= Billy Jay Stein =

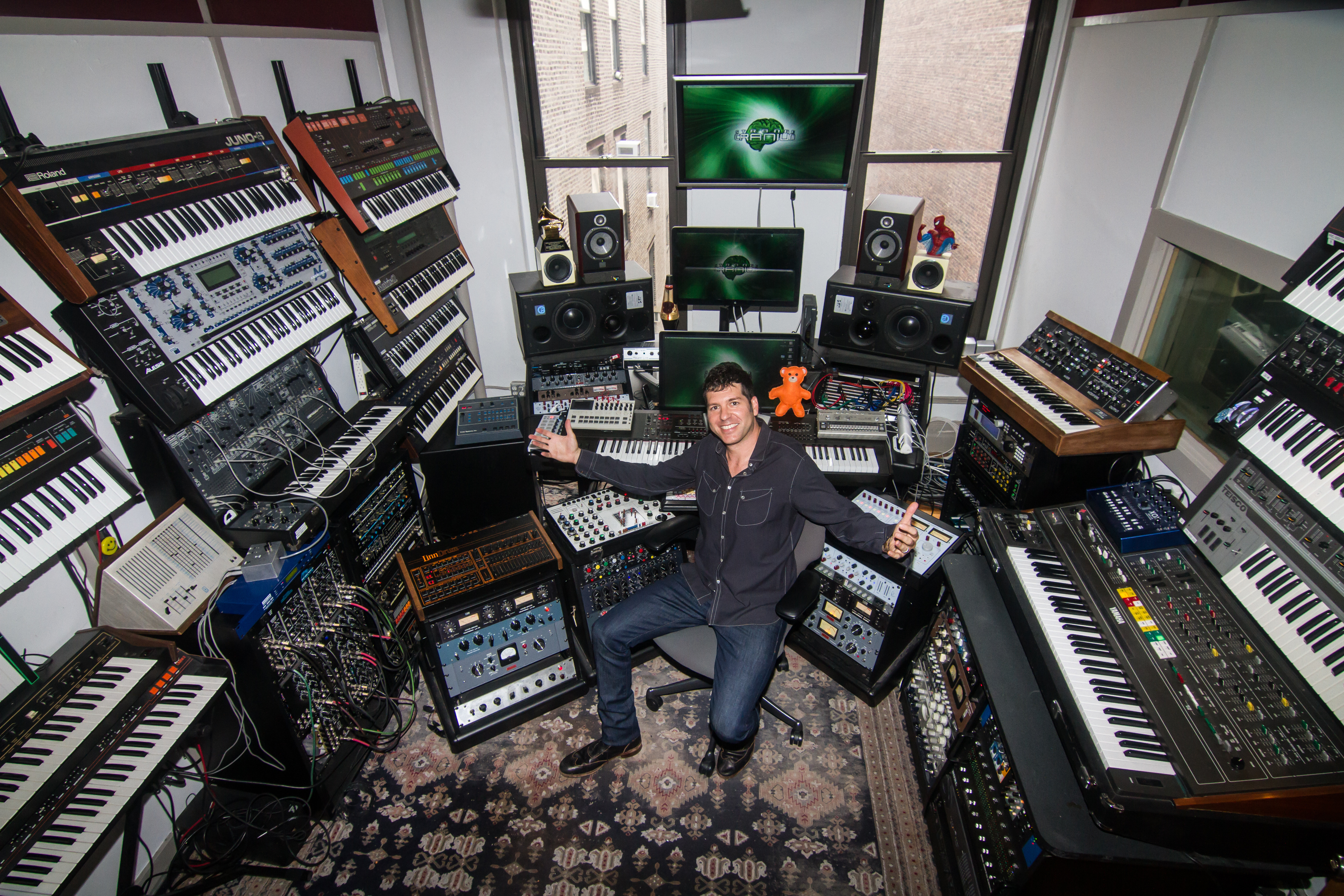
- Stein in his studio
- Born: February 2, 1970 (age 56); Bronx, New York
- Occupations: Composer, music producer, musician
- Spouse: Laura M. Miles
- Musical career
- Years active: 1993–present
- Website: http://www.strangecranium.com

Billy Jay Stein (also known as William Stein, Billy Stein and Strange Cranium) is a pianist, keyboardist, composer, music director, record producer, electronic music designer, and mixing engineer. He won the 2015 Grammy Award for Best Musical Theatre Album for producing and mixing Beautiful: The Carole King Musical.

== Early life and education ==
Billy Jay Stein was born on February 5, 1970, in Bronx, NY. He began studying the piano at the age of six. After graduating from Jericho High School, Stein attended the University of Pennsylvania, where he graduated in 1991 with a Bachelor of Arts degree in the biological basis of behavior with an emphasis on neural systems, and minored in music.

== Career ==
Stein became a member of the rock and roll band, The MadHatters, in 1989. The band, which included members Adam Hirsh (vocals, guitar), Adam Evans (guitar, vocals), Billy Jay Stein (keyboards, vocals), Jon Kaplan (bass), and Tommy Kaelin (drums), officially changed their name to The Hatters in 1993;; same year Atlantic signed the band, and released Live Thunderchicken, taken from their club appearances. In 1994, they recorded their debut studio album, The Madcap Adventures of the Avocado Overlord, and their final album, You Will Be You was released in 1995, just prior to the band's break up.

In 1996 Stein returned to New York City, where he attended classes in orchestration and conducting at the Juilliard School and began working with former Hatter bandmate, Adam Hirsh, AKA Tree Adams. Together they composed the score to the film Definite Maybe.

In 1998, Stein founded Strange Cranium Productions, Inc., a full service music company. Heading up Strange Cranium Productions, Stein has composed music for television shows such as MTV's "Boiling Points", VH1's "The List", HBO's "Sex In The City", and Showtime's Nurse Jackie. Productions by Stein under Strange Cranium include "Handel’s Messiah Rocks", featuring the Keith Lockhart and Boston Pops Orchestra, and The Other Side Of Me, by Linda Eder.

Stein has played on recordings with artists such as Linda Eder, Kate Voegele, Sons of Sylvia, Kevin Hammond, Laura Izibor, Joe Budden, East Village Opera Company, Cartel, Darlene Love, Jet Lag Gemini, The Damnwells, Henri Salvador, Bernard Lavilliers, Born Cages, The Bacon Brothers, IVO, and Ray Charles.

In 2014 Stein composed the score for the feature film, Sister, which was an Official Selection at the 2014 Tribeca Film Festival.

Stein began touring with Linda Eder in 2000 as a keyboard player and become her musical director and pianist in 2008. Stein has also been involved in multiple Broadway productions as keyboard player and Assistant Conductor. From 1997 - 2001 Stein played keyboards in Jekyll & Hyde. From 2011 to 2014, Stein was the Electronic Music Designer, keyboard 1, and assistant conductor for Spider-Man: Turn Off the Dark.

Other credits for Electronic Music Designer include Fun Home (Original Broadway – current), Flashdance (National Tour 2012–current), Jekyll & Hyde (Original Broadway 2013), Beautiful: The Carole King Musical (Original Broadway 2014–current, London – current), Cinderella (National tour – current), Chess (1998), Fortress Of Solitude (Public Theatre, Dallas Theatre Center – 2014), Linda Eder: The Holiday Concert (Palace Theatre – 2004), Linda Eder at the Gershwin (Gershwin Theatre – 2001), Chess (John Houseman Theatre – 1998), Tuck Everlasting Atlanta Alliance Theatre – 2015).

In 2008 Stein founded Strike Audio, a music licensing company, with Michael Rosen. Strike Audio is a leading provider of exclusive, world-class music for television. Strike Audio, with 15 award-winning composer writings and producing full-time, airs music 24 hours a day and seven days a week, around the world. Strike Audio cues have been featured on more than 350 television series and specials, including Pawn Stars, Duck Dynasty, Long Island Medium, and Wahlburgers.

In 2015, Stein won a Grammy for Best Musical Theatre Album. He produced and mixed Beautiful: The Carole King Musical with co-producers Steve Sidwell and Jason Howland.

In 2016, Stein was the Composer, Music Producer, and Arranger for The New York Spectacular Starring the Radio City Rockettes at Radio City Music Hall. The production featured unique arrangements of hit music and legendary compositions by artists including John Lennon, Paul McCartney, Taylor Swift, Shawn Carter, Alicia Keys, Madonna, Sting, and Frank Sinatra.

From 2018 to 2020, Stein was the electronic music producer and designer for Tina Fey's Mean Girls, which ran on Broadway from 2018 to 2020. In 2020 Stein was the music producer and mixer for the original virtual musical, A Killer Party (www.akillerpartymusical.com). The musical was created by over 55 Broadway professionals during the COVID-19 Pandemic, providing some financial help/relief to everyone involved.

In 2020, Stein also co-produced and mixed the Carole King classic, “You've got A Friend”. A video that has been viewed, nearly 1 Million times, and generated thousands of dollars in support of the Actor's Fund. The music video is a collaboration between artists from four continents; all of whom had performed/played the show “Beautiful”, including in London, Tokyo, Sydney, Toronto, New York, and all over the US.

In 2020, He also engineered and mixed the music for the event Night of Covenant House Stars.The event featured Dolly Parton, Jon Bon Jovi and Meryl Streep and raised over $1 Million dollars for Covenant house.

In 2020, one of Strike Audio's master tracks (Mystery by Bernd Schoenhart) was sampled on the 21 Savage & Metro Boomin's SAVAGE MODE II, which debuted at No.1 on the Billboard 200 Chart on October 11, 2020.

Stein is the head of the team that created and maintains Strange Cranium's MainBrain Show Control Software. The proprietary software allows a music conductor to easily control, adapt, and rearrange prerecorded audios. The system is used nightly to control audio playback in many Broadway and touring shows.

Billy Jay Stein has one of the largest collections of vintage and modern synthesizers in the world. He has also been featured in Keyboard and Electronic Musician Magazines.

== Personal life ==
Stein is married to Laura Miles. They have two children and live in Manhattan.

== Discography ==
Year	Album/Artist/Credit
2020	Savage Mode II (21 Savage & Metro Boomin) Publisher
2020	A Killer Party (Original Cast Recording) Music Producer, Mixer
2019	Tootsie (Original Broadway Cast Recording) Electronic Music Design, Keyboards
2018	Mean Girls (Original Broadway Cast Recording) Electronic Music Design, Keyboards
2017	Amélie, A New Musical (Original Broadway Cast Recording) Electronic Music Design, Keyboards
2017	The Band's Visit (Original Broadway Cast Recording) Electronic Music Design, Keyboards
2016	Tuck Everlasting (Original Broadway Cast Recording) Keyboard Programming
2015	Fun Home (Broadway Cast Recording) Keyboard Programming
2015	The Fortress of Solitude (The Fortress of Solitude Cast Ensemble) Synthesizer Programming
2014	Beautiful: The Carole King Musical [Original Broadway Cast Recording] Editing, Mixing, Producer
2014	Fun Home Keyboard Programming
2012	Jekyll & Hyde: 2012 Concept Recording Engineer, Keyboards, Mixing, Producer, Synthesizer Programming
2012	Steadfast Clay Aiken Vocal Engineer
2011	Gravity Happens Kate Voegele Keyboards, Programming
2011	Now Linda Eder Arranger, Engineer, Featured Artist, Mixing, Producer
2011	Spider-Man: Turn Off the Dark Electronic Design, Keyboards, Synthesizer Programming
2010	Revelation Suns of Sylvia Hammond B3, Piano, Wurlitzer
2010	Tried & True Clay Aiken Engineer, Vocal Engineer
2009	Handel's Messiah Rocks Joyful Noise Arranger, Engineer, Mixing, Producer
2009	Let the Truth Be Told Laura Izibor Engineer, Hammond B3, Wurlitzer
2009	Soundtrack Linda Eder Engineer, Keyboards, Musical Direction, Piano
2008	Fire the Cannons Jet Lag Gemini Keyboards, Programming
2008	Olde School The East Village Opera Company Engineer, Programming, Pro-Tools
2008	The Other Side of Me Linda Eder Arranger, Audio Production, Bass Engineer, Composer, Digital Editing, Drum Programming, Guitar Engineer, Keyboard Engineer, Main Personnel, Organ (Hammond), Piano, Producer, Synthesizer, Synthesizer Bass, Vocal Engineer
2007	Cartel Cartel Keyboards, Member of Attributed Artist
2007	It's Christmas, of Course Darlene Love Fender Rhodes, Hammond B3, Main Personnel, Piano, Synthesizer, Wurlitzer
2007	Throwing Rocks at the Sun The Mercury Seed Hammond B3, Keyboards, Piano
2006	Air Stereo The Damnwells Keyboards, Organ (Hammond), Piano, String Arrangements, Wurlitzer
2006	One Life, Many Voices: For Hurricane Relief Arranger, Keyboards, Producer
2006	Révérence Henri Salvador Organ (Hammond)
2006	The Great American Trailer Park Musical [Original Cast Recording] Audio Production, Mixing, Producer
2005	Altar Boyz Producer
2005	The East Village Opera Company The East Village Opera Company Keyboard Programming
2004	Carnets De Bord Bernard Lavilliers Organ (Hammond)
2004	Will & Grace: Let the Music Out! Keyboards
2003	Becstasy Becky Baeling Composer, Songwriter
2003	Broadway My Way Linda Eder Keyboards
2003	Don't Pick It Up Mrs. Grundy Organ, Soloist
2003	Joe Budden Joe Budden Keyboards, String Arrangements, String Writing, Strings
2002	Dust The Mercury Seed Keyboards, Musician, Piano
2002	Gold Linda Eder Keyboards
2001	Another Day Gone Ben Rogers Organ, Wurlitzer
1995	Wiggly, Vol. 2: Bootlegged Keyboards, Vocals
1995	You Will Be You The Hatters Piano, Vocals
1994	The Madcap Adventures of the Avocado Overload The Hatters Bass, Composer, Keyboards, Vocals
1993	Live Thunderchicken The Hatters Composer, Keyboards, Vocals A Lovely Way to Spend an Evening Marcus Goldhaber Arranger, Hammond B3, Producer, Wurlitzer The Breithaupt Brothers Songbook, Vol. 2: Just Passing Through Engineer Urban Beatz, Vol. 2 Billy Jay Stein Primary Artist Urban Beatz, Vol. 3 Billy Jay Stein Primary Artist
