= Wrap Me Up (Jimmy Fallon and Meghan Trainor song) =

2023 single by Jimmy Fallon and Meghan Trainor

Single by Jimmy Fallon and Meghan Trainor

from the album Holiday Seasoning
- Released: November 17, 2023
- Genre: Doo-wop; hip hop; Christmas
- Length: 2:28
- Label: Republic
- Songwriters: Jimmy Fallon; Meghan Trainor; Sean Douglas; Gian Stone
- Producer: Gian Stone

Jimmy Fallon singles chronology
"Almost Too Early for Christmas" (2022)	"Wrap Me Up" (2023)	"Holiday" (2024)

Meghan Trainor singles chronology
"Hands on Me" (2023)	"Wrap Me Up" (2023)	"Been Like This" (2024)

Music video
- "Wrap Me Up" on YouTube

"Wrap Me Up" is a song by American comedian Jimmy Fallon and singer-songwriter Meghan Trainor, included on the former's third studio album, Holiday Seasoning (2024). Fallon and Trainor wrote it with songwriter Sean Douglas and its producer, Gian Stone. Republic Records released it as a single on November 17, 2023. A doo-wop, hip hop, and Christmas song, "Wrap Me Up" is written as a duet on which two narrators exchange flirtatious lyrics in a call-and-response format. One of them expresses curiosity about their Christmas gift and the other one withholds the answer before offering themselves as the gift.

Music critics were positive about "Wrap Me Up" and directed praise towards its production, which they found catchy. The song peaked at number 92 on the Canadian Hot 100 chart and number four on the Bubbling Under Hot 100. It also reached number two on the Adult Contemporary chart and number five on Digital Song Sales. The accompanying music video was premiered on The Tonight Show Starring Jimmy Fallon, and Fallon and Trainor performed "Wrap Me Up" on Jimmy Kimmel Live! as well as at the Jingle Ball.

== Background ==
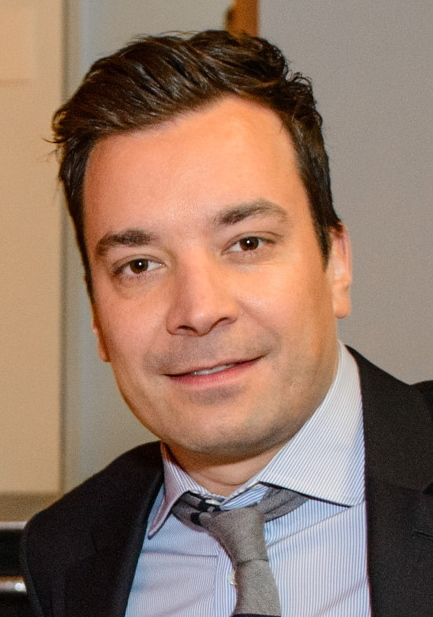
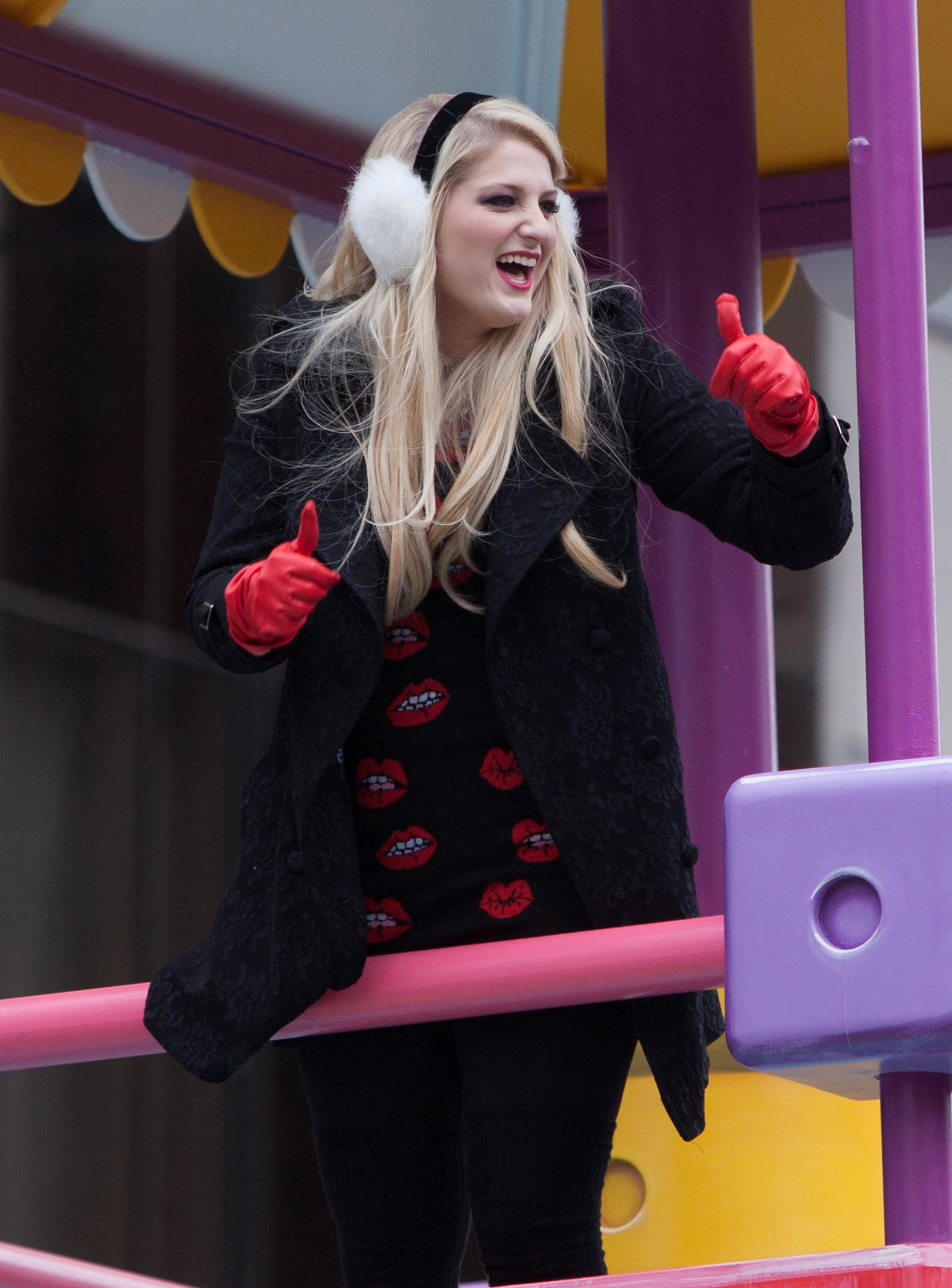
"Wrap Me Up" is a Christmas duet between Jimmy Fallon and Meghan Trainor.

Jimmy Fallon had frequently performed Christmas songs on The Tonight Show Starring Jimmy Fallon. He also officially released the holiday song "It Was a... (Masked Christmas)", featuring Ariana Grande and Megan Thee Stallion, in 2021, and "Almost Too Early for Christmas" with Dolly Parton the following year. Meghan Trainor released the album A Very Trainor Christmas in 2020 and began collaborating with songwriter Sean Douglas and producer Gian Stone on the album Takin' It Back the following year. In March 2023, Fallon announced that he expected a Christmas album he had been working on for several years to be released later in the year; it contained comedy and traditional songs along with some duets.

Considering her a great performer and songwriter and admiring how she handled a 2016 incident where she fell while performing her song "Me Too" on his show, Fallon had "always wanted to do something" with Trainor. He sent her a recording of an idea called "Wrap It Up", which was about wrapping presents, but did not immediately receive a response. Trainor eventually agreed to the collaboration but changed its lyrics, renaming it to "Wrap Me Up" because she thought Fallon's concept "sound[ed] like condoms". Fallon, Trainor, Douglas, and Stone completed the song over a FaceTime call, during which Trainor described being "so nervous [her] heart was in [her] ass".

Fallon said that he really liked the holidays while announcing "Wrap Me Up". Playing a snippet of the song on his show, he stated: "This song is a bop. The song is a banger. This song eats. This song slaps." Republic Records released it as a single on November 17, 2023, and sent it to contemporary hit radio stations in the United States three days later. The music video, in which Fallon and Trainor sing in red-and-green outfits, aired on Fallon's show on December 13, 2023. In November 2024, "Wrap Me Up" was included on the former's third studio album, Holiday Seasoning.

== Composition ==
"Wrap Me Up" is two minutes and twenty-eight seconds long. Stone produced the song; Stone and Trainor handled vocal production, and they also served as the recording engineers alongside John Arbuckle and Mike Wozniak. Ben Rice played the guitar, and Kurt Thum performed the programming. Stone, Fallon, Trainor and her brother Justin provided the background vocals. The song's mixing was done by Serban Ghenea, with assistance from Bryce Bordone, and Randy Merrill handled mastering.

Billboard's Lars Brandle described "Wrap Me Up" as "a throwback doo-wop-meets-hip-hop Crimbo number", and People's Jack Irvin called it a Christmas duet. The song's flirtatious lyrics are written as a call-and-response duet, with Fallon voicing the narrator who is curious about his Christmas gift and Trainor the one who playfully withholds the answer and later presents herself as the gift. In the lyrics, Fallon asks Trainor what present she is giving him for Christmas, speculating that it could be a number of things like a drone, a razor, a Maserati, or a Bugatti. Trainor replies that the present is her: "Is it Boujee? / Like Gucci? / Man, I thought I had it / No, baby, you're lookin' at it." In the song's chorus, they sing together about wanting someone to wrap their arms around them during Christmastime and describe themselves as "the whole damn package".

== Reception ==
Critical reception for "Wrap Me Up" was positive, with praise directed towards its production. iHeartRadio's Rebekah Gonzalez thought that like everything associated with Trainor—it was incredibly catchy. Sydni Ellis of SheKnows described "Wrap Me Up" as a "banger", and Jackie Manno of NBC wrote that it completely met the expectations of it being a Christmas hit. Writing for American Songwriter, Matthew Wilson believed the song was alluring, thrifty, and, above all, it was catchy, and he described the chorus as charmingly playful.

In the United States, "Wrap Me Up" peaked at number four on the Bubbling Under Hot 100 chart issued for December 30, 2023. The song reached high positions on other charts in the country, peaking at number two on the Adult Contemporary airplay chart and number five on Digital Song Sales. Additionally, it peaked at number 33 on Adult Pop Airplay, number 38 on Pop Airplay, and number 100 on the Holiday 100. "Wrap Me Up" debuted at number 92 on the Canadian Hot 100 issued for January 6, 2024.

== Live performances ==
Fallon and Trainor performed "Wrap Me Up" live for the first time at Jimmy Kimmel Live! on November 27, 2023. Trainor dressed up as a red-colored Christmas tree, with her dress bearing pictures of her husband and sons, and Fallon was clad in a red velvet tuxedo, accompanied by four festively-dressed backup dancers and vocalists. It was followed by Fallon going onto a street and distributing presents to passers-by, which he uploaded as a social media post while stating his excitement about the song and for people to hear it. Trainor also performed the song with Fallon as part of her set list for the Jingle Ball in 2024.

== Credits and personnel ==
Credits are adapted from Qobuz.

- Gian Stone – producer, songwriter, vocal producer, recording engineer, programming, background vocals
- Jimmy Fallon – songwriter, background vocals
- Meghan Trainor – songwriter, vocal producer, recording engineer
- Sean Douglas – songwriter
- Ben Rice – guitar
- Justin Trainor – background vocals
- John Arbuckle – recording engineer
- Mike Wozniak – recording engineer
- Kurt Thum – programming
- Randy Merrill – mastering
- Serban Ghenea – mixing
- Bryce Bordone – mixing assistance

== Charts ==
=== Weekly charts ===
Weekly chart performance for "Wrap Me Up"
Chart (2023–2024)	Peak position
Canada Hot 100 (Billboard)	92
Canada Hot AC (Billboard)	39
US Bubbling Under Hot 100 (Billboard)	4
US Adult Contemporary (Billboard)	2
US Adult Pop Airplay (Billboard)	33
US Digital Song Sales (Billboard)	5
US Holiday 100 (Billboard)	100
US Pop Airplay (Billboard)	38

=== Year-end charts ===
2024 year-end chart performance for "Wrap Me Up"
Chart (2024)	Position
US Adult Contemporary (Billboard)	42

== Release history ==
Release date and formats for "Wrap Me Up"
Region	Date	Format(s)	Label	Ref.
Various	November 17, 2023	Digital download; streaming	Republic	
United States	November 20, 2023	Contemporary hit radio	Republic	
