= Graceless =

Graceless may refer to:

- Graceless (Sulk album)
- Graceless, English marketing name of 2003 Shino Lin album Bùzhī hǎodǎi
- "Graceless", 2013 song by The National (band) from the album Trouble Will Find Me
- "Graceless", song by The Damnwells from Air Stereo 2006
- "Graceless", song by The Crayon Fields
- Graceless (Big Finish series), an audio play series by Big Finish Productions
- Graceless, the original name of the protagonist Christian in The Pilgrim's Progress.
