= Holiday Seasoning =

2024 Jimmy Fallon Christmas album

Studio album by Jimmy Fallon
- Released: November 1, 2024
- Recorded: 2021–2024
- Studio: Cove City Sound Studios (Glen Cove, NY); Electric Lady Studios (New York, NY); Hourglass Studios (Wilmington, NC); Ido's Home Studio (Los Angeles, CA); Meghan Trainor's home, CA; Republic Studios (New York, NY); Strange Cranium (New York, NY); Strike Audio; Sunset Sound (Los Angeles, CA)
- Genre: Pop
- Length: 38:51
- Label: St. James Place; Republic
- Producer: Jimmy Fallon; Ido Zmishlany; Gian Stone; Jon Bellion; Tenroc; Pete Nappi; "Weird Al" Yankovic; the Roots; Billy Jay Stein

Jimmy Fallon chronology
Blow Your Pants Off (2012)	Holiday Seasoning (2024)

Singles from Holiday Seasoning
- 1. "It Was a... (Masked Christmas)" Released: December 7, 2021; 2. "Almost Too Early for Christmas" Released: November 4, 2022; 3. "Wrap Me Up" Released: November 17, 2023; 4. "Holiday" Released: November 1, 2024

Holiday Seasoning is the third studio album by American entertainer Jimmy Fallon, released through St. James Place and Republic Records on November 1, 2024. The holiday album contains guest appearances from the Jonas Brothers, the Roots, Meghan Trainor, Justin Timberlake, Ariana Grande, Megan Thee Stallion, "Weird Al" Yankovic, Will Ferrell, Chelsea Handler, Cara Delevingne, and Dolly Parton, as well as Lang Lang and LL Cool J on the deluxe edition. Fallon, the Roots, and Yankovic were also responsible for production, alongside Ido Zmishlany, Gian Stone, Jon Bellion, Tenroc, Pete Nappi, and Billy Jay Stein. Jimmy Fallon's Holiday Seasoning Spectacular, an accompanying holiday special, aired in December 2024 featuring a number of guests from the album.

== Production and composition ==
Production on an album of Christmas music started in 2021, after a suggestion from Michele Anthony of Universal Music Group prompted Fallon to record a holiday song. He recorded a cover but was dissatisfied with it, and felt that established singers would be able to sing them better; instead, he opted to write his own original Christmas songs. "Chipmunks & Chestnuts", which draws influences from Roy Orbison, Slim Whitman, and Monty Python, was the first song written for the project. In December 2021, "It Was a... (Masked Christmas)" with Ariana Grande and Megan Thee Stallion was the first single released from the album. The song started out as an idea in August 2021 when Fallon was recording at Electric Lady Studios; his intention behind the track was to cheer people up during the COVID-19 pandemic. At the time, he approached Grande to sing the hook but did not hear back until October; she then got in touch with Megan Thee Stallion to record the rap.

"Almost Too Early for Christmas" with Dolly Parton was released in November 2022, accompanied by a lyric video featuring cartoon versions of the two performers; the song refers to the phenomenon of the Christmas creep. The two, who had previously collaborated on a cover of Mariah Carey's "All I Want for Christmas Is You" for Parton's A Holly Dolly Christmas (2020), performed the song on the holiday special, Dolly Parton's Mountain Magic Christmas, which aired on December 1, 2022. "Almost Too Early for Christmas" has a psychedelic introduction and was originally intended for a Harry Styles collaboration. "Wrap Me Up" with Meghan Trainor was released in November 2023; the two promoted the single with a performance on Jimmy Kimmel Live! and a music video released the following month. In September 2024, Justin Timberlake teased his duet with Fallon, "You'll Be There", on an appearance on The Tonight Show Starring Jimmy Fallon; Timberlake was responsible for much of the instrumentation on the track. Fallon revealed that Timberlake's touring commitments was the reason he was the most difficult guest to have on the album.

The tracks on Holiday Seasoning span a number of genres and musical influences. "Holiday" with the Jonas Brothers, originally titled "Silent Night", was envisioned as a song in the vein of the Jacksons' "Blame It on the Boogie", with some added influence of Chic to make it sound like a roller disco song. "New Year's Eve Polka (5-4-3-2-1)", a polka song with "Weird Al" Yankovic and the Roots, was conceived after Fallon lamented the lack of cheerful songs for New Year's Eve. "Coquito", an "off-beat reggaeton" track, was written as a tribute to the namesake Puerto Rican alcoholic Christmas cocktail. The folky "One Glove" with Will Ferrell was inspired by Warren Zevon, "Weird Cousin" is a lo-fi jam in the style of Weezer, while Fallon wanted "Thanksgiving Eve" to sound like a Bob Dylan song. "Hallmark Movie" with Cara Delevingne is a song that starts out like a romantic movie similar to those aired on the Hallmark Channel, but then turns into a dramatic Lifetime movie.

Fallon recorded covers of "Silent Night" and "The Little Drummer Boy" at Electric Lady during a blizzard in 2023; they are included on the track listing for the album's deluxe edition. The deluxe edition features Christmas songs that are not necessarily comedic in nature, including a cover of Harry Nilsson's "Remember (Christmas)" with pianist Lang Lang. Fallon estimates that around 25 original songs were written for the album.

== Promotion and release ==
The album was announced on October 10, 2024, and released on CD, vinyl, and digital formats on November 1, 2024. In March 2023, Fallon had told E! News that the plans were for his album to be released that year. Merchandise accompanied the release of the album, including a Christmas sweater, a Christmas stocking, and oven mitts. In addition, a gift box of holiday seasonings was launched, which includes a hot chocolate blend created in collaboration with Fallon and his two daughters. A limited-time channel, Holiday Seasoning Radio, was launched on SiriusXM featuring holiday songs selected by Fallon as well as a behind-the-scenes look into the making of the album. In December 2024, Crumbl launched a candy cane chocolate brownie inspired by Holiday Seasoning, developed in collaboration with Fallon.

On October 29, 2024, Fallon appeared on The Howard Stern Show to discuss the album; he also performed "Chipmunks & Chestnuts" on air. Following the album's release, individual lyric videos were released for track, as well as a yule log video featuring the entire album, in which Fallon makes various cameos. Fallon additionally appeared on a number of talk shows to promote the album, including Watch What Happens Live with Andy Cohen, where he revealed plans for the deluxe edition, Hot Ones, Elvis Duran and the Morning Show, and Today.

"Holiday" was serviced to American radio stations as the fourth and final single from the album, becoming Fallon's first song to top the country's Adult Contemporary chart. Its music video features the Jonas Brothers trapped in a snow globe, and the song's remix features rapper LL Cool J. "Holiday" was released as a single in Italy on December 13, 2024. Fallon and the Roots performed "Hey Rudy" at the 2024 Macy's Thanksgiving Day Parade on November 28, and again for 2024's last episode of The Tonight Show Starring Jimmy Fallon, accompanied by the Radio City Rockettes. Jimmy Fallon's Holiday Seasoning Spectacular, an accompanying holiday special, aired on December 4, 2024, on NBC, featuring a number of guests from the album. The deluxe edition of Holiday Seasoning was released on December 6, 2024, featuring nine additional tracks.

Holiday Seasoning (Sweater Deluxe) released on November 28, 2025, under exclusive license to Republic Records, is the reissue of Jimmy Fallon's 2024 album, expanding the original 17 tracks release with nine songs for a total of 26 tracks.

== Reception ==
Professional ratings
Review scores
Source	Rating
AllMusic	3/5 stars
The Times	1/5 stars

In a three-star review, Marcy Donelson of AllMusic praised the affectionate "Holiday" and "Almost Too Early for Christmas", but doubted some of the songs would fit in with other holiday music, noting they could be used as background music. Maria Sherman of the Associated Press and Gary Graff of Cleveland.com included Holiday Seasoning on their lists of 2024's best holiday albums. In addition, "Holiday" was included on Billboard's list of best new Christmas songs of 2024. On the other hand, Will Hodgkinson of The Times called Holiday Seasoning "one of the most annoying Christmas albums in history", and said Fallon's vocals sounded like they were AI-generated.

In the U.S., Holiday Seasoning debuted atop Billboard's Comedy Albums chart and at number 2 on the Top Holiday Albums chart, with almost 13,000 album-equivalent units in its first week, according to Luminate, becoming Fallon's second number-one on the former. In addition, the album debuted at number 3 on the Top Album Sales chart and number 9 on the Vinyl Albums chart, with nearly 12,000 copies sold. The album has spent four weeks atop the Comedy Albums chart.

== Track listing ==
Holiday Seasoning track listing
No.	Title	Writer(s)	Producer(s)	Length
1.	"Christmas Ding Dong"	Jimmy Fallon; Gerard Bradford; Mike DiCenzo	Fallon; John Rooney^{[a]}	1:16
2.	"Holiday" (with Jonas Brothers)	Fallon; Ido Zmishlany; Marcus Lomax	Ido Zmishlany	3:03
3.	"Hey Rudy" (with the Roots)	Fallon; Gian Stone; Sean Douglas; Jonathan David Bellion; Jason Cornet; Pete Nappi; Tariq Trotter	Gian Stone; Jon Bellion; Tenroc; Pete Nappi^{[p]}; Zmishlany^{[v]}	2:40
4.	"Wrap Me Up" (with Meghan Trainor)	Fallon; Stone; Douglas; Meghan Trainor	Stone^{[p]}; Meghan Trainor^{[v]}	2:28
5.	"You'll Be There" (with Justin Timberlake)	Fallon; Zmishlany; Ryan Tedder; Gregory Hein	Zmishlany	3:21
6.	"It Was a... (Masked Christmas)" (featuring Ariana Grande and Megan Thee Stallion)	Fallon; Zmishlany; Hein; Rami Yacoub; Myles William	Zmishlany	3:00
7.	"How You Know It's Christmastime"	Fallon; Zmishlany; Nick Long	Zmishlany; Nick Long^{[a]}	2:15
8.	"New Year's Eve Polka (5-4-3-2-1)" (with "Weird Al" Yankovic and the Roots)	Fallon; Bradford; DiCenzo; Al Yankovic	Zmishlany; "Weird Al" Yankovic; the Roots	1:42
9.	"Chipmunks & Chestnuts"	Fallon; Bradford; DiCenzo	Billy Jay Stein; Fallon	2:30
10.	"One Glove" (with Will Ferrell)	Fallon; Will Ferrell; DiCenzo	Fallon; Rooney^{[c]}; Zmishlany^{[a]}^{[v]}	2:35
11.	"Merry Happy Christmas" (with Chelsea Handler)	Fallon; Bradford; DiCenzo	Fallon; Rooney^{[c]}; Jon Kaplan^{[a]}	2:32
12.	"Coquito"	Fallon; Dean Chamberlain	Fallon; Rooney^{[c]}	1:17
13.	"Hallmark Movie" (with Cara Delevingne)	Fallon; Sage Boggs; DiCenzo	Fallon; Zmishlany^{[c]}^{[v]}	1:42
14.	"Weird Cousin"	Fallon; Boggs	Fallon; Rooney^{[c]}	2:09
15.	"Thanksgiving Eve"	Fallon; Bradford; DiCenzo	Fallon; Rooney^{[c]}; Kaplan^{[c]}	3:13
16.	"Almost Too Early for Christmas" (with Dolly Parton)	Fallon; Zmishlany; Sarah Solovay; Victoria Zaro	Zmishlany	3:03

Deluxe tracks
No.	Title	Writer(s)	Producer(s)	Length
17.	"Christmas Alone"	Fallon; Stone; Cornet; Bellion; Nappi; Douglas	Stone; Bellion; Tenroc; Nappi^{[p]}; Zmishlany^{[v]}	2:26
18.	"The Elves Are Unionizing"	Fallon; Bradford; DiCenzo	Fallon; Rooney^{[c]}; Kaplan^{[c]}	2:17
19.	"Broadway (Do You Remember)"	Fallon; Bradford; DiCenzo	Fallon; Zmishlany^{[c]}; Kaplan^{[c]}	2:15
20.	"Today at Christmastime"	Fallon; John Haskell; Jonathan Adler; Boggs	Fallon; Rooney^{[c]}	2:08
21.	"Remember (Christmas)" (with Lang Lang)	Harry Nilsson	Stone; Kurt Thum	3:28
22.	"Elvis on the Shelvis" (The Tonight Show Starring Jimmy Fallon)	Fallon; Bradford	The Tonight Show Starring Jimmy Fallon	1:26
23.	"Little Drummer Boy" (at Electric Lady)	Harry Simeone; Henry Onorati; Katherine K. Davis	Fallon; Rooney; Zmishlany^{[a]}; Kaplan^{[a]}	2:00
24.	"Silent Night" (at Electric Lady)	John Freeman Young	Fallon; Rooney	2:20
25.	"Holiday" (with Jonas Brothers and LL Cool J)	Fallon; Zmishlany; JT Smith; Lomax	Zmishlany	3:03

Notes

- ^{^[p]} denotes a primary and vocal producer
- ^{^[c]} denotes a co-producer
- ^{^[a]} denotes an additional producer
- ^{^[v]} denotes a vocal producer

== Personnel ==
=== Musicians ===
- Jimmy Fallon – vocals (all tracks), background vocals (tracks 2, 3, 6, 25), whistle (7), glockenspiel (11, 18), acoustic guitar (11, 19, 23), piano (15, 19); clapping, harmonica, shaker, tambourine (15); guitar (18, 24), percussion (19, 23, 24), drums (23)
- Ido Zmishlany – guitar (2, 5, 6, 16, 25), bass (2, 5, 16, 25), drums (2, 6, 16, 25), background vocals (2, 6, 8, 25), programming (3, 6, 16); drum programming, ukulele (5); keyboards (6, 16, 19), string arrangement (7), percussion (16)
- Alex Foster – background vocals, saxophone (tracks 2, 25)
- MarcLo – background vocals (tracks 2, 25)
- Jonas Brothers
  - Nick Jonas – vocals (tracks 2, 25)
  - Joe Jonas – vocals (tracks 2, 25)
  - Kevin Jonas – guitar (tracks 2, 25)
- Mark Kelley – bass (tracks 3, 8, 22)
- Questlove – drums (tracks 3, 8, 22), percussion (22)
- Captain Kirk Douglas – guitar (tracks 3, 8, 22)
- James Poyser – keyboards (tracks 3, 8, 22)
- Kamal Gray – keyboards (tracks 3, 8, 22)
- Ray Angry – keyboards (tracks 3, 8, 22)
- Stro Elliot – percussion (tracks 3, 8, 22)
- Ian Hendrickson-Smith – saxophone (tracks 3, 8)
- Dave Guy – trumpet (tracks 3, 8)
- Gian Stone – programming (tracks 3, 17, 21); drums, keyboards (3, 17); background vocals, percussion (3)
- Pete Nappi – keyboards, programming (3, 17); background vocals, drums, percussion (3)
- TenRoc – bass, drums, keyboards, programming (tracks 3, 17); background vocals, guitar, percussion (3)
- Jon Bellion – background vocals (track 3), programming (17)
- Cherie Bugtong – background vocals (track 3)
- Imani Beau – background vocals (track 3)
- Liana Banks – background vocals (track 3)
- Sean Douglas – background vocals (track 3)
- Tariq Trotter – vocals (track 3)
- Meghan Trainor – vocals (track 4)
- Brian Kilgore – drums, percussion (track 5)
- Justin Timberlake – vocals (track 5)
- Aldae – background vocals (track 6)
- PJ Walshe – background vocals (track 6)
- Myles William – percussion (track 6)
- Ariana Grande – vocals (track 6)
- Megan Thee Stallion – vocals (track 6)
- Dave Eggar – cello, double bass, string arrangement, violin (track 7)
- Nick Long – guitar, whistle (track 7)
- Gabriel King – saxophone, trumpet (track 7)
- Sean Claire – viola, violin (track 7)
- Nadav Nirenberg – trombone (track 7)
- "Weird Al" Yankovic – accordion, vocals (track 8)
- Billy Jay Stein – piano, programming, strings, synth bass (track 9)
- Chris Jago – drums, percussion (track 9)
- Antoine Silverman – viola, violin (track 9)
- Jason Paige – background vocals (track 9)
- Zev Katz – bass (track 9)
- Bernd Schoenhart – guitar (track 9)
- Kevin Ramessar – guitar (track 9)
- Matt Beck – guitar (track 9)
- Jason Howland – programming (track 9)
- Trevor D. Neumann – trumpet (track 9)
- David Mann – woodwinds (track 9)
- Will Ferrell – vocals (track 10)
- Jon Kaplan – bass (tracks 11, 15, 18, 19), keyboards (11, 18, 23), drum programming (15, 18), horn (15), percussion (18), drums (19)
- Chelsea Handler – vocals (track 11)
- Cara Delevingne – vocals (track 13)
- Ray Goren – guitar (tracks 16, 25)
- Gray Hawken – background vocals (track 16)
- Henry Patterson – background vocals (track 16)
- Victoria Zaro – background vocals (track 16)
- Dolly Parton – vocals (track 16)
- Richie Cannata – saxophone (track 19)
- Lang Lang – keyboards, piano (track 21)
- Kurt Thum – programming (track 21)
- Gelin Hau Plasencia – strings (track 21)
- Victor Indrizzo – drums (track 25)
- LL Cool J – vocals (track 25)

=== Technical ===
- Idania Valencia – mastering (tracks 1–3, 5, 7–15, 17–25)
- Randy Merrill – mastering (tracks 4, 6, 16)
- Jon Kaplan – mixing (tracks 1, 11, 15, 18, 19, 23)
- Josh Gudwin – mixing (tracks 2, 5, 16, 25)
- Alex Ghenea – mixing (tracks 3, 13)
- Serban Ghenea – mixing (track 4)
- Mark "Spike" Stent – mixing (track 6)
- Ido Zmishlany – mixing (tracks 7, 8, 10), engineering (3, 5, 7, 21)
- Billy Jay Stein – mixing, engineering (track 9)
- John Rooney – mixing (tracks 12, 14, 20, 24), engineering (tracks 1, 2, 5, 6, 10, 12–20, 23–25)
- Michael Freeman – mixing (tracks 17, 21)
- Lawrence Manchester – mixing, engineering (track 22)
- Jesse String – engineering (tracks 2, 25)
- Gian Stone – engineering (tracks 3, 4, 17, 21)
- John Arbuckle – engineering (tracks 3, 4, 17, 21)
- Pete Nappi – engineering (tracks 3, 17, 21)
- Meghan Trainor – engineering (track 4)
- Mike Wozniak – engineering (track 4)
- Christopher Godbey – engineering (track 5)
- Brendan Keenan – engineering (track 8)
- Trent Harrison – engineering (track 8)
- Carl Bespolka – engineering (track 16)
- TenRoc – engineering (track 17)
- Mike Dean – vocal mixing (track 6)
- Kal Pippal – mixing assistance (track 1), vocal editing (18)
- Felix Byrne – mixing assistance (tracks 2, 5, 25)
- Bryce Bordone – mixing assistance (track 4)

== Charts ==
Chart performance for Holiday Seasoning
Chart (2024)	Peak position
US Billboard 200	84
US Top Comedy Albums (Billboard)	1
US Top Holiday Albums (Billboard)	2
