= Holiday (Jimmy Fallon and Jonas Brothers song) =

2024 single by Jimmy Fallon and Jonas Brothers

Single by Jimmy Fallon and Jonas Brothers

from the album Holiday Seasoning
- Released: November 1, 2024
- Label: St. James Place; Republic
- Songwriters: Jimmy Fallon; Ido Zmishlany; Marcus Lomax
- Producer: Ido Zmishlany

Jimmy Fallon singles chronology
"Wrap Me Up" (2023)	"Holiday" (2024)

Jonas Brothers singles chronology
"Strong Enough" (2023)	"Holiday" (2024)	"Slow Motion" (2025)

Lyric video
- "Holiday" on YouTube

"Holiday" is a song by the American comedian Jimmy Fallon and the American pop rock group Jonas Brothers. It was released through St. James Place and Republic Records as a single from the former's third album studio album, Holiday Seasoning, on November 1, 2024. The song was written by Fallon himself, along with Ido Zmishlany and Marcus Lomax and produced by Zmishlany.

== Release and promotion ==
"Holiday" was released as the fourth and final single from the album Holiday Seasoning, on November 1, 2024. The song was serviced to American radio stations on the same day.

A remix, featuring rapper LL Cool J was released alongside the deluxe version of the song's parent album. "Holiday" became Fallon's first song to top the country's Adult Contemporary chart. On December 13, 2024, the song was released as a single in Italy.

== Music video ==
Its music video features the Jonas Brothers trapped in a snow globe, as part of Jimmy Fallon's Holiday Seasoning Spectacular, an accompanying holiday special, aired on December 4, 2024, on NBC.

== Charts ==
=== Weekly charts ===
Weekly chart performance
Chart (2024)	Peak position
US Adult Contemporary (Billboard)	1

=== Year-end charts ===
Year-end chart performance
Chart (2025)	Position
US Adult Contemporary (Billboard)	28
