= Golden Days =

Golden Days may refer to:

== Geography ==
- Golden Days, Alberta, a summer village in Canada

== Stage ==
- Golden Days (play), a 1919 comedy by Sidney Toler and Marion Short

== Publications ==
- Golden Days (novel), a 1986 novel by author Carolyn See
- Golden Days for Boys and Girls, a children's paper published from 1880 to 1907
- The Golden Days, a 1972 historical novel by author Robert Neill

== Music ==
- "Golden Days" (song), a 1984 single by the pop group Bucks Fizz
- Golden Days (Dave Barnes album), 2014 album by Dave Barnes
- Golden Days (Brian May and Kerry Ellis album), 2017 album by Brian May and Kerry Ellis
- Golden Days Radio, a community radio station based in Melbourne, Australia
- "Golden Days", song from The Student Prince by Sigmund Romberg
- "Golden Days", 1968 song by Sally Field
- "Golden Days", 1973 song by Tom Jones
- "Golden Days", 1974 song by Jack Bruce from Out of the Storm (album)
- "Golden Days", 2005 song by Drake Bell from Telegraph
- "Golden Days", 2006 song by The Damwells on Air Stereo
- "Golden Days", 2016 song by Panic! At The Disco from Death of a Bachelor
