= Ew! =

2014 single by Jimmy Fallon featuring will.i.am

Single by Jimmy Fallon featuring will.i.am
- Released: October 7, 2014
- Recorded: 2014
- Genre: Comedy pop; novelty
- Length: 2:15
- Label: Interscope
- Songwriters: Jimmy Fallon; William Adams
- Producer: William Adams

Jimmy Fallon singles chronology
"Drunk On Christmas" (2009)	"Ew!" (2014)	"It Was a... (Masked Christmas)" (2021)

will.i.am singles chronology
"Home" (2014)	"EW!" (2014)	"I'm So Excited" (2014)

"Ew!" is a song by American television host and comedian Jimmy Fallon, featuring American rapper will.i.am. The song is based on a sketch from The Tonight Show Starring Jimmy Fallon, in which Fallon and guests play teenage girls constantly disgusted by things around them.

The song debuted on The Tonight Show on October 6, 2014, with Fallon urging viewers to get the song to chart on the Billboard charts. It debuted on the Billboard Hot 100 one week later at number 26.

== Background ==
"EW!" focuses on two teenage girls, Sara (Fallon) and mir.i.am (will.i.am), and lists the things that disgust them.

The song's origins lie in will.i.am's appearance as a guest on The Tonight Show on July 29, 2014. He mentioned to Fallon backstage that he enjoyed the "Ew!" sketch, and Fallon replied that he would involve him in one upon his next visit. Three days later, Will sent Fallon a fully completed instrumental track for the song, after which Fallon and his writers wrote the song's lyrics. Following this, will.i.am flew to New York and the duo went to an unspecified local recording studio, where they further developed the song's lyrics and recorded it.

The song and music video premiered on the October 6, 2014 episode of The Tonight Show, with Fallon urging viewers and fans to push the song to chart on the Billboard Hot 100.

== Commercial performance ==
The song made its debut on radio on the Elvis Duran and the Morning Show on October 7, 2014. Proceeds from the single benefit the SeriousFun Children's Network and will.i.am's i.am.angel Foundation.

The song received heavy attention online following its premiere, leading it to debut in real time on the Billboard + Twitter Trending 140 chart. One week later, the song debuted on the Billboard Hot 100 on October 15, 2014 at number 26, with much of its chart data the result of streaming. Billboard reported that, according to Nielsen BDS, the song attracted six million streams in the week preceding its chart debut, nearly all from its music video on YouTube and Vevo. It sold 35,000 digital downloads, placing it on the magazine's Digital Songs chart at number 30.

== Reception ==
Jim Farber of the New York Daily News called the song "mildly amusing", remarking that "surely Fallon and Will could have come up with some wittier things for the kids to hate."

== Charts ==
Chart (2014)	Peak position
Canada Hot 100 (Billboard)	14
US Billboard Hot 100	26
US Comedy Digital Tracks (Billboard)	1
US Hot Rap Songs (Billboard)	5

== Baby Kaely version ==
One month after Fallon's original version, American female rapper Baby Kaely (10 years old at the time) posted a cover of the track to her YouTube channel, despite the adult lyrical content in Fallon's original, Most of the lyrics in the song are changed to be kid-appropriate. The most notable lyric change being "Hello, my name is Sara, That's Sarah with no H" to "Hello, my name is Zuzie, that's Suzie with a Z", as it would later go viral on TikTok in June 2021. Following the trend, she posted a reaction video of her version a month later.
