= The Bathroom Wall =

Studio album / live album by Jimmy Fallon
- Released: August 27, 2002
- Genre: Comedy rock, comedy
- Length: 36:49
- Label: DreamWorks
- Producer: The Soundhustlers

Jimmy Fallon chronology
The Bathroom Wall (2002)	Blow Your Pants Off (2012)

The Bathroom Wall is the debut studio album by American comedian Jimmy Fallon, released on August 27, 2002. The first five tracks of the album consists of studio songs, with the remainder of the album consisting of stand-up comedy material. In the music video for its song "Idiot Boyfriend", actress and singer/songwriter Zooey Deschanel has an uncredited role of Fallon's girlfriend.

== Track listing ==
No.	Title	Writer(s)	Notes	Length
1.	"Idiot Boyfriend"	Gerard Bradford, Jimmy Fallon	Studio recording	3:54
2.	"(I Can't Play) Basketball"	Bradford, Fallon	Studio recording	2:46
3.	"Drinking in the Woods"	Bradford, Fallon	Studio recording	2:53
4.	"Road Rage"	Bradford, Fallon	Studio recording	2:45
5.	"Snowball"	Bradford, Fallon	Studio recording	2:05
6.	"Hope Everyone Enjoyed Homecoming This Year"	Fallon	Live stand-up	0:22
7.	"Troll Doll Celebrities"	Fallon	Live stand-up	4:11
8.	"Dorms, Shower Baskets & the Walk of Shame"	Fallon	Live stand-up	1:44
9.	"Roommates"	Fallon	Live stand-up	1:37
10.	"Hotplates, Four Digit Numbers & the Little Fridge"	Fallon	Live stand-up	1:57
11.	"Chris Rock Was My RA"	Fallon	Live stand-up	1:40
12.	"Gotta Get a Fake I.D."	Fallon	Live stand-up	0:58
13.	"Troll Doll Jingles"	Fallon	Live stand-up	7:20
14.	"Hammertime"	Fallon	Live stand-up	2:36
Total length:				36:48

== Personnel ==
- Jimmy Fallon – guitar, harmonica, vocals, background vocals
- Gerard Bradford – guitar, background vocals
- Mark Ronson – bass, keyboards, background vocals
- Justin Stanley – drums, keyboards, background vocals
- Peter Iselin – keyboard on "Drinking In The Woods"
- Nadia Dajani – background vocals on "(I Can't Play) Basketball"

== Production ==
- Producer: The Soundhustlers
- Engineers: Ben Arons, Dan Milazzo, and Kevin Scott
- Assistant engineers: Aaron Kaplan, Doug Sanderson, Antony Zeller
- Mixing: Mark Ronson, Justin Stanley, Marie C, and Gabe Chiesa
- Mastering: Brian Gardner
- Set Design: Michael DeNaire
- Design: Kyledidthis
- Photography: Mick Rock

== Reception ==
Professional ratings
Review scores
Source	Rating
Rolling Stone	2/5 stars
AllMusic	3/5 stars

=== Reviews ===
AllMusic described it as Fallon's "mix tape of high school fights, bad athletic performances, and collegiate experimentation combined with a dose of rock & roll mayhem"; two of the songs ("Idiot Boyfriend" and "Road Rage") were AMG "Track Picks", as were two of the stand-up comedy routines ("Troll Doll Jingles" and "Hammertime").

The Rolling Stone liked the "fifteen minutes' worth of songs" and called "Idiot Boyfriend" the "second-best Prince parody ever, after Beck's 'Debra'"; the rest of the album was said to be "padded out with lame stand-up on college life (the fridges are small!), celebrity impressions and troll dolls."

=== Awards ===
The Bathroom Wall was nominated for a Grammy in 2003 as the Best Spoken Comedy Album.
