= Jet Lag Gemini =

American rock band

- Origin: Mahwah, NJ, US
- Genres: Rock, alternative rock
- Years active: 2004–2011
- Labels: Doghouse Records (2006–2011)
- Members: Michael (Misha) Zilman (lead vocals, guitar); Vlad Gheorghiu (guitar, backup vocals); Matt Gheorghiu (bass, backup vocals); Dan DiLiberto (drums)
- Website: jetlaggemini.com

Jet Lag Gemini (known as Jet Lag or JLG) was an American rock band. Formed in 2004, they released their debut EP, Business, in the summer of 2006. Their first full-length album, "Fire the Cannons" was released on January 22, 2008. They had planned on releasing their currently untitled second album early 2010, which was rumored to be produced by Mark Hoppus of Blink 182. Between 2010 and 2011 the band was dismantled.

== History ==
=== Formation And Business ===
Formed in 2004 in Mahwah, New Jersey, while all the band members were well under 21, Jet Lag Gemini has members from three different countries; Misha Zilman (formerly Safonov) is from Russia, Dan DiLiberto from the United States, and brothers Matei and Vlad Gheorghiu are from Romania. Their band name is not named after the Nintendo 64 video game Jet Force Gemini, as stated in a live internet chat on January 21, 2008. The band played their first show together on March 27, 2004. So far, JLG has performed with bands including The Matches, The All-American Rejects, Bayside, All Time Low, and festivals like Warped Tour with bands like Against Me, Angels and Airwaves, Billy Talent, and NOFX to name a few. Jet Lag Gemini was signed with Doghouse Records in April 2006, and debuted with an EP, Business in early June 2006. The album spawned one single, Geared For Action.

=== Fire the Cannons ===
They have since formed a street team, known as "The Gemini Brigade", played in the Warped Tour, and have finished recording a full-length album, Fire the Cannons, and planned it to be released on October 9, 2007. However, after joining forces with ILG for a radio campaign, the album release date was pushed back and was released on January 22, 2008. The album has spawned two singles, the first being Run This City and the second being Fit To Be Tied. The band went on to tour extensively behind the release, including shows with Hit The Lights, I Am The Avalanche, The All-American Rejects, Bowling For Soup, and Warped Tour.

=== Second studio album ===
The band is currently working on their second studio album. On February 21, 2009, while recording their second studio album, the recording studio caught fire. No one was hurt. Mark Hoppus (Blink 182) stated in an MTV interview that after Blink 182 finishes their summer reunion tour, he is planning on working with the band on their second album. He did not state whether he was producing the record or just a song. During the process of making the album, Jet Lag Gemini left their label, Doghouse Records. Between late 2010 and early 2011, Jet Lag Gemini dispersed, and a new band, Born Cages, led by Vlad formed.

== Music style and influences ==
Jet Lag Gemini has been generally labeled a Rock band, and has been influenced by other prominent rock acts like Green Day, Blink 182, and U2.

== Members ==
- Michael (Misha) Zilman (Lead vocals, Guitar)
- Vlad Gheorghiu (Guitar, backing vocals)
- Matt Gheorghiu (Bass, backing vocals)
- Dan DiLiberto (Drums, backing vocals)

== Discography ==
=== Albums ===
Album information
Business
- Released: June 2006
- Chart Positions: None
- U.S. certification: None
- U.S. Sales: N/A
- Worldwide sales: N/A
Fire the Cannons
- Released: January 22, 2008
- Chart Positions: None
- U.S. certification: None
- U.S. Sales: N/A
- Worldwide sales: N/A

=== Singles ===
Year	Title	Album	Chart positions			
Year	Title	Album	U.S. Hot 100	U.S. Pop 100	U.S. Modern Rock	U.S. Mainstream Rock
2006	Geared for Action	Business	-	-	-	-
2007	Run This City	Fire the Cannons	-	-	-	-
2008	Fit To Be Tied	Fire the Cannons	-	-	-	-

=== Music Videos ===
Geared For Action 2006 Business
Run This City 2007 Fire the Cannons
Fit To Be Tied 2008 Fire the Cannons
