= Blow Your Pants Off =

2012 album

Live album by Jimmy Fallon
- Released: June 12, 2012
- Recorded: 2009–2012
- Venue: Studio 6B, NBC Studios
- Genre: Comedy
- Length: 33:39
- Label: Warner Bros.

Jimmy Fallon chronology
The Bathroom Wall (2002)	Blow Your Pants Off (2012)	Holiday Seasoning (2024)

Blow Your Pants Off is the second album by the American actor and comedian Jimmy Fallon. It was released on June 12, 2012. It features guest appearances from Paul McCartney, Bruce Springsteen, Justin Timberlake, Dave Matthews, Eddie Vedder, Brian Williams, Big & Rich and Stephen Colbert. All of the recordings are originally from Late Night with Jimmy Fallon.

Most of the songs from the album were performed on the one-hour Jimmy Fallon's Primetime Music Special, which aired July 26, 2012 on NBC. The album won the Grammy Award for Best Comedy Album.

Professional ratings
Review scores
Source	Rating
AllMusic	4/5 stars
Consequence of Sound	C+

== Reception ==
The album debuted at number 41 on the Canadian Albums Chart. On February 10, 2013, the album won a Grammy Award for Best Comedy Album.

== Track listing ==
No.	Title	Writer(s)	Episode air date	Length
1.	"Neil Young Sings 'Fresh Prince of Bel-Air'"	Jeffrey Townes and Willard Smith	November 23, 2009	2:51
2.	"History of Rap" (feat. Justin Timberlake)	Chris Stein, Makeba Riddick, Gregory Jacobs, Missy "Misdemeanor" Elliott, Bootsy Collins, Norman Durham, Walter Morrison, DeAndre Way, Calvin Broadus, Tarik Collins, Bernard Edwards, Labi Siffre, Adam Horovitz, Larry Troutman, Rick Rubin, Clifford Harris, Darryl McDaniels, George Clinton, Jr., Justin G. Smith, Leon Haywood, Frederick Knight, Roger Troutman, Deborah Harry, Ronnie Hudson, Nile Rodgers, Woody Cunningham, Dan Balan, Mikel Hooks, Paul Simon, Cody ChesnuTT, and Joseph Simmons	September 29, 2010	2:27
3.	"Tebowie"	Mike DiCenzo, David Bowie and Gerard Bradford	January 12, 2012	2:24
4.	"Scrambled Eggs" (feat. Paul McCartney)	Gerard Bradford, Mike DiCenzo, John Lennon, Paul McCartney	December 9, 2010	2:35
5.	"The Doors Sing 'Reading Rainbow'"	Steve Horelick, Dennis Kleinman and Janet Weir	November 11, 2011	2:59
6.	"Balls in Your Mouth" (feat. Eddie Vedder)	Mike DiCenzo and Gerard Bradford	September 8, 2011	1:59
7.	"Bob Dylan Sings 'Charles in Charge'"	David Merrill Kurtz, Michael Joseph Jacobs and Al Burton		1:46
8.	"Walk of Shame" (feat. Dave Matthews)	Jimmy Fallon, Mike DiCenzo and Gerard Bradford	April 24, 2012	3:42
9.	"Slow Jam the News" (feat. Brian Williams)	James Poyser, "Captain" Kirk Douglas, Ahmir "Questlove" Thompson, Diallo Riddle, Frank "Knuckles" Walker, Tariq "Black Thought" Trotter, Bashir Salahuddin, James "Kamal" Gray, Mark Kelley, and Damon "Tuba Gooding Jr." Bryson		3:17
10.	"Cougar Huntin'" (feat. Big & Rich)	Jimmy Fallon and Gerard Bradford		2:44
11.	"Friday" (feat. Stephen Colbert & Taylor Hicks)	Clarence Jey and Patrice Wilson		3:18
12.	"Neil Young Sings 'Whip My Hair'" (feat. Bruce Springsteen)	Ronald Jackson and Janae Ratliff		3:37

Deluxe edition
No.	Title	Writer(s)	Length
1.	"Neil Young Sings 'Fresh Prince of Bel-Air'"	Jeffrey Townes and Willard Smith	2:51
2.	"History of Rap" (feat. Justin Timberlake)	Chris Stein, Makeba Riddick, Gregory Jacobs, Missy "Misdemeanor" Elliott, Bootsy Collins, Norman Durham, Walter Morrison, DeAndre Way, Calvin Broadus, Tarik Collins, Bernard Edwards, Labi Siffre, Adam Horovitz, Larry Troutman, Rick Rubin, Clifford Harris, Darryl McDaniels, George Clinton, Jr., Justin G. Smith, Leon Haywood, Frederick Knight, Roger Troutman, Deborah Harry, Ronnie Hudson, Nile Rodgers, Woody Cunningham, Dan Balan, Mikel Hooks, Paul Simon, Cody ChesnuTT, and Joseph Simmons	2:27
3.	"Tebowie"	Mike DiCenzo, David Bowie and Gerard Bradford	2:24
4.	"Scrambled Eggs" (feat. Paul McCartney)	Gerard Bradford, Mike DiCenzo, John Lennon, Paul McCartney	2:35
5.	"The Doors Sing 'Reading Rainbow'"	Steve Horelick, Dennis Kleinman and Janet Weir	2:59
6.	"Balls in Your Mouth" (feat. Eddie Vedder)	Mike DiCenzo and Gerard Bradford	1:59
7.	"My Upstairs Neighbors Are Having Sex (And Listening to the Black Eyed Peas)"	Mike DiCenzo and Gerard Bradford	1:29
8.	"Bob Dylan Sings 'Charles in Charge'"	David Merrill Kurtz, Michael Joseph Jacobs and Al Burton	1:46
9.	"Walk of Shame" (feat. Dave Matthews)	Jimmy Fallon, Mike DiCenzo and Gerard Bradford	3:42
10.	"Slow Jam the News" (feat. Brian Williams)	James Poyser, "Captain" Kirk Douglas, Ahmir "Questlove" Thompson, Diallo Riddle, Frank "Knuckles" Walker, Tariq "Black Thought" Trotter, Bashir Salahuddin, James "Kamal" Gray, Mark Kelley, and Damon "Tuba Gooding Jr." Bryson	3:17
11.	"New French Girlfriend"	Gerard Bradford and Jimmy Fallon	1:53
12.	"Cougar Huntin'" (feat. Big & Rich)	Jimmy Fallon and Gerard Bradford	2:44
13.	"You Spit When You Talk"	Jimmy Fallon and Gerard Bradford	2:26
14.	"Friday" (feat. Stephen Colbert and Taylor Hicks)	Clarence Jey and Patrice Wilson	3:18
15.	"Neil Young Sings 'Whip My Hair'" (feat. Bruce Springsteen)	Ronald Jackson and Janae Ratliff	3:37
16.	"Jeremy (Linsanity)" (iTunes, Amazon or Google Play mp3 only)		3:15
17.	"Let Us Play With Your Look" (iTunes, Amazon or Google Play mp3 only)		1:40
