= Fire the Cannons =

Studio album by Jet Lag Gemini
- Released: January 22, 2008
- Recorded: June–September 2007
- Genre: Pop punk, rock
- Label: Doghouse

Professional ratings
Review scores
Source	Rating
AllMusic	3.5/5 stars
AbsolutePunk	84%

Fire The Cannons is the debut album by rock band Jet Lag Gemini. The album spawned the singles, "Run This City" and "Fit to Be Tied". The album was released on Doghouse Records. The album was released on January 22, 2008.

== Track listing ==
1. Run This City
2. Doctor, Please (There's Something Wrong with Me)
3. The Bad Apple(s)
4. Bittersweet
5. Stepping Stone
6. Fit to Be Tied
7. Just Say How
8. If It Was Up to Me
9. Every Minute
10. Keep This with You
11. Picture Frames
