= It Was a... (Masked Christmas) =

2021 song by Jimmy Fallon, Ariana Grande and Megan Thee Stallion

Single by Jimmy Fallon, Ariana Grande and Megan Thee Stallion

from the album Holiday Seasoning
- Released: December 7, 2021
- Recorded: 2021
- Studio: Electric Lady
- Genre: Christmas; comedy
- Length: 3:00
- Label: Republic
- Songwriters: Gregory Hein; Ido Zmishlany; Jimmy Fallon; Myles William; Rami Yacoub
- Producers: Ido Zmishlany; Myles William

Jimmy Fallon singles chronology
"Ew!" (2014)	"It Was a... (Masked Christmas)" (2021)	"Almost Too Early for Christmas" (2022)

Ariana Grande singles chronology
"Save Your Tears" (remix) (2021)	"It Was a... (Masked Christmas)" (2021)	"Santa, Can't You Hear Me" (2022)

Megan Thee Stallion singles chronology
"Megan's Piano" (2021)	"It Was a... (Masked Christmas)" (2021)	"Lick" (2022)

Music video
- "It Was a... (Masked Christmas)" on YouTube

"It Was a... (Masked Christmas)" is a song by American television host, actor, and comedian Jimmy Fallon, American singer-songwriter Ariana Grande and American rapper-songwriter Megan Thee Stallion. It was released on December 7, 2021, via Republic Records. The song was written by Fallon, Gregory Hein, Ido Zmishlany, Myles William, and Rami Yacoub, and produced by Zmishlany and William. It is Fallon's first Christmas single in nearly four years since his 2017 cover of "Wonderful Christmastime" by Paul McCartney, and also his first official single since "Ew!" with will.i.am (2014). The song is included on the track listing of Fallon's third studio album, Holiday Seasoning (2024).

== Background ==
On December 6, 2021, Fallon posted the "pandemic-themed" song on Instagram and Twitter with the caption: "Guys. I can't believe I'm typing this but – I'm dropping a new single and video tonight with @ArianaGrande and @theestallion". He told Associated Press that the inspiration behind the song was messing around while he was recording at Electric Lady Studios in Manhattan in August, explaining: "I wanted to write something reflecting on how tough it was for everyone last year during the holidays and that it's gonna get better." "If we can get people to go get the booster or get the vaccine, that’d be amazing. If not, hopefully it just makes people smile and have a good time." "That was kind of a wake-up call where you think, 'Why not do as much as we can to make people happy?' We forget about these things. And this is a great time to celebrate and get together". The song also marks the second collaboration between Grande and Megan Thee Stallion, after her feature on the remix of Grande's "34+35", alongside Doja Cat.

== Content ==
Fallon stated on The Tonight Show: "It's basically about how last year was just rough on everybody. I wanted to say 'it's going to get better. It really is going to get better, trust me,' and how can I portray that? And also think about what funny things have happened while we were in lockdown, like putting Purell on everything or going on a Zoom, Zooming your grandpa and grandma and seeing where the Wi-Fi works best. So I write this song".

== Composition ==
In a press release, "It Was a... (Masked Christmas)" was described as having "bubbly, '80s-esque synths and a sharp, mix-filling beat evocative of early '00s pop", and that Fallon "delivers the track's lead vocal with far more aplomb than expected from a late-night talk show host, adding colour to Grande's ethereal singing with his bold, autotune-inflected flair". It is written in the key of D major, with a tempo of 124 beats per minute.

== Critical reception ==
Lester Fabian Brathwaite of Entertainment Weekly commented that the song "brings all the retro ho-ho-holiday charm of a 'Last Christmas', very Wham! featuring George Michael vibes".

== Music video ==
The music video was premiered on The Tonight Show aired on December 6, 2021. It showcases Fallon, Grande and Stallion "in a series of Christmas-themed settings", like "drinking eggnog by an open fire, skiing down a mountain, dancing inside a snow globe and lining up for their vaccine booster shots". For Stallion's verse, she "appears wearing vaccine needles glued to her fingernails".

== Charts ==
Chart performance for "It Was a... (Masked Christmas)"
Chart (2021)	Peak position
Canada CHR/Top 40 (Billboard)	44
Canada Hot AC (Billboard)	45
South Korea Download (Gaon)	196
US Holiday Digital Songs (Billboard)	37
US Pop Airplay (Billboard)	38
