= Amber Marie Bollinger =

American actor

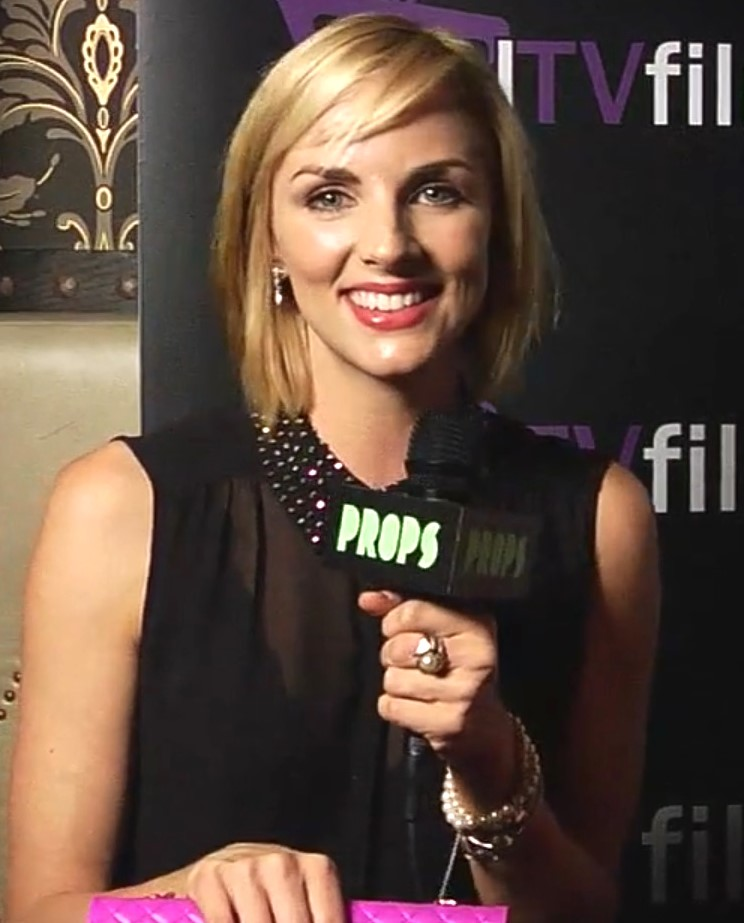
- Bollinger in 2012
- Born: Amber Marie Bollinger
- Occupation: Actress
- Years active: 2006–present

Amber Marie Bollinger is an American actress. She is best known for her 2014 film Listening.

== Life and career ==
Amber Marie Bollinger graduated from Bellevue High School. In high school, Bollinger played volleyball, basketball, and track & field. In 2000, Bollinger won the Ohio High School Athletic Association Division 2 girls high jump with a jump of 5'8". She was admitted into the Bellevue Sports Hall of Fame in 2010.

She has appeared in many national television commercials, short films, and several feature-length films. In 2014, she played in the Sci-Fi drama, Listening, which she received the Best Actress Award for her performance as 'Jordan' from Irvine International Film Festival. She was also noted as one of the top-5 actresses of 2015 by 'Starpulse' .

== Works ==
Year	Title	Role	Notes
2006	Living in Technicolor	Production assistant	Short
2008	Stratagem	Maven Teleza	(Also stunt performer)
2008	You've Been Tubed	Lily Beau/Rachel Summers	Short
2009	Bountiful Bounty	Jennifer	Short
2009	Keep Dreaming	Lauren	TV movie
2009	Sutures	Nurse Melody	
2009	Acting School Academy	Gwendolyn Ravenwood/Gwendolyn Grand	TV series
2009	Meat Puppet	Julianne	Short
2010	Let the Guilt Go	School Girl	Korn Music Video
2010	Pelt	Jessica	
2011–2013	Hollywood Is Hard	Creator/Writer/Director(1Ep.)/Producer	TV series
2011–2013	Hollywood Is Hard	Kimmy Kim/David Bowie	TV series
2011	Hell-O-Ween	Ronni	
2011	Zombies and Assholes	Carrie	Short
2011	Panman	Francine	
2011	The Death and Return of Superman	Metropolitan	Short – As Kimmy Kim
2012	Sera's Chronicles: The Prologue	Sera	Short
2012	COPS: Skyrim	Bar Maid	TV series
2012	Last Remnants	Ellen Laird	Short
2013	The Real World: Whiterun		TV series
2013	Huff	Brixi	
2012	20-Nothing: The Dirty Doctor	Dr. Kiki Brownstone	Short
2013	Cavemen	Peggy	
2013	Buckles	Katie	Short
2014	TV Activist	Terry Miles	
2014	Listening	Jordan	
2015	Fade In	Lauren	Short
2015	True Nightmares	Sara	TV series (1Ep.)
2016	Drugs & Other Love	Foxy	
2016	Dog Park		Short
2017	Rekindled	Kate's BFF	Short
2017	Undying	Ashley	Feature
2017	Malacostraca	Sophie	(Filming)
2018	Paloma's Flight	Lindsey	(Post Production)
