= The Damnwells =

American indie rock band

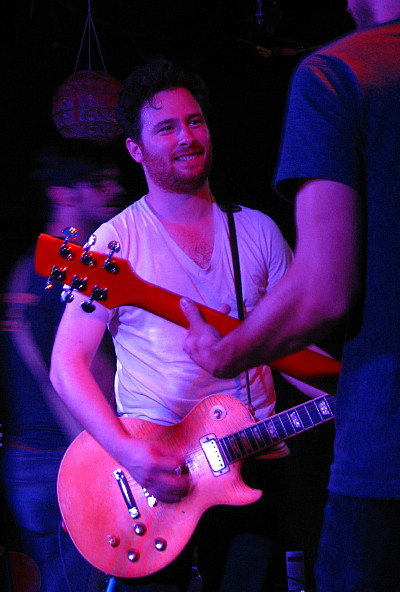
- Alex Dezen of the Damnwells on stage at The Saint, Asbury Park, NJ, on September 23, 2011.

Background information
- Origin: Brooklyn, New York City, U.S.
- Genres: Indie, rock, alternative
- Years active: 2000–2016, 2023–present
- Labels: Epic (2003–2006), Zoe/Rounder (2006–2008), PledgeMusic (2010), Rock Ridge Music (2015)
- Members: David Chernis; Alex Dezen; Ted Hudson; Steven Terry
- Website: thedamnwells.band

The Damnwells are an indie rock band originally from the Brooklyn borough of New York City. The band formed in 2000 and released six full-length albums in their original run: Air Stereo (2006, Epic Records/Rounder Records), Bastards of the Beat (2003, Epic Records), One Last Century (2009, self-released), No One Listens to the Band Anymore (2011, PledgeMusic), The Damnwells (2015, PledgeMusic) and Bad At Beautiful (2024). The original and current members of the Damnwells are Alex Dezen (lead vocals, guitar, piano), David Chernis (lead guitar), Ted Hudson (bass), and Steven Terry (drums/percussion). Steven Terry played drums and recorded with Ryan Adams' original band Whiskeytown on the album Strangers Almanac. Over their 16-year career, they toured extensively throughout the United States and had numerous television and radio appearances. Although David Chernis and Steven Terry left the band from 2007 to 2013, the Damnwells, with core members Alex Dezen and Ted Hudson, still appeared in changing formations during that time.

== Band history ==
The Damnwells first album, Bastards of the Beat, was recorded in a Manhattan Mini-Storage space and in lead singer and songwriter Alex Dezen's bedroom. It was initially picked up for release by Sixthman Records (now Brash Records), but soon caught the attention of former Sony Music A&R representative Ben Goldman, who signed the band and released the album on Epic Records (Sony/BMG) in April 2003. The Damnwells' second full-length album, Air Stereo, was recorded at Brooklyn Recording studios in Brooklyn, NY for Epic Records, but was licensed to Zoe/Rounder Records after the band was let go from their recording contract with Epic Records in January 2006. Air Stereo was released in stores nationwide on August 15, 2006.

The 2008 motion picture Chaos Theory featured five Damnwells songs on its soundtrack. The Damnwells came into media spotlight in 2007, when the film's lead actor Ryan Reynolds and actress Scarlett Johansson were first seen as a couple at a Damnwells concert in Hollywood.

Across extensive touring in the mid-2000s The Damnwells shared the stage with acts such as The Chicks, Cheap Trick, The Fray, Bob Dylan, The Twilight Singers, and Old 97s. They appeared at major music festivals such as South by Southwest, and play with some regularly at music venues around the country.

On April 4, 2008, Alex Dezen announced through the band's website that the band would most likely not appear in its original formation anymore. "The Damnwells has always been about my songs with extremely talented musicians and producers collaborating," Dezen wrote. "The personnel has changed, but the essence [...] remains the same." In December 2013, the band announced that Drummer Steven Terry and Guitarist David Chernis had rejoined the band to record the band's 5th LP. Over the years, the band collective has included artists like Julian Velard, Jay Barclay (member of Augustana (band) and Ben Kweller's band), Mark Stepro (member of Butch Walker's band), and the members of Harper Blynn.

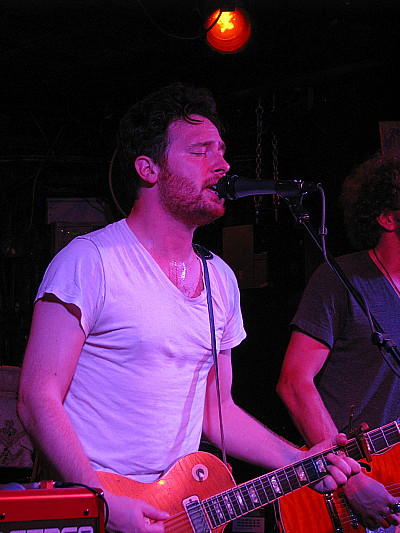
Alex Dezen of the Damnwells during performance at The Saint, September 2011

On February 10, 2009, the third full-length LP, One Last Century, was released as a free download from Paste Magazine. It was recorded together with drummer Andrew Ratcliffe, bassist Adrian Dickey, producer/guitarist Freddy Wall, and producer Wes Kidd. About the record, Alex Dezen had this to say: "I just want people to hear this music, and I don’t want them to have to enter into some kind of contractual agreement with a third party to do so. Download the record, copy it and give it to your friends, lovers, and enemies. Whatever. It’s so hard these days just to get the actual music into people’s houses and cars, let alone their ears. Besides, I know everyone’s broke, maybe I can supply the soundtrack. So, I just want to give this music away because I want people to hear it. I should have done this years ago. I’m starting over."

The Damnwells released No One Listens to the Band Anymore in the US on March 1, 2011, via PledgeMusic.

In 2013, the original Damnwells lineup (Dezen, Chernis, Hudson and Terry) reunited for the first time in seven years to record the band's eponymous fifth album. "The Damnwells" was released April 14, 2015, following another successful campaign on PledgeMusic. The band toured the US throughout May and June, 2015, in support of the release. A music video was produced for the single "Lost."

On June 8, 2023, the band announced a new single, Without a Heart, would be released on June 22, 2023.

The Damnwells announced on January 19, 2024, via Facebook that they are back with a new album of songs, reuniting the original four members. The album, released via a Kickstarter project, titled "Bad At Beautiful" was released August 9, 2024.

== Golden Days documentary ==
An independent documentary detailing The Damnwells' struggles on Epic Records, entitled Golden Days, was completed in 2007. The film was directed and shot by documentary filmmaker Chris Suchorsky, who also directed music videos for the Damnwells' songs "Kiss Catastrophe" and "Sleepsinging", and won Best Documentary at the 2007 Phoenix Film Festival in April 2007 after appearing at over a dozen film festivals in the US and Europe.

== PledgeMusic projects ==
In February 2010, the Damnwells began a pledge drive to cover the production costs of a new studio record through a direct-to-fan/fan-funded music platform, Pledgemusic. As of October 9, 2010, the band had raised over $34,547, 173% of their initial goal of $20,000, and released two songs to pledgers, "She Goes Around" and "Feast of Hearts", from the new Pledgemusic-funded record. $2,909.40 has been donated to United Against Malaria as part of the pledge campaign charity drive.

In December 2013, The Damnwells began a new pledge drive in anticipation of their fifth studio album, which features original members Steven Terry, David Chernis, Ted Hudson, and Alex Dezen. Entitled "The Damnwells", the album was released on April 14, 2015.

== Alex Dezen (songwriter and solo career) ==
As a songwriter, Alex Dezen has written songs that have appeared on albums by Justin Bieber, Cody Simpson, Matt Hires, and Courtyard Hounds. He has also written and worked with a number of other artist such as The Dixie Chicks, Dave Grohl, Gary Louris of The Jayhawks, Sara Bareilles, Jason Derulo, Christina Perri, Genevieve Schatz of Company of Thieves, Kelly Clarkson, Simple Plan, and many others. He's currently signed to Warner Chappell Music Publishing. As a guitar player and singer, Alex Dezen has performed on albums for such artists as Cody Simpson, Matt Hires, Stoney LaRue, Justin Bieber, and others.

A series of 4 solo EPs, known as "The Bedhead EPs," were released in 2014.

On November 3, 2015, Dezen announced a PledgeMusic project of songs written in early 2015 to be released as his first solo album. The project reached its crowdfunding goal in one week. The project was scheduled to be released in February 2016.

Alex Dezen is a graduate of the MFA program at the University of Iowa's Iowa Writers' Workshop, where he also taught Rhetoric and Creative Writing from 2008 to 2010.

== Song appearances ==
=== Film ===
- Just Married Soundtrack (2003) (song: "For My Own Good")
- Chaos Theory (film) Soundtrack (2008) (song: "Electric Harmony," "Say," "Graceless," "Tonight & Forever," "Golden Days")
- The Howling: Reborn Soundtrack (2011) (song: "I Will Keep the Bad Things from You")

=== Television ===
- "Ed (TV series)" - Wheel of Justice (2002) (song: "4th Avenue")
- "Life As We Know It (TV series)" - A Little Problem (2005) (song: "Star/Fool")
- "Brothers & Sisters (2006 TV series)" - From France with Love (2009) (song: "Come to Me")

== Discography ==
=== Albums ===
- Bastards of the Beat (2003)
- Air Stereo (2006)
- One Last Century (2009)
- No One Listens To The Band Anymore (2011)
- The Damnwells (2015)
- Bad At Beautiful (2024)

=== EPs ===
- Heart Hazard
- PMR ("Poor Man's Record") (2002), re-released as PMR+1 (2003)
- There's No One Left in Brooklyn But You (2005, iTunes digital download exclusive)

=== Singles ===
- "Kiss Catastrophe" (2003)
- "Sleepsinging" (2003)
- "Golden Days" (2006)
- "Werewolves" (2011)
- "Lost" (2015)
- "Without a Heart" (2023)
- "Easy, Tiger (feat. Morgan Wade)" (2024)
- "Pretty as Pittsburgh" (2024)
