= Jimmy Fallon =

American comedian and television host (born 1974)

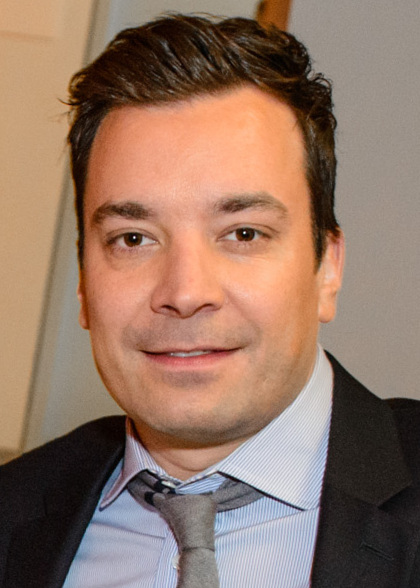
- Fallon in 2013
- Born: James Thomas Fallon; September 19, 1974 (age 52); Brooklyn, New York City, U.S.
- Education: College of Saint Rose (BA)
- Spouse: Nancy Juvonen (m. 2007)
- Children: 2

Comedy career
- Years active: 1995–present
- Medium: Stand-up; television; film; music; books
- Genres: Observational comedy; musical comedy; sketch comedy; clean comedy; impressions; satire
- Subjects: American culture; American politics; everyday life; pop culture; current events

James Thomas Fallon (born September 19, 1974) is an American comedian, television host, actor, singer, writer, and producer, best known for his work in television.

Fallon grew up with a love of comedy and music, moving to Los Angeles when he turned 21 to pursue stand-up comedy. He joined the NBC sketch comedy series Saturday Night Live as a cast member in 1998, fulfilling a lifelong dream. During his six years on SNL, Fallon co-hosted the program's Weekend Update segment. He left the show in 2004 to star in films such as Taxi (2004) and Fever Pitch (2005). After his film career, Fallon returned to television as the host of Late Night with Jimmy Fallon on NBC in 2009, where he was noted for a focus on music and video games. In 2014, he left that show to become the sixth permanent host of The Tonight Show.

Fallon has also released two comedy albums and seven books, mainly aimed at children. His accolades include four Primetime Emmy Awards and a Grammy Award.

== Early life ==
James Thomas Fallon was born in Bay Ridge, Brooklyn, New York City, on September 19, 1974, the son of Gloria (née Feeley) and James W. Fallon. His paternal grandmother was a German immigrant from Osterholz-Scharmbeck, while his maternal great-grandfather was a Norwegian immigrant from Fredrikstad. One set of his great-great-grandparents were an Irish couple from County Galway, with this great-great-grandmother herself being born to an Irish couple in France.

Fallon's father spent his adolescence singing in street-corner doo-wop groups then served in the Vietnam War. Shortly after his son's birth, he started working as a machine repairman for IBM in Kingston, New York. In preparation, the family moved nearby to Saugerties, New York. Fallon has described his childhood as idyllic, while his parents have been described as overprotective. He and his older sister, Gloria, were not allowed to leave their home by themselves and so had to ride their bicycles in the backyard. Fallon attended the Roman Catholic school St. Mary of the Snow. He considered becoming a priest, inspired by his experiences as an altar boy, but became more interested in comedy instead. He spent many nights listening to the radio program The Dr. Demento Show, which exposed him to both comedy and music; he often recorded it on a reel-to-reel recorder.

As a teenager, Fallon developed an obsession with the late-night comedy program Saturday Night Live. He watched it religiously, although he was only allowed to see "the clean parts" that his parents taped for him. He and Gloria would re-enact sketches such as "The Festrunk Brothers" with friends. In his teens, he impressed his parents with impersonations, including of actor James Cagney and comedian Dana Carvey. He was musically inclined and started playing guitar at age 13, going on to perform comedy and music in contests and shows. By his junior high years, he was labeled a class clown but was also described as "nice and well-mannered".

At Saugerties High School, Fallon was a performer in most stage productions and was twice a class social director. He won a young comedian's contest with an impression of Pee-wee Herman. He graduated in 1992 and then attended The College of Saint Rose in Albany, New York, where he was a computer science major before switching to communications in his senior year. He was an average student who would perform stand-up comedy on weekends. He would often board buses from his aunt's house in Fort Hamilton to perform sets at Carolines on Broadway in Times Square. He did not graduate, leaving college a semester early to pursue a comedy career.

Fourteen years later, in May 2009, Fallon returned to receive a Bachelor of Arts in communications, awarded by Saint Rose officials who granted him experiential learning credits for his television work. He joined his classmates at the Saratoga Performing Arts Center to collect his degree, where along with his BA, he was also awarded an honorary Doctor of Humane Letters.

== Career ==
=== Comedy beginnings ===
Fallon dropped out of the College of Saint Rose in 1995 to move to Los Angeles and pursue comedy full-time. He secured a manager and got bookings by the age of 21. He often did stand-up at the Improv, earning $7.50 per set, and he joined classes with the Groundlings, an improv comedy troupe. He appeared in the feature film The Scheme (originally entitled The Entrepreneurs). His one line in the 1997 film Father's Day was cut, but he can still be seen in the background. In 1998, Fallon appeared briefly on the show Spin City in the second season as a man selling photographs.

He remained fixated on joining Saturday Night Live. After two years of working with the Groundlings, he auditioned for the program in 1997 but was unsuccessful. When he was cast in a pilot presentation for The WB, Fallon made sure to include a clause in his contract specifying that if he were to join SNL he would be released from his contract. His manager sent videotapes to Marci Klein and Ayala Cohen, producers for SNL.

This was my ultimate goal. If I ever cut into a birthday cake and made a wish, I would wish to be on SNL. If I threw a coin into a fountain, I would wish to be on SNL. If I saw a shooting star, I would wish to be on SNL. ... I remember saying to myself, 'If I don't make it on [the show] before I'm 25, I'm going to kill myself.' It's crazy. I had no other plan. I didn't have friends, I didn't have a girlfriend, I didn't have anything going on. I had my career, that was it.

Fallon landed his second audition at the age of 23. At the "notoriously difficult audition", he was told by several people that creator Lorne Michaels almost never laughed during auditions. He feared being outshined by the comic before him, who came armed with an arsenal of props. Despite this, Fallon went onstage and did well, performing a "celebrity walk-a-thon" with impressions of Jerry Seinfeld, Chris Rock, Bill Cosby, and Adam Sandler, an SNL alumnus who had recently left the show. Michaels and others laughed.

Head writer Tina Fey, who was in the room, later said, "He's one of two people I've ever seen who was completely ready to be on the show. Kristen Wiig is the other one ... And Jimmy was ready—like, if there had been a show to do that night." He rushed through his original characters in order to arrive at his musical impressions, which he felt were stronger. Three weeks passed, and despite his feeling that he had not gotten the position, he was asked to meet with Michaels at the Paramount lot in Los Angeles. Michaels informed him that they wanted him for the show, and Fallon characterized the moment as being in "slow motion", remarking to Michaels before he left, "I'm going to make you proud."

=== Saturday Night Live years ===
==== Early seasons (1998–2000) ====
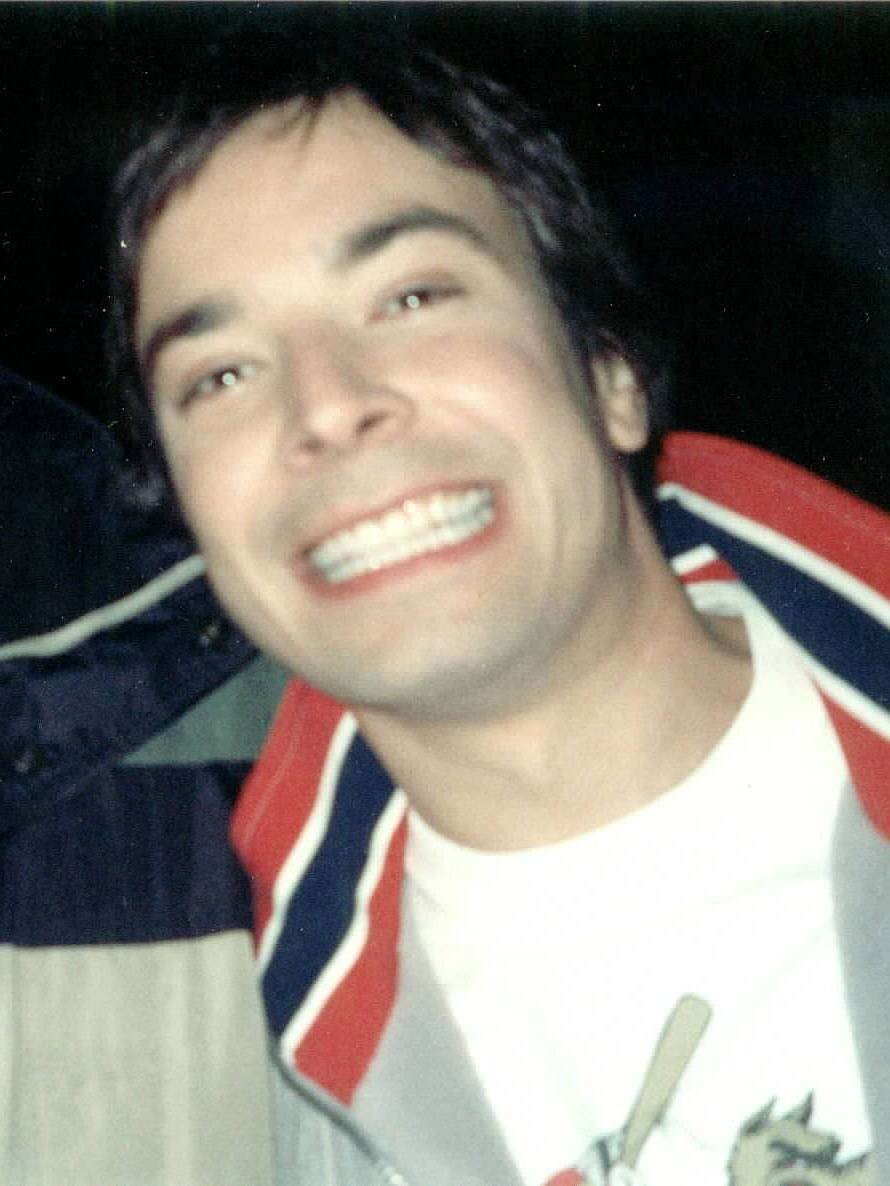
Fallon in 2004

Fallon debuted on Saturday Night Live as a featured player at the beginning of the show's twenty-fourth season in September 1998. He became a star by his fourth episode, when he performed Halloween-themed versions of songs by popular artists, as well as his Sandler impression. Fallon became a celebrity, considered charming by his largely female fan-base, receiving numerous letters from fans, and becoming the subject of numerous fan-sites. He became the program's most featured mimic, doing popular impressions of Robert De Niro, Jerry Seinfeld, and Howard Stern. He also starred as many original characters, including Nick Burns, an IT support nerd, Pat "Sully" Sullivan, one of the Boston Teens with Rachel Dratch, and in Jarret's Room, a fictional webcast hosted by stoner college students Jarret (Fallon) and Gobi (Horatio Sanz). He was promoted to repertory player in his second season.

In his off-time, Fallon released a book comprising e-mail exchanges with his sister Gloria, titled I Hate This Place: A Pessimist's Guide to Life (1999), and played a minor role in the film Almost Famous (2000). During their time at SNL, Fallon and Horatio Sanz often drank together. Sanz has described himself and Fallon as "super-functioning alcoholics", and said, "They say that kind of goes hand-in-hand with SNL, some kind of substance-abuse issues, because it's so stressful you easily find yourself blowing off steam a lot." On one occasion, they spent a Friday night watching The Strokes perform a midnight show, staying up drinking until the early morning, despite having to do SNL that night. "We actually took what we thought being on SNL was, what people think is awesome about it, and we made it happen," said Sanz, who said that he and Fallon got in more than a few bar fights.

==== Later years (2001–2004) ====
Fallon initially planned to spend three years at SNL, like John Belushi, but he was persuaded to stay on for three more when given the reins to Weekend Update. His co-hosting of Weekend Update with writer Tina Fey further increased his profile. During this tenure, he formed a close relationship with Michaels, whom he'd consult on dating, career advice, and more. Fallon called a December 2001 sketch, in which he imitates Rolling Stones frontman Mick Jagger in a mirror opposite Jagger, his favorite thing he had done up to that point.

In his later years on SNL, Fallon co-starred in a skit, "The Barry Gibb Talk Show", in which he and musician Justin Timberlake portrayed Bee Gees brothers Barry and Robin Gibb. It marked the beginning of a long-running friendship and collaboration with Timberlake.

Fallon became known for his tendency to break character in sketches, an attribute he, as well as Michaels, disliked. It began in the famous "More Cowbell" sketch, when Will Ferrell wore a tighter shirt than expected, causing Fallon to crack up. After this, other cast members would try to get Fallon to break. Some cast members believed he was attempting to steal the moment, to make the sketch about himself. The joke became near-constant during Fallon's final year on the show. During this time, Fallon parlayed his SNL success into co-hosting the 2001 MTV Movie Awards and 2002 MTV Video Music Awards, and recording his debut comedy album, The Bathroom Wall (2002), which was nominated for the Grammy Award for Best Comedy Album. He also modeled for Calvin Klein. Fallon was named one of People magazine's 50 Most Beautiful People in 2002, an honor Fallon found embarrassing.

Fallon appeared in blackface in a 2000 episode of Saturday Night Live, impersonating Chris Rock. After the sketch resurfaced online 20 years later, Fallon issued a tweet apologizing for an "unquestionably offensive decision".

=== Film career (2004–2008) ===
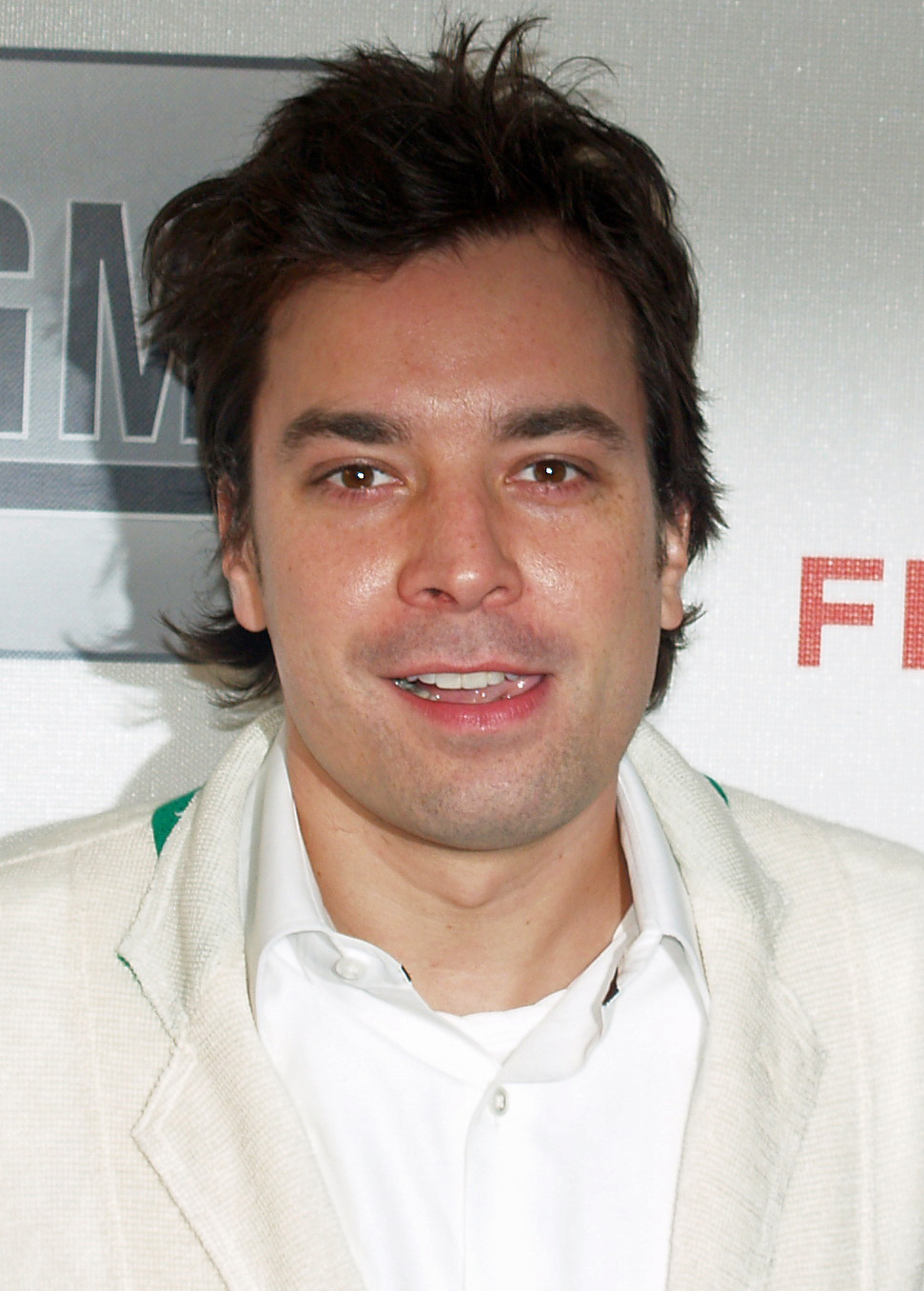
Fallon in 2007

Fallon began to pursue a film career in 2004. He had spurned most major roles due to lack of time and disinterest in the dozens of scripts he read. He signed on for his first lead role in Taxi, a remake of a French film, after co-star Queen Latifah became attached to the project. He was also attracted to the film's action comedy tone, seeing comparisons with SNL alumnus Eddie Murphy's first big film, 48 Hrs. (1982).

In the fall of 2003, he split his time between shooting the film in Los Angeles and returning to New York City for SNL. With his contract ending, his sixth season at SNL was his last; Fallon signed off at the conclusion of the show's twenty-ninth season in May 2004.

With big expectations from the studio, Taxi premiered in the fall of 2004. A flop with critics and audiences, it was Fallon's first failure. 20th Century Fox had already signed him for his second major role, starring opposite Drew Barrymore in the 2005 romantic comedy Fever Pitch. Fever Pitch fared little better than Taxi, receiving mild reviews and tepid box office returns. He met his wife, producer Nancy Juvonen, during production of the film, and the two wed in December 2007.

Fallon began receiving fewer film offers. He later described this period as a "lost period", during which he consumed more alcohol and struggled to determine the direction of his career. Fallon moved back east to New York, spending "a couple of years aimlessly knocking around". He wrote a screenplay during this time "about a guy in a goth band who has to pretend to be a country-music star".

Before leaving SNL, Michaels had told Fallon that he would be a good fit to take over NBC's Late Night franchise when then-host Conan O'Brien left for The Tonight Show. Michaels urged NBC to give Fallon a holding deal in February 2007 so that he could not be lured elsewhere.

To prepare for the role of a late-night host, Fallon toured college campuses and comedy clubs for eight months, where he tested out a new 50-minute routine. He also began watching the comedy of Chevy Chase, Dick Cavett, and Johnny Carson, as well as The Larry Sanders Show. In May 2008, Fallon was announced as the successor to O'Brien's Late Night.

Fallon was considered an odd choice for the job, both by executives at NBC (who "hated" the idea and predicted it to be a failure) and among the general public. This was alluded to in an early promo for the series: "You loved him on SNL! You hated him in the movies! Now you're ambivalent."

=== Back to television and Late Night (2009–2013) ===
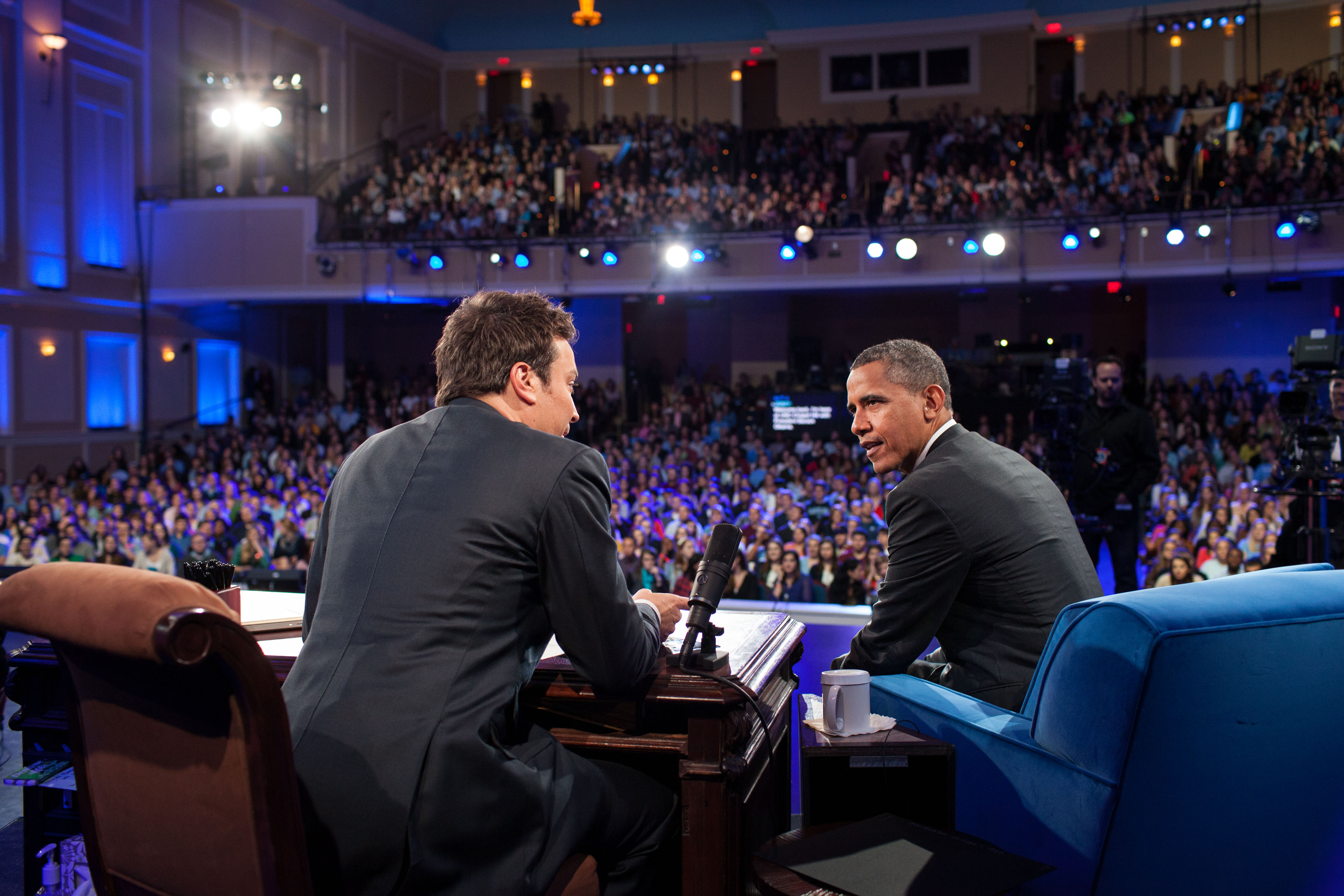
Late Night's Fallon (left) interviews President Barack Obama on the campus of UNC at Chapel Hill in April 2012.

Late Night with Jimmy Fallon premiered in March 2009 to mixed reviews. Producer Michael Shoemaker felt that the show's style solidified when it used Susan Boyle as a joke. While other late-night programs had centered on her appearance, Fallon's Late Night debuted a sketch in which Boyle's emotional performances could "salve any affliction". It was this style of humor, that Adam Sternbergh of New York dubbed "the comedy of unabashed celebration", that led to the program's success.

Fallon proved himself different from other late-night hosts, with more of a reliance on music, dancing, impersonations, and games. Between his own musical sensibilities and the recruitment of his house band, hip-hop collective The Roots, Fallon's incarnation of Late Night "evolved into the most deeply musical of TV's musical-comedy variety programs", with sketches in which he parodies Neil Young and Bruce Springsteen going viral online.

Fallon's show found its footing in 2010, during The Tonight Show debacle. The program embraced social media and the Internet, and online interaction and its presence on the show became crucial to its success. In 2010, the show scored its first viral clip: Fallon and Timberlake performing a "History of Rap".

Fallon also hosted the 62nd Primetime Emmy Awards in 2010. In 2012, Fallon released his second comedy album, Blow Your Pants Off, which compiles many of his musical performances on Late Night. The album won a Grammy in 2013 for Best Comedy Album. Discussions for Fallon to take over The Tonight Show began in early 2013.

As of August 2013, Fallon was earning a salary of $11 million a year for his work on Late Night.

=== The Tonight Show (2014–present) ===
On April 3, 2013, following a period of speculation, NBC announced that Fallon would succeed Jay Leno, following the 2014 Winter Olympics, to become the sixth permanent host of The Tonight Show. Fallon and Leno sang a parody of the song "Tonight" about The Tonight Show together. Fallon's Tonight Show debut on February 17, 2014, on NBC's network engaged 11.3 million viewers.

Fallon's third book, Your Baby's First Word Will Be Dada, a children's book, was released in June 2015.

On September 15, 2016, Fallon hosted Donald Trump on The Tonight Show during the United States presidential election. Following the appearance, Fallon was criticized by some media critics and viewers on social media for the uncontroversial questions he asked of Trump. In response to the criticism, Fallon said to TMZ: "Have you seen my show? I'm never too hard on anyone. We'll have Hillary [Clinton] on tomorrow, and we'll do something fun with her too." Fallon apologized in March 2017 for the interview, saying "I didn't do it to humanize him. I almost did it to minimize him. I didn't think that would be a compliment ... After this happened, I was devastated. I didn't mean anything by it. I was just trying to have fun." He again apologized for the interview in June 2018 on a podcast with The Hollywood Reporter, saying that he "made a mistake" and added "I did not do it to 'normalize' him or to say I believe in his political beliefs or any of that stuff."

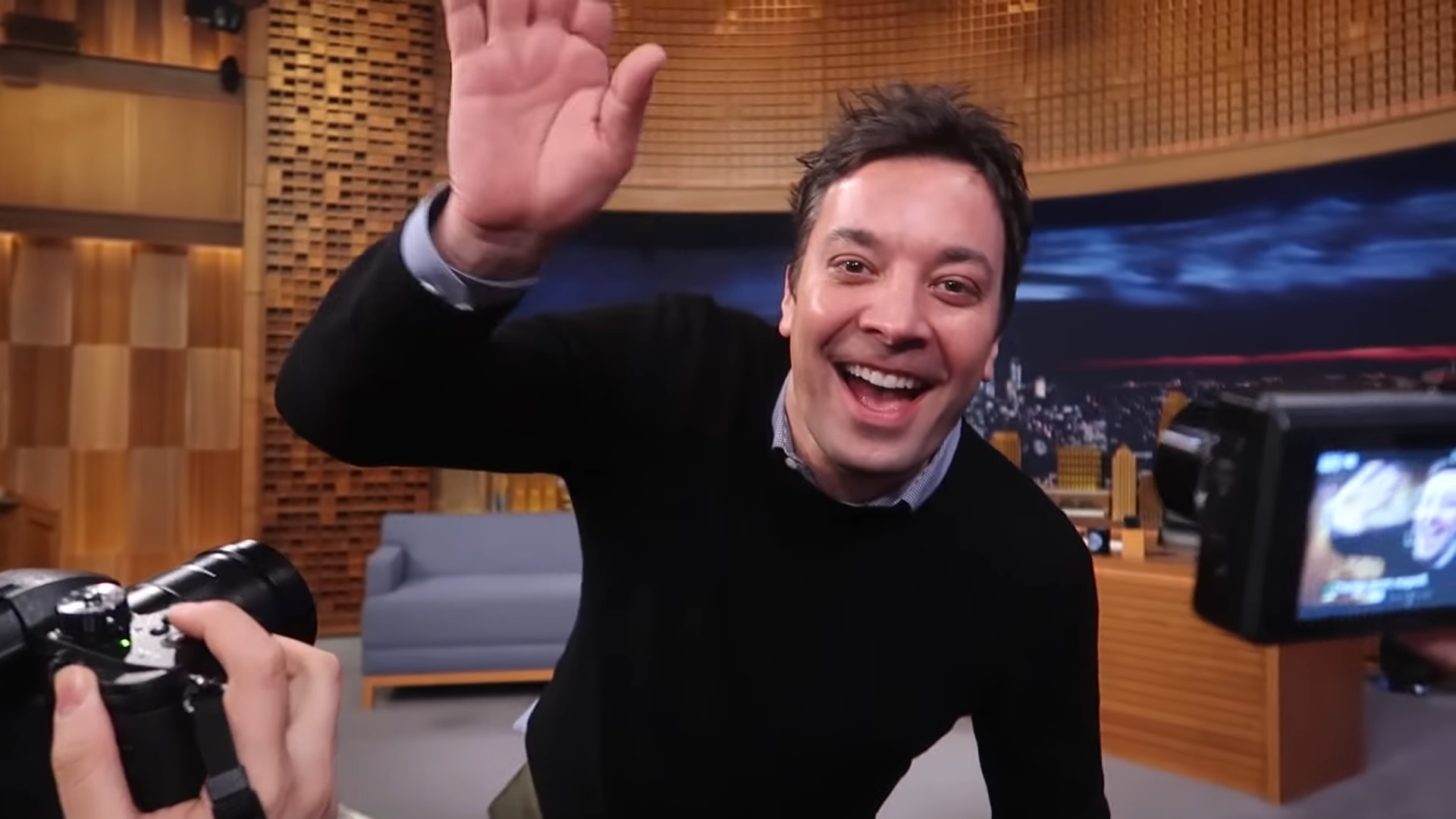
Fallon on the set of The Tonight Show in 2019

In 2020, Fallon and pacifier company WubbaNub created limited-edition pacifiers based on the penguin and cow characters from his children's books.

In January 2022, Fallon was criticized for discussing NFTs (and promoting one of his own) on his show during an interview with Paris Hilton, which may have breached conflict-of-interest policies set by NBCUniversal's parent company Comcast; his own NFT was deduced to have most likely been purchased in November 2021 for about $216,000, and his promotion of it on the show could have boosted its asking price. NBC responded to the criticism by stating that it did not believe Fallon had broken its conflict-of-interest rules.

On November 16, 2022, a Twitter hoax spread with the hashtag #RIPJimmyFallon, which started trending nationwide. Fallon asked Twitter owner Elon Musk for help, who joked "Say something that only the real Jimmy would say..." On his show the following day, Fallon made fun of the rumors in a skit described by Vulture as "tent revival-esque".

In September 2023, Rolling Stone published an article about Fallon and The Tonight Show workplace culture titled "Chaos, Comedy, and 'Crying Rooms': Inside Jimmy Fallon's 'Tonight Show'", based on interviews with 16 former and then-active employees. It alleged that Fallon mistreated his staff, acted erratically, was prone to outbursts, and contributed to a toxic workplace culture. According to former employees, Fallon's behavior on a given day seemed to be related to whether he was allegedly hungover from the previous night. The abuse led to many employees referring to the special guests' dressing rooms as the crying rooms because that is where the employees would go to let out their emotions. NBC released a statement, defending the program, but they did not address the allegations against Fallon. The day of the article's publication, he apologized to his staff on a Zoom call, saying: "It's embarrassing and I feel so bad. Sorry if I embarrassed you and your family and friends."

=== Other broadcasts ===
On November 29, 2021, Fallon debuted a new NBC game show called That's My Jam, composed of musical games of the style featured on The Tonight Show. It was renewed for a second season in 2022 and a third season in 2023.

On August 30, 2023, Fallon began hosting the comedy podcast Strike Force Five with Stephen Colbert, Seth Meyers, Jimmy Kimmel, and John Oliver to support their staff members out of work due to the 2023 Writers Guild of America strike.

On September 30, 2025, Fallon and cohost Bozoma Saint John debuted On Brand with Jimmy Fallon, an NBC reality show where contestants create advertising campaigns for brands like Pillsbury and Southwest Airlines.

== Influences ==
Fallon told David Steinberg on the Showtime series Inside Comedy that as a child he and his sister would imitate Steve Martin and Dan Aykroyd's "Wild and Crazy Guys" routines from Saturday Night Live, and that he listened to comedy records, learning to imitate Rodney Dangerfield from them. In 2009 he spoke on the influence of Monty Python when he appeared in the television documentary, Monty Python: Almost the Truth (Lawyers Cut).

== Personal life ==
Fallon married film producer Nancy Juvonen on December 22, 2007. They initially met on the set of Saturday Night Live, but they did not become friends until later on the set of Fever Pitch. Fallon proposed in August 2007 with a bespoke engagement ring on the dock of Juvonen's family home in Wolfeboro, New Hampshire. They were married four months later. Their daughters were born via surrogate in 2013 and 2014. They own a house in Sagaponack, New York, and previously lived in Gramercy Park, Manhattan; they also have a female English cream Golden Retriever named Gary Frick that has appeared on Late Night with Jimmy Fallon.

On November 4, 2017, Fallon's mother Gloria died from undisclosed causes at the age of 68 at NYU Langone Medical Center. Scheduled tapings of the following week's Tonight Show episodes were canceled. One week later, Fallon paid tribute to his mother following that night's monologue, becoming emotional and calling her "the best audience".

Fallon was raised Roman Catholic. In a 2011 interview with NPR, he expressed his fondness for the Latin Mass, but he stated he was no longer a regular churchgoer.

=== Health problems ===
On June 26, 2015, Fallon suffered a ring avulsion injury when he tripped over a rug in his home and tried to break his fall by holding onto a countertop, causing his finger to nearly get torn off by his wedding ring. He was taken to the emergency room and then sent to a surgeon who performed microsurgery on his finger. He spent 10 days in the ICU before going home. He discussed this on the July 13 episode of The Tonight Show and thanked the doctors and nurses who helped him. A month later, he was still expecting to spend another eight weeks without any feeling in his finger. In an interview with Billboard magazine in September 2015, he explained that his finger still had limited mobility and that another surgery would be required. He reiterated this point at the 67th Emmy Awards on September 20, 2015, when he appeared in public without his finger bandaged for the first time since the accident.

On January 4, 2022, Fallon announced that he had tested positive for COVID-19 over the holiday season. He thanked medical professionals and credited the COVID-19 vaccine with making him "lucky enough to only have mild symptoms".

== Filmography ==
=== Film ===
Year	Title	Role	Notes
2000	Almost Famous	Dennis Hope	
2002	The Rutles 2: Can't Buy Me Lunch	Reporter	
2003	Anything Else	Bob	
2003	The Scheme	Ray	Filmed in 1998
2004	Taxi	Det. Andrew "Andy" Washburn	
2005	Fever Pitch	Ben Wrightman	
2006	Doogal	Dylan (voice)	
2006	Arthur and the Invisibles	Prince Betameche (voice)	
2006	Factory Girl	Chuck Wein	
2008	The Year of Getting to Know Us	Christopher Rocket	
2009	Whip It	Johnny Rocket	
2009	Arthur and the Revenge of Maltazard	Prince Betameche (voice)	
2010	Arthur 3: The War of the Two Worlds	Prince Betameche (voice)	
2011	Bucky Larson: Born to Be a Star	Himself	Uncredited cameo
2015	Get Hard	Himself	Uncredited cameo
2015	Ted 2	Himself	Uncredited cameo
2015	Jurassic World	Himself	Cameo
2015	Jem and the Holograms	Himself	Cameo
2015	Misery Loves Comedy	Himself	Documentary film
2016	Popstar: Never Stop Never Stopping	Himself	Cameo
2019	Dads	Himself	Documentary film
2020	The Stand In	Himself	Cameo
2022	Marry Me	Himself	Cameo
2022	Spirited	Himself	Cameo
2026	Lorne	Himself	Documentary film

=== Television ===
Year	Title	Role	Notes
1998–2004	Saturday Night Live	Himself / Various	120 episodes
1998	Spin City	Photographer	Episode: "The Marrying Men"
2001	Band of Brothers	2nd Lt. George C. Rice	Episode: "Crossroads"
2001	2001 MTV Movie Awards	Himself (host)	Television special
2002	2002 MTV Video Music Awards	Himself (host)	Television special
2003	Late Show with David Letterman	Himself (host)	Episode: "June 27, 2003"
2005	2005 MTV Movie Awards	Himself (host)	Television special
2009–2012	30 Rock	Himself / Young Jack	4 episodes
2009–2014	Late Night with Jimmy Fallon	Himself (host)	969 episodes; also writer
2009–2010	The Electric Company	Himself	8 episodes
2009–2020	Macy's Thanksgiving Day Parade	Himself (performer)	Alongside The Roots, 7 episodes
2009	Sesame Street	Wild Nature Survivor Guy	Episode: "Wild Nature Survivor Guy"
2009	Family Guy	Himself (voice)	Episode: "We Love You, Conrad"
2009	Gossip Girl	Himself	Episode: "The Grandfather: Part II"
2010	62nd Primetime Emmy Awards	Himself (host)	Television special
2010	Delocated	Himself	Episode: "Kim's Krafts"
2011–2017	Saturday Night Live	Himself (host)	3 episodes
2011	Silent Library	Himself	Episode: "Jimmy Fallon/The Roots"
2012	iCarly	Himself	Episode: "iShock America"
2012–2013	Guys with Kids	—N/a	17 episodes; also co-creator, writer, and executive producer
2014–present	The Tonight Show Starring Jimmy Fallon	Himself (host)	Also writer and producer
2015–2019	Lip Sync Battle	Himself	Episode: "Dwayne Johnson vs. Jimmy Fallon"; also executive producer
2015–2026	The Late Show with Stephen Colbert	Himself	6 episodes, including the series finale
2015	Louie	Himself	Episode: "A La Carte"
2015	The Spoils Before Dying	Detective Kenneth Bluntley	Episode: "The Trip Trap"
2015	The Jim Gaffigan Show	Himself	Episode: "My Friend the Priest"
2016	Maya & Marty	Todd	Episode: "Pilot"
2017	74th Golden Globe Awards	Himself (host)	Television special
2017	Saturday Night Live Weekend Update Thursday	George Washington	Episode: "4.2"
2019	The Boys	Himself	Episode: "The Name of the Game"
2021	Girls5eva	Himself	Episode: "Pilot"
2021	Only Murders in the Building	Himself	Episode: "To Protect and Serve"
2021	5 More Sleeps 'Til Christmas	Narrator	Television special
2022	Jimmy Kimmel Live!	Himself (guest host)	April Fools' Day
2026	Saturday Night Live UK	Himself	Episode: "Nicola Coughlan/Foo Fighters"

=== Video games ===
Year	Title	Voice role
2015	Lego Jurassic World	Himself
2018	The Jackbox Party Pack 5	Himself (in You Don't Know Jack: Full Stream)

=== Theatre ===
Year	Title	Role	Notes
2025	All In: Comedy About Love	Performer	Broadway

== Discography ==
=== Studio albums ===
List of studio albums, with selected chart positions
Title	Album details	Peaks	
Title	Album details	US	US Com.
The Bathroom Wall	Released: August 27, 2002; Label: DreamWorks; Formats: CD, vinyl, digital download	47	—
Blow Your Pants Off	Released: June 8, 2012; Label: Warner Bros.; Formats: CD, vinyl, digital download	25	1
Holiday Seasoning	Released: November 1, 2024; Label: Republic; Formats: CD, digital download	84	1
"—" denotes a recording that did not chart or was not released in that territory.

=== Singles ===
==== As lead artist ====
List of singles as lead artist, with selected chart positions
Title	Year	Peak chart positions					Album
Title	Year	US	US AC	US Hol. Dig.	US Rap	CAN	Album
"Idiot Boyfriend"	2002	—	—	—	—	—	The Bathroom Wall
"Car Wash for Peace"	2007	—	—	—	—	—	Non-album singles
"Drunk on Christmas" (solo or live version featuring John Rich)	2009	—	—	20	—	—	Non-album singles
"Ew!" (featuring will.i.am)	2014	26	—	—	5	14	Non-album singles
"It Was a... (Masked Christmas)" (featuring Ariana Grande and Megan Thee Stallion)	2021	—	—	37	—	—	Holiday Seasoning
"Almost Too Early for Christmas" (with Dolly Parton)	2022	—	30	32	—	—	Holiday Seasoning
"Wrap Me Up" (with Meghan Trainor)	2023	— (Note: "Wrap Me Up" did not enter the Billboard Hot 100, but peaked at number four on the Bubbling Under Hot 100 Singles chart.)	2	2	—	92	Holiday Seasoning
"Holiday" (with Jonas Brothers)	2024	—	1	—	—	—	Holiday Seasoning
"—" denotes a recording that did not chart or was not released in that territory.

==== As featured artist ====
List of singles as featured artist
Title	Year
"(Do It on My) Twin Bed" (Saturday Night Live cast featuring Jimmy Fallon)	2014

=== Other charted songs ===
List of other charted songs, with selected chart positions
Title	Year	Peak chart positions	Album
Title	Year	US Hol. Dig.	Album
"All I Want for Christmas Is You" (with Dolly Parton)	2020	4	A Holly Dolly Christmas

=== Guest appearances ===
List of non-single guest appearances, with other performing artists, showing year released and album name
Title	Year	Other artist(s)	Album
"You'll Be Back"	2016	The Roots	The Hamilton Mixtape
"Wonderful Christmastime"	2017	Paul McCartney, The Roots	Holidays Rule (Vol. 2)
"All I Want for Christmas Is You"	2020	Dolly Parton	A Holly Dolly Christmas

== Bibliography ==
- Fallon, Jimmy; Fallon, Gloria (1999). I Hate This Place: The Pessimist's Guide to Life. Warner Books. ISBN 978-0446692311.
- Fallon, Jimmy (2005). Snowball Fight!. Dutton Books for Young Readers. ISBN 978-0525474562.
- Fallon, Jimmy (2011). Thank You Notes. Grand Central Publishing. ISBN 978-0892967414.
- Fallon, Jimmy (2012). Thank You Notes 2. Grand Central Publishing. ISBN 978-0892967360.
- Fallon, Jimmy (2015). Your Baby's First Word Will Be DADA. Feiwel & Friends. ISBN 978-1250071811.
- Fallon, Jimmy (2017). Everything Is Mama. Feiwel & Friends. ISBN 978-1250125842.
- Fallon, Jimmy (2019). This Is Baby. Feiwel & Friends. ISBN 978-1250245601.
- Fallon, Jimmy (2020). 5 More Sleeps 'Til Christmas. Feiwel & Friends. ISBN 978-1250266477.
- Fallon, Jimmy (2022). Nana Loves You More. Feiwel & Friends. ISBN 978-1250823946.
- Fallon, Jimmy; Lopez, Jennifer (2022). Con Pollo: A Bilingual Playtime Adventure. Feiwel & Friends. ISBN 978-1250830418.
- Fallon, Jimmy (2024). 5 More Sleeps 'Til Halloween. Feiwel & Friends. ISBN 978-1250372703.
- Fallon, Jimmy (2025). Papa Doesn't Do Anything!. Feiwel & Friends. ISBN 978-1250393975.

== Awards and nominations ==
Year	Association	Category	Nominated work	Result	Ref.
2001	Teen Choice Awards	Choice TV: Personality	Saturday Night Live	Nominated	
2002	Teen Choice Awards	Choice TV: Personality	Saturday Night Live	Nominated	
2003	Grammy Awards	Best Comedy Album	The Bathroom Wall	Nominated	
2003	Teen Choice Awards	Choice TV: Personality	Saturday Night Live	Nominated	
2003	Teen Choice Awards	Choice Comedian	Saturday Night Live	Nominated	
2004	Teen Choice Awards	Choice Comedian	Saturday Night Live	Nominated	
2005	Teen Choice Awards	Choice Movie: Comedy Actor	Fever Pitch	Nominated	
2005	Teen Choice Awards	Choice Hissy Fit	Fever Pitch	Nominated	
2005	Teen Choice Awards	Choice Movie: Lip-lock	Fever Pitch	Nominated	
2005	Teen Choice Awards	Choice Movie: Chemistry	Fever Pitch	Nominated	
2005	Teen Choice Awards	Choice Movie: Rockstar Moment	Taxi	Nominated	
2009	Webby Awards	Lifetime Achievement Award		Won	
2009	Teen Choice Awards	Choice TV: Late Night Show	Late Night with Jimmy Fallon	Nominated	
2009	Primetime Emmy Awards	Outstanding Creative Achievement in Interactive Media – Nonfiction	Late Night with Jimmy Fallon	Won	
2010	Teen Choice Awards	Choice Comedian	Late Night with Jimmy Fallon	Nominated	
2010	Primetime Emmy Awards	Outstanding Creative Achievement in Interactive Media – Nonfiction	Late Night with Jimmy Fallon	Won	
2011	People's Choice Awards	Favorite Online Sensation	Late Night with Jimmy Fallon	Nominated	
2011	The Comedy Awards	Late Night Comedy Series	Late Night with Jimmy Fallon	Nominated	
2011	Teen Choice Awards	Choice Comedian	Late Night with Jimmy Fallon	Nominated	
2011	Primetime Emmy Awards	Outstanding Variety Series	Late Night with Jimmy Fallon	Nominated	
2011	Primetime Emmy Awards	Outstanding Creative Achievement in Interactive Media	Late Night with Jimmy Fallon	Nominated	
2011	Primetime Emmy Awards	Outstanding Writing for a Variety Series	Late Night with Jimmy Fallon	Nominated	
2012	People's Choice Awards	Favorite Late Night TV Host	Late Night with Jimmy Fallon	Won	
2012	Writers Guild of America	Comedy/Variety (including talk) series	Late Night with Jimmy Fallon	Nominated	
2012	The Comedy Awards	Late Night Comedy Series	Late Night with Jimmy Fallon	Nominated	
2012	Critics' Choice Television Awards	Best Talk Show	Late Night with Jimmy Fallon	Won	
2012	Teen Choice Awards	Choice Comedian	Late Night with Jimmy Fallon	Nominated	
2012	Primetime Emmy Awards	Outstanding Variety Series	Late Night with Jimmy Fallon	Nominated	
2012	Primetime Emmy Awards	Outstanding Guest Actor in a Comedy Series	Saturday Night Live	Won	
2013	People's Choice Awards	Favorite Late Night TV Host	Late Night with Jimmy Fallon	Won	
2013	Grammy Awards	Best Comedy Album	Blow Your Pants Off	Won	
2013	Critics' Choice Television Awards	Best Talk Show	Late Night with Jimmy Fallon	Nominated	
2013	Teen Choice Awards	Choice Comedian	Late Night with Jimmy Fallon	Nominated	
2013	Primetime Emmy Awards	Outstanding Variety Series	Late Night with Jimmy Fallon	Nominated	
2014	People's Choice Awards	Favorite Late Night TV Host	Late Night with Jimmy Fallon	Nominated	
2014	American Comedy Awards	Best Late Night Talk Show	Late Night with Jimmy Fallon	Nominated	
2014	Critics' Choice Television Awards	Best Talk Show	The Tonight Show Starring Jimmy Fallon	Nominated	
2014	Teen Choice Awards	Choice Comedian	The Tonight Show Starring Jimmy Fallon	Nominated	
2014	Primetime Emmy Awards	Outstanding Variety Series	The Tonight Show Starring Jimmy Fallon	Nominated	
2014	Primetime Emmy Awards	Outstanding Writing for a Variety Series	The Tonight Show Starring Jimmy Fallon	Nominated	
2014	Primetime Emmy Awards	Outstanding Interactive Program	The Tonight Show Starring Jimmy Fallon	Won	
2014	Primetime Emmy Awards	Outstanding Variety Special	Best of Late Night with Jimmy Fallon Primetime Special	Nominated	
2014	Primetime Emmy Awards	Outstanding Guest Actor in a Comedy Series	Saturday Night Live	Won	
2015	People's Choice Awards	Favorite Late Night TV Host	The Tonight Show Starring Jimmy Fallon	Won	
2015	Critics' Choice Television Awards	Best Talk Show	The Tonight Show Starring Jimmy Fallon	Nominated	
2015	Primetime Emmy Awards	Outstanding Variety Talk Series	The Tonight Show Starring Jimmy Fallon	Nominated	
2015	Primetime Emmy Awards	Outstanding Creative Achievement in Interactive Media — Social TV Experience	The Tonight Show Starring Jimmy Fallon	Won	
2015	Primetime Emmy Awards	Outstanding Interactive Program	The Tonight Show Starring Jimmy Fallon	Nominated	
2015	Teen Choice Awards	Choice Comedian	The Tonight Show Starring Jimmy Fallon	Nominated	
2015	Teen Choice Awards	Choice Social Media King	The Tonight Show Starring Jimmy Fallon	Nominated	
2016	People's Choice Awards	Favorite Late Night Talk Show Host	The Tonight Show Starring Jimmy Fallon	Won	
2016	Critics' Choice Television Awards	Best Talk Show	The Tonight Show Starring Jimmy Fallon	Nominated	
2016	Critics' Choice Television Awards	Best Talk Show	The Tonight Show Starring Jimmy Fallon	Nominated	
2016	Writers Guild of America	Comedy/Variety – Talk Series	The Tonight Show Starring Jimmy Fallon	Nominated	
2016	Teen Choice Awards	Choice Comedian	The Tonight Show Starring Jimmy Fallon	Nominated	
2016	Primetime Emmy Awards	Outstanding Variety Talk Series	The Tonight Show Starring Jimmy Fallon	Nominated	
2017	People's Choice Awards	Favorite Late Night Talk Show Host	The Tonight Show Starring Jimmy Fallon	Won	
2017	Teen Choice Awards	Choice TV Personality	The Tonight Show Starring Jimmy Fallon	Nominated	
2017	Primetime Emmy Awards	Outstanding Interactive Program	The Tonight Show Starring Jimmy Fallon	Nominated	
2018	Teen Choice Awards	Choice Comedian	The Tonight Show Starring Jimmy Fallon	Nominated	
2018	Primetime Emmy Awards	Outstanding Short Form Variety Series	The Tonight Show Starring Jimmy Fallon – Cover Room	Nominated	
2018	People's Choice Award	The Nighttime Talk Show of 2018	The Tonight Show Starring Jimmy Fallon	Won	
2019	Primetime Emmy Awards	Outstanding Actor in a Short Form Comedy or Drama Series	Beto Breaks the Internet	Nominated	
2019	People's Choice Award	The Nighttime Talk Show of 2019	The Tonight Show Starring Jimmy Fallon	Won	
2020	People's Choice Award	The Nighttime Talk Show of 2020	The Tonight Show Starring Jimmy Fallon	Won	
2023	Webby Awards	Best Web Personality/Host, Performances & Craft	The Tonight Show Starring Jimmy Fallon		
2023	Webby Awards	Variety, Video Series & Channels	The Tonight Show Starring Jimmy Fallon		
2025	Primetime Emmy Awards	Primetime Emmy Award for Outstanding Variety Special (Live)	SNL50: The Homecoming Concert	Nominated	

== See also ==
- New Yorkers in journalism
- Political satire
