= Born Cages =

US musical group

- Origin: New York City, New York, U.S.
- Genres: Indie rock, alternative rock
- Years active: 2011-2017
- Past members: Vlad Holiday; Matt Maroulakos; Dave Tantao; Amanda Carl; Steve Kellner; Pete Malleo; Mike Lisa
- Website: www.borncages.com

Born Cages was a New York City-based indie rock band formed in 2011. In January 2018, the band officially announced it had split after 6 years of touring and recording. Past members include Vlad Holiday, Matt Maroulakos, Dave Tantao, Amanda Carl, Steve Kellner, Pete Malleo, and Mike Lisa. The band released their final mini-album/EP Exit Signs in a Burning Building around SXSW Music Festival in March 2017, where NPR raved, "Undeniably great songs... Every moment was Instagram-ready, and every song made me want to throw my hands in the air... I look forward to saying, 'I saw them when...'" The album contained the lead single "Ain't Gonna Happen", which charted on Spotify's United States Viral 50.

Born Cages shared stages with bands like Guns N' Roses, The Subways, Hockey, Magic Man, X Ambassadors, Donald Cumming (of The Virgins), Har Mar Superstar, JD Samson, Said The Whale, and Public Access TV. On February 19 and 23 of 2012, the band was hand-picked to open for Guns N' Roses in Chicago and Maryland.

== Formation ==
In October 2011, the band began booking shows in New York City under the moniker Electric Sun. The band's first live show was at Music Hall of Williamsburg on October 26, 2011. In October 2012, they changed their name to "Born Cages" due to too many people confusing them for a 1970s rock band that shared the same name, fronted by The Scorpions' Uli Jon Roth. The band's first show as Born Cages was at the CMJ Music Festival with X Ambassadors. Vlad Holiday remained the only original member from the Electric Sun days.

== Discography ==
=== The Sidelines EP (2011–2013) ===
Born Cages released The Sidelines EP on June 18, 2013, which was produced by Jon Kaplan, co-produced by Vlad Holiday, and engineered by Oliver Straus. The EP featured three songs from the upcoming full-length album, and 2 exclusive tracks.

Filter Magazine said The Sidelines EP "beautifully straddles the line between dreamy and discordant … a standout 17 minutes", and declared it "spellbinding." Vice Noisey described the music as a "blend of '80s-influenced synth/guitar work and modern pop-rock sounds" and Blackbook Magazine said, "More than a decade after the riff-heavy heyday of the Strokes, the Vines, the White Stripes, the Hives, and many other bands that put the word “the” before a plural noun, we may be ready for another bout of ripping revivalism… Born Cages certainly makes that argument." Artist Direct said, "The New York indie band totally rocks our world with their brand of ‘80s-style, synthy rock." Alternative Press wrote, "Don't Look Back - a soaring rocker that you'll have no problem dancing to assuming you can put down the air guitar for four minutes."

The album debuted at No. 3 on the Billboard 200 albums chart with first week sales of 87,000 units. In December 2014, the album was certified gold, having sold over half a million units. The song was also featured several times on New York classic rock station Q104.3's "Out of the Box" segment with Jonathan Clarke.

In conjunction with the EP, a video for the song "Caiti" was released on June 19, 2013 on VEVO/YouTube, and on July 8, 2013 on MTV.com. On February 13, 2014, Filter Magazine premiered the official music video for "Don't Look Back".

=== I'm Glad I'm Not Me (2014–2016) ===
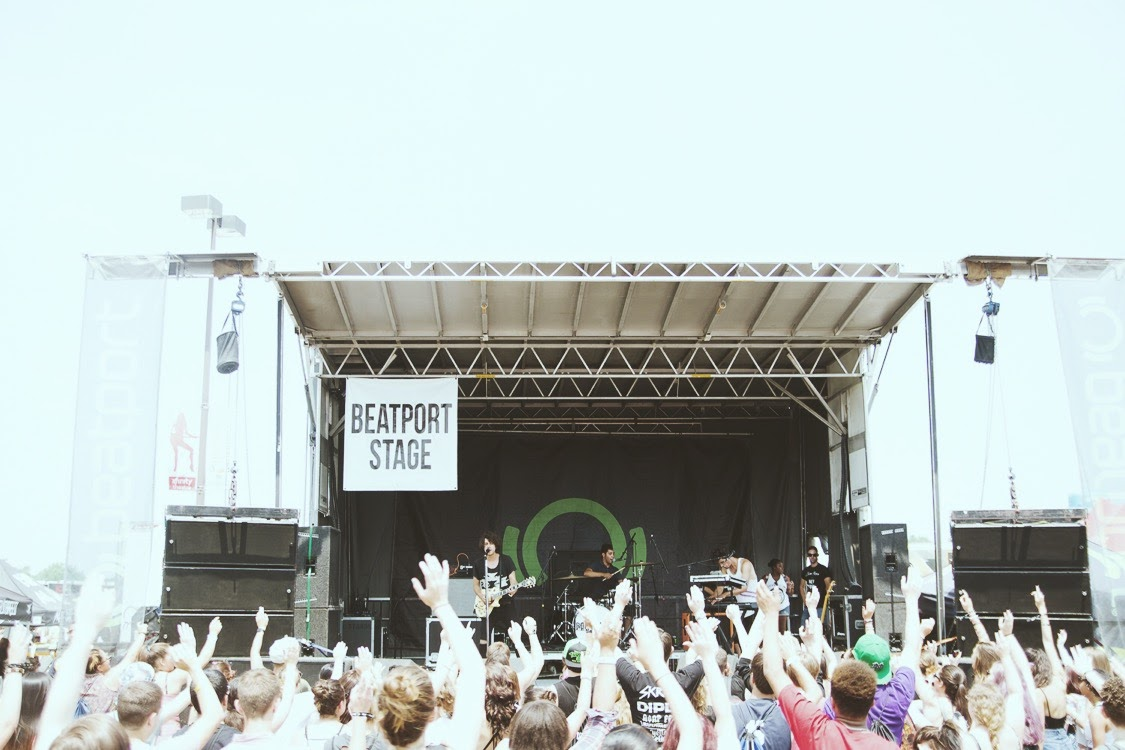
Photo by Nicole Mago

Born Cages' debut full-length album, I'm Glad I'm Not Me, was released via Washington Square on June 2, 2015. The album artwork was created by London-based illustrator Matthew Cooper, who has worked with Arctic Monkeys, the Kills, Caribou, Franz Ferdinand, Noel Gallagher and Paul McCartney. Due to "Rolling Down the Hill" and "Metaphor"'s radio play, I'm Glad I'm Not Me became the No. 9 album on Alternative Specialty radio during the week of December 10, 2014.

On August 5, 2014, Buzznet premiered Born Cages' "Rolling Down the Hill" as the band announced a headlining tour in support of the new single. On September 4, Fresh New Tracks premiered a "Rolling Down the Hill" remix from German producer Glastrophobie, which reached the No. 2 spot on Hype Machine's Popular Remix Chart. Yahoo! Music premiered the song's official music video on November 1, 2014. On November 21, 2014, the video won mtvU's The Freshmen competition. On the week of November 19, 2014, "Rolling Down the Hill" reached No. 7 on the Alternative Specialty Radio chart, with spins on stations like LA's KROQ and NYC's Q104.3. The single also featured the B-side track "Fuel to the Fire", which was an old demo from the band's first studio recording.

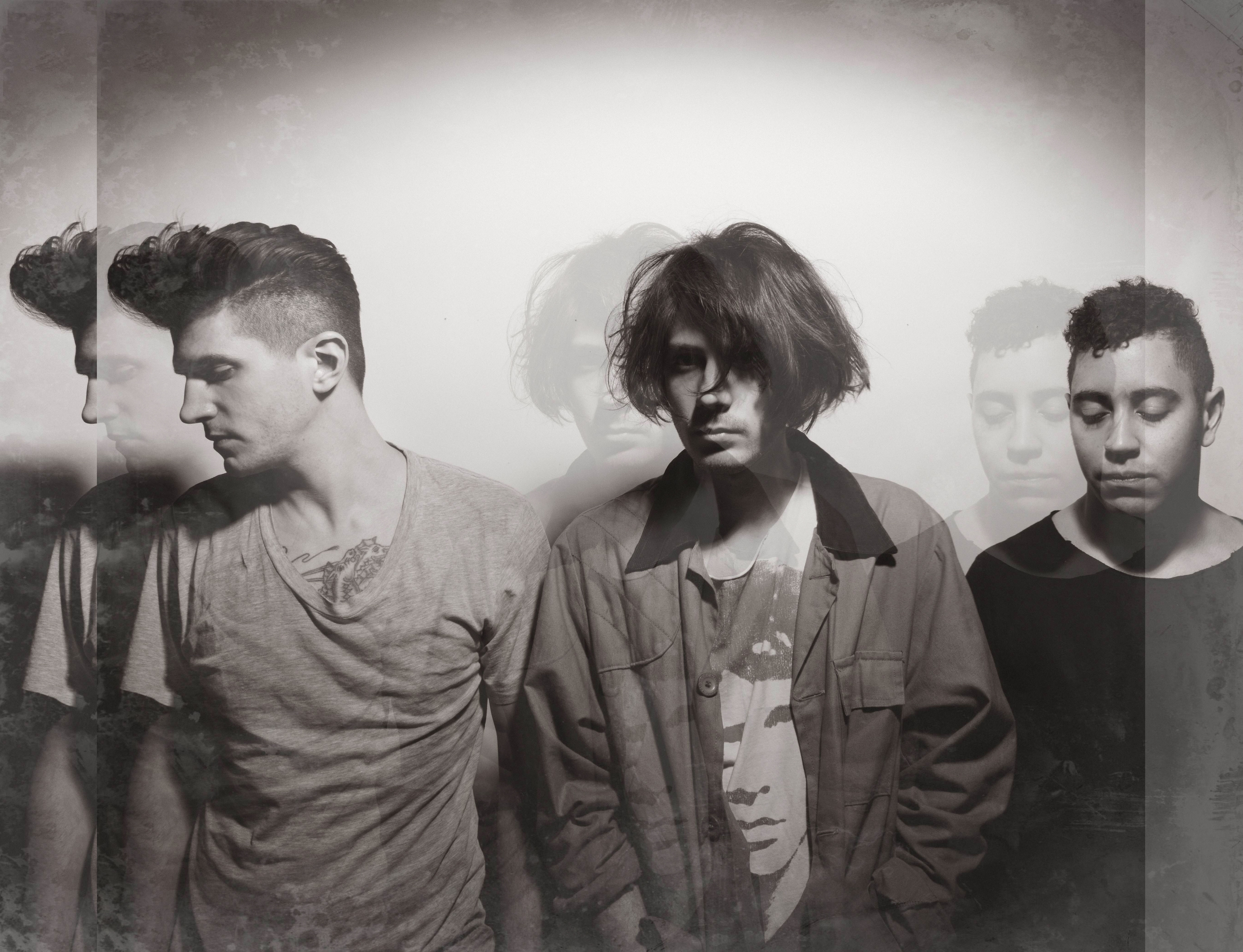
Photo by Nicole Mago

On April 7, 2015, Diffuser FM premiered "I Just Want the Truth, Baby", the second single from I'm Glad I'm Not Me, as an "instant gratification" track on iTunes. The song was featured on MTV's Catfish: The TV Show, along with indie film No Pay, Nudity, featuring Gabriel Byrne and Nathan Lane.

=== Exit Signs in a Burning Building (2017-final days) ===
On April 7, 2017, Born Cages put out their latest release, Exit Signs in a Burning Building. The release is a 7-song mini-album, produced by Vlad Holiday, mixed by Justin Gerrish (Vampire Weekend, the Strokes, Hamilton Leithouser), mastered by Emily Lazar (Arcade Fire, the Killers, Lou Reed), with additional production and engineering by Matt Maroulakos. In an interview, Holiday addressed the band's nearly year-long hiatus while writing the new album, saying that, "There wasn’t a specific process to writing this record other than, write when you wanna write. I don’t like music that feels forced, and sometimes that inevitably happens with a band’s second release, when you don’t want to be in the shadows for too long. But we took the shadows head on, because life’s too short to write shitty songs."

The first song released was "Ain't Gonna Happen" on December 6, 2016, which reached No. 42 on Spotify's United States Viral 50 Chart on January 9. On February 7, 2017, the band premiered their second single "Half Asleep" on Pancakes & Whiskey along with more details on the album release. The official music video for "Half Asleep" was premiered on March 8 on VEVO. Born Cages performed songs from the new album at the SXSW Music Festival in March 2017, where NPR raved, "Undeniably great songs... every moment was Instagram-ready, and every song made me want to throw my hands in the air... I look forward to saying, 'I saw them when...'" Born Cages also performed new music for Daytrotter and Paste Magazine's SXSW studio sessions.

The band's final show was a sold out night with the band X Ambassadors at Toronto's legendary Horseshoe Tavern.
