= Air Stereo =

Studio album by The Damnwells
- Released: August 15, 2006
- Genre: Alternative rock
- Length: 62:38
- Label: Epic/Rounder Records
- Producers: Jon Kaplan, Wes Kidd

Professional ratings
Review scores
Source	Rating
AllMusic	3.5/5 stars
Absolutepunk.net	(93%)
IGN	(8.9/10)

Air Stereo is The Damnwells' second full-length album, released on August 15, 2006.

== Track listing ==
All songs written by Alex Dezen.

1. "I've Got You" – 3:32
2. "Accidental Man" – 4:29
3. "You Don't Have to Like Me to Love Me (Tonight)" – 3:47
4. "Golden Days" – 4:19
5. "Louisville" – 4:33
6. "Sell the Lie" – 3:34
7. "Shiny Bruise" – 5:05
8. "Heartbreaklist" – 3:55
9. "Kung Fu Grip Kiss" – 4:29
10. "I am a Leaver" – 4:59
11. "Graceless" – 4:40
12. "Keep a Little Organ" – 5:07
13. "God Bless America" – 10:09
14. "Air Stereo" (Bonus Track) – 4:18

== Personnel ==
- Alex Dezen - lead vocals, guitar, piano
- David Chernis - lead guitar
- Ted Hudson - bass
- Steven Terry - drums/percussion)
