= 50 and Not Pregnant =

Live album by Kathy Griffin
- Released: July 18, 2011
- Recorded: March 17, 2011
- Genre: Comedy
- Length: 43:17
- Label: Universal Network Television LLC
- Producer: Kathy Griffin

Kathy Griffin chronology
Whores on Crutches (2010)	50 and Not Pregnant (2011)	Gurrl Down (2011)

50 and Not Pregnant is the fourth album and eleventh Bravo stand-up comedy special by stand-up comedian Kathy Griffin and thirteenth overall. It was televised live from the Riverside Theatre in Milwaukee, Wisconsin on March 17, 2011 on Bravo. It was also re-released on October 30, 2012, as part of The Kathy Griffin Collection: Red, White & Raw.

== Track listing ==
No.	Title	Length
1.	"Introduction"	2:25
2.	"Losing the Grammies"	4:40
3.	"Whitney Houston"	2:55
4.	"Sex advice shows"	3:25
5.	"Quentin Tarantino's roast"	5:25
6.	"Justin Bieber's Never Say Never"	3:35
7.	"Steven Seagal: Lawman"	4:35
8.	"Maggie Griffin reads from Twitter"	1:25
9.	"Reading Maggie Griffin's emails"	6:30
10.	"Sarah Palin"	4:05
11.	"Performing Does the Bible Belt and hate mail"	4:17
Total length:		43:17

== Personnel ==
Technical and production

- Andy Cohen - executive producer
- Kathy Griffin - executive producer
- Jenn Levy - executive producer
- Paul Miller - executive producer
- Kimber Rickabaugh - executive producer
- Jeff U'ren - film editor
- Bruce Ryan - production designer
- Cisco Henson - executive in charge of production
- Lesley Maynard - production supervisor
- Gene Crowe - associate director, stage manager
- Dave Bell - production assistant
- Joe Cacciatore - production assistant
- James Lovewell - production assistant
- Bridget Morris - production assistant
- Mike White - production assistant

Visuals and imagery

- Ashlee Mullen - hair stylist / make-up artist
- Simon Miles - lighting designer

== Award and nominations ==
The live Bravo performance special was nominated for the Grammy for Best Comedy Album in the 54th Grammy Awards.
