= Grammy Award for Best Comedy Album =

Award for comedy albums

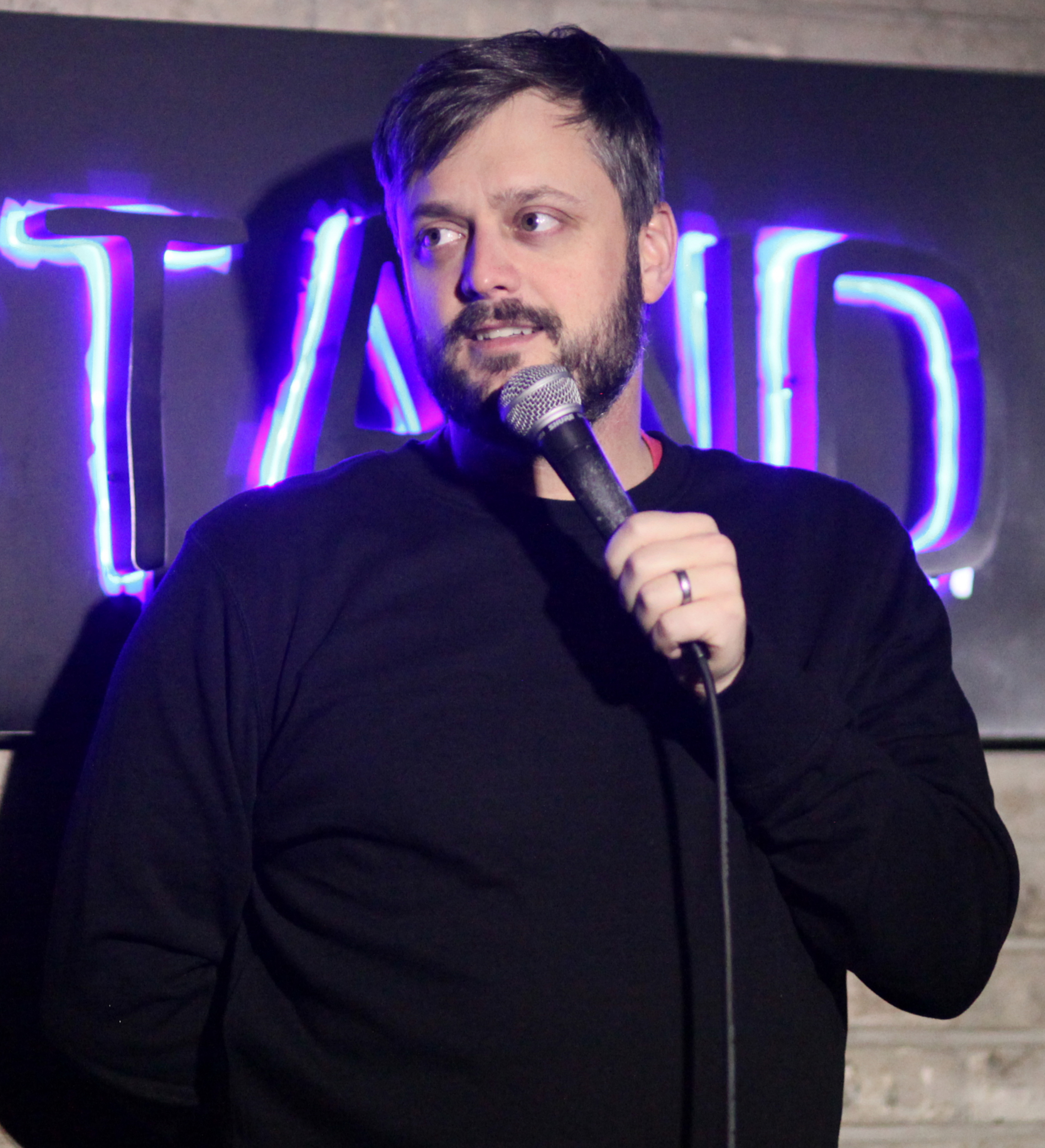
- Your Friend, Nate Bargatze by Nate Bargatze is the most recent recipient
- Awarded for: Quality comedy albums
- Country: United States
- Presented by: National Academy of Recording Arts and Sciences
- First award: 1959
- Currently held by: Nate Bargatze – Your Friend, Nate Bargatze (2026)
- Website: grammy.com

The Grammy Award for Best Comedy Album is presented by the National Academy of Recording Arts and Sciences of the United States to "honor artistic achievement in comedy." The award was awarded yearly from 1959 to 1993 and then from 2004 to present day.

== History ==
There have been several minor changes to the name of the award over this time:

- From 1959 to 1967 it was Best Comedy Performance
- From 1968 to 1991 it was known as Best Comedy Recording
- From 1992 to 1993 and from 2004 to the present day it was awarded as Best Comedy Album

In 1960 and 1961 two separate awards were presented for the best spoken and for the best musical comedy performance.

In 1994, after four consecutive years of wins by classical music comedy albums, the award was restricted to spoken word comedy albums and moved into the "spoken" field. From then through 2003, it was awarded as the Grammy Award for Best Spoken Comedy Album.

In 2004 the award was reinstated within the comedy field as the Grammy Award for Best Comedy Album, once again allowing musical comedy works to be considered.

Bill Cosby holds the record for most consecutive wins, with six earned between 1965 and 1970. Peter Schickele (of P.D.Q. Bach fame) is the runner-up, with four wins between 1990 and 1993.

== Recipients ==
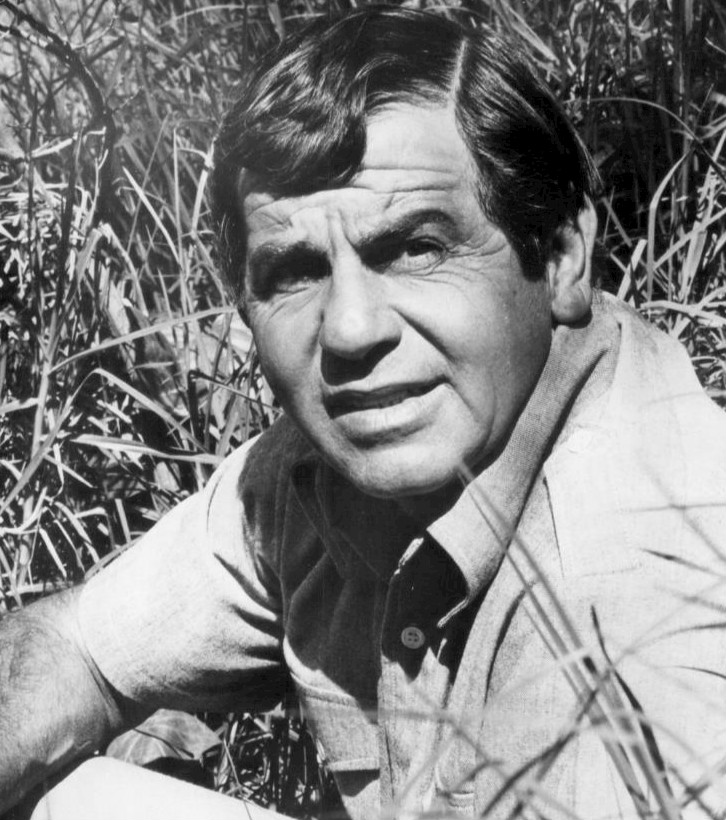
Ross Bagdasarian Sr. was the first recipient of the award for "The Chipmunk Song (Christmas Don't Be Late)" (1959).

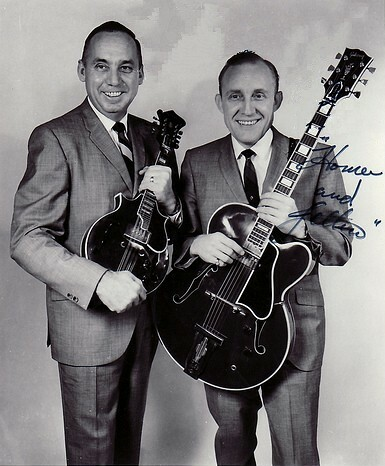
Homer and Jethro won in 1960

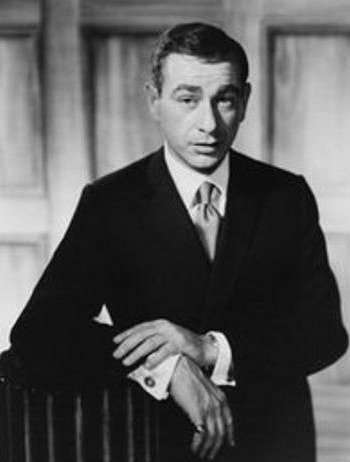
Shelley Berman won in 1960

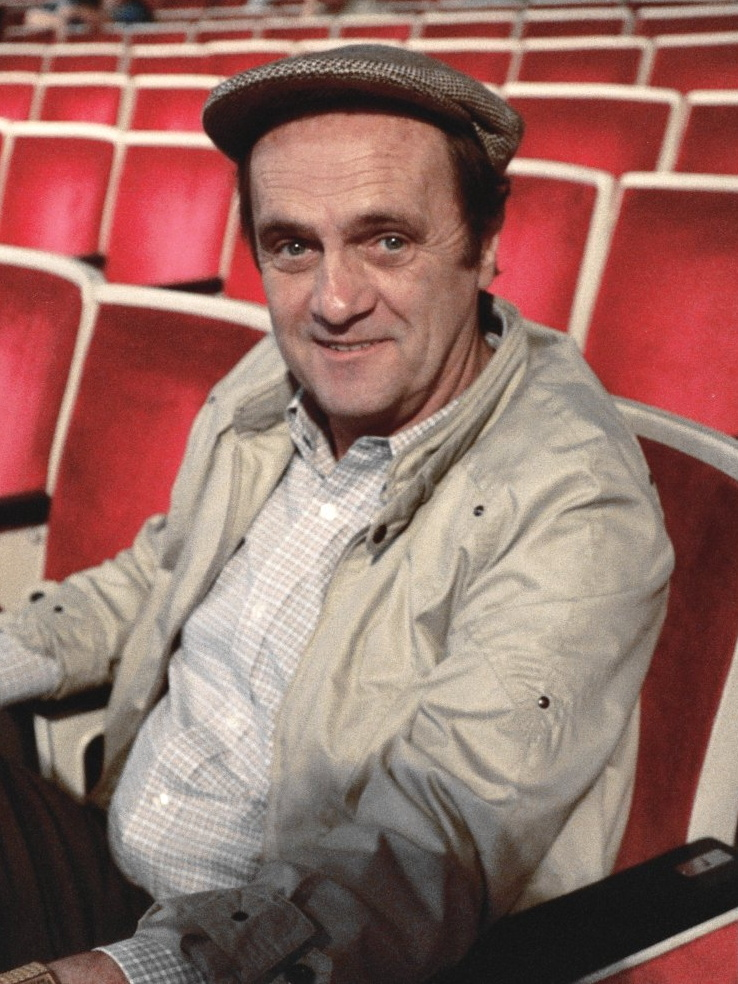
Bob Newhart won for The Button-Down Mind Strikes Back! in 1961

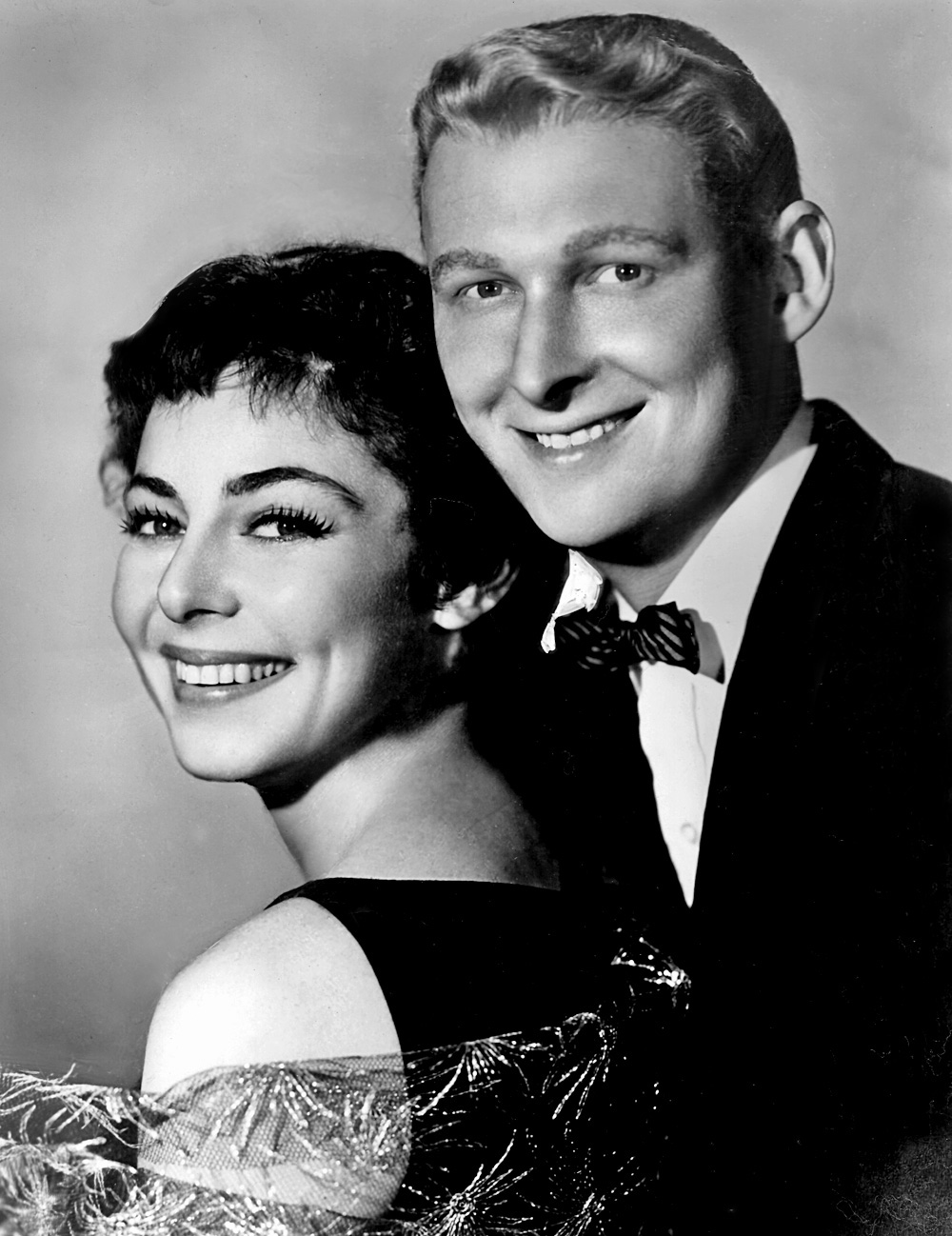
Elaine May & Mike Nichols won in 1962

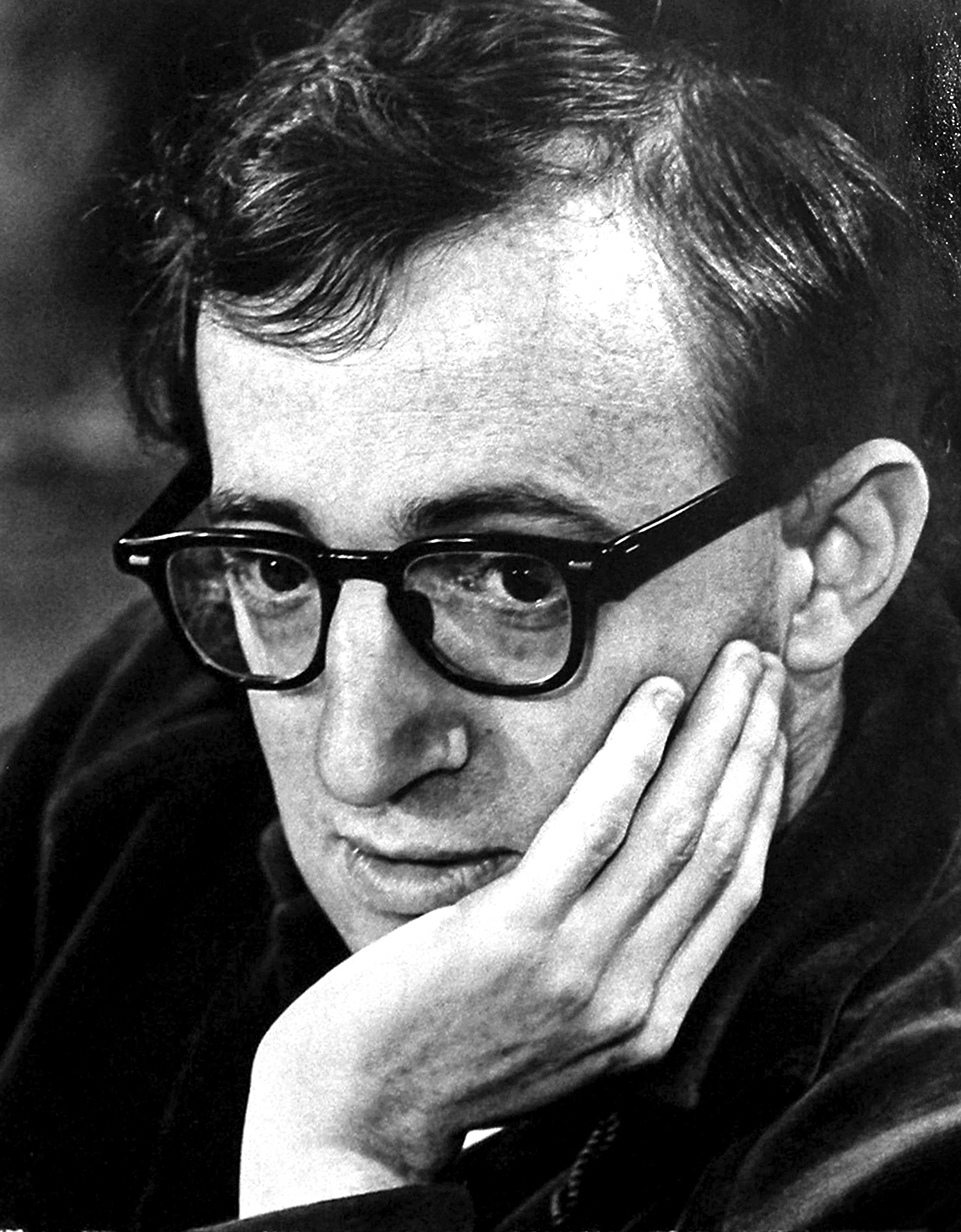
Woody Allen was nominated for his self-titled album in 1965.

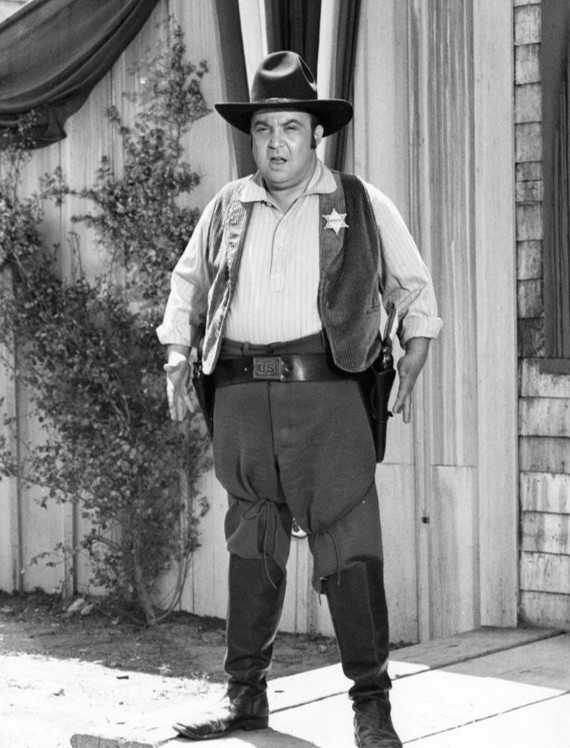
Allen Sherman won for "Hello Muddah, Hello Fadduh (A Letter from Camp)" in 1964.

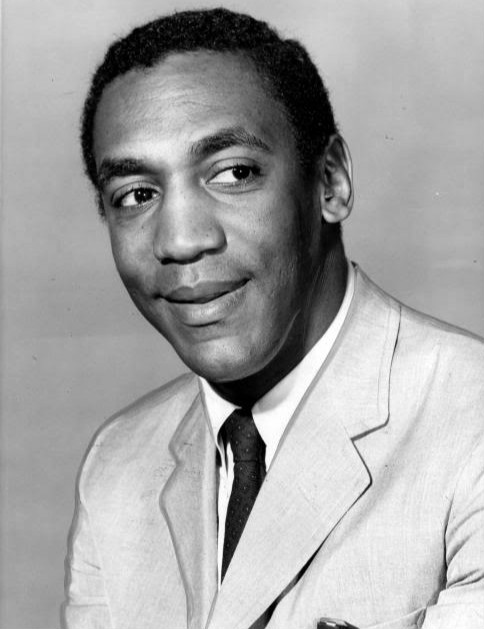
Bill Cosby holds the record of most wins in the category with seven, six of them being consecutive from 1965 to 1970.

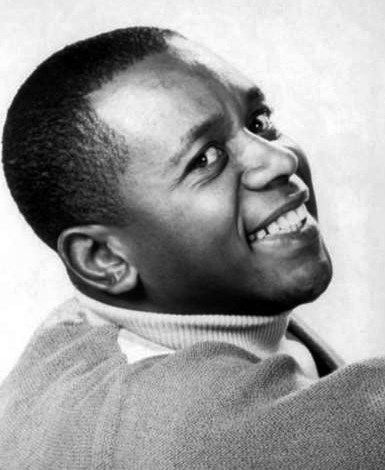
Flip Wilson won for The Devil Made Me Buy This Dress in 1971

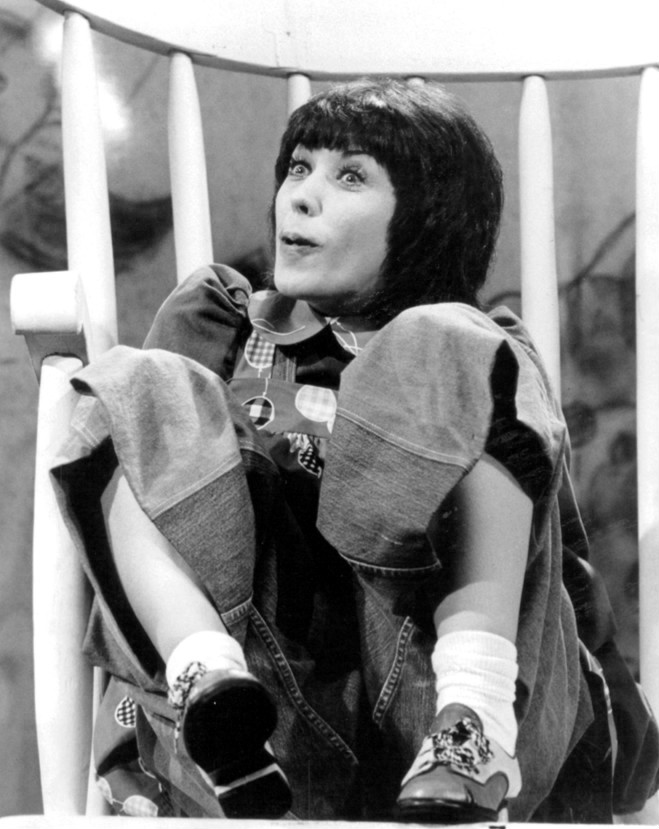
Lily Tomlin won for This Is a Recording in 1972

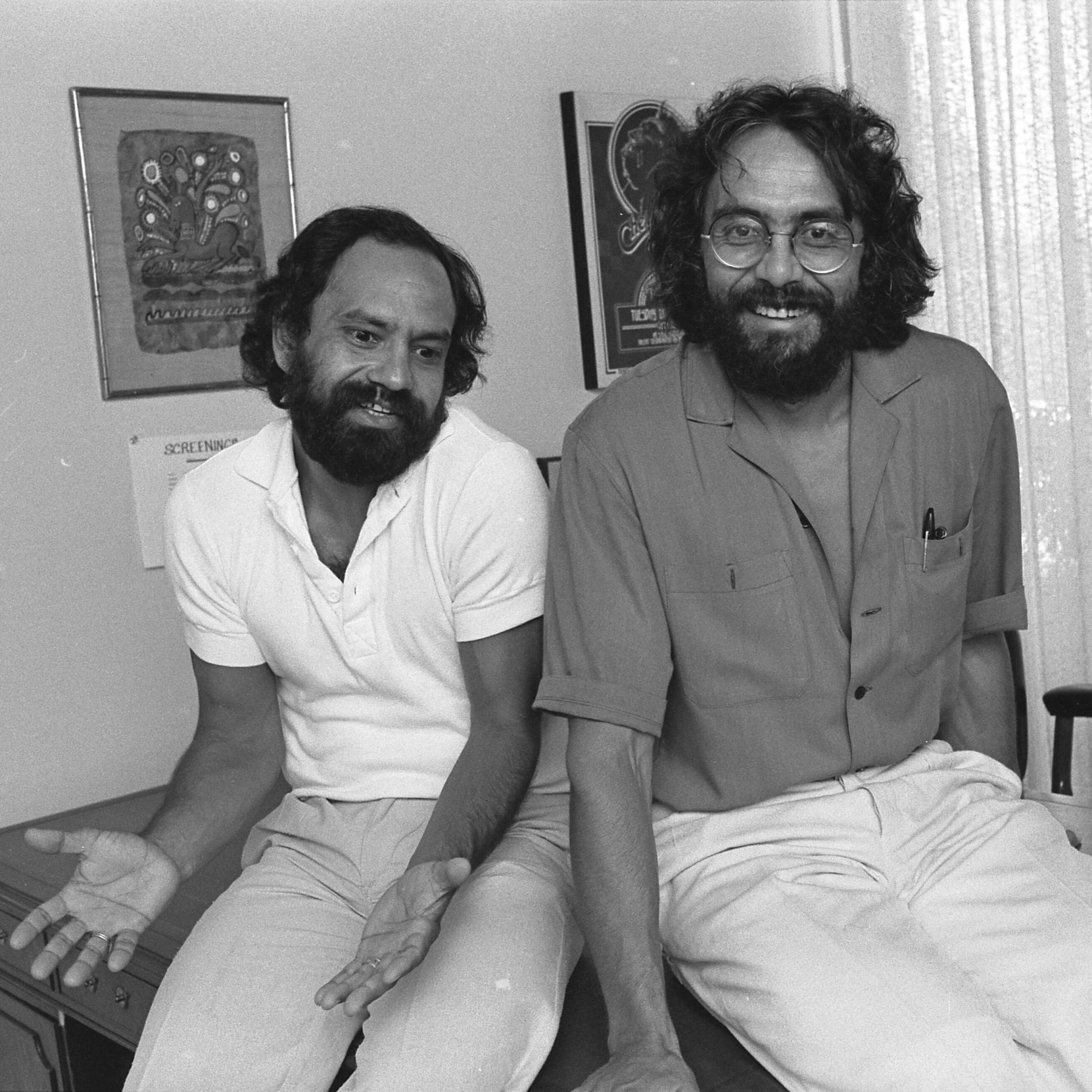
Cheech and Chong won for Los Cochinos in 1974

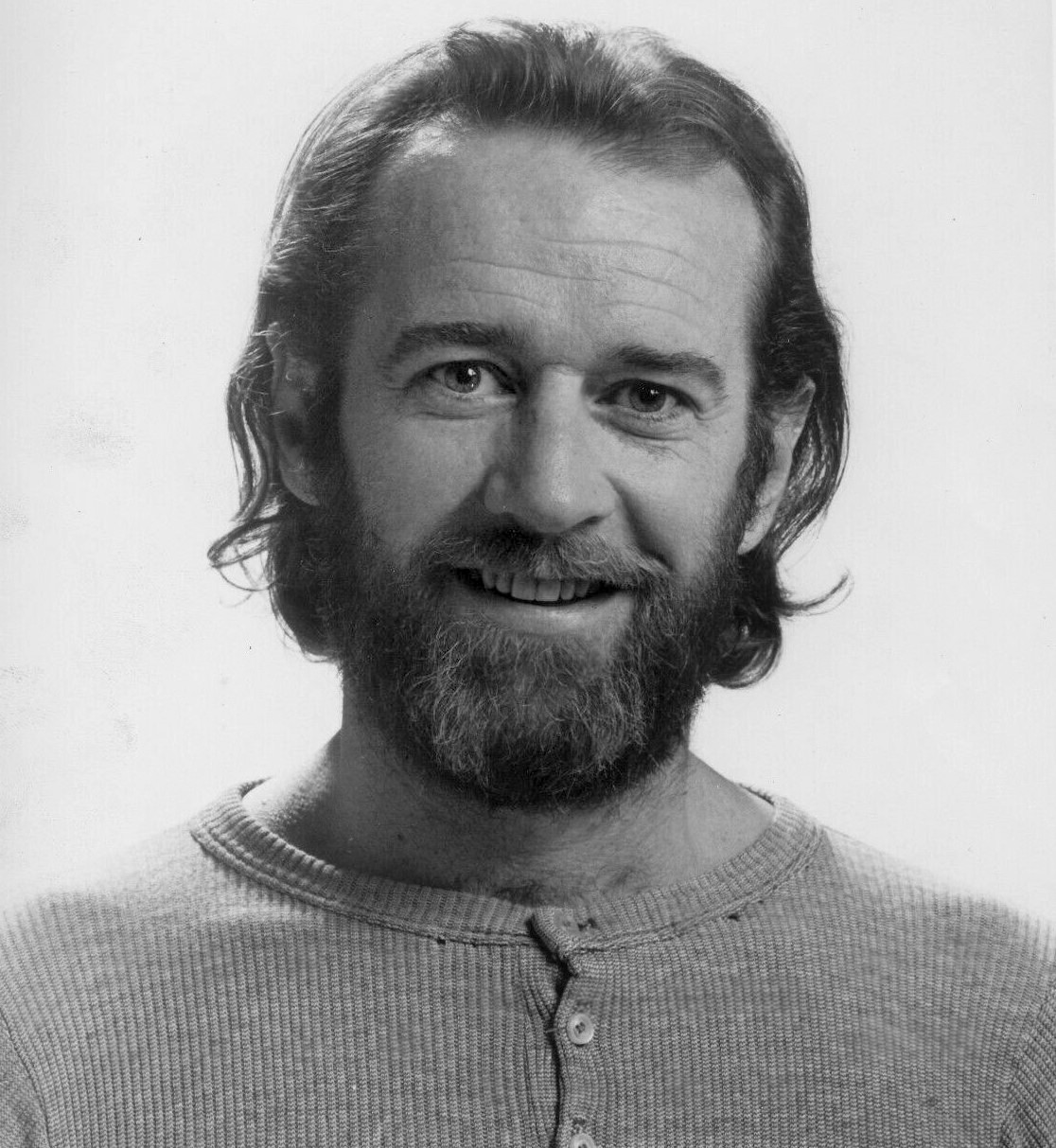
16-time nominee George Carlin won five times for FM & AM (1973), Jammin' in New York (1994), Brain Droppings (2001), Napalm and Silly Putty (2002), and It's Bad for Ya (2009), the last of which was posthumous.

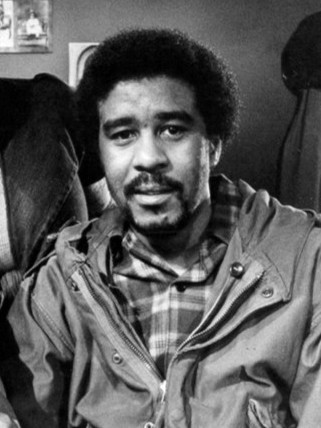
10-time nominee Richard Pryor won five times for That Nigger's Crazy (1975), ...Is It Something I Said? (1976), Bicentennial Nigger (1977), Rev. Du Rite (1982), and Live on the Sunset Strip (1983).

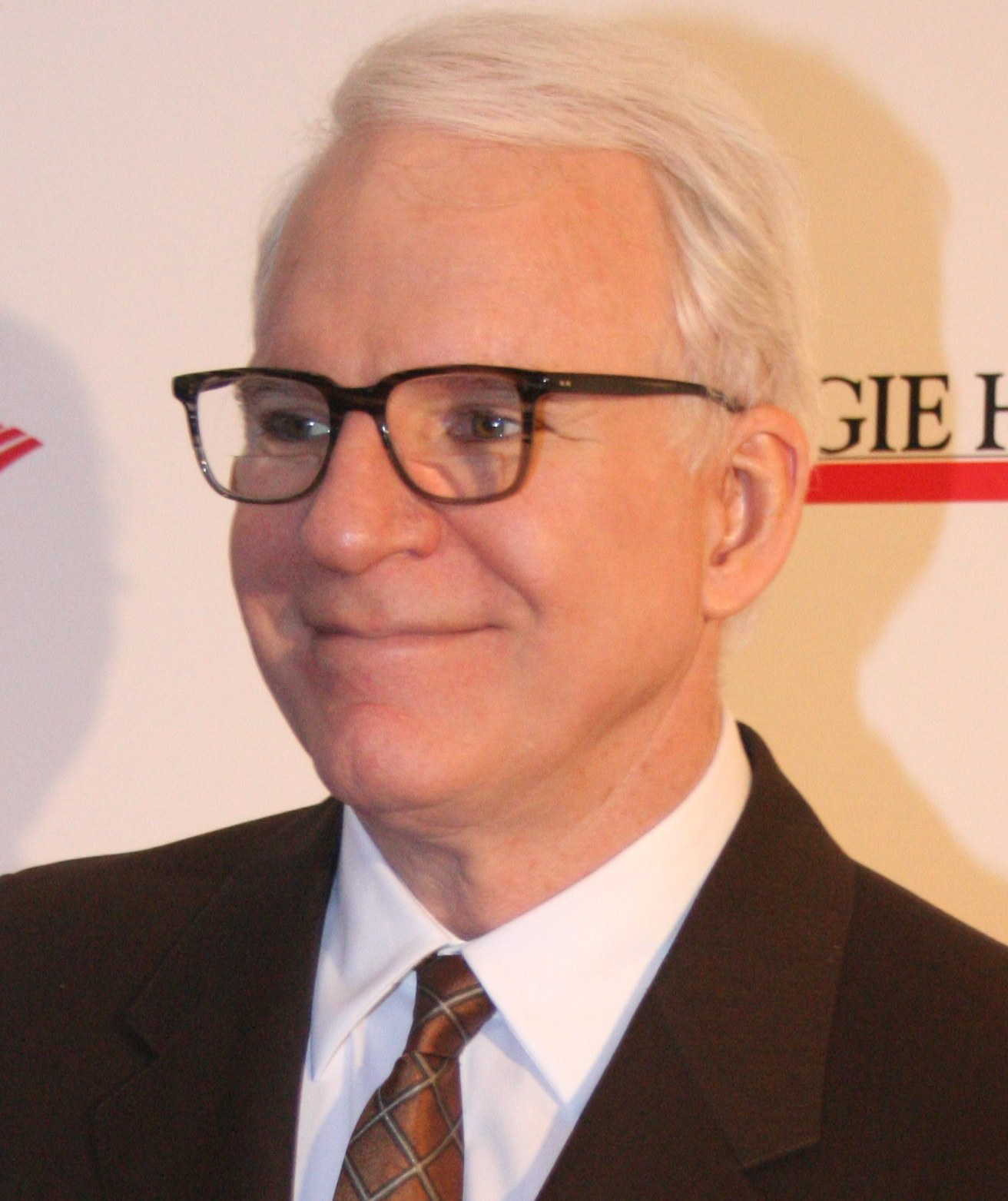
5-time nominee Steve Martin won twice for Let's Get Small (1978) and A Wild and Crazy Guy (1979).

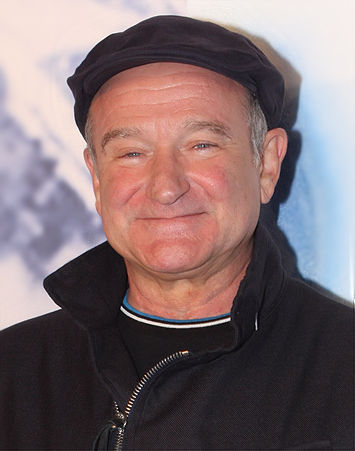
6-time nominee Robin Williams won four times for Reality...What a Concept (1980), A Night at the Met (1988), Good Morning, Vietnam (1989), and Live on Broadway (2003).

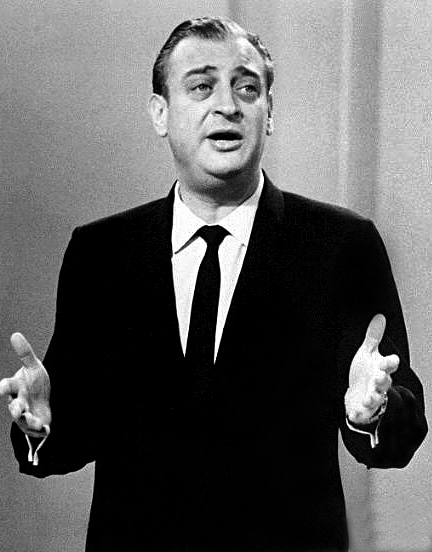
Three-time nominee Rodney Dangerfield won for No Respect in 1980

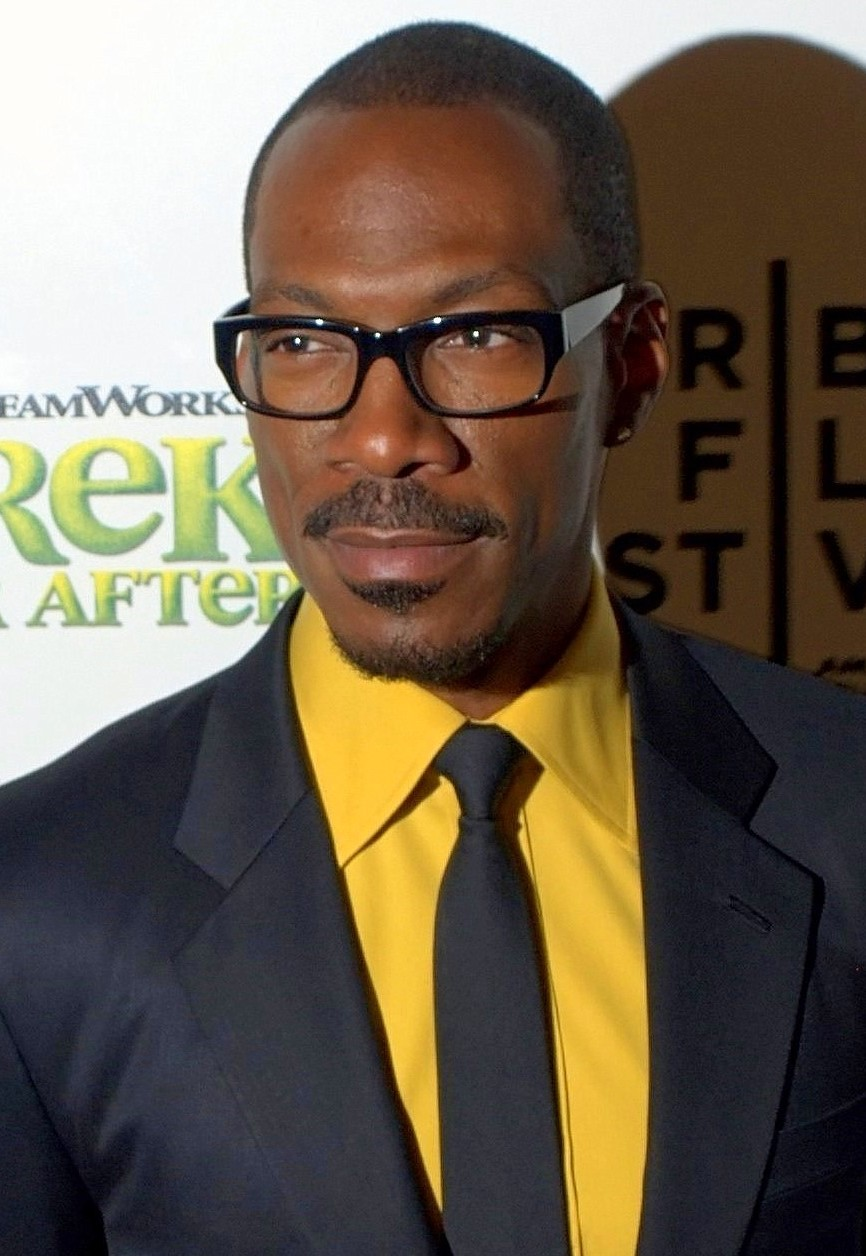
Eddie Murphy won for Comedian in 1984.

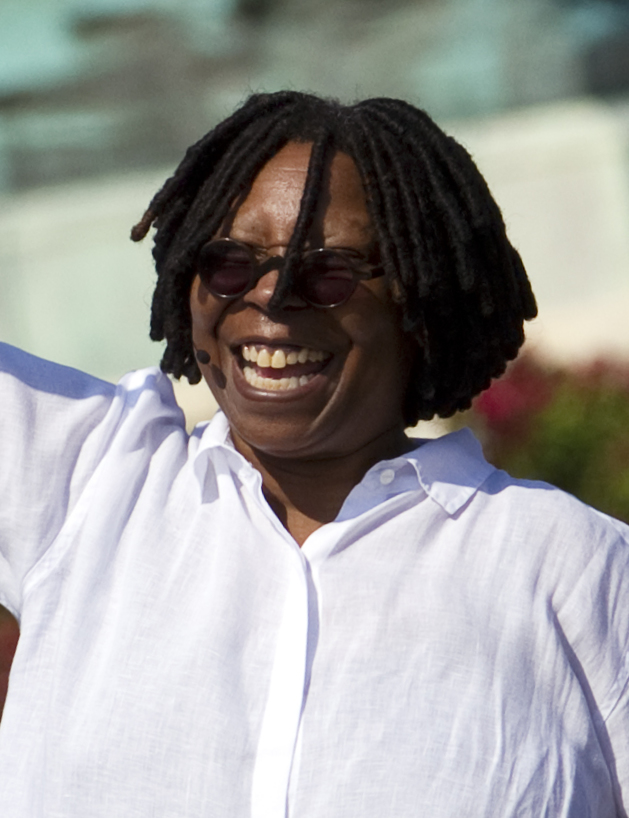
Whoopi Goldberg won for Whoopi: Original Broadway Show Recording in 1986.

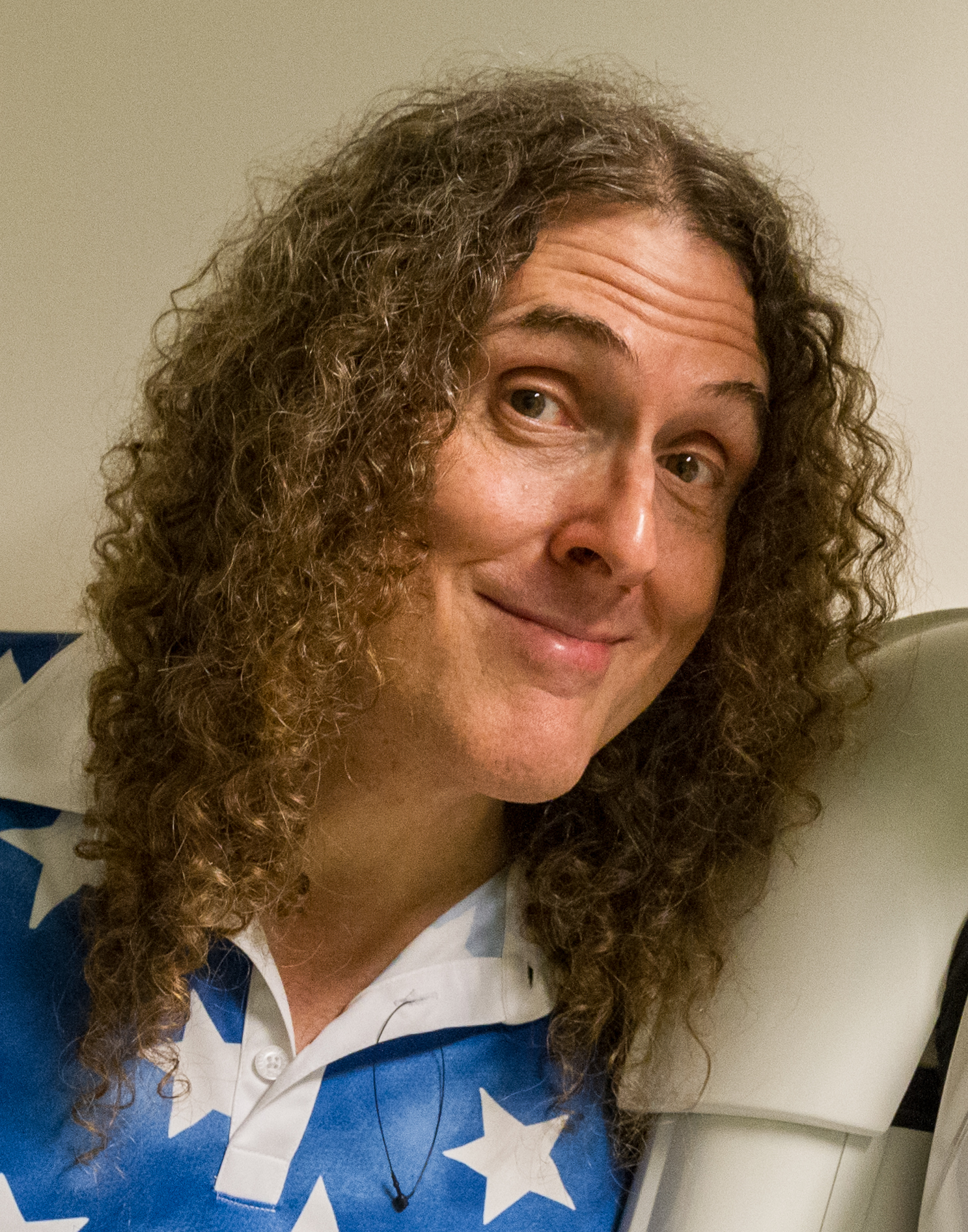
Three-time winner "Weird Al" Yankovic won for Eat It (1985), Poodle Hat (2004), and Mandatory Fun (2015).

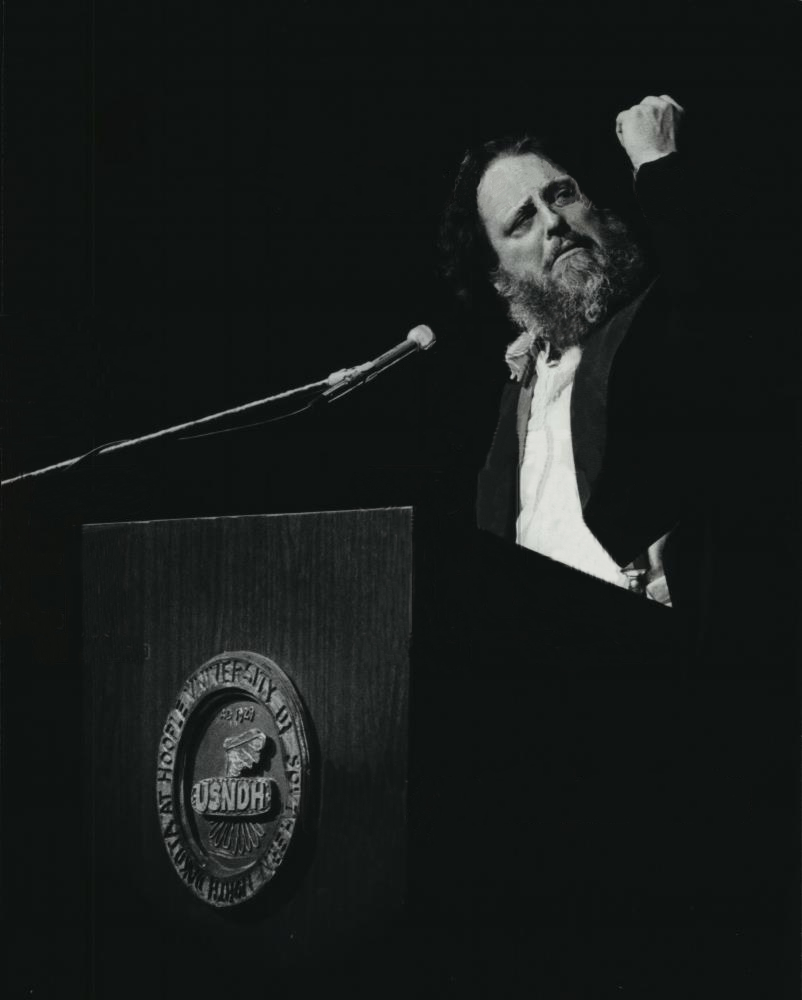
Four-time winner Peter Schickele won for 1712 Overture and Other Musical Assaults (1990), Oedipus Tex and Other Choral Calamities (1991), WTWP Classical Talkity-Talk Radio (1992), and Music for an Awful Lot of Winds and Percussion (1993).

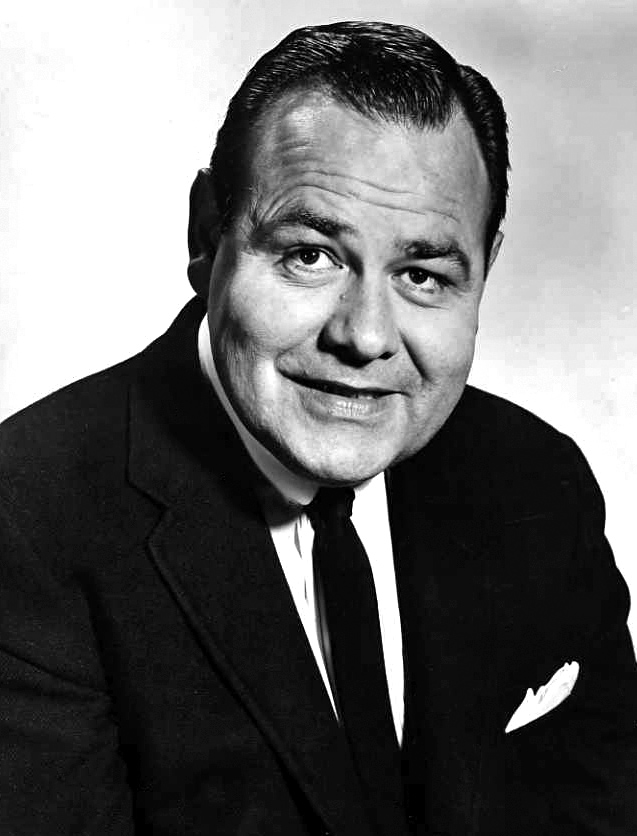
8-time nominee Jonathan Winters won for Crank(y) Calls in 1996

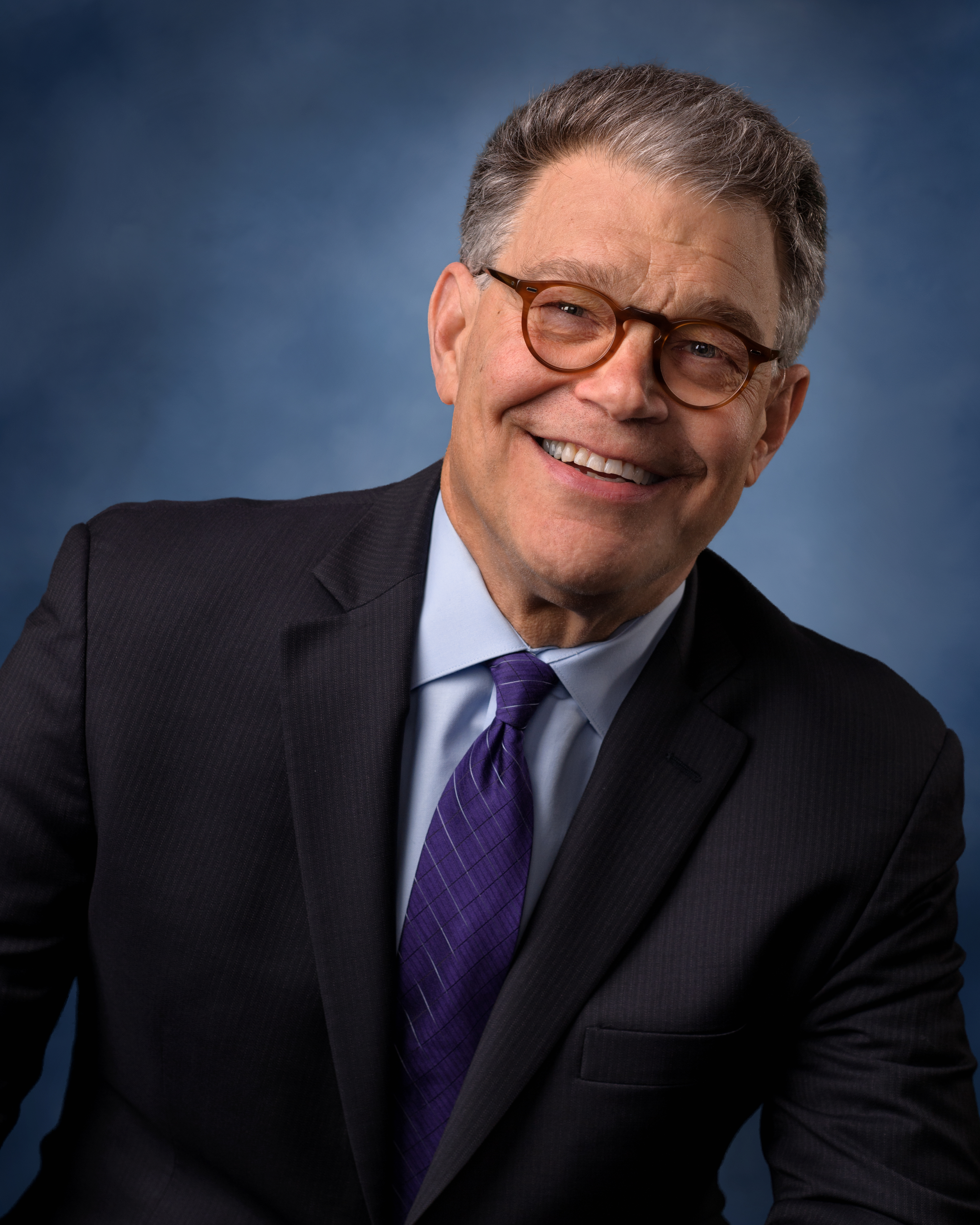
Al Franken won for You're Good Enough, You're Smart Enough, and Doggone it, People Like You! in 1997

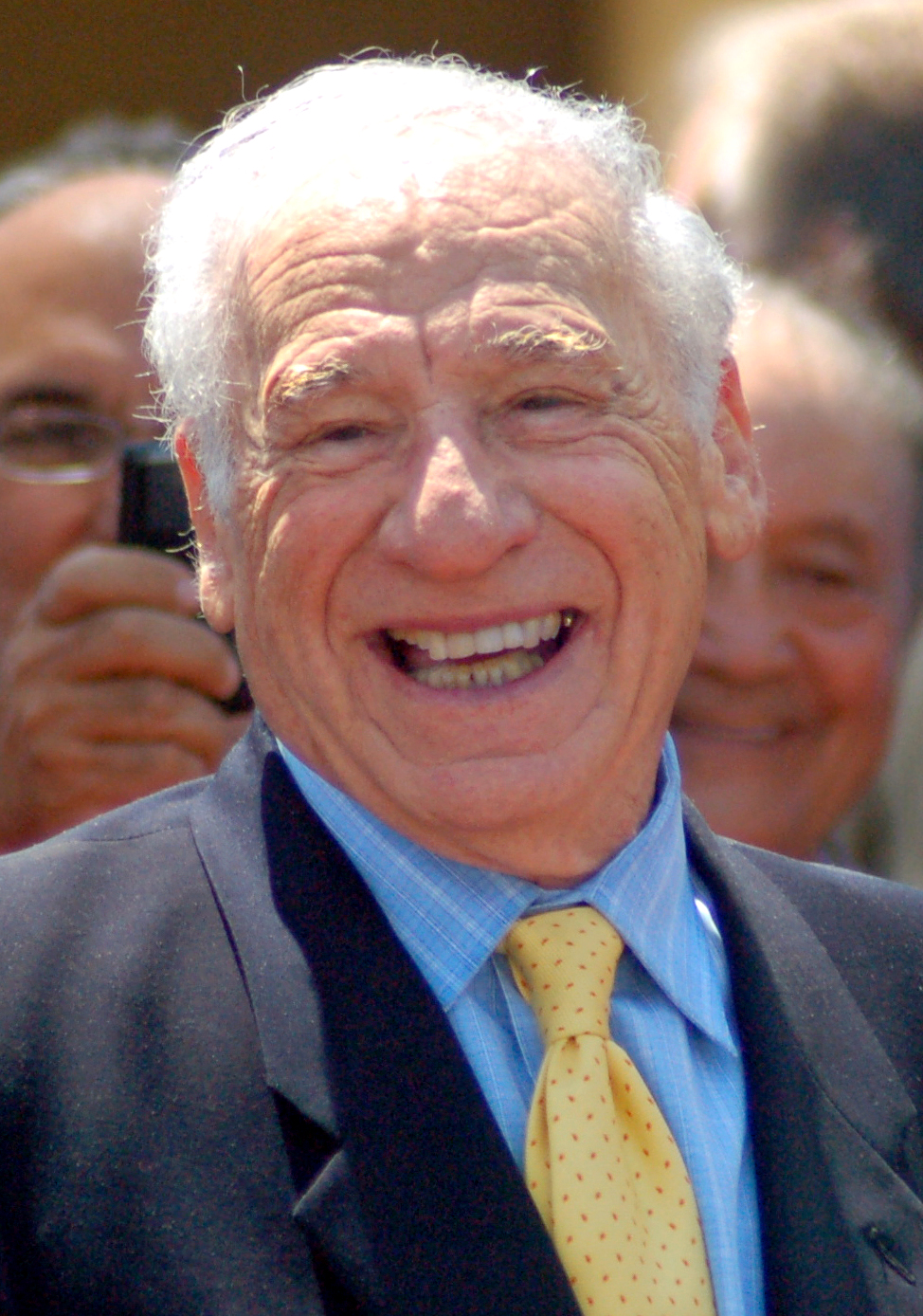
Mel Brooks won alongside Carl Reiner for 2000 Year Old Man in 1999

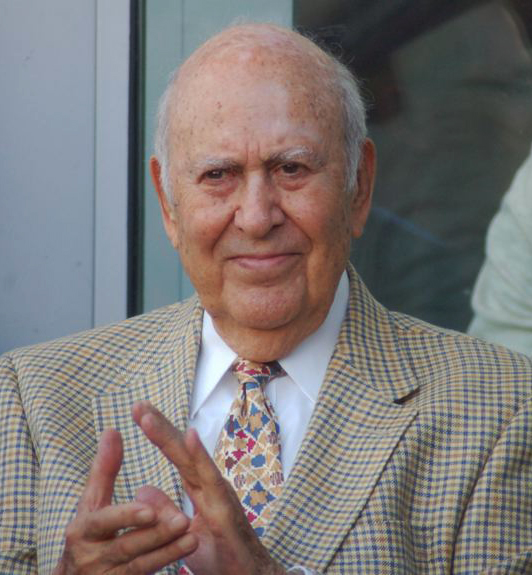
Carl Reiner won alongside Mel Brooks for 2000 Year Old Man in 1999.

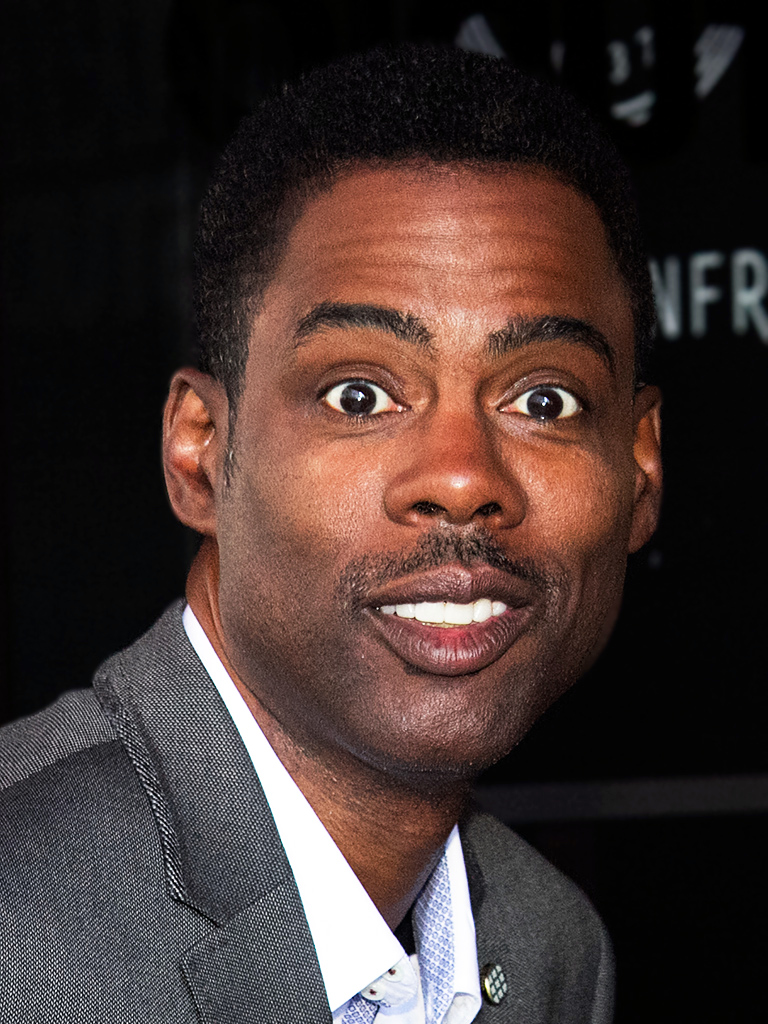
Three-time winner Chris Rock won for Roll with the New (1998), Bigger & Blacker (2000), and Never Scared (2006).

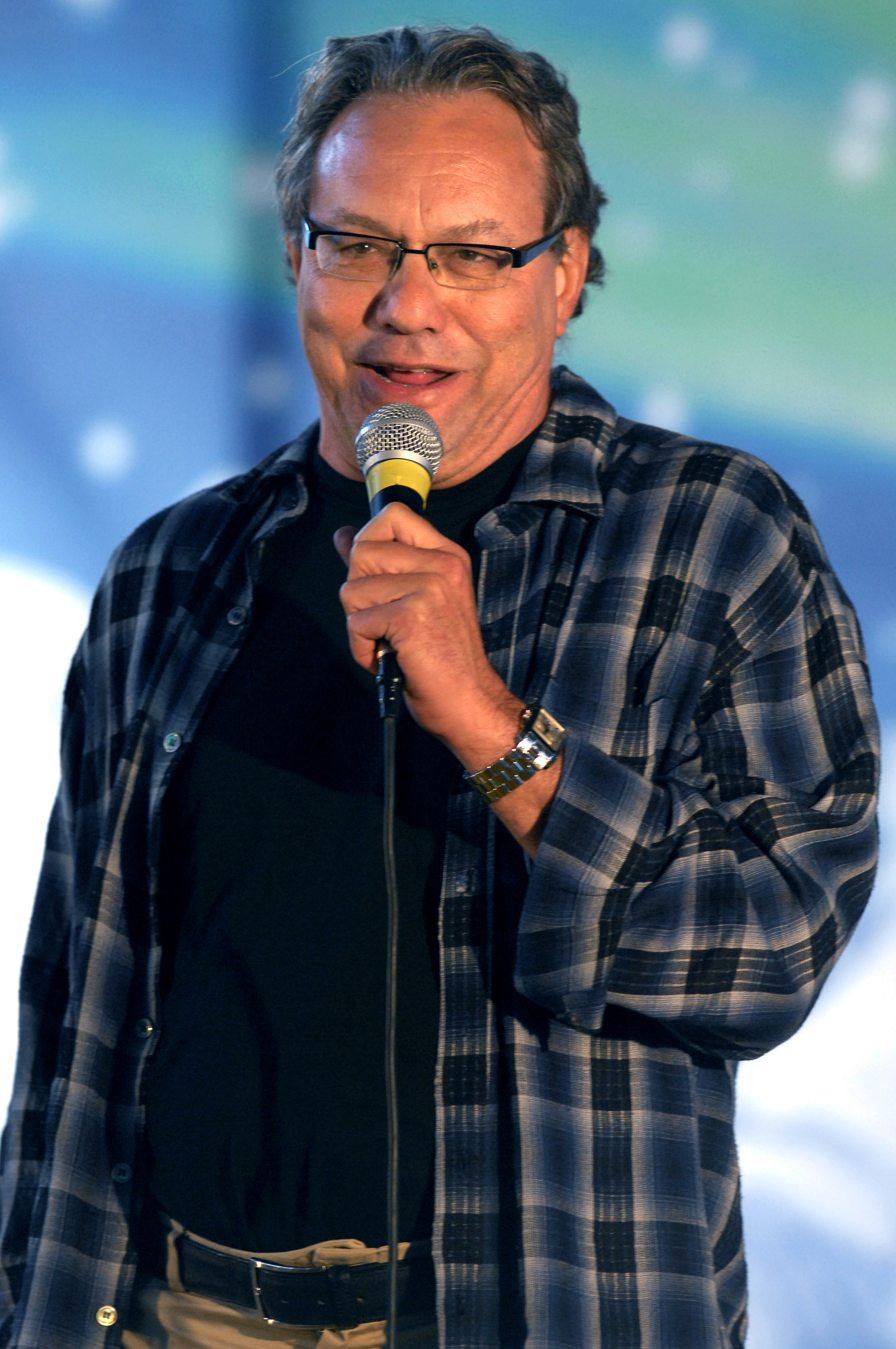
Two-time winner Lewis Black.

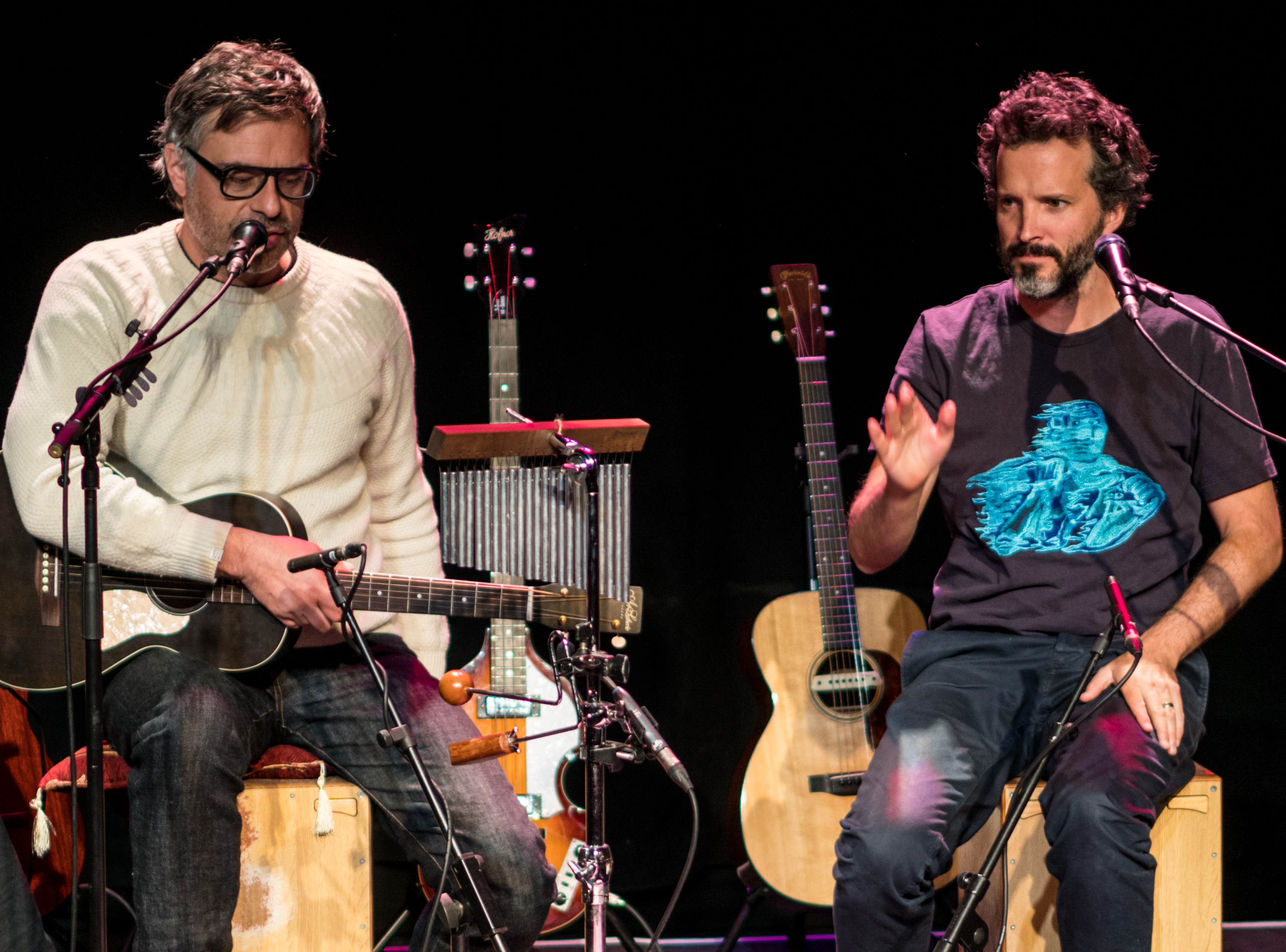
Flight of the Conchords won for The Distant Future in 2008.

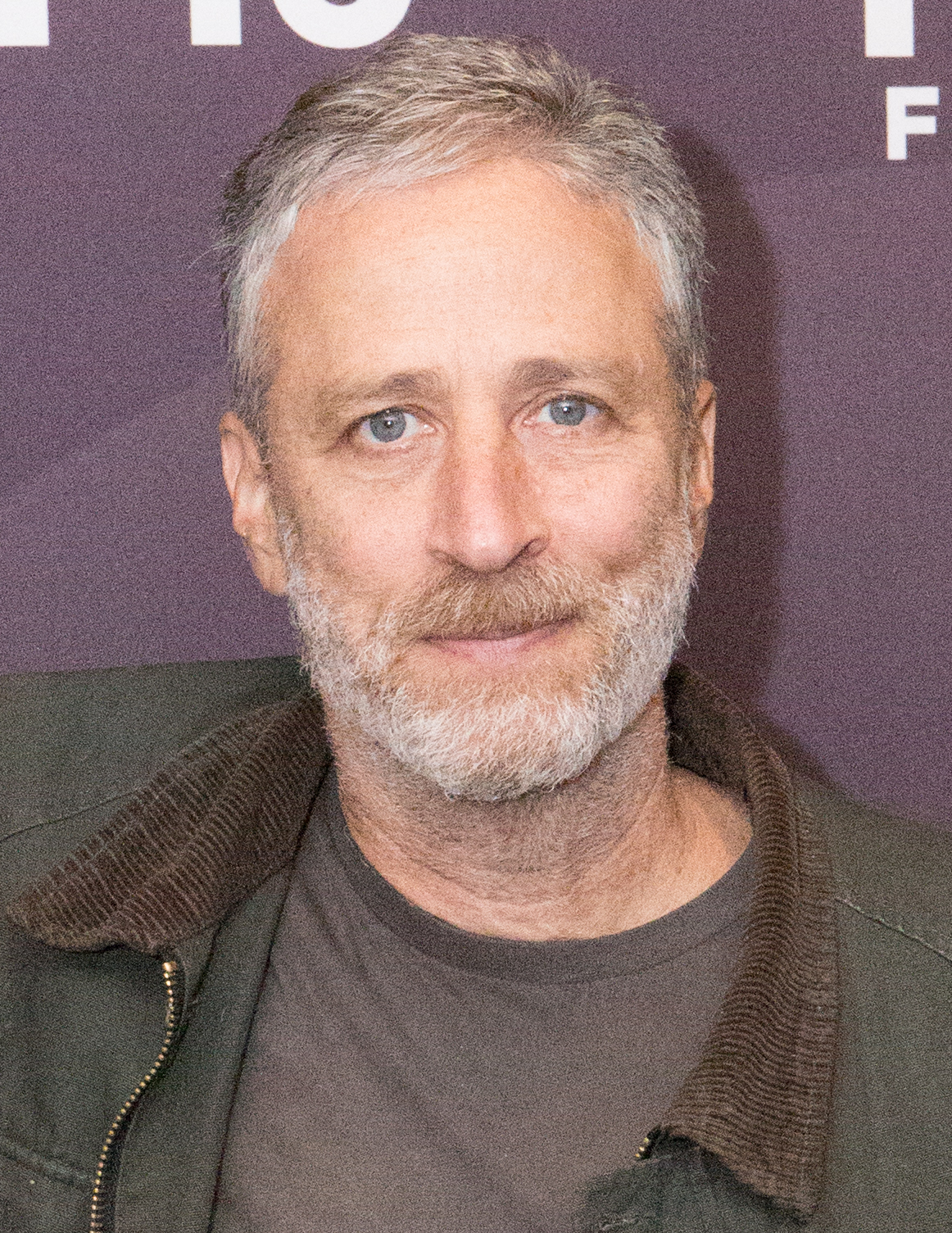
Jon Stewart won for The Daily Show with Jon Stewart Presents ... America: A Citizen's Guide to Democracy Inaction in 2005.

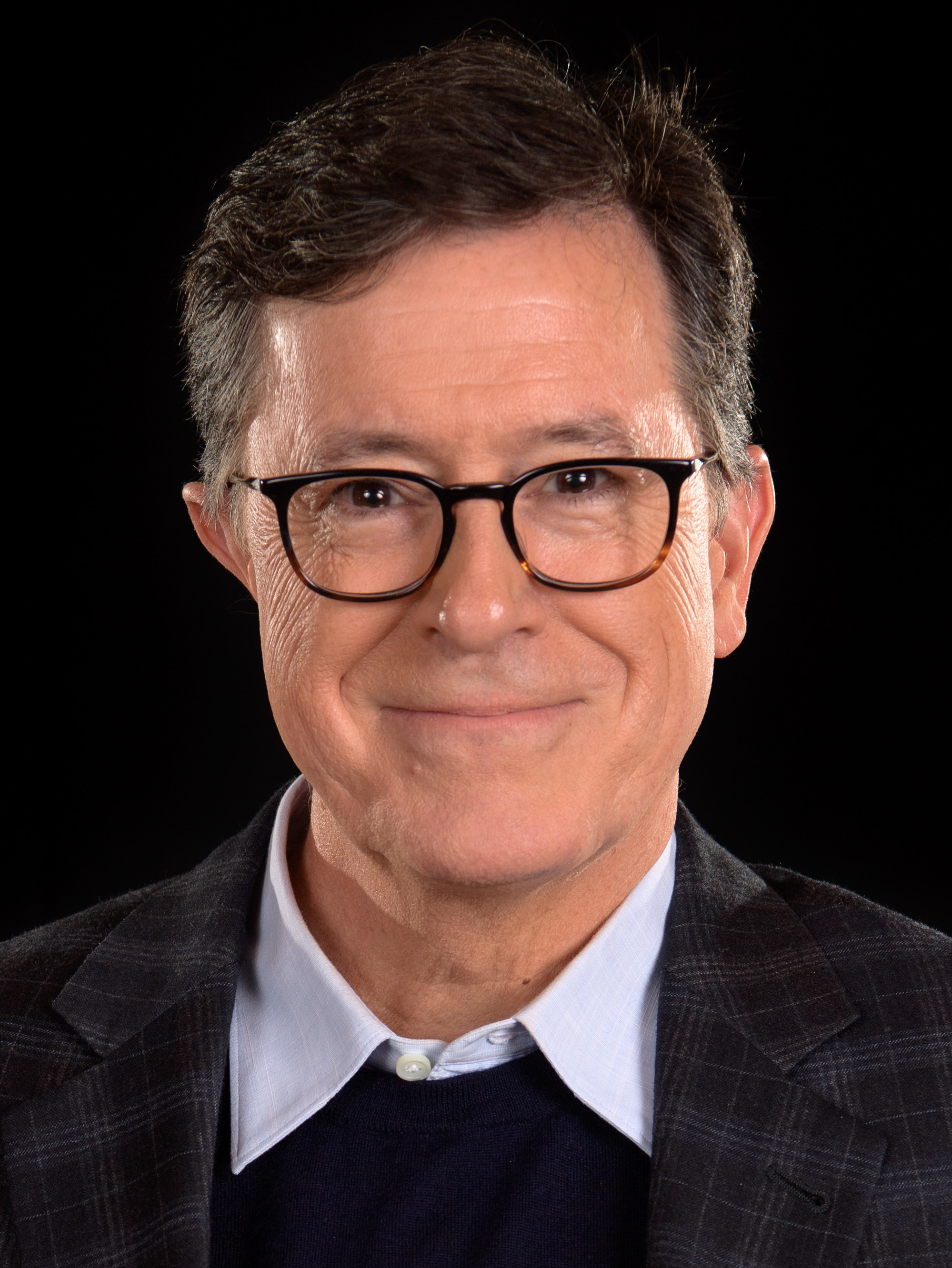
Stephen Colbert won for A Colbert Christmas: The Greatest Gift of All! in 2010.

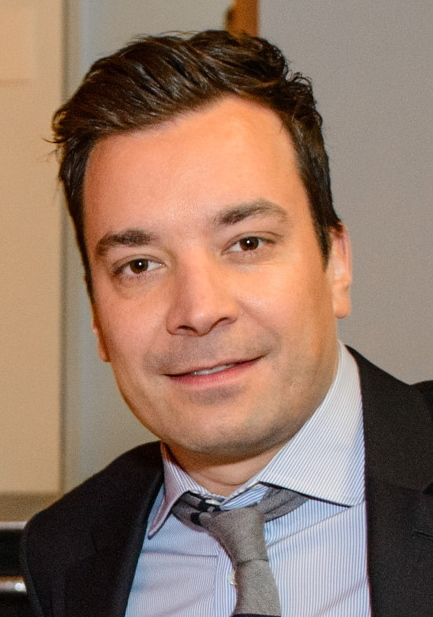
Jimmy Fallon won for Blow Your Pants Off in 2013.

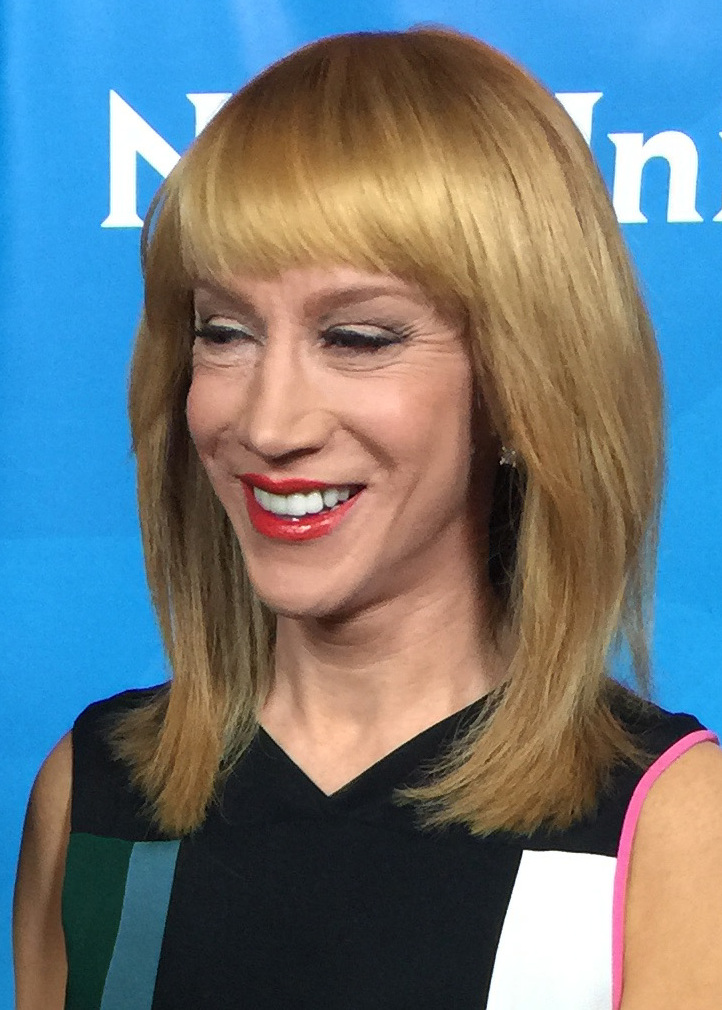
Kathy Griffin won for Calm Down Gurrl (2014).

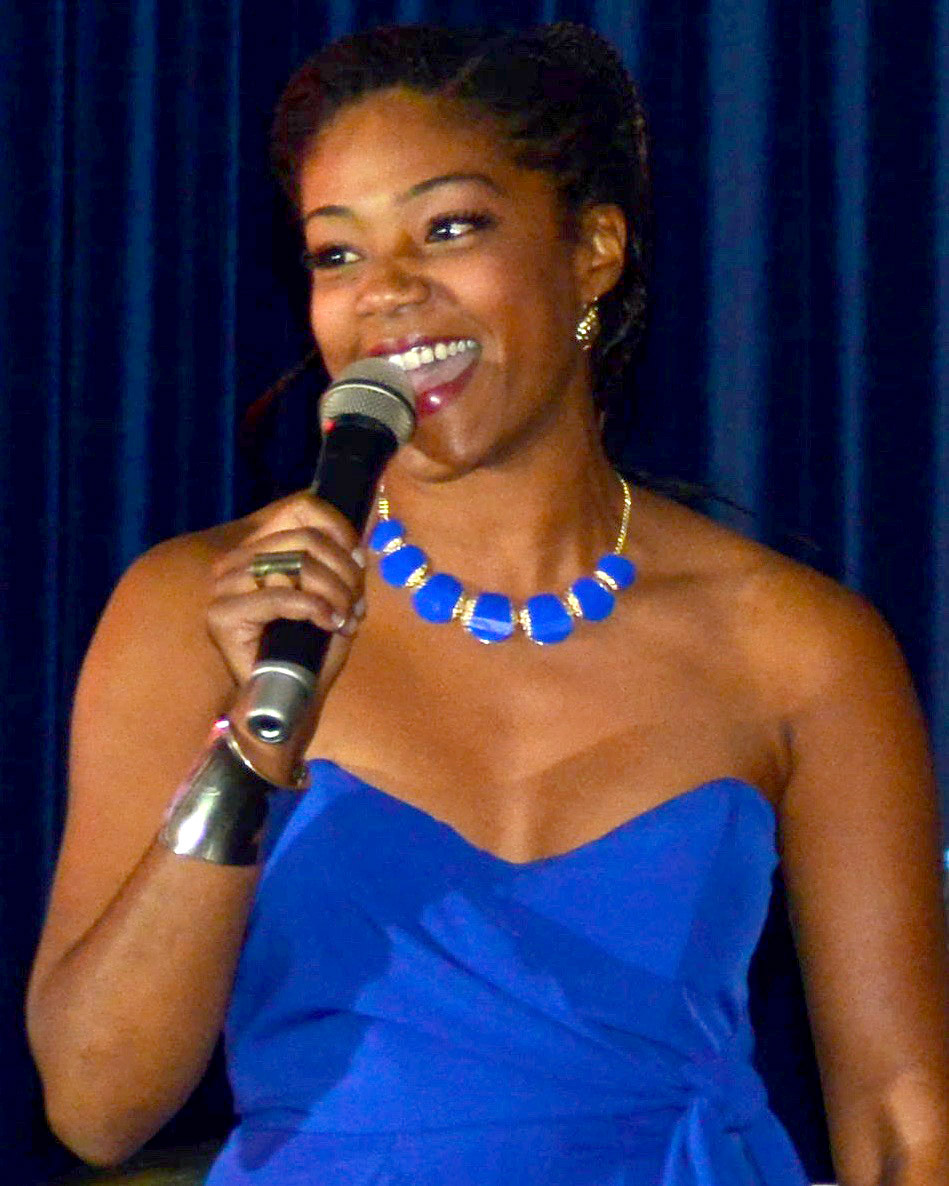
Tiffany Haddish won for Black Mitzvah (2021).

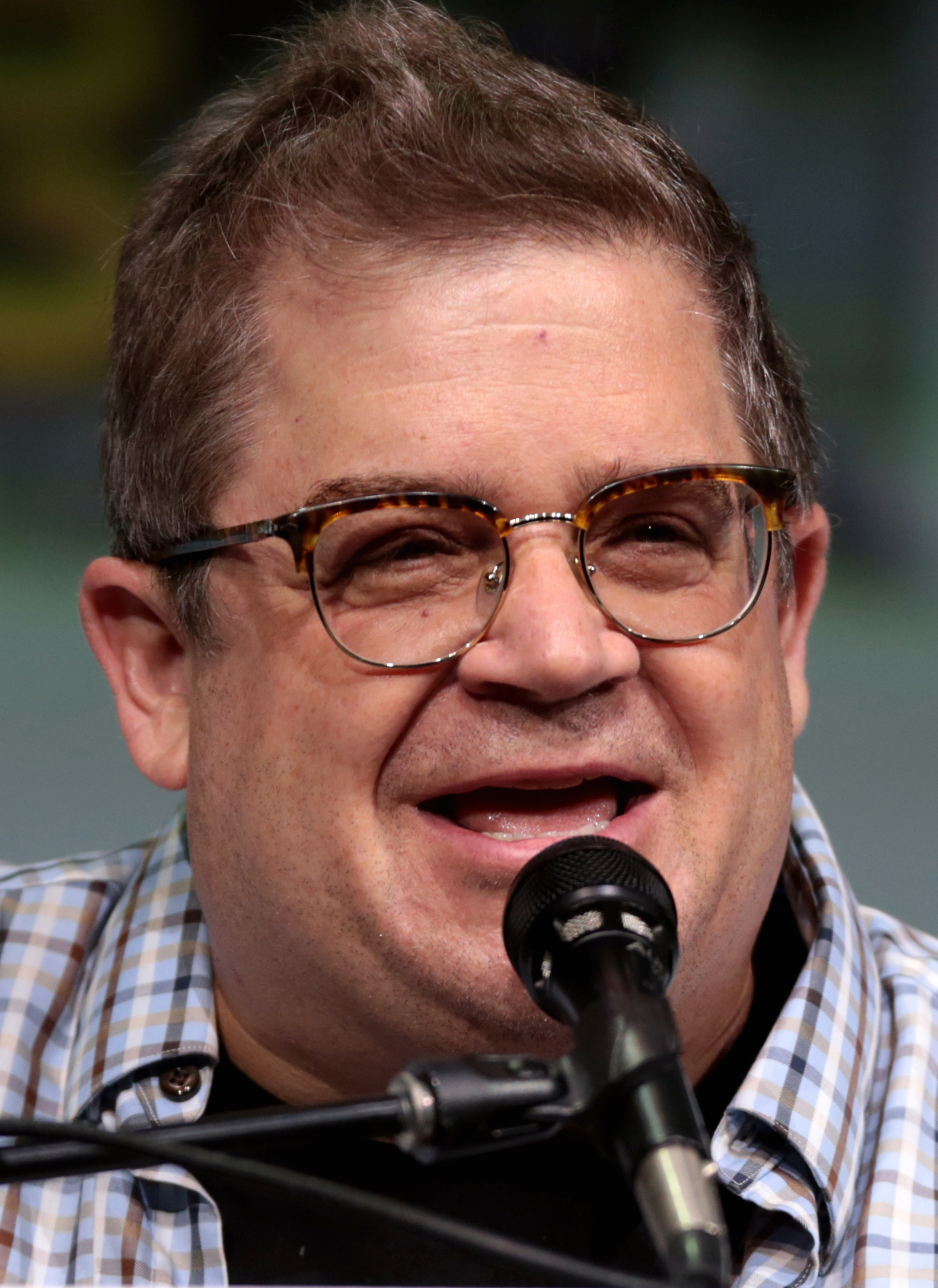
Patton Oswalt won for Talking for Clapping (2017).

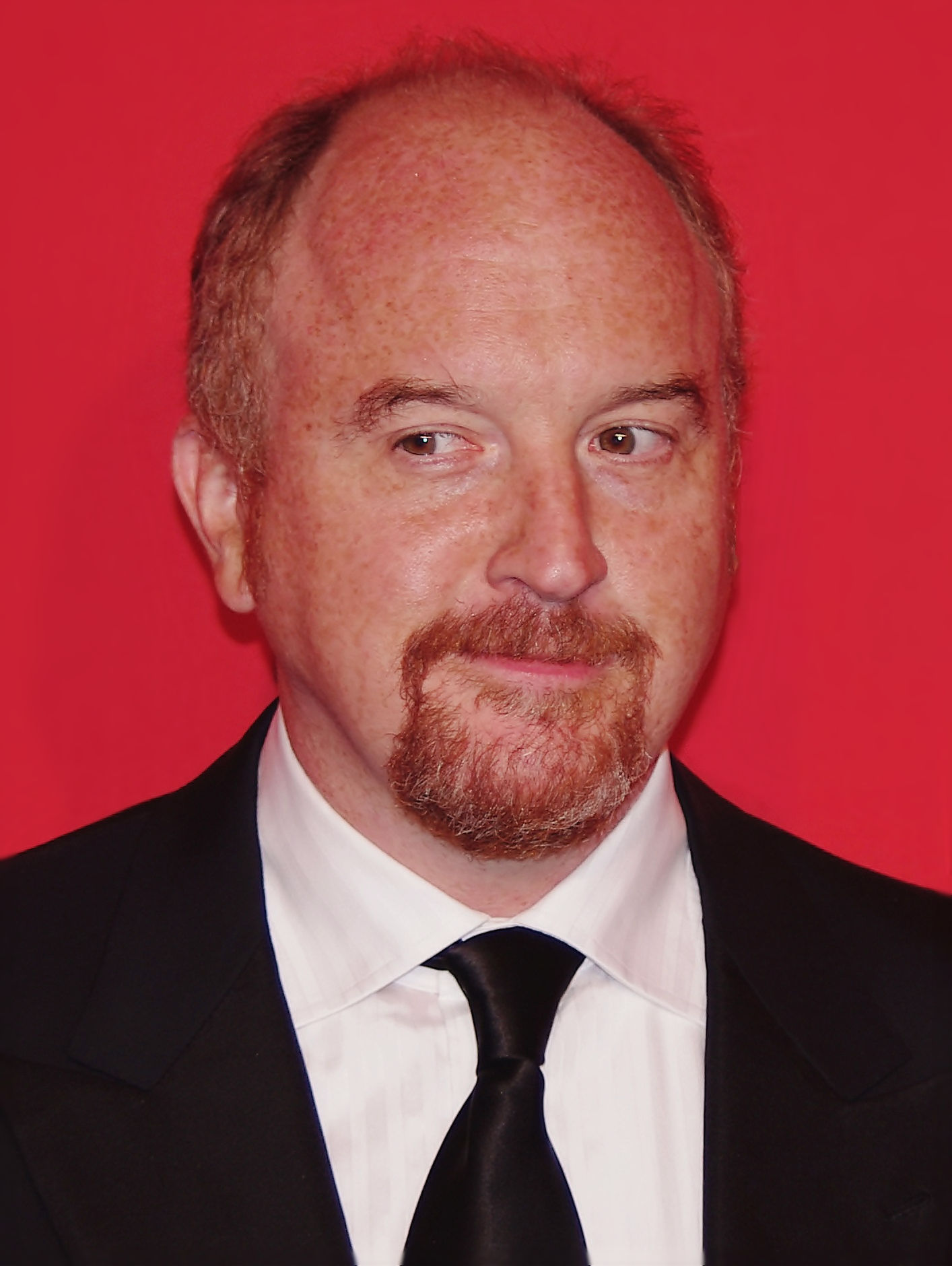
5-time nominee Louis C.K. won thrice for Hilarious (2012), Live at Madison Square Garden (2016), and Sincerely Louis CK (2022).

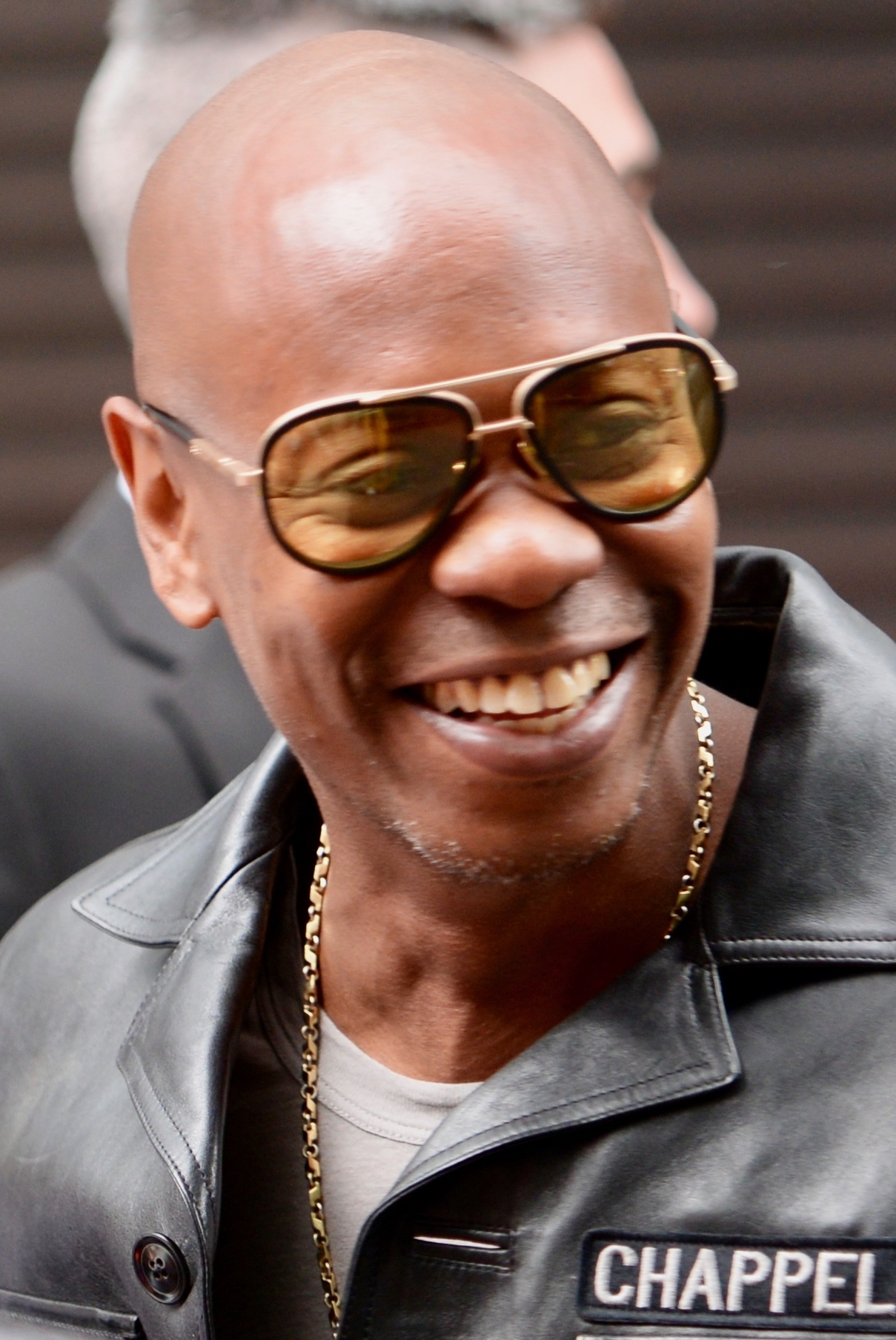
Dave Chappelle has been nominated for and won six awards winning for The Age of Spin & Deep in the Heart of Texas (2018), Equanimity & The Bird Revelation (2019), Sticks & Stones (2020), The Closer (2023), What's In A Name? (2024), and The Dreamer (2025).

The winner is the first-named artist and work for each year, or, for 1960 and 1961, category.

=== 1950s ===
| Year^{[I]} | Work | Performing Artist |
|---|---|---|
| 1959 | "The Chipmunk Song (Christmas Don't Be Late)" | Ross Bagdasarian Sr. |
| 1959 | The Best of the Stan Freberg Shows | Stan Freberg |
| 1959 | The Future Lies Ahead | Mort Sahl |
| 1959 | "Green Chri$tma$" | Stan Freberg |
| 1959 | Improvisations to Music | Elaine May and Mike Nichols |

=== 1960s ===
| Year^{[I]} | Work | Performing Artist |
| 1960 | Musical Comedy | |
|---|---|---|
| 1960 | "The Battle of Kookamonga" | Homer and Jethro |
| 1960 | Charlie Weaver Sings for His People | Cliff Arquette |
| 1960 | Monster Rally | Hans Conried and Alice Pearce |
| 1960 | Musically Mad | Bernie Green |
| 1960 | A Party with Betty Comden and Adolph Green | Betty Comden and Adolph Green |
| 1960 | Spoken Comedy | |
| 1960 | Inside Shelley Berman | Shelley Berman |
| 1960 | "Hamlet" | Andy Griffith |
| 1960 | Look Forward in Anger | Mort Sahl |
| 1960 | The Sick Humor of Lenny Bruce | Lenny Bruce |
| 1960 | Stan Freberg with Original Cast | Stan Freberg |
| 1961 | Musical Comedy | |
| 1961 | Jonathan and Darlene Edwards in Paris | Jo Stafford and Paul Weston |
| 1961 | "Alvin for President" | David Seville |
| 1961 | An Evening Wasted with Tom Lehrer | Tom Lehrer |
| 1961 | Homer and Jethro at the Country Club | Homer and Jethro |
| 1961 | "The Old Payola Roll Blues" | Stan Freberg |
| 1961 | Spoken Comedy | |
| 1961 | The Button-Down Mind Strikes Back! | Bob Newhart |
| 1961 | 2000 Year Old Man | Mel Brooks and Carl Reiner |
| 1961 | The Edge of Shelley Berman | Shelley Berman |
| 1961 | The Wonderful World of Jonathan Winters | Jonathan Winters |
| 1962 | An Evening with Mike Nichols and Elaine May | Elaine May and Mike Nichols |
| 1962 | Here's Jonathan | Jonathan Winters |
| 1962 | José Jiménez the Astronaut | Bill Dana |
| 1962 | Stan Freberg Presents the United States of America Volume One: The Early Years | Stan Freberg |
| 1963 | The First Family | Vaughn Meader |
| 1963 | Another Day, Another World | Jonathan Winters |
| 1963 | Beyond the Fringe | Alan Bennett, Peter Cook, Jonathan Miller and Dudley Moore |
| 1963 | My Son, the Folk Singer | Allan Sherman |
| 1963 | Nichols and May Examine Doctors | Elaine May and Mike Nichols |
| 1964 | "Hello Muddah, Hello Fadduh (A Letter from Camp)" | Allan Sherman |
| 1964 | Bill Cosby Is a Very Funny Fellow...Right! | Bill Cosby |
| 1964 | Carl Reiner and Mel Brooks at the Cannes Film Festival | Mel Brooks and Carl Reiner |
| 1964 | I Am the Greatest! | Cassius Clay |
| 1964 | Think Ethnic | Smothers Brothers |
| 1965 | I Started Out as a Child | Bill Cosby |
| 1965 | For Swingin' Livers Only! | Allan Sherman |
| 1965 | Ready or Not, Here Comes Godfrey Cambridge | Godfrey Cambridge |
| 1965 | Whistle Stopping | Jonathan Winters |
| 1965 | Woody Allen | Woody Allen |
| 1966 | Why Is There Air? | Bill Cosby |
| 1966 | Mom Always Liked You Best | Smothers Brothers |
| 1966 | Them Cotton Pickin' Days Is Over | Godfrey Cambridge |
| 1966 | "Welcome to the LBJ Ranch!" | Earl Doud and Allen Robin |
| 1966 | You Don't Have to Be Jewish | Bob Booker and George Foster |
| 1967 | Wonderfulness | Bill Cosby |
| 1967 | "Downtown" | Mrs. Miller |
| 1967 | Funny Way to Make an Album | Don Bowman |
| 1967 | Have a Laugh on Me | Archie Campbell |
| 1967 | Wanted for Murder | Homer and Jethro |
| 1968 | Revenge | Bill Cosby |
| 1968 | The Cockfight and Other Tall Tales | Archie Campbell |
| 1968 | Cowboys and Colored People | Flip Wilson |
| 1968 | Lenny Bruce in Concert | Lenny Bruce |
| 1968 | Take-Offs and Put-Ons | George Carlin |
| 1969 | To Russell, My Brother, Whom I Slept With | Bill Cosby |
| 1969 | Hello Dummy! | Don Rickles |
| 1969 | Rowan and Martin's Laugh-In | Dan Rowan and Dick Martin |
| 1969 | You Devil You | Flip Wilson |

=== 1970s ===
| Year^{[I]} | Work | Performing Artist |
|---|---|---|
| 1970 | Sports | Bill Cosby |
| 1970 | Berkeley Concert | Lenny Bruce |
| 1970 | Don Rickles Speaks! | Don Rickles |
| 1971 | The Devil Made Me Buy This Dress | Flip Wilson |
| 1971 | The Begatting of the President | Orson Welles |
| 1971 | "Daddy Played First Base" | Homer and Jethro |
| 1971 | I Am the President | David Frye |
| 1971 | Live: Madison Square Garden Center | Bill Cosby |
| 1972 | This Is a Recording | Lily Tomlin |
| 1972 | "Ajax Liquor Store" | Hudson & Landry |
| 1972 | Cheech and Chong | Cheech & Chong |
| 1972 | Flip: The Flip Wilson Show | Flip Wilson |
| 1972 | When I Was a Kid | Bill Cosby |
| 1973 | FM & AM | George Carlin |
| 1973 | All in the Family | Carroll O'Connor, Jean Stapleton, Sally Struthers and Rob Reiner |
| 1973 | Big Bambu | Cheech & Chong |
| 1973 | Geraldine: Don't Fight the Feeling | Flip Wilson |
| 1974 | Los Cochinos | Cheech & Chong |
| 1974 | Child of the 50s | Robert Klein |
| 1974 | Fat Albert | Bill Cosby |
| 1974 | National Lampoon: Lemmings | National Lampoon |
| 1974 | Occupation: Foole | George Carlin |
| 1974 | Richard Nixon: A Fantasy | David Frye |
| 1975 | That Nigger's Crazy | Richard Pryor |
| 1975 | Booga! Booga! | David Steinberg |
| 1975 | Cheech & Chong's Wedding Album | Cheech & Chong |
| 1975 | Mind Over Matter | Robert Klein |
| 1975 | The Missing White House Tapes | National Lampoon |
| 1976 | Is It Something I Said? | Richard Pryor |
| 1976 | An Evening with Wally Londo Featuring Bill Slaszo | George Carlin |
| 1976 | Modern Scream | Lily Tomlin |
| 1976 | The Monty Python Matching Tie and Handkerchief | Monty Python |
| 1976 | A Star Is Bought | Albert Brooks |
| 1977 | Bicentennial Nigger | Richard Pryor |
| 1977 | Bill Cosby Is Not Himself These Days | Bill Cosby |
| 1977 | Goodbye Pop 1952–1976 | National Lampoon |
| 1977 | Sleeping Beauty | Cheech & Chong |
| 1977 | You Gotta Wash Your Ass | Redd Foxx |
| 1978 | Let's Get Small | Steve Martin |
| 1978 | Are You Serious??? | Richard Pryor |
| 1978 | The Ernie Kovacs Album | Ernie Kovacs |
| 1978 | On the Road | George Carlin |
| 1978 | Saturday Night Live | Lorne Michaels and Saturday Night Live cast members |
| 1979 | A Wild and Crazy Guy | Steve Martin |
| 1979 | On Stage | Lily Tomlin |
| 1979 | The Rutles | The Rutles |
| 1979 | Sex & Violins | Martin Mull |
| 1979 | The Wizard of Comedy | Richard Pryor |

=== 1980s ===
| Year^{[I]} | Work | Performing Artist |
|---|---|---|
| 1980 | Reality...What a Concept | Robin Williams |
| 1980 | Comedy Is Not Pretty! | Steve Martin |
| 1980 | "I Need Your Help Barry Manilow" | Ray Stevens |
| 1980 | "Rubber Biscuit" | The Blues Brothers |
| 1980 | Wanted: Live in Concert | Richard Pryor |
| 1981 | No Respect | Rodney Dangerfield |
| 1981 | Holy Smoke | Richard Pryor |
| 1981 | Live at St. Douglas Convent | Father Guido Sarducci |
| 1981 | Live from New York | Gilda Radner |
| 1981 | Monty Python's Contractual Obligation Album | Monty Python |
| 1982 | Rev. Du Rite | Richard Pryor |
| 1982 | Airplane! | Various Artists |
| 1982 | "The Inquisition" | Mel Brooks |
| 1982 | Mel Brooks' History of the World, Part I | Mel Brooks |
| 1982 | Urban Chipmunk | Alvin and the Chipmunks |
| 1983 | Live on the Sunset Strip | Richard Pryor |
| 1983 | Eddie Murphy | Eddie Murphy |
| 1983 | The Great White North | Bob and Doug McKenzie |
| 1983 | A Place for My Stuff | George Carlin |
| 1983 | The Steve Martin Brothers | Steve Martin |
| 1984 | Comedian | Eddie Murphy |
| 1984 | Himself | Bill Cosby |
| 1984 | Monty Python's The Meaning of Life | Monty Python |
| 1984 | Throbbing Python of Love | Robin Williams |
| 1984 | What Becomes a Semi-Legend Most? | Joan Rivers |
| 1985 | "Eat It" | "Weird Al" Yankovic |
| 1985 | Here and Now | Richard Pryor |
| 1985 | Hurt Me Baby – Make Me Write Bad Checks! | Rick Dees |
| 1985 | Rappin' Rodney | Rodney Dangerfield |
| 1985 | The Three Faces of Al | Firesign Theatre |
| 1986 | Whoopi Goldberg: Original Broadway Show Recording | Whoopi Goldberg |
| 1986 | "Born in East L.A." | Cheech & Chong |
| 1986 | Dare to Be Stupid | "Weird Al" Yankovic |
| 1986 | "Honeymooners Rap" | Joe Piscopo |
| 1986 | "You Look Marvelous" | Billy Crystal |
| 1987 | Those of You with or Without Children, You'll Understand | Bill Cosby |
| 1987 | Bob and Ray: A Night of Two Stars Recorded Live at Carnegie Hall | Bob Elliott and Ray Goulding |
| 1987 | I Have a Pony | Steven Wright |
| 1987 | Mud Will Be Flung Tonight | Bette Midler |
| 1987 | Playin' with Your Head | George Carlin |
| 1987 | "Twist and Shout" | Rodney Dangerfield |
| 1988 | A Night at the Met | Robin Williams |
| 1988 | The Best of Bob and Ray, Vol. 1 | Bob Elliott and Ray Goulding |
| 1988 | Polka Party! | "Weird Al" Yankovic |
| 1988 | The World According to Me! | Jackie Mason |
| 1988 | "Would Jesus Wear a Rolex" | Ray Stevens |
| 1989 | Good Morning, Vietnam | Robin Williams |
| 1989 | Even Worse | "Weird Al" Yankovic |
| 1989 | Finally Captured | Jonathan Winters |
| 1989 | Fontaine: Why Am I Straight? | Whoopi Goldberg |
| 1989 | What Am I Doing in New Jersey? | George Carlin |

=== 1990s ===
| Year^{[I]} | Work | Performing Artist |
|---|---|---|
| 1990 | P.D.Q. Bach: 1712 Overture & Other Musical Assaults | Peter Schickele |
| 1990 | Dice | Andrew Dice Clay |
| 1990 | Motherhood: The Second Oldest Profession | Erma Bombeck |
| 1990 | "Wild Thing" | Sam Kinison |
| 1990 | Without You I'm Nothing | Sandra Bernhard |
| 1991 | P.D.Q. Bach: Oedipus Tex and Other Choral Calamities | Peter Schickele |
| 1991 | The Best of Bob and Ray: Selections from a Career, Vol. 4 | Bob Elliott and Ray Goulding |
| 1991 | The Best of Comic Relief '90 | Various artists |
| 1991 | Jonathan Winters into the '90s | Jonathan Winters |
| 1991 | More News from Lake Wobegon | Garrison Keillor |
| 1992 | P.D.Q. Bach: WTWP Classical Talkity-Talk Radio | Peter Schickele |
| 1992 | Brand New | Jackie Mason |
| 1992 | Local Man Moves to the City | Garrison Keillor |
| 1992 | Parental Advisory: Explicit Lyrics | George Carlin |
| 1992 | When You Look Like Your Passport Photo, It's Time to Go Home | Erma Bombeck |
| 1993 | P.D.Q. Bach: Music for an Awful Lot of Winds and Percussion | Peter Schickele |
| 1993 | An Evening with George Burns | George Burns |
| 1993 | Jonathan Winters Is Terminator 3 | Jonathan Winters |
| 1993 | Naked Beneath My Clothes | Rita Rudner |
| 1993 | Off the Deep End | "Weird Al" Yankovic |
| 1994 | Jammin' in New York | George Carlin |
| 1994 | Lake Wobegon USA | Garrison Keillor |
| 1994 | A Marriage Made in Heaven or Too Tired for an Affair | Erma Bombeck |
| 1994 | The Naked Truth | Leslie Nielsen |
| 1994 | You're Good Enough, You're Smart Enough, and Doggone It, People Like You! | Al Franken |
| 1995 | Live from Hell | Sam Kinison |
| 1995 | Attention Butt Pirates and Lesbetarians | Judy Tenuta |
| 1995 | The Jerky Boys 2 | The Jerky Boys |
| 1995 | The Official Politically Correct Dictionary and Handbook | Henry Beard and Christopher Cerf |
| 1995 | They're All Gonna Laugh at You! | Adam Sandler |
| 1996 | Crank(y) Calls | Jonathan Winters |
| 1996 | Funk It | Martin Lawrence |
| 1996 | Games Rednecks Play | Jeff Foxworthy |
| 1996 | God's Other Son | Don Imus |
| 1996 | In Goddess We Trust | Judy Tenuta |
| 1997 | Rush Limbaugh Is a Big Fat Idiot and Other Observations | Al Franken |
| 1997 | The Definitive Biography of P.D.Q. Bach | Peter Schickele |
| 1997 | The Rants | Dennis Miller |
| 1997 | Stan Freberg Presents the United States of America Vol. 2 (The Middle Years) | Stan Freberg |
| 1997 | What the Hell Happened to Me? | Adam Sandler |
| 1998 | Roll with the New | Chris Rock |
| 1998 | Button Down Concert | Bob Newhart |
| 1998 | Dirty Jokes and Beer | Drew Carey |
| 1998 | Garrison Keillor's Comedy Theater | Garrison Keillor |
| 1998 | God Said Ha! | Julia Sweeney |
| 1999 | The 2000 Year Old Man in the Year 2000 | Mel Brooks and Carl Reiner |
| 1999 | Give Me Immortality or Give Me Death | The Firesign Theatre |
| 1999 | I'm Telling You for the Last Time | Jerry Seinfeld |
| 1999 | Pure Drivel | Steve Martin |
| 1999 | Totally Committed | Jeff Foxworthy |

=== 2000s ===
| Year^{[I]} | Work | Performing Artist |
|---|---|---|
| 2000 | Bigger & Blacker | Chris Rock |
| 2000 | How Paul Robeson Saved My Life and Other Mostly Happy Stories | Carl Reiner |
| 2000 | A Prairie Home Companion – 25th Anniversary Collection | Garrison Keillor |
| 2000 | Stan and Judy's Kid | Adam Sandler |
| 2000 | You Are All Diseased | George Carlin |
| 2001 | Brain Droppings | George Carlin |
| 2001 | Big Funny | Jeff Foxworthy |
| 2001 | I Rant, Therefore, I Am | Dennis Miller |
| 2001 | The Original Kings of Comedy | Steve Harvey, Bernie Mac, Cedric the Entertainer and D. L. Hughley |
| 2001 | The Prisoner of Second Avenue | Richard Dreyfuss and Marsha Mason |
| 2002 | Napalm & Silly Putty | George Carlin |
| 2002 | Bride of Firesign | The Firesign Theatre |
| 2002 | I'm the One That I Want | Margaret Cho |
| 2002 | Live at Carnegie Hall | Ray Romano |
| 2002 | The Queens of Comedy | Adele Givens, Laura Hayes, Mo'Nique, and Sommore |
| 2003 | Robin Williams: Live 2002 | Robin Williams |
| 2003 | The Bathroom Wall | Jimmy Fallon |
| 2003 | Complaints and Grievances | George Carlin |
| 2003 | Oh, the Things I Know! | Al Franken |
| 2003 | The Rant Zone | Dennis Miller |
| 2004 | Poodle Hat | "Weird Al" Yankovic |
| 2004 | A Life in Comedy | Garrison Keillor |
| 2004 | Revolution | Margaret Cho |
| 2004 | Shut Up You Fucking Baby! | David Cross |
| 2004 | Team Leader | George Lopez |
| 2005 | The Daily Show with Jon Stewart Presents... America: A Citizen's Guide to Democracy Inaction | Jon Stewart and the Cast of The Daily Show |
| 2005 | Come Poop with Me | Triumph the Insult Comic Dog (Robert Smigel) |
| 2005 | The Funny Thing Is... | Ellen DeGeneres |
| 2005 | Live at Carnegie Hall | David Sedaris |
| 2005 | The O'Franken Factor Factor — The Best of the O'Franken Factor | Al Franken |
| 2006 | Never Scared | Chris Rock |
| 2006 | The Agoraphobic Cowboy | Rick Moranis |
| 2006 | Family Guy: Live in Vegas | Seth MacFarlane and Walter Murphy |
| 2006 | Luther Burbank Performing Arts Center Blues | Lewis Black |
| 2006 | The Right to Bare Arms | Larry the Cable Guy |
| 2007 | The Carnegie Hall Performance | Lewis Black |
| 2007 | Blue Collar Comedy Tour — One for the Road | Bill Engvall, Ron White, Jeff Foxworthy and Larry the Cable Guy |
| 2007 | Life Is Worth Losing | George Carlin |
| 2007 | Straight Outta Lynwood | "Weird Al" Yankovic |
| 2007 | You Can't Fix Stupid | Ron White |
| 2008 | The Distant Future | Flight of the Conchords |
| 2008 | America's Mexican | George Lopez |
| 2008 | Dirty Girl | Lisa Lampanelli |
| 2008 | I Still Have a Pony | Steven Wright |
| 2008 | Songs Pointed & Pointless | Harry Shearer |
| 2009 | It's Bad for Ya | George Carlin |
| 2009 | Anticipation | Lewis Black |
| 2009 | Flight of the Conchords | Flight of the Conchords |
| 2009 | For Your Consideration | Kathy Griffin |
| 2009 | Songs of the Bushmen | Harry Shearer |

=== 2010s ===
| Year^{[I]} | Work | Performing Artist |
|---|---|---|
| 2010 | A Colbert Christmas: The Greatest Gift of All! | Stephen Colbert |
| 2010 | Back from the Dead | Spinal Tap |
| 2010 | Internet Leaks | "Weird Al" Yankovic |
| 2010 | My Weakness Is Strong | Patton Oswalt |
| 2010 | Suckin' It for the Holidays | Kathy Griffin |
| 2010 | Tall, Dark & Chicano | George Lopez |
| 2011 | Stark Raving Black | Lewis Black |
| 2011 | Cho Dependent | Margaret Cho |
| 2011 | I Told You I Was Freaky | Flight of the Conchords |
| 2011 | Kathy Griffin Does the Bible Belt | Kathy Griffin |
| 2011 | Weapons of Self Destruction | Robin Williams |
| 2012 | Hilarious | Louis C.K. |
| 2012 | 50 and Not Pregnant | Kathy Griffin |
| 2012 | Alpocalypse | "Weird Al" Yankovic |
| 2012 | Finest Hour | Patton Oswalt |
| 2012 | Turtleneck & Chain | The Lonely Island |
| 2013 | Blow Your Pants Off | Jimmy Fallon |
| 2013 | In God We Rust | Lewis Black |
| 2013 | Mr. Universe | Jim Gaffigan |
| 2013 | Rize of the Fenix | Tenacious D |
| 2013 | Seaman 1st Class | Kathy Griffin |
| 2014 | Calm Down Gurrl | Kathy Griffin |
| 2014 | I'm Here to Help | Craig Ferguson |
| 2014 | A Little Unprofessional | Ron White |
| 2014 | Live | Tig Notaro |
| 2014 | That's What I'm Talkin' About | Bob Saget |
| 2015 | Mandatory Fun | "Weird Al" Yankovic |
| 2015 | Obsessed | Jim Gaffigan |
| 2015 | Oh My God | Louis C.K. |
| 2015 | Tragedy Plus Comedy Equals Time | Patton Oswalt |
| 2015 | We Are Miracles | Sarah Silverman |
| 2016 | Live at Madison Square Garden | Louis C.K. |
| 2016 | Back to the Drawing Board | Lisa Lampanelli |
| 2016 | Brooklyn | Wyatt Cenac |
| 2016 | Just Being Honest | Craig Ferguson |
| 2016 | Happy. And a Lot | Jay Mohr |
| 2017 | Talking for Clapping | Patton Oswalt |
| 2017 | ...America...Great... | David Cross |
| 2017 | American Myth | Margaret Cho |
| 2017 | Boyish Girl Interrupted | Tig Notaro |
| 2017 | Live at the Apollo | Amy Schumer |
| 2018 | The Age of Spin & Deep in the Heart of Texas | Dave Chappelle |
| 2018 | Cinco | Jim Gaffigan |
| 2018 | Jerry Before Seinfeld | Jerry Seinfeld |
| 2018 | A Speck of Dust | Sarah Silverman |
| 2018 | What Now? | Kevin Hart |
| 2019 | Equanimity & The Bird Revelation | Dave Chappelle |
| 2019 | Annihilation | Patton Oswalt |
| 2019 | Noble Ape | Jim Gaffigan |
| 2019 | Standup for Drummers | Fred Armisen |
| 2019 | Tamborine | Chris Rock |

=== 2020s ===
| Year^{[I]} | Work | Performing Artist |
|---|---|---|
| 2020 | Sticks & Stones | Dave Chappelle |
| 2020 | Quality Time | Jim Gaffigan |
| 2020 | Relatable | Ellen DeGeneres |
| 2020 | Right Now | Aziz Ansari |
| 2020 | Son of Patricia | Trevor Noah |
| 2021 | Black Mitzvah | Tiffany Haddish |
| 2021 | 23 Hours to Kill | Jerry Seinfeld |
| 2021 | I Love Everything | Patton Oswalt |
| 2021 | The Pale Tourist | Jim Gaffigan |
| 2021 | Paper Tiger | Bill Burr |
| 2022 | Sincerely | Louis C.K. |
| 2022 | The Comedy Vaccine | Lavell Crawford |
| 2022 | Evolution | Chelsea Handler |
| 2022 | The Greatest Average American | Nate Bargatze |
| 2022 | Thanks for Risking Your Life | Lewis Black |
| 2022 | Zero Fucks Given | Kevin Hart |
| 2023 | The Closer | Dave Chappelle |
| 2023 | Comedy Monster | Jim Gaffigan |
| 2023 | A Little Brains, a Little Talent | Randy Rainbow |
| 2023 | Sorry | Louis C.K. |
| 2023 | We All Scream | Patton Oswalt |
2024
| 2024 | What's in a Name? | Dave Chappelle |
| 2024 | I Wish You Would | Trevor Noah |
| 2024 | I'm an Entertainer | Wanda Sykes |
| 2024 | Selective Outrage | Chris Rock |
| 2024 | Someone You Love | Sarah Silverman |
2025
| 2025 | The Dreamer | Dave Chappelle |
| 2025 | Armageddon | Ricky Gervais |
| 2025 | The Prisoner | Jim Gaffigan |
| 2025 | Someday You'll Die | Nikki Glaser |
| 2025 | Where Was I? | Trevor Noah |
2026
| 2026 | Your Friend, Nate Bargatze | Nate Bargatze |
| 2026 | Drop Dead Years | Bill Burr |
| 2026 | PostMortem | Sarah Silverman |
| 2026 | Single Lady | Ali Wong |
| 2026 | What Had Happened Was… | Jamie Foxx |
| 2027 | Good Girl | Nikki Glaser |
| 2027 | Joy in the Trenches | Trevor Noah |
| 2027 | Legacy | Wanda Sykes |
| 2027 | 100 Sound Effects | Fred Armisen |
| 2027 | Take a Banana for the Ride | Jeff Ross |
| 2027 | The Unstoppable... | Dave Chappelle |

== Artists with multiple wins ==
7 wins

- Bill Cosby

6 wins

- Dave Chappelle

5 wins

- George Carlin
- Richard Pryor

4 wins

- Peter Schickele
- Robin Williams

3 wins

- Chris Rock
- Louis C.K.
- "Weird Al" Yankovic

2 wins

- Lewis Black
- Steve Martin

== Artists with multiple nominations ==
16 nominations

- George Carlin

13 nominations

- Bill Cosby

10 nominations

- Richard Pryor
- "Weird Al" Yankovic

8 nominations

- Jim Gaffigan
- Jonathan Winters

7 nominations

- Dave Chappelle
- Patton Oswalt

6 nominations

- Lewis Black
- Cheech & Chong
- Stan Freberg
- Kathy Griffin
- Garrison Keillor
- Robin Williams

5 nominations

- Louis C.K.
- Steve Martin
- Chris Rock
- Peter Schickele
- Flip Wilson

4 nominations

- Mel Brooks
- Margaret Cho
- Jeff Foxworthy
- Al Franken
- Homer and Jethro
- Trevor Noah
- Carl Reiner
- Sarah Silverman

3 nominations

- Erma Bombeck
- Lenny Bruce
- Rodney Dangerfield
- Bob Elliott
- The Firesign Theatre
- Flight of the Conchords
- Ray Goulding
- George Lopez
- Elaine May
- Dennis Miller
- Monty Python
- National Lampoon
- Mike Nichols
- Adam Sandler
- Jerry Seinfeld
- Allan Sherman
- Lily Tomlin

2 nominations

- Fred Armisen
- Nate Bargatze
- Shelley Berman
- Bill Burr
- Archie Campbell
- David Cross
- Ellen DeGeneres
- Jimmy Fallon
- Craig Ferguson
- David Frye
- Nikki Glaser
- Whoopi Goldberg
- Kevin Hart
- Sam Kinison
- Robert Klein
- Lisa Lampanelli
- Larry the Cable Guy
- Jackie Mason
- Eddie Murphy
- Bob Newhart
- Tig Notaro
- Don Rickles
- Mort Sahl
- Harry Shearer
- Smothers Brothers
- Ray Stevens
- Wanda Sykes
- Judy Tenuta
- Ron White
- Steven Wright
