= Seaman 1st Class =

Live album by Kathy Griffin
- Released: August 20, 2012
- Recorded: July 26, 2012
- Genre: Comedy
- Length: 43:55
- Label: Universal Network Television LLC
- Producer: Kathy Griffin

Kathy Griffin chronology
Tired Hooker (2011)	Seaman 1st Class (2012)	Kennedie Center On-Hers (2013)

Seaman 1st Class is the fifth album and fifteenth Bravo stand-up comedy special by stand-up comedian Kathy Griffin, and her seventeenth overall. It was televised live from the Terrace Theater in Long Beach, California on July 26, 2012, on Bravo.

== Track listing ==
No.	Title	Length
1.	"Introduction"	1:35
2.	"Miley Cyrus' marriage"	1:45
3.	"Anderson Cooper on the Kathy show"	0:45
4.	"Life's a Tripp"	2:20
5.	"Barack Obama's endorsement of same-sex marriage"	1:35
6.	"Bristol Palin's face work"	1:30
7.	"The Housewives of OC and "Jesus Barbie""	3:00
8.	"Protest by the Westboro Baptist Church"	6:10
9.	"The "New" Oprah and OWN"	5:50
10.	"Demi Moore and whippets"	2:20
11.	""Sizzurp" and T.I."	1:30
12.	"Cher's Twitter account"	2:50
13.	"The Grammies and stealing Eric Church's seat"	8:50
14.	"Reading a prisoner's fan letter"	3:55
Total length:		43:55

== Personnel ==
Technical and production

- Kathy Griffin - executive producer
- Jenn Levy - executive producer
- Paul Miller - executive producer
- Kimber Rickabaugh - executive producer
- Jeff U'ren - film editor
- Bruce Ryan - production designer
- Cisco Henson - executive in charge of production
- Lesley Maynard - production supervisor
- David Crivelli - technical supervisor
- Gene Crowe - stage manager, associate director

Visuals and imagery

- Ashlee Mullen - make-up artist
- Charles Baker Strahan - hair stylist
- Alan Adelman - lighting designer

== Award and nominations ==
The live Bravo performance special was nominated for the Grammy for Best Comedy Album in the 55th Grammy Awards.
