= Pants Off =

Live album by Kathy Griffin
- Released: August 7, 2012
- Recorded: September 20, 2011
- Genre: Comedy
- Length: 43:57
- Label: Shout! Factory
- Producer: Kathy Griffin

Kathy Griffin chronology
Gurrl Down (2011)	Pants Off (2012)	Tired Hooker (2011)

Pants Off is the third home video release and thirteenth Bravo stand-up comedy special by stand-up comedian Kathy Griffin and her fifteenth overall. It was televised live from the Segerstrom Center for the Arts in Costa Mesa, California on September 20, 2011, on Bravo. It was released simultaneously with Tired Hooker. It was originally titled "Kathy Griffin: Pray The Gay Back".

== Track listing ==
No.	Title	Length
1.	"A message from Maggie Griffin"	2:00
2.	"Kim Kardashian's wedding"	8:00
3.	"Casey Anthony and Nancy Grace"	5:00
4.	"Marcus Bachmann"	5:00
5.	"The Real Housewives of New Jersey and Orange County"	4:00
6.	"Performing in prison"	5:00
7.	"The 2011 Virginia Earthquake"	1:00
8.	"Dinner with Gloria Steinem"	4:00
9.	"Pot brownies"	6:00
10.	"House-sitting for Anderson Cooper"	3:57
Total length:		43:57

== Personnel ==
Technical and production

- Kathy Griffin - executive producer
- Paul Miller - executive producer
- Kimber Rickabaugh - executive producer

Visuals and imagery

- Ashlee Mullen - makeup artist
