= Tired Hooker =

Live album by Kathy Griffin
- Released: August 7, 2012
- Recorded: December 20, 2011
- Genre: Comedy
- Length: 43:57
- Label: Shout! Factory
- Producer: Kathy Griffin

Kathy Griffin chronology
Pants Off (2011)	Tired Hooker (2012)	Seaman 1st Class (2012)

Tired Hooker is third home video release and the fourteenth Bravo stand-up comedy special by stand-up comedian Kathy Griffin and sixteenth overall. It was recorded at Borgata Hotel in Atlantic City, New Jersey and aired on December 20, 2011, on Bravo. It was released simultaneously with Pants Off.

== Track listing ==
No.	Title	Length
1.	"Introduction"	1:10
2.	"Kim Kardashian's marriage to Chris Humphries"	7:50
3.	"Ashton Kutcher's divorce"	2:00
4.	"Beaver Hunt in Hustler and getting waxe"	4:00
5.	"Hugh Jackman's Broadway show"	3:55
6.	"Nancy Grace on Dancing with the Stars"	4:50
7.	"Grindr"	4:15
8.	"Dating and her dogs"	3:00
9.	"Lindsay Lohan's community service"	1:00
10.	"Pajama jeans, forever lazies, and furries"	8:00
11.	"Cher"	3:57
Total length:		43:57

== Personnel ==
Technical and production

- Andy Cohen - executive producer (as Andrew Cohen)
- Kathy Griffin - executive producer
- Jenn Levy - executive producer
- Paul Miller - executive producer
- Kimber Rickabaugh - executive producer
- Jeff U'ren - film editor
- Bruce Ryan - production design
- Cisco Henson - executive in charge of production
- Lesley Maynard - production supervisor
- Gene Crowe - associate director
- Alan Adelman - lighting designer
- David Crivelli - technical supervisor
- Gene Crowe - stage manager
- Danielle Iacovelli - production assistant (uncredited)

Visuals and imagery

- Ashlee Mullen - hair stylist / makeup artist
- Erica Courtney - jewelry
