= Kathy (talk show) =

- Genre: Comedy
- Directed by: Lenn Goodside
- Presented by: Kathy Griffin
- Starring: Kathy Griffin; Maggie Griffin; Tiffany Rinehart; Michelle Collins; Meredith Morris
- Theme music composer: Adam Schlesinger
- Opening theme: "I'll Say It" (season 1) "I'll Say It" (Remix)
- Ending theme: "I'll Say It" (season 1) "I'll Say It" (instrumental) (season 2)
- Country of origin: United States
- Original language: English
- No. of seasons: 2
- No. of episodes: 24

Production
- Executive producers: Michael Davies; Kathy Griffin; Eli Lehrer; Jenn Levy
- Producers: Eric Leiderman; Kay O'Connell; Michelle Collins; Ken Daly; Marshall Heyman
- Production location: East Hollywood, Los Angeles
- Editors: Kurt Heydle; Matt Silfen
- Camera setup: Multi-camera
- Running time: 44 minutes
- Production companies: Donut Run, Inc; Embassy Row; Sony Pictures Television; Bravo Originals

Original release
- Network: Bravo
- Release: April 19, 2012 – March 28, 2013

Kathy is an American late-night talk show hosted by Kathy Griffin. The show debuted on April 19, 2012, at 10:00 p.m. on Bravo and aired every Thursday. The show was renewed for a second season, which started airing on January 10, 2013 as started to air Live at 10:00 p.m. on Bravo, which was later changed to 11:30 p.m. in mid-season.

On April 6, 2013, Bravo announced the cancellation of Kathy after two seasons.

== Format ==
The show relies on Kathy Griffin's stand-up in the first part of the program. Kathy's mother Maggie Griffin, and Kathy's assistant Tiffany Rinehart, both seated in the front row of the audience, are then introduced. The main parts of the show feature a panel of "civilians" (random people, staff, or friends) and sometimes celebrities, chatting about hot issues of the week. The next part of the show is a pre-recorded segment involving comedic antics Kathy has done during the week. Finally, Maggie gives her opinions on topics and the night's events in a segment called "Maggie Tucks Us In".

In season 2, the set of the show was re-decorated. It was revealed that the studio of the show, Studio 58, used to be the studio of The Late Late Show with Craig Ferguson before it moved to Studio 56. Also, the panelists consist mostly of celebrities rather than "civilians". The segment "Maggie Tucks Us In" has been cut; however, Maggie Griffin, along with Rinehart is still seated in the audience each episode and Kathy would occasionally chat with them.

== Episodes ==
=== Series overview ===
Season	Episodes	Original airing	
Season	Episodes	Season premiere	Season finale
1	12	April 19, 2012	July 5, 2012
2	12	January 10, 2013	March 28, 2013

=== Season 1 (2012) ===
No.	Original Airdate	Guest Panelists	Additional Guest Panelists	Topics Discussed	Special Segment	Musical Guests	Notes
1	April 19, 2012	Michelle Collins, Meredith Morris, Greg Howell	Kathy staff: John Oliveira, Cole Bruns, Kristen Rae Urban, Mina Ross	Real Housewives of Atlanta, Secret Service scandal, Brad Pitt & Angelina Jolie, Janet Jackson's Weight Loss, Tupac Hologram, Wilson Phillips: Still Holding On, Couples Therapy, The Real Housewives of Orange County	"The Real Staff of Kathy Reunion"	None	
2	April 26, 2012	Teresa Strasser, Lisa Delcampo, Ryan Steckloff	East Hollywood residents: Steven Whiddon, Paulina Mercado, Nick Rizzo	Keeping Up with the Kardashians, Khloé & Lamar, John Edwards trial, Lindsay Lohan, Cesar Millan's divorce, Simon Cowell's unauthorized biography, Wilson Phillips: Still Holding On, The Client List, Don't Be Tardy for the Wedding	"Greetings from East Hollywood, CA"	None	Lance Bass makes a brief appearance
3	May 3, 2012	Michelle Collins, Jodi Shays, Marshall Heyman	Wilson Phillips	White House Correspondents Dinner, Celebrity Vow Renewals, Secret Service scandal, Jessica Simpson's baby, Gloria Steinem and The New Feminists, Lifetime's 7 Days of Sex, Bethenny Ever After, Wilson Phillips: Still Holding On	New opening credits or "hero shots" for the Kathy show	Wilson Phillips	
4	May 10, 2012	Mike Russo, Sara Zofko, Chelsea Peretti	None	John Travolta rumors, Obama supports gay marriage, Wedding mania, Celebrity divorces, Bristol Palin: Life's a Tripp Kathy's dinner with Gloria Estefan, The Celebrity Apprentice 5, Toddlers & Tiaras	Kathy babysits Blake Webster's children	None	
5	May 17, 2012	Jill Benjamin, Meredith Morris, Katie Robbins	Firefighters: Alex Abdalla, David Hay, Wayne Tinsley	The X Factor's new judges, Fifty Shades of Grey, Judy Blume, Obama and Hasselbeck on The View, Cher vs Donald Trump, Mel Gibson at a Victoria's Secret party, Alexis from The Real Housewives of Orange County, Toddlers & Tiaras	"Aging America" focus group	None	Kathy's Twitter fans: Danny Van Hook, Jacki Bray, Josiah Tubbs (panel appeared after special segment)
6	May 24, 2012	Todd Glass, Claire Griffin, Marshall Heyman	Here Come the Brides: Catie Galich, Kristian Goodman, Amber Revelle	Miley Cyrus, Kim Zolciak's side-boob, Wayne the Firefighter and Tiffany, Keeping Up with the Kardashians, The FiFi Awards, Jenna Talackova and Miss Universe Canada, Bachelorette parties, Don't Be Tardy for the Wedding, My Fair Wedding with David Tutera	The "new" Lifetime line-up	None	Byrd from Judge Judy makes a brief appearance
7	May 31, 2012	Michelle Collins, Randy Sklar, Jason Sklar	Hot Marines: James Bick, C.J. Guitron, Phil Jaquet	Mrs. Eastwood & Company, Britney Spears on The X Factor, Gay bar bans bachelorette parties, Polygamy and Sister Wives, The Real Housewives of Orange County, Mob Wives Chicago	Kathy confronts her staff about their Facebook photos	Space Cops (a.k.a. Cole Bruns)	
8	June 7, 2012	Chelsea Handler, Whitney Cummings, Ryan Steckloff	None	Inappropriate things to say, Chelsea's knee surgery, Whip-its, Equality for women in comedy, Liposuction, Miley Cyrus' engagement, Colonics, Ryan's mugshot and job, Tanisha Gets Married, My Big Fat American Gypsy Wedding	Kathy works at Donut Prince	None	Cole Bruns (a.k.a. Space Cops) joins Maggie on the couch for "Maggie Tucks Us In"
9	June 14, 2012	Robert Verdi, Michelle Buteau, Ralph Garman	AJ McLean, Lance Bass	Celebrity nipples, Wardrobe malfunctions, Fashion, Gay Pride Month, Madonna seeking attention, Dance Moms, On the Fly, Monster In-Laws	Kathy reminisces with A.J. and Lance	Kathy, A.J. and Lance sing a cappella	Lance and A.J. join Kathy for the "Tuck us in" segment
10	June 21, 2012	Anderson Cooper, Michelle Collins, Meredith Morris	None	People's reactions to Anderson, Kathy's visit to Anderson's house, Anderson's confrontation on a flight, Anderson's mom Gloria Vanderbilt, Alec Baldwin vs Paparazzi, Extremely overpriced face cream, Inappropriateness on airplanes Bridezillas, The Glass House, Noisey: Back and Forth from YouTube	"Kathy's Dating Game"	None	Anderson joins Maggie for "Maggie Tucks Us In"
11	June 28, 2012	Jane Fonda, Sharon Osbourne, Lisa Ling	None	How Jane and Sharon first met, The "celebrity building", Kathy's visit to Jane's house, Jack Osbourne being diagnosed with MS, Food issues, Celebrity protesters, ShowBiz Dynasties, Keeping Up with the Kardashians, The state of marriage, Women's sexual peak, Too old to care	"Maggie's 92nd Birthday Rager"	None	
12	July 5, 2012	Jimmy Kimmel 3rd segment: Gail Hunt, Deanna Spinale, Jessica Hill	"Gay" segment: Nick Rizzo, John Oliveira	Jimmy's pact with Howard Stern, Jimmy's experience with Oprah Winfrey, Jimmy dressed as a "penis", Gaydars, Gay icons, Circuit parties, Gay cruises, Guess the gay, Guilty pleasures, Celebrity exhaustion, Online dating	"Staff Beer Fest"	None	

=== Season 2 (2013) ===
No.	Original Airdate	Guest Panelists	Additional Guest Panelists	Topics Discussed	Special Segment	Musical Guests	Notes
1	January 10, 2013	Jane Lynch, Lisa Kudrow	None		"Kathy Welcomes Her New Fish"	None	Liza Minnelli was scheduled as the third panelist, but did not attend.
2	January 17, 2013	T.I., Meredith Morris, Ryan Steckloff	None	Millionaire Matchmaker, Golden Globe parties, bumping into Mel Gibson, Miss America 2013, T.I. and Tiny: The Family Hustle	"Shocking Psychic Revelations"	None	Tameka Cottle (wife of T.I.) made a brief appearance.
3	January 24, 2013	Chelsea Handler, Chris Noth	None	Censoring Kathy on Love You, Mean It with Whitney Cummings, Barack Obama's inauguration, Lance Armstrong's interview with Oprah Winfrey, Prosecuting Casey Anthony on Lifetime, Shahs of Sunset cast comparing themselves to Rosa Parks, Levi Johnston's alleged attack by wife, Catfish: The TV Show, Paris Hilton on Real Housewives of Beverly Hills, rummaging through an audience member's purse	"Sell Kathy Your Stuff"	None	
4	January 31, 2013	Chris Colfer, Kelly Osbourne, Lisa Ling	None	Super Bowl XLVIII, diet secrets, Kesha interview on MTV, Tyler Perry's birthday gift to Oprah, Sharon Osbourne burning house, Chris Brown fighting Frank Ocean, Teen Mom 2, Toddlers & Tiaras, audience makeunders	"52 and Pregnant"	None	Jeremy Irons was announced as a guest, but was replaced by Colfer.
5	February 7, 2013	Larry King, Craig Ferguson	None	Shahs of Sunset, 2013 Grammy Awards, Katie Couric, Chris Christie, Donald Trump suing Bill Maher, Chris Brown, Real Housewives of Atlanta, Double Divas, recording outgoing messages on audience member's voicemails	None	YLA	
6	February 14, 2013	Russell Brand, ASAP Rocky, Danny Brown	None	2013 Grammy Awards, lyrics to ASAP Rocky's songs, guests' opinions on having children, Fashion Week, gay marriages, crazy places to have oral sex, Westminster Kennel Club Dog Show, Sex Dice Game	"Kathy and Maggie Visit the Pleasure Chest"	None	
7	February 21, 2013	Kate Walsh, Steven Weber, Aubrey Plaza	None	85th Academy Awards, Kathy's Grammy Awards giftbag, prison fan art, piercing Aubrey's ear live, Shahs of Sunset, Pit Bulls & Parolees	"Kathy's Kompassionate Kanines"	None	
8	February 28, 2013	Margaret Cho, Johnny Weir, Carmen Electra	None	Celebrity financials, Suzanne Somers' 92-acres of land, Carmen hosting The White Party, Andy Dick competing on Dancing with the Stars, Dennis Rodman and Kim Jong-Un, the feud between Bethenny Frankel and Johnny stemming from Skating with the Stars, Maury, audience dance contest	"Teamwork Among the Staff"	None	Suze Orman briefly appeared during the celebrity financials segment.
9	March 7, 2013	Jaime Pressly, Pauley Perrette, Kunal Nayyar	None	Celebrity impressions of major news stories, the Jodi Arias trial, discussion of her guests' TV shows, Taylor Swift, Russell Crowe, Bar Rescue, odd sexual positions, and a blind-folded touching game.			
10	March 14, 2013	Megan Mullally, Nick Offerman, Michelle Trachtenberg	None	A lie detector test for Maggie Griffin, Kathy Griffin's parody of Law and Order: SVU, celebrity airport questions, Kris Jenner, the dating lives of her guests, Preachers' Daughters, Bar Rescue, Lizard Lick Towing, answering some tweets, and Kathy responding to lie detector tests			
11	March 21, 2013	Jesse Tyler Ferguson, Darren Criss, Lily Tomlin	None	Ryan Seacrest's break-up with Julianne Hough, discussion of Jodi Arias, the conclusion to Kathy Griffin's parody of Law and Order: SVU, the guests' discussion each of their own shows, Lily Tomlin at Studio 54, the rainbow house near the Westboro Baptist Church, Girls and Lena Dunham, other D-list celebrities, Urban Tarzan, and the searching through the audience members' bags			
12	March 28, 2013	Eva Longoria, Kristin Chenoweth, Josh Groban	None	Nancy Grace responding to Kathy's impression and asking Kathy some questions, stealing Kristin Chenoweth's bike to bring to the show, sucking the helium from balloons and explaining pictures, getting Barbra Streisand to sit at Kathy's table during a party, poking her crew with a dildo, Urban Tarzan, and renewal of a gay couples' wedding vows.			

== See also ==
- Kathy Griffin: My Life on the D-List
- List of Kathy Griffin stand-up specials
- List of late-night American network TV programs
- List of programs broadcast by Bravo
