= Whores on Crutches =

Live album by Kathy Griffin
- Released: October 30, 2012
- Recorded: November 2, 2010
- Genre: Comedy
- Length: 43:54
- Label: Shout! Factory
- Producer: Kathy Griffin

Kathy Griffin chronology
Does the Bible Belt (2010)	Whores on Crutches (2012)	50 and Not Pregnant (2011)

Whores on Crutches is the tenth Bravo stand-up comedy special by stand-up comedian Kathy Griffin and twelfth overall. It was televised live from the Pechanga Resort and Casino in Temecula, California on November 2, 2010, on Bravo and released on October 30, 2012, on Bravo as a part of The Kathy Griffin Collection: Red, White & Raw. It was originally called Diva in a Tipi.

== Track listing ==
No.	Title	Length
1.	"Introduction"	0:00
2.	"Bristol Palin"	1:30
3.	"Elizabeth Hasselbeck on the View"	8:00
4.	"Nickel slots and the casino"	0:55
5.	"Paris Hilton's arrest"	3:00
6.	"Tiger Woods"	3:20
7.	"The OCD Project, My Kid Ate What?, I Didn't Know I Was Pregnant"	11:40
8.	"Maggie Griffin on Jimmy Kimmel and Larry King Live"	9:00
9.	"Real Housewives of New Jersey"	3:54
Total length:		43:54

== Personnel ==
Technical and production

- Andrew Cohen - executive producer
- Kathy Griffin - executive producer
- Jenn Levy - executive producer
- Paul Miller - executive producer
- Kimber Rickabaugh - executive producer
- David Neal Stewart - Cinematography
- Jeff U'ren - film editor
- Bruce Ryan - production design
- Cisco Henson - executive in charge of production
- Kris Sheets - production supervisor
- Gene Crowe - associate director, stage manager
- Dave Bell - production assistant
- Jeremy Katz - production assistant
- James Lovewell - production assistant
- Tiffany Luard - production assistant

Visuals and imagery

- Adam Christopher - makeup artist
- Ashlee Mullen - hair stylist
- Josh Morton - sound re-recording mixer
- Simon Miles - lighting designer
- Peter Flaherty - wardrobe
