= Does the Bible Belt =

Live album by Kathy Griffin
- Released: August 9, 2010
- Recorded: June 8, 2010
- Genre: Comedy
- Length: 44:50
- Label: Universal Network Television LLC
- Producer: Kathy Griffin

Kathy Griffin chronology
Suckin' It for the Holidays (2009)	Does the Bible Belt (2010)	Whores on Crutches (2011)

Does the Bible Belt is the third album and ninth Bravo stand-up comedy special by stand-up comedian Kathy Griffin, and eleventh special overall. It was televised live from the Tennessee Theatre in Knoxville, Tennessee on June 8, 2010, on Bravo. It was also re-released on October 30, 2012. as part of The Kathy Griffin Collection: Red, White & Raw.

== Track listing ==
No.	Title	Length
1.	"Protest in Nashville"	1:40
2.	"The Waffle House"	1:55
3.	"Dancing with the Stars Season 10"	4:05
4.	"Las Vegas with Renée Zellweger and Liza Minnelli"	6:10
5.	"Her episode of Law and Order: SVU"	6:15
6.	"Hoarders"	7:55
7.	"Ryan Secrest"	1:00
8.	"Dinner Party with Sharon Stone"	9:25
9.	"Oprah's weight gain and the Texas State Fair"	4:55
Total length:		44:50

== Personnel ==
Technical and production

- Cori Abraham - executive producer
- Andy Cohen - executive producer
- Kathy Griffin - executive producer
- Jenn Levy - executive producer
- Paul Miller - executive producer
- Kimber Rickabaugh - executive producer
- David W. Foster - film editor
- Cisco Henson - executive in charge of production
- Josh Jackson - production supervisor, script supervisor
- Lesley Maynard - production supervisor
- Gene Crowe - associate director, stage manager
- Dave Bell - production assistant
- Chris Keyes - production assistant
- David Layne - production assistant
- Niles Maddox - production assistant
- Jordan Nefouse - assistant production coordinator

Visuals and imagery

- Jennifer Montoya - hair stylist, make-up artist
- Ashlee Mullen - make-up artist
- Paul Lennon - lighting director
- Simon Miles - lighting designer

== Award and nominations ==
The live Bravo performance special was nominated for the Grammy for Best Comedy Album in the 53rd Grammy Awards.
