= Bristol Palin: Life's a Tripp =

American reality television series

- Genre: Reality
- Starring: Bristol Palin
- Country of origin: United States
- Original language: English
- No. of seasons: 1
- No. of episodes: 14

Production
- Executive producers: David Martin; David McKenzie; Gena McCarthy; Jim Romanovich; Matt Lutz; Noah Pollack; Rob Sharenow; Robyn Schnieders
- Running time: 22 minutes
- Production company: Associated Television International

Original release
- Network: Lifetime
- Release: June 19 – July 31, 2012

Bristol Palin: Life's a Tripp is an American reality television series that premiered on Lifetime. The series, featuring Bristol Palin, debuted on June 19, 2012.

== Premise ==
The series follows the day-to-day life of Bristol Palin as she adjusts to life in Alaska after temporarily residing in California.

== Episodes ==
No.	Title	Original release date	US viewers (millions)
1	"Spreading My Wings"	June 19, 2012	0.726
2	"From Bad to Worse"	June 19, 2012	0.726
3	"Bristol, a Book, and the Beach"	June 26, 2012	0.586
4	"Baby Daddy Dilemma (FKA The Levi Blues. Back in Alaska)"	June 26, 2012	0.426
5	"Ms. Palin Goes to Washington"	July 3, 2012	N/A
6	"Sarah's Surprise"	July 3, 2012	N/A
7	"Valen-Times"	July 10, 2012	N/A
8	"Reindeer Games"	July 10, 2012	N/A
9	"Cabin Fever"	July 17, 2012	N/A
10	"New Beginnings"	July 17, 2012	N/A
11	"Bearizona"	July 24, 2012	N/A
12	"Kicked to the Curb"	July 24, 2012	N/A
13	"The Bet (Mom's the Word)"	July 31, 2012	N/A
14	"The Ring Bear-er"	July 31, 2012	N/A

== Reception ==
The pilot episode of Palin's series had an estimated 726,000 viewers, with a rating of 0.2 percent among adults aged 18–49. After performing even worse the second week, Lifetime decided to move the show from its original primetime slot, at 10:00 p.m., to an hour later, and to show repeats of the series Dance Moms at 10:00 p.m.

Palin's series has received mostly negative reviews, with Entertainment Weekly calling it a "weird, miserable reality show." San Francisco Chronicle's David Wiegand said, "She's just not that interesting." Time's James Poniewozik has called the show "misguided" and commented that it fails to show Palin as a struggling young mother as she is seen at boutiques, Starbucks, and at bars. The Washington Post's Hank Stuever said everything in Palin's show "reeks of reality TV tropes: The massive SUVs Bristol cruises around in, the insipid boutiques where she shops, her Beverly Hills mansion that looks like a Bachelorette set, the blatantly staged conversations, the annoyingly visible microphone packs." He then called the show "maddeningly unreal."

== Lawsuits ==
Prior to the show's airing, it had already been the subject of lawsuits. In September 2011, Palin was heckled by Stephen Hanks in a West Hollywood bar while being filmed for the show. When footage of the heated argument was shown on the show's advertisements, Hanks sued Palin for defamation saying he never signed any permission waiver to be shown on television.
