= Gurrl Down =

- Genre: Stand-up special
- Starring: Kathy Griffin

Production
- Production location: Wilbur Theatre
- Running time: 43:25

Original release
- Network: Bravo
- Release: October 30, 2012

Gurrl Down is the twelfth Bravo stand-up comedy special by stand-up comedian Kathy Griffin and fourteenth overall. It was televised live from the Wilbur Theatre in Boston, Massachusetts and released on October 30, 2012, on Bravo as a part of The Kathy Griffin Collection: Red, White & Raw.

== Track listing ==
No.	Title	Length
1.	"Introduction"	1:00
2.	"Sarah Palin's family"	5:00
3.	"Visiting MIT"	5:00
4.	"Running into Michele Bachmann"	7:00
5.	"New Year's Eve in Times Square with Anderson Cooper"	2:00
6.	"My Strange Addiction"	6:00
7.	"Phaedra from The Real Housewives of Atlanta"	8:00
8.	"Bill O'Reilly backstage on Glee"	5:35
9.	"Lady Gaga's parents and deaf interpreters"	3:00
Total length:		43:25

== Personnel ==
Technical and production

- Andy Cohen - executive producer (as Andrew Cohen)
- Kathy Griffin - executive producer
- Jenn Levy - executive producer
- Paul Miller - executive producer
- Kimber Rickabaugh - executive producer
- Jeff U'ren - production design
- Bruce Ryan - production design
- Gene Crowe - associate director, stage manager
- Lesley Maynard - production supervisor
- Cisco Henson - executive in charge of production
- Dave Bell - production assistant
- Lindsay Eberly - production assistant
- Danielle Iacovelli - production assistant
- Steven H. Kaplan - production assistant
- James Lovewell - production assistant
- Jonathan White - production assistant

Visuals and imagery

- Ashlee Mullen - hair stylist / makeup artist
- Tad Davis - audio assist
- Paul Lennon - lighting director
- Simon Miles - lighting designer
- Michael Mulvey - jib operator
