= Best Comedy Album =

Best Comedy Album may refer to:

- Grammy Award for Best Comedy Album
- Juno Award for Comedy Album of the Year
- Canadian Comedy Award for Best Comedy Album
- New Music Award for Best Comedy Album
- Nā Hōkū Hanohano Award for Best Comedy Album
- ARIA Music Award for Best Comedy Album
- Félix Award for Best Comedy Album
- Cecil Award for Best Comedy Album
- Punjabi Music Awards for Best Comedy Album
- Vancouver Comedy Award for Best Comedy Album
