= List of awards and nominations received by Richard Pryor =

Richard Pryor awards and nominations
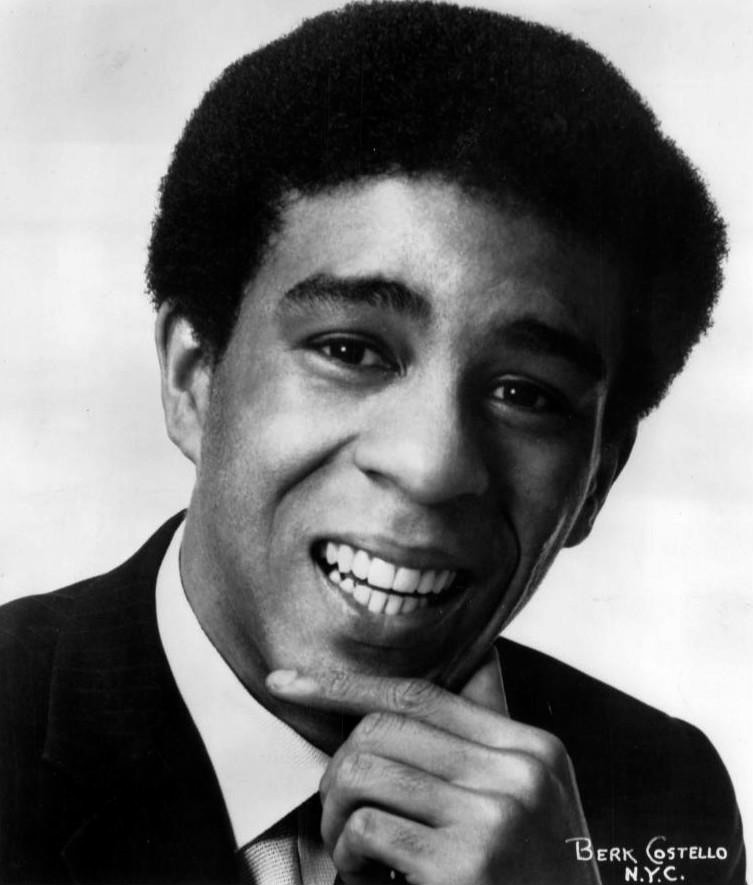
Awards and nominations
Award	Wins	Nominations
Grammy	5	10
Emmy Awards	1	5

Richard Pryor was an American comedian, writer and actor.

Pryor is considered one of the greatest standup comedians of all time.

Over his career Pryor received five Primetime Emmy Award nominations winning for Outstanding Writing for a Variety Special for Lily in 1974. He also received ten Grammy Award for Best Comedy Album nominations winning five times for That Nigger's Crazy (1973), ...Is It Something I Said? (1974), Bicentennial Nigger (1975), and Rev. Du Rite (1982), Richard Pryor: Live on the Sunset Strip (1983). In 2006 he received the Grammy Lifetime Achievement Award. In 1998 he became the first Mark Twain Prize for American Humor honoree presented to him at the Kennedy Center. He won the Writers Guild of America Award in 1974 for Blazing Saddles. He was listed at number one on Comedy Central's list of all-time greatest stand-up comedians. In 2017, Rolling Stone ranked him first on its list of the 50 best stand-up comics of all time.

== Major associations ==
=== Emmy Awards ===
Year	Category	Nominated work	Result	Ref.
Primetime Emmy Awards
1973	Outstanding Writing for a Variety Special	The Lily Tomlin Show	Nominated	
1974	Outstanding Writing for a Variety Special	Lily	Won	
1983	Outstanding Individual Performance in a Variety Program	Motown 25: Yesterday, Today, Forever	Nominated	
1996	Outstanding Guest Actor in a Drama Series	Chicago Hope	Nominated	
Daytime Emmy Awards
1985	Outstanding Performer in a Children's Programming	Pryor's Place	Nominated	

=== Grammy Awards ===
Year	Category	Nominated work	Result	Ref.
1975	Best Comedy Album	That Nigger's Crazy	Won	
1976	Best Comedy Album	...Is It Something I Said?	Won	
1977	Best Comedy Album	Bicentennial Nigger	Won	
1978	Best Comedy Album	Are You Serious???	Nominated	
1979	Best Comedy Album	The Wizard of Comedy	Nominated	
1980	Best Comedy Album	Wanted: Live in Concert	Nominated	
1981	Best Comedy Album	Holy Smoke	Nominated	
1982	Best Comedy Album	Rev. Du Rite	Won	
1983	Best Comedy Album	Richard Pryor: Live on the Sunset Strip	Won	
1985	Best Comedy Album	Richard Pryor: Here and Now	Nominated	
2006	Lifetime Achievement Award		Received	

== Industry awards ==
=== BAFTA Awards ===
Year	Category	Nominated work	Result	Ref.
1974	Best Screenplay	Blazing Saddles	Nominated	

=== National Society of Film Critics ===
Year	Category	Nominated work	Result	Ref.
1979	Best Actor	Richard Pryor: Live in Concert	Won	

=== New York Film Critics Circle ===
Year	Category	Nominated work	Result	Ref.
1976	Best Supporting Actor	Silver Streak	Nominated	

=== Writers Guild of America Awards ===
Year	Category	Nominated work	Result	Ref.
1973	Best Written Variety Script	Lily	Nominated	
1974	Best Original Screenplay	Blazing Saddles	Won	

== Honorary awards ==
- 1993 - Star on the Hollywood Walk of Fame
- 1993 - American Comedy Awards Lifetime Achievement Awards
- 1997 - New York Comedy Festival Lifetime Achievement Award
- 1998 - Mark Twain Prize for American Humor
