= The Anthology (1968–1992) =

Compilation album by Richard Pryor
- Released: 2002
- Recorded: September 1968 to October 17, 1992
- Genre: Comedy
- Length: 2:36:29
- Label: Warner Archives/Rhino
- Producer: Robert Marchese; Richard Pryor; David Banks; Biff Dawes

Richard Pryor chronology
...And It's Deep Too! The Complete Warner Bros. Recordings (1968–1992) (2000)	The Anthology (1968–1992) (2002)	Evolution/Revolution: The Early Years (1966–1974) (2005)

The Anthology (1968–1992) is a two-CD compilation distilling the best tracks from American comedian Richard Pryor's seven albums he recorded and/or released on Warner Bros. Records or its subsidiary Reprise, and is essentially the digest version of his 2000 nine-CD box set ...And It's Deep Too! The Complete Warner Bros. Recordings (1968–1992). Pryor and his wife/manager Jennifer Lee Pryor assisted in and authorized the compilation, which was produced by the same team responsible for the ...And It's Deep Too box set, Reggie Collins and Steve Pokorny.

== Track listing ==
=== Disc one ===
1. "Super Nigger" – 3:15
2. "Prison Play" – 9:10
3. "Nigger With A Seizure" – 5:24
4. "Have Your Ass Home By 11:00" – 2:30
5. "Black And White Life Styles" – 3:42
6. "Exorcist" – 1:53
7. "Niggers Vs. The Police" – 1:41
8. "Wino Dealing With Dracula" – 2:06
9. "Wino And Junkie" – 7:05
10. "Mudbone - Intro" – 5:42
11. "Mudbone - Little Feets" – 11:45
12. "When Your Woman Leaves You" – 6:27
13. "Cocaine" – 4:08
14. "Acid" – 4:53
15. "Bicentennial Prayer" – 6:39
16. "Bicentennial Nigger" – 2:24

=== Disc two ===
1. "New Year's Eve" – 3:50
2. "Discipline" – 7:57
3. "Heart Attacks" – 8:09
4. "Monkeys" – 4:04
5. "Being Sensitive" – 7:53
6. "Africa" – 10:30
7. "Freebase" – 8:12
8. "Hospital" – 10:14
9. "I Like Women" – 6:20
10. "M.S." – 10:36

== Track origins ==
- Disc One, Tracks 1–2:

From the album Richard Pryor, Dove/Reprise #RS-6325 (released November 1968)

Produced by Robert Marchese
Engineered by Ron Johnson
Recorded live at The Troubadour, West Hollywood, CA (September 1968)

- Disc One, Tracks 3–9:

From the album That Nigger's Crazy, Partee/Stax #2404 (released May 1974); Reissued as Reprise #MS-2241 (November 10, 1975)

Produced by Richard Pryor
Recorded by Haji Sound Recording Co., Los Angeles, CA
Recorded live at Don Cornelius' Soul Train, early 1974

- Disc One, Tracks 10–13:

From the album ...Is It Something I Said?, Reprise #MS-2227 (released July 25, 1975)

Produced by David Banks
Engineered by Biff Dawes
Edited and Remixed by Rudy Hill
Recorded live at the Latin Casino, Cherry Hill, NJ, May 26, 1975

- Disc One, Tracks 14–16:

From the album Bicentennial Nigger, Warner Bros. Records #BSK-2960 (released September 10, 1976)

Produced by David Banks
Engineered by Biff Dawes
Recorded live at The Comedy Store, Hollywood, CA, February 1976 and The Roxy Theatre, West Hollywood, CA, July 1976

- Disc Two, Tracks 1–5:

From the album Wanted/Richard Pryor - Live In Concert, Warner Bros. Records #2BSK-3364 (released November 17, 1978)

Produced by Richard Pryor and Biff Dawes
Engineered by Biff Dawes
Recorded live at John F. Kennedy Center for the Performing Arts, Washington, DC, City Center of Music and Drama, New York City, and Auditorium Theatre, Chicago, IL with the Wally Heider Remote.

- Disc Two, Tracks 6–8:

From the album Richard Pryor: Live on the Sunset Strip, Warner Bros. Records #BSK-3660 (released March 24, 1982).

Produced by Richard Pryor and Biff Dawes
Engineered by Biff Dawes and Jack Crymes
Recorded live at Circle Star Theater, San Carlos, CA, October 1981 and December 1981 with the Record Plant Mobile Studios, Los Angeles, CA.

- Disc Two, Track 9:

From the album Here And Now, Warner Bros. Records #23981 (released October 12, 1983)

Produced by David Banks
Engineered by Jeff Dodge
Re-Edited by Rudy Hill
Recorded live at The Saenger Theatre, New Orleans, LA, August 9, 1983
Edited at The L.A. Studios, Los Angeles, CA

- Disc Two, Track 10:

First issued on That African-American's Still Crazy: Good Shit From The Vaults, the CD of unreleased material included on the box set ...And It's Deep Too! The Complete Warner Bros. Recordings (1968–1992), Warner Archives/Rhino #76655 (released October 17, 2000).

No producer credit given
Edited by Dan Hersch, Reggie Collins and Steve Pokorny.
Recorded live at Circle Star Theater, San Carlos, CA, October 1992.

== Personnel ==
- Richard Pryor - performer, spoken word, writer, "assistance and cooperation"
- Jennifer Lee Pryor - "assistance and cooperation"
- Reggie Collins - compilation producer, discographical annotation
- Steve Pokorny - compilation producer
- Pat Kraus – Remastering
- Mike Engstrom - product manager
- Jo Motta - project coordination
- Gary Peterson - discographical annotation
- Shawn Amos - liner notes coordination
- Julee Stover - editorial supervision
- Cory Frye - editorial supervision
- Maria Villar - art direction
- Maria DeGrassi-Colosimo - design
- Henry Diltz - cover photo, inside photos
- Bruce W. Talamon - back cover photo, inside photos
- Michael Ochs Archives - inside photos
- Globe Photos - inside photos
- NBC - inside photos
- Photofest - inside photos
- Patrick Milligan - project assistance
- Quincy Newell - project assistance
- Amy Utstein - project assistance
- Randy Perry - project assistance
