= L.A. Jail =

Live album by Richard Pryor
- Released: 1976
- Venue: P.J.'s, West Hollywood
- Genre: Stand-up comedy
- Length: 33:54
- Label: Tiger Lily
- Producer: Black Rain Music

Richard Pryor chronology
...Is It Something I Said? (1975)	L.A. Jail (1976)	Bicentennial Nigger (1976)

L.A. Jail is the seventh album by American comedian Richard Pryor, allegedly recorded live at P.J.'s in West Hollywood, California and released in 1976.

== Album's release and Pryor’s authorization ==
Although this album was not released until 1976 it was probably made during Pryor’s "transitional period"—i.e. after 1967 when he walked off the stage at the Aladdin Hotel in Las Vegas but before he recorded the 1974 LP, That Nigger's Crazy. This is suggested both by the tone and content of the material as well as by the information available about this recording in the Goldmine Comedy Record Price Guide.

Sonically this album is uniformly consistent. There are no significant changes in the character of Pryor’s voice, the level of the volume, or the general sounds of the audience. On several different tracks there are problems with noises and distortion from the microphone which are all acoustically similar to each other. All of this suggests that the master tapes for this album were recorded during one set of performances with the same recording set up, the same engineer, and the same troublesome microphone. It is not, like some of Pryor’s unauthorized albums on Laff Records, made up of sonically inconsistent tracks obviously recorded at different performances and different points during his career.

Two of the tracks on this album are taken from one of Pryor’s previously released albums. Tracks #1 and #7, "Arrested" and "Black Jack," on this album are the same as Tracks #8 and #14, "Cops/Line Up" and "Black Jack," on the Craps (After Hours) album.

Since Craps is known to have been recorded at The Redd Foxx Club in Hollywood this calls into question the assertion of this album’s own notes which state that it was recorded at P.J.’s in Los Angeles. Many of these tracks appear later on the 2005 compilation album Evolution/Revolution: The Early Years (1966–1974) which does include detailed notes. According to the notes on Evolution/Revolution, the tracks on this album which also appear on Craps were recorded at The Redd Foxx Club in January 1971. Those notes from Evolution/Revolution, however, do not include any information concerning the dates or venues for the other tracks which appear on both Evolution/Revolution and L.A. Jail.

The usually reliable Goldmine Comedy Record Price Guide also claims that Pryor authorized the release of this album on Tiger Lily Records. As most sources such as Robert Plante claim, however, the releases on Tiger Lily were usually unauthorized--Tiger Lily being, in fact, a tax scam operated by Morris Levy, the Mafia connected head of Roulette Records. The fact that several of these tracks are copies of tracks which appeared on an album that Pryor had previously released also supports the notion that this album was not authorized.

== Connections to Evolution/Revolution ==
As stated earlier, in 2005, many of these tracks appeared on Pryor’s compilation album Evolution/Revolution. They are:

S1, T1 – "Arrested" – which appears on E/R as #30 – "The Line Up"

S1, T6 – "Bathrooms" – which appears on E/R as #16 – "Movie Stars In The Bathroom"

S2, T1 – "Black Jack" – which appears on E/R as #36 – "Blackjack"

S2, T2 "Groovy Feelings" – which appears on E/R as #12 – "I Feel"

S2, T4 "Chow Line" – which appears on E/R as #13 – "Jail"

== Connection to other Pryor material ==
Several of these tracks can also be connected with material Pryor will use on other albums.

"Farting Smells" includes material that is very similar to the tracks "Fartin’" from Craps (After Hours) and "Farting" from Richard Pryor.

"Funky People" is incredibly similar to "Smells" from Richard Pryor.

"2001" is an almost verbatim recreation of a scene from the film 2001: A Space Odyssey which Pryor will again recreate at the end of the track "Acid" from Bicentennial Nigger. This track may also help date this recording since Pryor claims that his reason for recreating this scene was because he had just seen the movie and he couldn’t stop thinking about it. Assuming he saw the film during its original release, that would date this performance to the spring or summer of 1968.

== Production notes ==
According to the liner notes, this album was produced by Black-Rain Music, released on Tiger Lily Records (catalog number TL 14023), and distributed by Roulette Records, with a copyright of 1976 by R.A.Inbows Ltd.

== Track listing ==
=== Side one ===
1. "Arrested"
2. "Brick Eight [sic]" ("Fight" should be in the title, instead of "Eight")
3. "State Park"
4. "Big Daddy"
5. "Hair"
6. "Bathrooms"

=== Side two ===
1. "Black Jack"
2. "Groovy Feelings"
3. "Funky People"
4. "Chow Line"
5. "Judgement Day"
6. "Chain Gang"
7. "2001"
8. "Farting Smells"
9. "Pimples"
10. "Country Singer"
