= Live at the Comedy Store, 1973 =

Stand-up comedy album by Richard Pryor

Live album by Richard Pryor
- Released: July 23, 2021
- Recorded: October 29–30, 1973
- Venue: The Comedy Store
- Genre: Comedy
- Label: Omnivore Records, Stand Up! Records
- Producer: Richard Pryor, Jennifer Lee Pryor, Reggie Collins, Cheryl Pawelski

Richard Pryor chronology
Here and Now (1983)	Live at the Comedy Store, 1973 (2021)

Live at the Comedy Store, 1973 is a concert album by comedian Richard Pryor.

== History ==
The material on Live At The Comedy Store, like his early-1970s albums Richard Pryor and Craps (After Hours), captures Pryor during his most transformative period as a comic, when he evolved from a family-friendly comic in the mode of Bill Cosby into the challenging, politically aware comedian of his most famous albums. It was recorded on October 29 and 30, 1973, at West Hollywood, California, nightclub The Comedy Store, during a four-night run of performances. At the time, Pryor did not intend to release the recordings commercially, but was preparing for upcoming shows, including the performance at San Francisco's Soul Train Club which would become the Grammy-winning 1974 album That Nigger's Crazy. In the early 1970s, Pryor habitually used the Comedy Store to try out and refine new material. Pryor's evolution was drawing considerable interest within the comedy scene, and his shows were well-attended by other comics.

In his liner notes for the album, Cory Frye notes that much of the material was brand-new and untested, but would reappear in different versions on later albums like That Nigger's Crazy and Bicentennial Nigger. In contrast to Craps (After Hours), which Frye calls "a damn-near symphonic restaging of [Pryor's] life up to that point", on Live At The Comedy Store Pryor brings his newfound political and social awareness back to mainstream audiences, which would result in his breakthrough a year later.

== Reception ==
The Comedy Store performances were acclaimed at the time, as Pryor found his true comic voice, both politically revolutionary and deeply personal. In Living Color comic Tommy Davidson, who was part of the Comedy Store scene, later said that "no one could make life into art onstage like that, while making you laugh so hard you are crying, gasping for air, and falling out of your chair. That was Richard Pryor at the Comedy Store. ... There is comedy before and after Richard Pryor, and no comedy today without him."

Reviewing the album in 2023, Den of Geek writer Tony Sokol said that "Richard is in exquisite form, whether he's updating material or materializing madness." Joe Marchese of The Second Disc called the album "both completely of its time and timeless", and stated that Pryor remained relevant even 50 years later because of his willingness to speak freely, shock audiences and make them think about uncomfortable topics such as race.

== Releases ==
The material on Live at the Comedy Store, 1973 was first released as a promotional extra for the 2013 box set No Pryor Restraint: Life in Concert by Shout! Factory. Omnivore Recordings re-released it as its own project in 2021 with five bonus tracks including additional Comedy Store routines and an edit of "Street Corner Wino", which had appeared earlier on the box sets …And It's Deep Too!: The Complete Warner Bros. Recordings and Evolution/Revolution: The Early Years. Liner notes for the reissues were written by pop-culture journalist Cory Frye. Live At The Comedy Store, 1973 was re-released on vinyl by Stand Up! Records on May 26, 2023, featuring three color versions, a variant cover painting by Jason Edmiston, and original and expanded liner notes.

== Track listing ==
Side one
No.	Title	Length
1.	"Introduction"	0:39
2.	"Street Corner Wino"	9:59
3.	"Wino & Junkie"	5:50
4.	"Fighting"	4:01
5.	"Masturbating"	0:25
6.	"Dope"	1:41
7.	"Sex"	3:16

Side two
No.	Title	Length
8.	"Religion"	4:00
9.	"Acid"	6:25
10.	"Black Movie Stars"	3:24
11.	"Cops"	1:20
12.	"The Line-Up"	3:18
13.	"Nixon"	1:53
14.	"Celebrities In The Audience"	6:53

Bonus tracks
No.	Title	Length
15.	"Death"
16.	"Niggers & Italians"
17.	"Jim Brown (Alternate Version)"
18.	"Black Films"
19.	"Jesus Saves"
20.	"Street Corner Wino (Evolution/Revolution Edit)"

- Tracks 1–14 from Live at the Comedy Store, Hollywood, CA—October 1973 (Shout! Factory, 2013) Recorded at the Comedy Store, 10/29–30/73
- Track 15 from ...And It's Deep, Too!: The Complete Warner Bros. Recordings (1968–1992), (Warner Bros./Rhino, 2000) Recorded at the Comedy Store, 11/73
- Tracks 16–20 from Evolution/Revolution: The Early Years (1966–1974), (Rhino, 2005) Recorded at the Comedy Store, 10/29/73–11/1/73

== Credits ==
- Known original producer: Richard Pryor
- Box set produced by Reggie Collins & Steve Pokorny
- Reissue producer: Jennifer Lee Pryor, Reggie Collins and Cheryl Pawelski
- Remastered by Michael Graves
- Vinyl remastering by Greg Reierson
- Booklet design by Greg Allen
- Liner notes by Cory Frye
- Variant vinyl cover art by Jason Edmiston
