= ...And It's Deep Too! =

...And It's Deep, Too! The Complete Warner Bros. Recordings (1968–1992)

Box set by Richard Pryor
- Released: October 17, 2000
- Recorded: September 1968–October 17, 1992
- Genre: Comedy
- Length: 450:06
- Label: Warner Archives/Rhino/Atlantic Records
- Producers: Robert Marchese; Richard Pryor; David Banks; Biff Dawes

Richard Pryor chronology
Here And Now (1983)	...And It's Deep, Too! The Complete Warner Bros. Recordings (1968–1992) (2000)	The Anthology (1968–1992) (2002)

Professional ratings
Review scores
Source	Rating
Allmusic	5/5 stars
Robert Christgau	A+

...And It's Deep, Too! The Complete Warner Bros. Recordings (1968–1992) is a compilation of all of Richard Pryor's recordings with Warner Bros. Records. It contains material recorded between 1968 and 1992 and was released in 2000 through Rhino Entertainment.

The box set was re-issued in 2013 without the first and last discs as The Warner Bros. Albums (1974-1983), and again on vinyl as I Hope I'm Funny: The Warner Albums (1974-1983).

== Background ==
The collection includes a 76-page booklet, eight CDs released on Warner Bros. between 1968 and 1983, and a ninth CD of previously unreleased material. These albums include:

- Richard Pryor (1968)
- That Nigger's Crazy (1974)
- ...Is It Something I Said? (1975)
- Bicentennial Nigger (1976)
- Wanted/Richard Pryor - Live In Concert (1979)
- Live On The Sunset Strip (1982)
- Here And Now (1983)
- That "African-American" Is STILL Crazy: Good Shit From the Vaults ('70s, '80s, and '90s) (bonus CD)

== Track listing ==
Disc One – Richard Pryor
No.	Title	Length
1.	"Super Nigger"	3:16
2.	"Girls"	3:25
3.	"Farting"	2:02
4.	"Prison Play"	9:12
5.	"T.V. Panel Show"	7:09
6.	"Smells"	2:43
7.	"Army Life"	4:48
8.	"Frankenstein"	0:56

Disc Two – That Nigger's Crazy
No.	Title	Length
1.	"I Hope I'm Funny"	3:28
2.	"Nigger With A Seizure"	5:24
3.	"Have Your Ass Home By 11:00"	2:30
4.	"Black And White Lifestyles"	3:43
5.	"Exorcist"	1:53
6.	"Wino Dealing With Dracula"	2:11
7.	"Flying Saucers"	1:09
8.	"The Back Down"	3:37
9.	"Black Man/White Woman"	0:55
10.	"Niggers Vs. Police"	1:42
11.	"Wino & Junkie"	7:06

Disc Three – ...Is It Something I Said?
No.	Title	Length
1.	"Eulogy"	3:50
2.	"Shortage of White People"	1:24
3.	"New Niggers"	4:00
4.	"Cocaine"	4:10
5.	"Just Us" ((Credited on the album as being "stolen" from Paul Mooney))	3:49
6.	"Mudbone – Intro"	5:45
7.	"Mudbone – Little Feets"	11:50
8.	"When Your Woman Leaves You"	6:30
9.	"The Goodnight Kiss"	1:48
10.	"Women Are Beautiful"	0:53
11.	"Our Text For Today"	3:48
12.	"Ali" (Bonus Track)	3:47

Disc Four – Bicentennial Nigger
No.	Title	Length
1.	"Hillbilly"	2:15
2.	"Black and White Women"	4:06
3.	"Our Gang"	2:48
4.	"Bicentennial Prayer"	6:42
5.	"Black Hollywood"	5:25
6.	"Mudbone Goes to Hollywood"	10:11
7.	"Chinese Restaurant"	1:18
8.	"Acid"	4:55
9.	"Bicentennial Nigger"	2:25

Discs Five & Six – Wanted: Live in Concert
No.	Title	Length
1.	"New Year's Eve"	3:54
2.	"White And Black People"	7:59
3.	"Black Funerals"	2:55
4.	"Discipline"	8:00
5.	"Heart Attacks"	8:11
6.	"Ali"	4:11
7.	"Keeping In Shape"	6:48
8.	"Leon Spinks"	5:09
9.	"Dogs And Horses"	5:50
10.	"Jim Brown"	4:43
11.	"Monkeys"	4:05
12.	"Kids"	3:50
13.	"Nature"	3:31
14.	"Things In The Woods"	3:13
15.	"Deer Hunter"	3:02
16.	"Chinese Food"	3:23
17.	"Being Sensitive"	7:54

Disc Seven – Live on the Sunset Strip
No.	Title	Length
1.	"Women"	11:24
2.	"Prison"	6:25
3.	"Africa"	10:33
4.	"Mafia Club"	6:04
5.	"Mudbone"	7:38
6.	"Freebase"	8:12
7.	"Hospital"	10:17

Disc Eight – Here and Now
No.	Title	Length
1.	"Here and Now"	3:19
2.	"Southern Hospitality"	1:38
3.	"Slavery"	1:15
4.	"Motherland"	6:38
5.	"I Met the President"	4:15
6.	"Fire Exit"	0:46
7.	"Mudbone (Part One)"	6:24
8.	"Mudbone (Part Two)"	4:40
9.	"Inebriated"	5:54
10.	"One Night Stands"	2:54
11.	"One Day at a Time"	4:57
12.	"I Like Women"	6:22
13.	"Being Famous"	2:01
14.	"I Remember"	1:36
15.	"Interview" (Bonus Track)	22:43

Disc Nine – That "African-American" Is STILL Crazy—Good Shit From The Vaults (exclusive Bonus Disc)
No.	Title	Length
1.	"Introduction-Tom Dreesen"
2.	"Mudbone Goes To Hollywood" (Alternate Version)
3.	"Fame (Part 1)"
4.	"Black Messiah"
5.	"Life"
6.	"Death"
7.	"My Funeral"
8.	"Acid" (Alternate Version)
9.	"Patty Hearst"
10.	"Fighting"
11.	"The Law"
12.	"History Lesson"
13.	"I Don't Give A Fuck"
14.	"Fame (Part Two)"
15.	"Therapy"
16.	"W.A.S.P.'s"
17.	"Getting Older"
18.	"God"
19.	"Dog"
20.	"M.S."
