= Here and Now (Richard Pryor album) =

Richard Pryor: Here and Now

Live album by Richard Pryor
- Released: 1983
- Genre: Comedy
- Length: 52:30
- Label: Warner Bros.

Richard Pryor chronology
Richard Pryor: Live on the Sunset Strip (1982)	Richard Pryor: Here and Now (1983)	Live at the Comedy Store, 1973 (2011)

Richard Pryor: Here and Now is a 1983 Grammy nominated comedy album based on the film Richard Pryor: Here and Now.

== Track listing ==
1. "Here and Now" - 3:19
2. "Southern Hospitality" - 1:38
3. "Slavery" - 1:15
4. "Motherland" - 6:38
5. "I Met the President" - 4:15
6. "Fire Exit" - 0:46
7. "Mudbone (Part One)" - 6:24
8. "Mudbone (Part Two)" - 4:40
9. "Inebriated" - 5:54
10. "One Night Stands" - 2:54
11. "One Day at a Time" - 4:57
12. "I Like Women" - 6:22
13. "Being Famous" - 2:01
14. "I Remember" - 1:36
15. "Interview" (Boxset Bonus Track) - 22:43

== Critical reception ==
Steve Newton of The Georgia Straight wrote, "If you can put up with Pryor's consistently crude language, Here and Now is good for plenty of laughs. And his alter-ego, Mudbone, puts in an appearance as well. Could quite possibly be the comedy album of '83."

== Box set reissue ==
In 2025, Here and Now was reissued along with a box set of Richard Pryor's comedy albums by Rhino Entertainment.

From Rhino's press release of the box set, it states: "Recorded when Pryor was clean and sober for the first time since he was 14 years old, the Grammy-nominated release saw the comic riffing on the trials of fame, meeting President Reagan, and the trials and tribulations of being a married man."
