= Mudbone =

Mudbone may refer to:

- Mudbone (character), a recurring character in Richard Pryor's stand-up shows
- Travelling Riverside Blues, a song by Robert Johnson sometimes known as "Mudbone" or "Mud Bone"
