= Richard Pryor: Live in Concert =

1979 film

- Film poster
- Directed by: Jeff Margolis
- Written by: Richard Pryor
- Produced by: Stephen Blauner; Hillard Elkins; Del Jack; William Sargent Jr. J. Mark Travis
- Starring: Richard Pryor
- Cinematography: Tom Schamp
- Edited by: Daniel J. Johnson; Ken Johnson; Steve Livingston
- Music by: Patti LaBelle
- Production companies: Elkins Entertainment; SEE Theater Network
- Distributed by: Special Event Entertainment
- Release date: February 2, 1979
- Running time: 78 minutes
- Language: English
- Budget: $750,000
- Box office: $15.8 million

Richard Pryor: Live in Concert is a 1979 American stand-up comedy concert film starring and written by Richard Pryor, and directed by Jeff Margolis.

== Production ==
The film was shot at the Terrace Theater in Long Beach, California on December 10, 1978. It was produced and distributed independently, and was the first full-length feature movie consisting of only stand-up comedy. The double album Wanted: Live in Concert was recorded at other dates during the same tour, and features much of the same material included in the film.

== Reception and legacy ==
In her review of Richard Pryor Live in Concert, Pauline Kael commented, "Probably the greatest of all recorded-performance films. Pryor had characters and voices bursting out of him .... Watching this mysteriously original physical comedian you can't account for his gift and everything he does seems to be for the first time." Eddie Murphy has called it "the single greatest stand-up performance ever captured on film."

On the review aggregator website Rotten Tomatoes, 92% of 13 critics' reviews are positive.

The film opened in 43 theaters in the United States and grossed $380,996 in its opening weekend. It went on to gross $15.8 million.

In 2021, the film was selected for preservation in the United States National Film Registry by the Library of Congress as being "culturally, historically, or aesthetically significant".

=== Accolades ===
Recipient(s)	Award	Category	Result	Ref(s)
Richard Pryor	National Society of Film Critics	Best Actor (5th place) (tied with Klaus Kinski for Nosferatu the Vampyre and Roy Scheider for All That Jazz)	Nominated	
