= Cha Cha Hogan =

American comedian and musician (1920–1986)

- Hogan (top right) with the Ink Spots in 1979
- Born: Sumter Joseph Hogan Sr. December 8, 1920; New Orleans, Louisiana, U.S.
- Died: November 1986 (aged 65); Las Vegas, Nevada, U.S.
- Other names: Mr. Ink Spot, The Black Foxx
- Occupations: Comedian, musician, entertainer
- Years active: 1940s-1986
- Notable work: Brother Eatmore & Sister Fullbosom "My Walking Baby"

Sumter Joseph "Cha Cha" Hogan (December 8, 1920 – November 9, 1986), sometimes credited as "Mr. Ink Spot" or "The Black Foxx", was an American comedian, musician, songwriter and civil-rights activist.

His 1950 song "My Walking Baby" helped popularize the term "rock 'n' roll" and was covered by Professor Longhair as the more famous "She Walks Right In". He may be most well known for his 1971 comedy album Brother Eatmore & Sister Fullbosom and appearances on the sitcom Sanford and Son. He was a member of pop vocal group The Ink Spots in the 1970s and '80s.

== Early life ==
Hogan was born in New Orleans, Louisiana, in 1920, the son of Daniel and Gertrude Florence Hogan. He was given the nickname "Cha Cha" at age eight.

He served in the Army during World War II. His brother Lester also served in World War II and later worked at a Chrysler factory in Michigan. Hogan worked as a cab driver in New Orleans in the 1940s as he was starting his entertainment career.

== Career ==
Although he did not record much, Hogan had a versatile, nearly 50-year career as an emcee, comedian, and singer, appearing in mostly black venues across the United States. Music historian Sampson of the website Spontaneous Lunacy judged Hogan as a passionate and charming if limited singer with a "rather undisciplined voice and somewhat derivative style", but a skilled songwriter.

=== Early career: 1940s and 1950s ===
Although Hogan apparently first began performing in his hometown of New Orleans, Hogan traveled widely and also was well known in Detroit from the earliest days of his career. In 1948, he appeared in a Detroit Tribune reader poll for male vocalist, finishing second-to-last. He told a newspaper reporter that year that he had worked in many cities, and complained that he had "gained nothing in Detroit but a lot of songs he cannot sell."

In 1949 he was back in New Orleans, and prominent enough to be featured in a local liquor advertisement. His music was championed by New Orleans radio DJ and newspaper columnist Vernon Winslow. Both he and Professor Longhair were frequent performers at the popular Caldonia Inn, before either had recorded.

In 1950, he traveled to Dallas to record for Star Talent Records, a small Texas-based label whose roster included Rufus Thomas, Professor Longhair, and other blues, gospel, and country artists from Dallas, Memphis, and New Orleans. The resultant single, "My Baby Loves Me" b/w "My Walking Baby", was released later that year. Professor Longhair covered "My Walking Baby" in February 1950 as "She Walks Right In", released on the much larger label Atlantic Records. Longhair's reinterpretation has been critically acclaimed as one of his signature tunes. Spontaneous Lunacy called Hogan's original "a rambunctious record full of horny enthusiasm, churning rhythms and—by the second half—some really wild, almost demented, vocals by a revved up Hogan, making for an entertaining and extremely memorable debut".

Huey "Piano" Smith knew Hogan as a jump-blues shouter in 1950 New Orleans, and credits Hogan with popularizing the term "rock 'n' roll" in "My Walking Baby". Smith was also impressed by Hogan's refusal to allow a white restaurant owner in New Jersey to discriminate against him, calling for the police when the man refused to seat him.

By the early 1950s, Hogan was back in Detroit, where he emceed comedy and burlesque shows at the Flamingo Club. He had better career fortune: In an April 1954 version of the earlier Detroit Tribune readers' poll, Hogan was named the best male vocalist in the city, beating John Lee Hooker, who came in second, 565 to 365. In 1953, he was signed to Detroit-based Great Lakes Records, but never released anything on the label.

=== Later career: 1960s, 1970s, and 1980s ===
Hogan continued performing in nightclubs for the rest of his life, working in Detroit as a comic, singer, and emcee, often opening for Motown groups like the Four Tops, but also traveling widely, including New Orleans, Las Vegas, Philadelphia, Los Angeles, Sacramento, California, and several trips to Singapore. He also had a sideline as a songwriter.

He was noted for a flamboyant appearance; a reporter for the Singapore Monitor described his "smooth shiny pate and a dazzling diamond earring in his left ear."

In 1969, he recorded the single "Just Because You've Been Hurt" b/w "Grit Gitter" for Harrisburg, Pennsylvania label Soulville Records. A reviewer in Cashbox magazine called "Grit Gitter" a "striking soul instrumental with a high-stepping rhythm line that should bring reaction".

His biggest recording success was the 1971 comedy album Brother Eatmore & Sister Fullbosom, an X-rated "party record" drawn in part from historic vaudeville routines, released on the Los Angeles label Laff Records and credited to "Cha Cha Hogan, The Black Foxx." The album was an underground hit in the black community, and got a four-star rating in Billboard. Some copies of Richard Pryor's Laff release Craps (After Hours) were misprinted with Brother Eatmore & Sister Fullbosom on the second side.

He befriended comedian Redd Foxx, who invited him to appear on two episodes of his hit sitcom Sanford and Son in 1973 and 1975.

Hogan was the lead singer in two versions of pop vocal group The Ink Spots managed by Stanley Morgan and George Holmes in the 1970s and '80s, recording with the group on 1979's The Best of the Ink Spots. Due to his connection with the band, he began to be known by a new nickname, "Mr. Ink Spot".

== Personal life ==
He was married twice, to Marribell Imogene Shelton in 1950 in New Orleans, and to Dorothy Elaine Beacham in 1972 in Nevada.

== Death ==
Hogan died in November 1986 in Las Vegas, which had been his home for several years.

== Selected discography ==
Brother Eatmore & Sister Fullbosom
Review scores
Source	Rating
Billboard	4/5 stars

- Cha Cha Hogan, "My Baby Loves Me" b/w "My Walking Baby" (Star Talent Records, 1950)
- Cha Cha Hogan, "Just Because You've Been Hurt" b/w "Grit Gitter" (Soulville Records, 1969)
- Cha Cha Hogan, Brother Eatmore & Sister Fullbosom (Laff Records, 1971)
- The Ink Spots, Best Of The Ink Spots (Murray Hill Records, 1979)
- Various Artists, The Star Talent Records Story (Airline Records, 2015) includes Hogan's two 1950 songs
- Various Artists, Soulful Sounds From Soulville (Get Hip Archive Series, 2020) includes Hogan's "Grit Gitter"
