= Elizabeth Stordeur Pryor =

American historian

- Born: Elizabeth Anne Pryor; April 25, 1967 (age 59); Los Angeles, California, U.S.
- Spouse: Jerry Stordeur
- Children: 2
- Parents: Richard Pryor; Maxine Silverman
- Relatives: Rain Pryor (half-sister)

Academic background
- Education: Tufts University (BA); Cornell University (MA); University of California, Santa Barbara (PhD)

Academic work
- Discipline: History
- Institutions: Smith College
- Website: https://www.pryorhistories.com

Elizabeth Stordeur Pryor (née Elizabeth Anne Pryor; (Note: Some sources give the spelling of the middle name as "Ann", but Pryor gives it as "Anne" in her own memoir.) April 25, 1967) is an American historian. She is a professor of history at Smith College. Pryor is the author of Colored Travelers: Mobility and the Fight for Citizenship before the Civil War (2016), a history of travel by African-Americans prior to the American Civil War, and Something We Said: Richard Pryor, a Notorious Word, and Me (2026), a mix of memoir and historical reflection on the use of a racial slur that she refers to as the "N-word" or "n***er".

== Reception ==
Colored Travelers was reviewed in multiple academic journals, including The American Historical Review, the American Journal of Legal History, The Journal of American History, The Journal of the Civil War Era, The Journal of Southern History, The Journal of Transport History, The New England Quarterly, Pennsylvania History, Studies in Travel Writing, and Technology and Culture.

Something We Said was reviewed by Forbes, The Forward, Kirkus Reviews, The New York Times, and syndicated book reviewer Terri Schlichenmeyer.

== Personal life ==
Pryor was born at Cedars of Lebanon Hospital in Los Angeles, California, on April 25, 1967. She is the daughter of Maxine Silverman and comedian Richard Pryor. She is Jewish through her mother. Her parents separated shortly after her birth and she was raised primarily by her mother. She first met her father in 1974 in a hotel room in Newark, New Jersey.

Pryor attended the Westlake School for Girls. After graduating from Tufts University in 1989, she received a Master of Arts from Cornell and a PhD from the University of California, Santa Barbara. She is married to Jerry Stordeur, whom she met while she was attending Cornell; they have two children.

== Selected works ==
- "The Etymology of Nigger: Resistance, Language, and the Politics of Freedom in the Antebellum North". Journal of the Early Republic. 36 (2): 203–245. Summer 2016. doi:10.1353/jer.2016.0028
- Colored Travelers: Mobility and the Fight for Citizenship before the Civil War. University of North Carolina Press. 2016. ISBN 978-1-4696-2857-8.
- "Why It's So Hard to Talk about the N-word". TEDx. December 2019.
- Something We Said: Richard Pryor, a Notorious Word, and Me. 37 INK. 2016. ISBN 978-1-9821-5450-9.
