= Craps (After Hours) =

1971 stand-up comedy album by Richard Pryor

Live album by Richard Pryor
- Released: 1971
- Venues: Redd Foxx Club, Hollywood, California
- Genre: Comedy
- Length: 36:21
- Labels: Laff; Omnivore Records, Stand Up! Records (reissue)
- Producers: David Drozen, Richard Pryor; Jennifer Lee Pryor, Reggie Collins, Cheryl Pawelski (reissue)

Richard Pryor chronology
Richard Pryor (1968)	Craps (After Hours) (1971)	That Nigger's Crazy (1974)

Professional ratings
Review scores
Source	Rating
AllMusic	3/5 stars

Craps (After Hours) is the second album by American comedian Richard Pryor, released in 1971 on the Laff Records label.

== History ==
Craps (After Hours), like his other early-1970s albums Richard Pryor and Live At The Comedy Store, 1973, captures Pryor during his most transformative period as a comic, when he evolved from a family-friendly comic in the mode of Bill Cosby into the challenging, politically aware comedian of his most famous albums. In the early 1970s, Pryor moved to Berkeley, California, and had begun to consciously immerse himself in black culture and history, educating himself through conversations with writers and revolutionaries such as Angela Davis, Black Panther Huey Newton, and Ishmael Reed. In contrast to his earlier career performing for mostly white audiences, he began working at Redd Foxx's club in a black neighborhood of Los Angeles, where he felt free to talk about issues of politics and race without restraint.

== Reception ==
On its initial release, Craps (After Hours) was a cult success, heard mostly by a black audience, but clearly laid the groundwork for his breakthrough album, 1974's That Nigger's Crazy. A 1971 review in Billboard said that "Pryor's funky material not only tickles the laugh centers on taboos between black and white, sex and the city, cops and politics, but also brings humor to subjects that people find difficult to laugh at."

AllMusic's Steve Kurutz called the album a "perfect example" of how Pryor "honed his more raunchy material in black comedy clubs, road-testing the controversial act about sex, racism, and his own screwups that he would use to great effect later in his career", adding that "though his monologues and segues aren't as razor-sharp and seamless as they would become on records like Bicentennial Nigger, they're still pretty damn funny."

Reviewing the album in 2023, Den of Geek writer Tony Sokol said that despite Pryor's "casual and loose" delivery, his evolution is unmistakable: "The tone is more aggressive, the attacks are direct, the confessions are intimate and relentless. Pryor is unafraid to get naked, admitting to extreme paranoia and horrific bouts of jealousy. Listening to it now, he’s harder on himself than anyone he aims his jabs at." Joe Marchese of The Second Disc noted that the freedom Pryor felt in performing in front of a largely black audience at Redd Foxx's club allowed him to take "his art to the next level, freed of expectations and censorship."

== Releases ==
Craps (After Hours) was originally released in 1971 on Laff Records. Some of the original LPs were accidentally mispressed with another comic's album on the B-side, Detroit comedian and musician Cha Cha Hogan's Brother Eatmore & Sister Fullbosom, which was released on Laff the same year as Pryor's album. Laff also released Craps (After Hours) under the name Blackjack with different cover art, and side two was re-released in a 1973 split LP with Redd Foxx, Pryor Goes Foxx Hunting.

The album was re-released on CD in 1994.

Omnivore Recordings released an expanded edition in 2021 with bonus material selected from the box sets Evolution/Revolution: The Early Years and No Pryor Restraint: Life in Concert. Liner notes for the reissues were written by Scott Saul, author of the biography Becoming Richard Pryor, with an introduction by Dolemite Is My Name screenwriter Larry Karaszewski. It was re-released on vinyl by Stand Up! Records on May 26, 2023, as a double LP, with side four featuring an engraving of the original cover art.

== Track listing ==
LP one
No.	Title	Length
1.	"Gettin' High"	1:05
2.	"Fuck from Memory"	2:34
3.	"Big Tits"	0:55
4.	"Gettin' Some"	0:45
5.	"The President"	0:35
6.	"Ass-Hole"	2:55
7.	"The Line-Up"	4:15
8.	"Masturbating"	0:11
9.	"Religion"	2:13
10.	"Black Preachers"	1:47
11.	"Being Born"	0:12
12.	"Blow Our Image"	0:34
13.	"Blackjack"	0:26
14.	"I Spy Cops"	1:26
15.	"Sugar Ray"	1:32
16.	"White Folks"	0:54
17.	"Indians"	0:39
18.	"Ass Wupin'"	0:53
19.	"Got a Dollar"	0:59
20.	"Pres' Black Baby"	0:10
21.	"Dope"	0:13
22.	"Wino Panthers"	0:16
23.	"After Hours"	0:51
24.	"280 Pound Ass"	0:40
25.	"Crap Game"	5:23
26.	"Insurance Man"	0:28
27.	"Black and Proud"	0:25
28.	"Gettin' the Nut"	0:41
29.	"Fuck the Faggot"	0:25
30.	"Jackin' Off"	0:17
31.	"Snappin' Pussy"	0:29
32.	"Fartin'"	1:22

LP two
No.	Title	Length
33.	"Whorehouse Pt. 1"	1:01
34.	"Whorehouse Pt. 2"	2:32
35.	"Wino and Junkie (Alternate Version)"	7:59
36.	"Attica (Behind Those Walls)"	4:30

- Tracks 1-32 from Craps (After Hours) (Laff Records, 1971) Recorded at the Redd Foxx Club, Hollywood, California, December 1970
- Tracks 33-36 from Evolution/Revolution: The Early Years (1966-1974) and No Pryor Restraint: Life in Concert.

== Credits ==
- Executive producer: Louis Drozen
- Original producer: David Drozen, Richard Pryor
- Original album art direction/cover design: Howard Goldstein
- Known original producer (bonus tracks): Richard Pryor
- Compilation produced by Reggie Collins & Steve Pokorny (bonus tracks)
- Reissue producer: Jennifer Lee Pryor, Reggie Collins and Cheryl Pawelski
- Remastered by Michael Graves
- Booklet design by Greg Allen
- Liner notes by Scott Saul and Larry Karaszewski
