= Live & Smokin' =

Richard Pryor: Live & Smokin'
- DVD cover
- Directed by: Michael Blum
- Written by: Richard Pryor
- Produced by: Michael Blum
- Starring: Richard Pryor
- Cinematography: Michael Blum
- Distributed by: MPI Home Video
- Release date: April 29, 1971
- Running time: 48 minutes
- Country: United States
- Language: English

Richard Pryor: Live & Smokin' is a 1971 American stand-up comedy concert film directed by Michael Blum, who also served as cinematographer and producer. The film stars Richard Pryor, who also wrote. Filmed in New York City in early January 1971, it is the earliest Pryor stand-up comedy act to be filmed of the four that were released. This was Pryor's first stand-up act before he reached the mainstream audience; with only 48 minutes of footage, it is also the shortest of his stand-up routines.
