= Richard Pryor: I Ain't Dead Yet =

Richard Pryor: I Ain't Dead Yet, #*%$@#!!
- DVD cover
- Directed by: Billy Grundfest
- Written by: Sue Wolf
- Produced by: Sue Wolf
- Starring: Richard Pryor
- Distributed by: Comedy Central
- Release date: November 30, 2003
- Running time: 40 minutes 70 minutes (DVD)
- Country: United States
- Language: English

Richard Pryor: I Ain't Dead Yet, #*%$#@!! is a 2003 American short documentary film about and featuring comedian Richard Pryor. It was produced and aired by Comedy Central. It features commentary from different actors, comedians, and Pryor's own family members on the aspects and influence of his life and work. The title of the film came from a statement made by Pryor, who said "I have MS, but I ain't dead yet!"

The film was released just over two years before Pryor's death in 2005. It was played multiple times on Comedy Central and later re-edited and broadcast after his death.
