= Mudbone (character) =

- First appearance: ...Is It Something I Said?
- Last appearance: Richard Pryor: Here and Now
- Created by: Richard Pryor
- Portrayed by: Richard Pryor

In-universe information
- Race: African American
- Gender: Male
- Origin: United States
- Nationality: American

Mudbone is a recurring character in Richard Pryor's stand-up shows. Debuting on the 1975 album ...Is It Something I Said?. Mudbone is perhaps Pryor's most famous creation. A black wino philosopher born in Tupelo, Mississippi, his character was an alter-ego for Pryor.

During Pryor's concert film, Richard Pryor: Live on the Sunset Strip, the audience begins to yell "Do Mudbone!" and Pryor reluctantly resurrects the character.
