= Laff Records =

American independent record label

- Laff Records logo
- Founded: 1967
- Founder: Lou Drozen
- Defunct: 1985
- Genre: Comedy, party records
- Country of origin: U.S.
- Location: Los Angeles

Laff Records was a small American independent record label specializing in mainly African-American comedy and party records. It was founded in 1967 in Los Angeles.

Kliph Nesteroff, author of the book The Comedians, wrote that "no other company cranked out as many comedy LPs during the 1970s. While much of its content was undeniably amateurish, it documented a subculture most comedy fans were unaware existed." It is most well known for releasing a series of Richard Pryor albums, mostly without Pryor's participation or approval, which earned the label several Grammy nominations and one win.

== History ==
Laff Records was founded in 1967 in Los Angeles by jewelry-store owner Lou Drozen; his son David Drozen joined in 1969 as vice president and producer of many of its albums.

Although the label began with a focus on white artists, the Drozens shifted focus to the black audience in 1970, feeling that the market for black comedians was still untapped. They took out radio ads in major cities, increasing their sales by 300 percent and enabling them to move into larger offices.

Richard Pryor was one of the first comedians to be signed by the label after the change in direction. The roster also included Redd Foxx, LaWanda Page, George Carlin, black ventriloquist duo Richard And Willie, Belle Barth, Rex Benson, Cha Cha Hogan, Skillet & Leroy, Reynaldo Rey, Mantan Moreland, Clarence "Blowfly" Reid, and Wildman Steve. Laff also released a few discs by white artists, notably including Kip Addotta's "Wet Dream", Car 54, Where Are You? star Joe E. Ross' Should Lesbians Be Allowed to Play Pro-Football?, and Little House on the Prairie actress Alison Arngrim's 1977 album Heeere's Amy, on which she impersonated President Jimmy Carter's daughter Amy.

Releases on Laff were notorious for raunchy content on both the record and its album jacket. Many releases had to be denoted with an "Adults Only" warning on the front cover and sold under the counter, decades before the infamous Parental Advisory sticker was a fixture on album covers. Radio advertising on black stations was crucial in getting customers to ask for the records by name at the stores. Many Laff album covers featured topless models. Jimmie Walker of the sitcom Good Times once told a reporter, “I almost had a deal with Laff Records, but they were a little too dirty for me.”

Laff also became notorious both for the questionable quality of its record pressings and for its frequent repackaging of previously released titles with new titles and artwork. Pryor's vast quantity of releases issued by Laff is a case in point. Pryor released only one album for Laff, Craps (After Hours), with his direct participation and then later signed a deal with the larger Stax label. Laff sued Pryor after Stax released That Nigger's Crazy in 1974; the case was settled when Laff gave Pryor his freedom in exchange for being allowed to compile albums from recordings it made with Pryor between 1969 and 1973.

Pryor was a huge artist for the label even after he parted ways. The label received a Grammy Award for Best Comedy Album in 1982 for its release of the Pryor disc Rev. Du Rite, as well as nominations for 1978's Are You Serious???, 1979's The Wizard of Comedy, and 1981's Holy Smoke. Pryor himself publicly criticized the albums for including material that was nearly a decade old at the time, and encouraged Grammy voters to choose something else. Many comedians, including Pryor and Shecky Greene, complained that the terms Laff offered them were unfair and unfavorable; Greene called Drozen a "hustler." Pryor had signed with Laff for only $5,000, which Drozen said Pryor urgently needed to pay off his drug dealers.

By 1979, the label had a catalog of more than 100 records.

The Drozens also expanded into different genres, releasing non-comedy albums under the label Ala Records starting with the 1971 record Rappin' Black in a White World by political poetry group The Watts Prophets, as well as the Little Richard and Jimi Hendrix album Friends From the Beginning and the 1984 rap album Skid Row by Freddy Starr. In the late 1970s, the Drozens founded two new labels, Jazz World and Gospeltone.

David Drozen left the label in 1984 after disagreements with his father. Laff folded a year later. Its last "hit" recording was Kip Addotta's "Wet Dream" (a favorite of fans of the Dr. Demento radio show), but many of their more profitable recordings still circulated through other labels for some time afterward. In 1993, Island Records briefly re-released Foxx and Pryor titles on cassette and compact disc that had been originally issued by Laff, including Pryor's Craps (After Hours). These releases disappeared from store shelves after Island's parent company PolyGram was absorbed by Universal Music.

=== Post-dissolution ===
In 2002 Richard Pryor and his wife/manager, Jennifer Lee Pryor, purchased the rights to all of Richard's Laff masters and raw tapes from San Juan Music, the successor in interest to Laff Records. The Pryors then gave free rein to Rhino Records to go through the tapes and make an anthology that included the entire Craps (After Hours) album and the best of other Laff releases. The results were released in 2005 on the 2-CD set Evolution/Revolution: The Early Years (1966–1974).

David Drozen later became president of the label Uproar Entertainment, which has reissued some of the remaining Laff masters.

Note that there were several earlier, unrelated companies that issued 78 rpm discs under the name Laff Records in the late 1940s. Of these, one was based in New York, a second was allegedly from Chicago, and a third released titles under the name Laff-Disc (later abbreviated to L D). All were probably defunct long before the Los Angeles label began operations.

== See also ==
- List of record labels
