= Evolution/Revolution =

Evolution/Revolution: The Early Years (1966–1974)

Live album by Richard Pryor
- Released: 2005
- Recorded: February 1966 to Autumn 1974
- Genre: Comedy
- Length: 2:38:52
- Label: Rhino
- Producer: Richard Pryor, Robert Marchese, David Drozen

Richard Pryor chronology
| The Anthology (1968–1992) (2002) | Evolution/Revolution: The Early Years (1966–1974) (2005) |

Professional ratings
Review scores
| Source | Rating |
|---|---|
| Uncut | (favorable) |

Evolution/Revolution: The Early Years (1966–1974) is a two-CD compilation of live stand-up comedy recordings by comedian and actor Richard Pryor, that predates his 1974 mainstream breakthrough album That Nigger's Crazy.

The album was primarily compiled from tapes recorded by Laff Records between 1966 and 1974. By 1968, Pryor had only recorded and released one album up to that point, the eponymous debut that was released by Dove/Reprise and featured a much milder Pryor.

== Background ==
In 1970 Pryor signed with Laff Records to record and release his second album, the underground classic Craps (After Hours). After its release in February 1971, Pryor sought out a larger label for his next album but didn't find it until 1974 when he signed with Stax Records, who originally released That Nigger's Crazy. Laff promptly sued Pryor, but a settlement allowed Pryor to become a free agent in exchange for allowing Laff to release all previously unissued material with them. After Pryor signed with Warner Bros. Records in 1975, where he kicked his recording career into high gear with the release of ...Is It Something I Said? and the reissue of That Nigger's Crazy, Laff began rushing out badly packaged and mastered albums to piggyback Pryor's Warner Bros. releases.

Between 1971 and 1983, Laff released twelve albums worth of Pryor material, but spread out the contents amongst twenty different albums, including releases that either repackaged older albums with new titles and covers, or albums that paired Pryor tracks from Craps with previously issued material from other comedians who had recorded for Laff (including Redd Foxx).

In 2002, Pryor and his wife/manager Jennifer Lee Pryor won the legal rights all of the Laff material with Pryor's name on it—over 40 hours of unedited reel-to-reel tapes—containing recordings both issued and unissued. Jennifer Lee Pryor then gave Reggie Collins and Steve Pokorny, the men who had previously compiled the ...And It's Deep Too! The Complete Warner Bros. Recordings (1968–1992) nine-CD box set and its companion 2-CD Anthology for Rhino, access to all of the tapes.

Disc 1 contains what is said to be the best of the material Laff had released on record after 1974, while Disc 2 contains the entire Craps album plus other unreleased material, including the unedited version of Pryor's entire Wattstax monologue.

The album packaging also contains liner notes from journalist David Felton, who had interviewed Pryor several times, including around the time of That Nigger's Crazy's release and after Pryor had his 1980 free-basing accident.

== Track listing ==
=== Disc One: Evolution (1966–1968) ===
1. "Peoria"
2. "Improv, Pt. 1"
3. "Heart & Brain"
4. "Taxi Cabs & Subways"
5. "Playboy Club"
6. "Rumpelstiltskin"
7. "Slippin' In Poo Poo"
8. "Birth Control"
9. "Nigger Babies"
10. "Faith Healer"
11. "Black Power"
12. "I Feel"
13. "Jail"
14. "Prison Play" (aka Black Ben The Blacksmith)
15. "Directions"
16. "Movie Stars In The Bathroom"
17. "War Movies"
18. "The Army"
19. "Hippy Dippys"
20. "Hank's Place"
21. "Improv, Pt. 2"
22. "Mankind"

==== Recording Details ====
Disc One recorded live at:

- The Hungry I, San Francisco, CA, February 1966 (Tracks 1, 2)
- unknown venue, July 15, 1967 (Tracks 4, 5)
- P.J.'s, Hollywood, CA, May 24 & 25, 1968 (Tracks 7–11)
- The Troubador, West Hollywood, April 1968 (Tracks 14, 15, 21, 22) and July 26–29, 1968 (remainder)

=== Disc Two: Revolution (1971–1974) ===
1. Prelude
2. Gettin' High
3. Fuck From Memory
4. Big Tits
5. Gettin' Some
6. The President
7. Asshole
8. The Line-Up
9. Masturbating
10. Religion
11. Black Preachers
12. Being Born
13. Blow Our Image
14. Blackjack
15. I Spy Cops
16. Sugar Ray
17. White Folks
18. Indians
19. Ass Wupin'
20. Got A Dollar
21. Pres' Black Baby
22. Doope
23. Wino Panthers
24. After Hours
25. 280 Pound Ass
26. Crap Game
27. Insurance Man
28. Black And Proud
29. Gettin' The Nut
30. Fuck The Faggot
31. Jackin' Off
32. Snappin' Pussy
33. Fartin'
34. Wattstax Monologue:
  - Niggers
  - The Handshake
  - Rummage Sale/Stylin'
  - Whitey
  - "Justifiable Homicide"
  - Super Nigger
  - Marijawani
35. Whorehouse, Pt. 1
36. Whorehouse, Pt. 2
37. Niggers & Italians
38. Jim Brown (alternate version)
39. Black Films
40. Jesus Saves
41. Street Corner Wino ("Wino & Junkie" intro)
42. Wino & Junkie
43. Interview

==== Recording Details ====
Disc Two recorded live at:

- The Redd Foxx Club, Hollywood, CA, January 1971 (Tracks 2-33—the entire Craps (After Hours) album)
- Laney College, Oakland, CA, February 25, 1971 (Track 35)
- Basin Street West, San Francisco, CA, February 26, 1971 (Tracks 36, 42)
- unknown venue, Los Angeles, CA, May 30, 1971 (Track 1)
- The Summit Club, Hollywood, CA, October 8, 1972, for use in the motion picture Wattstax (Track 34)
- The Comedy Store, Hollywood, CA, October 29-November 1, 1973 (Tracks 37–41)
- unknown location in San Francisco Bay Area, Fall 1974 (Track 43)

== Primary recording credits ==
- Known Original Producers: Richard Pryor, Robert Marchese & David Drozen
- Executive Producer (Craps (After Hours)): Louis Drozen
- Known Original Engineers: Ron Johnson, Gabby Garcia, Chris Chigaridas
- Compilation Produced By: Reggie Collins and Steve Pokorny
- Supervising Producer: Jennifer Lee Pryor
- Executive Producer: Richard Pryor
