= Pryor Convictions =

1995 autobiography by Richard Pryor

- Author: Richard Pryor with Todd Gold
- Language: English
- Genre: Comedian memoir
- Publisher: Pantheon Books (Revolver Books)
- Publication date: May 10, 1995
- Publication place: United States
- Pages: 288
- ISBN: 0954940741

Pryor Convictions: And Other Life Sentences is an autobiography by the American comedian Richard Pryor. The book was published in 1995. Included are details of Pryor's rough childhood growing up in his mother's brothel, his drug problems, his sexuality, his seven marriages, his self-immolation, his struggles coping with multiple sclerosis, and his stand-up career.

== Reception ==
Kirkus Reviews called the book "a powerful autobiography of a talented man who made every effort to ruin his body and his career and lived to tell the tale" but commented that it didn't reveal any "big surprises."

The book was given over 1,800 ratings on Goodreads and received 4.05 out of 5 stars.

Jason Zinoman included Pryor Convictions in a 2021 list of the nine funniest books in the comedian memoir genre:

The outlines of his now famous story, raised in a brothel in Peoria, becoming wildly famous for revolutionary personal comedy, setting himself on fire, has been chronicled many times, but never in more raw, blunt detail than here, which makes this essential reading for comedy fans.
