= Pryor's Place =

- Title card featuring Richard Pryor and other characters.
- Genre: Children's television series Comedy
- Created by: Sid and Marty Krofft; Lorne Frohman
- Starring: Richard Pryor; Akhil Prince
- Opening theme: "Pryor's Place" by Ray Parker Jr.
- Ending theme: "Pryor's Place" (reprisal)
- Country of origin: United States
- Original language: English
- No. of seasons: 1
- No. of episodes: 13

Production
- Running time: 25 minutes

Original release
- Network: CBS
- Release: September 15 – December 8, 1984

Pryor's Place is an American children's television series that aired for one season in 1984 on CBS. The live-action series starred comedian Richard Pryor.

== Overview ==
Despite a reputation for profanity from Richard Pryor, Pryor's Place was aimed at children. Like Sesame Street, Pryor's Place featured a cast of puppets hanging out and having fun in a friendly inner-city environment, along with several children and characters portrayed by Pryor himself.

The theme song was performed by Ray Parker Jr.of Ghostbusters fame, who also appeared in the show's opening credits. The series was also fitted with a laugh track. Commercial-bumpers were announced by an uncredited Rick Dees.

== Plot ==
Richard Pryor will tell the viewers of things that had happen to him in his neighborhood when he was a child and the experiences that he had. Pryor also portrays different people that interact with his younger self and also meets other people that give advice on how to get through each plight.

These events were mixed with an assortment of different puppet characters that would commentate on what is happening.

== Characters ==
- Richard "Richie" Pryor (portrayed by himself as an adult, Akhil Prince as a child) is the main protagonist of the series. Richard will recap on life in his neighborhood during his childhood days while encountering different people.
- Bummer (portrayed by Richard Pryor) is a homeless man that Richie interacts with.
- Carlotta Knows (portrayed by Richard Pryor) is a street fortune teller that Richie interacts with whose crystal ball sees all and knows all.
- Chills (portrayed by Richard Pryor) is a street saxophonist in dreadlocks that Richie interacts with.
- Wally (portrayed by Cliffy Magee) is a friend of Richie.
- Ms. Stern (portrayed by Marla Gibbs) is a teacher at Richie's school.
- Al and Marge are two mice that live beneath the street. They commentate on what happens in the street above their house in a sewer drain.
- The Bakery Food are an assortment of baked goods that reside in the widow of the local bakery who commentate on what happens on the street. They consist of a chocolate cake, a boule, a pan of cornbread muffins, a basket of French bread, a pumpernickel bread, and a sourdough bread.

== Episodes ==
No.	Title	Original release date
1	"High Noon at 5:30 P.M."	September 15, 1984
Main character Richie (ostensibly Pryor as a child) is challenged to an afterschool showdown by Meatrack, the neighborhood bully.
2	"To Catch a Little Thief"	September 22, 1984
In the series pilot, Richie shoplifts a basketball to join a street gang...but the street gang instead leaves him at the mercy of an angry pawnshop-owner and the police.
3	"Love Means Never Being Sorry You Didn't Say It"	September 29, 1984
Richie’s painful first romance with a classmate.
4	"Voyage to the Planet of the Dumb"	October 6, 1984
Richie and three ambitious peers ditch school to meet with Joe, a shady talent agent who also happens to own the local video arcade...and who teaches these four young dropouts the value of education, by magically transporting them to a distant planet whose very atmosphere saps points from its denizens' IQs.
5	"Close Encounters of…"	October 13, 1984
Richie tries to get a fuzzy alien home.
6	"Sax Education"	October 20, 1984
After misplacing a saxophone which Chills left in his care, Richie must raise $300 to buy a replacement. He and Wally hold a garage sale, which soon turns into a counterfeit-autograph operation. However, when Wally proves to be hardly the world's greatest name-speller (as that baseball signed by "Ron Sey" will verify), the boys' scheme collapses around their ears faster than Richie can say "Lee Israel".
7	"Readers of the Lost Art"	October 27, 1984
Richie and Wally think reading is uncool.
8	"Divorce Children’s Style"	November 3, 1984
Divorce sometimes happens, but what does it do to the kids involved?
9	"The Kimosabe Blues"	November 10, 1984
A feud between Richie and Wally threatens not only their friendship but also their grade on a joint school project.
10	"The Showoff"	November 17, 1984
Richie is terrified to perform in front of his first audience.
11	"Cousin Rita"	November 24, 1984
Wally gets a crush on Richie's teenage cousin Rita.
12	"Home Free"	December 1, 1984
Amanda reveals a traumatic incident from her past to Richie.
13	"Too Old Too Soon, Too Smart Too Late"	December 8, 1984
Richie's mother insists that he spend a whole day with his Uncle Mose...although, being Richie, he would much rather attend a local public appearance by Kareem Abdul-Jabbar.

== Production ==
Pryor's Place was broadcast on Saturdays on CBS (at 11:30 AM Eastern/10:30 AM Central) from September 15 to December 8, 1984, with repeats airing until June 15, 1985. It was replaced with reruns of another Krofft show, Land of the Lost.

== Cast ==
- Richard Pryor as Himself, Bummer, Carlotta Knows and Chills
- Akili Prince as Little Richie Pryor
- Cliffy Magee as Wallace "Wally" Walker

=== Special guest stars ===
- Kareem Abdul-Jabbar as himself (episode "Too Old Too Soon, Too Smart Too Late")
- Ron Cey as himself (episode "Sax Education")
- Scatman Crothers as Uncle Mose (episode "Too Old Too Soon, Too Smart Too Late")
- Sammy Davis Jr. as Smooth Sam (episode "To Catch a Little Thief")
- Kim Fields as Cousin Rita (episode "Cousin Rita")
- Shirley Hemphill as the Shopkeeper (episode "Sax Education")
- Pat McCormick as King Empty-Head (episode "Voyage to the Planet of the Dumb")
- Jeremy Miller (episode "Sax Education")
- Pat Morita as Joe (episode "Voyage to the Planet of the Dumb")
- Willie Nelson (episode "The Showoff")
- John Ritter (episode "The Showoff")
- Rip Taylor (episode "Sax Education")
- Lily Tomlin (episode "Cousin Rita")
- Robin Williams as Gabby (episode "Sax Education")
- Henry Winkler as himself (episode "Home Free")

=== Recurring cast ===
- Marla Gibbs as Ms. Stern (episodes "Voyage to the Planet of the Dumb," "Kimosabe Blues," "Sax Education")
- Milt Kogan as Solly (episodes "To Catch a Little Thief" and "High Noon at 5:30 p.m.")

=== Guest stars ===
- Danny Ponce as Charlie (episode "Voyage to the Planet of the Dumb")
- Danny Nucci as Freddy (episode "Voyage to the Planet of the Dumb")
- Angela Lee as Sheri (episode "Voyage to the Planet of the Dumb")
- Patty Maloney as Dummy #1 (episode "Voyage to the Planet of the Dumb")
- Jimmy Briscoe as Dummy #3 (episode "Voyage to the Planet of the Dumb")
- Tony Cox as Allen/Dummy #2 (episode "Voyage to the Planet of the Dumb")
- Spring Mooney as Denise (episode "Cousin Rita")
- Lily Mariye as Lily (episode "Cousin Rita")
- Regina Hooks as Regina (episode "Cousin Rita")
- Stephen Rumph as Jake (episode "To Catch a Little Thief")
- E. Hampton Beagle as Anything Shop Owner (episode "To Catch a Little Thief")
- Chez Lister as J.D. (episode "To Catch a Little Thief")
- Carol Lipin as Woman in Prison (episode "To Catch a Little Thief")
- Keland Love as Meatrack (episode "High Noon at 5:30 p.m.")
- Elliot Sarkin as Ronny Chung (episode "High Noon at 5:30 p.m.")
- Scooter Stevens as Kid #1 (episode "High Noon at 5:30 p.m."), Sid (episode "Kimosabe Blues")
- Leanne Richelle as Patty (episode "Kimosabe Blues")
- Sean Garrett McFrazier as Marty (episode "Kimosabe Blues")

=== Puppeteers ===
- Carl Johnson
- Wayne Kaatz
- Michael Sheehan
- Van Snowden
- Allan Trautman
- Harry Waters
- Wendee Winters

== Home media ==
Four VHS videotapes of the show were released between September 1997 and June 1998 by Rhino Entertainment, each containing one episode of the series.
