= Richard Pryor: Live on the Sunset Strip (film) =

1982 stand-up comedy film

- Theatrical release poster
- Directed by: Joe Layton
- Written by: Paul Mooney; Richard Pryor
- Produced by: Richard Pryor
- Starring: Richard Pryor; Gene Cross; Julie Hampton
- Cinematography: Haskell Wexler
- Edited by: Sheldon Kahn
- Production companies: Columbia Pictures; Rastar Pictures
- Distributed by: Columbia Pictures
- Release date: March 12, 1982 (United States)
- Running time: 82 minutes
- Country: United States
- Language: English
- Budget: $4.5 million
- Box office: $36,299,720 ($121 million in 2025 dollars)

Richard Pryor: Live on the Sunset Strip is a 1982 American stand-up comedy film directed by Joe Layton. It stars and was produced by Richard Pryor, who also wrote the screenplay with Paul Mooney. The film was released alongside his album of the same name in 1982, and the most financially lucrative of the comedian's concert films. The material includes Pryor's frank discussion of his drug addiction and the night that he caught on fire while freebasing cocaine in 1980.

== Plot ==
The film opens with Pryor addressing his return to performing following his near-fatal 1980 accident. The set moves through a wide range of autobiographical material: Pryor recounts his upbringing in his grandmother's brothel in Peoria, Illinois, his early career performing at Mafia-run nightclubs, and his tumultuous romantic relationships.

A significant portion of the performance focuses on Pryor's trip to Africa, which he describes as a transformative experience. Pryor demonstrates his signature physical comedy with impressions of African wildlife. He reflects on being surrounded by Black people in positions of power for the first time and announces his decision to stop using the N-word in his comedy.

An audience member asks Pryor to perform "Mudbone," an elderly storyteller. Pryor agrees, vowing it would be Mudbone's final public appearance. The routine was entirely improvised during the filming.

The performance builds to its climax with Pryor's extended routine about his drug addiction. He personifies his crack pipe as a seductive, manipulative character, dramatizing his internal struggle with substance abuse. The final segment recounts the freebasing accident itself, his hospitalization, and his recovery, blending harrowing detail with dark humor.

== Cast ==
- Richard Pryor as himself
- Gene Cross as Stoned Hippie
- Julie Hampton as herself
- Jesse Jackson as himself (audience member, uncredited)

== Production ==
The film cost $4.5 million of which $3 million went to Pryor.

== Topics/ Scenes in order ==
1. Start
2. Sex
3. Greed & money
4. Lawyers
5. Cool Clothes
6. Married
7. Quiet mad
8. Feelings
9. Heartbreak
10. Arizona State Pen
11. Kidnapping
12. Nazis
13. Racist Groups
14. Ex-Thief
15. Brothels & pool halls
16. Hawaii
17. Racism
18. The Motherland
19. N Word
20. Mafia People
21. Mudbone
22. Old Friends
23. Milk & cookies
24. Junkie & his pipe
25. "Fire!"
26. The hospital
27. Finding religion
28. Richard Pryor Jokes

== Reception ==
Richard Pryor: Live on the Sunset Strip grossed $36.3 million, the highest-grossing concert film of all-time until it was surpassed by Eddie Murphy Raw in 1988. It received mixed reviews.

Roger Ebert rated Richard Pryor: Live on the Sunset Strip four out of four stars, describing it as a "breathtaking performance" by a comedian who had returned from the brink of self-destruction. He noted Pryor's initial nervousness but observed that, as the performance progressed, Pryor transformed into an "older, wiser, and funnier" version of himself, delivering extraordinary comedy and self-reflection. Ebert highlighted the brilliance of Pryor's vignettes, including a Mafia nightclub skit and physical comedy inspired by African wildlife, culminating in a final segment he called "one of the most remarkable marriages of comedy and truth I have ever seen." He concluded, "It is good we still have him. He is better than ever."

Writing in Commentary, conservative reviewer Richard Grenier saw Pryor's performance as embodying, and as forcing White audiences to accept and respect, an urban type that was more authentic than that exemplified by other Black comedians:

. . . Pryor, on stage, plays the very caricature of the irresponsible black man, the embodiment of almost every single stereotypical trait that traditionally consigned him to the bottom of the country's social order. But he transcends the character. We have had Stepin Fetchit and Butterfly McQueen playing seemingly bonafide black idiots. We have had Bill Cosby and Dick Gregory "talking white" to white audiences. (We have even had Flip Wilson and Redd Foxx, amiable but insignificant black comics—neither here nor there.) But Richard Pryor for the first time has taken the “black” character at its socially most regressive, and made us laugh in a new way—as if behind this performance is a high intelligence.

The film scored 40% on Rotten Tomatoes based on five reviews.
