= Richard Pryor (album) =

Live album by Richard Pryor
- Released: November 1968
- Recorded: Spring and summer 1968
- Venue: Troubadour
- Genre: Comedy
- Length: 33:28
- Labels: Dove/Reprise; Omnivore Records, Stand Up! Records (reissue)
- Producers: Richard Pryor, Robert Marchese; Jennifer Lee Pryor, Reggie Collins, Cheryl Pawelski (reissue)

Richard Pryor chronology
Richard Pryor (1968)	Craps (After Hours) (1971)

Richard Pryor is the debut album by comedian Richard Pryor. It was recorded live in 1968 at the Troubadour in West Hollywood, California.

The album cover, designed by Gary Burden, was nominated for a Grammy Award.

== History ==
Richard Pryor, like his other early-1970s albums Craps (After Hours) and Live At The Comedy Store, 1973, captures Pryor during his most transformative period as a comic, when he evolved from a family-friendly comic in the mode of Bill Cosby into the challenging, politically aware comedian of his most famous albums. He had felt creatively stifled until, at the Aladdin Hotel in Las Vegas in 1967, he walked offstage mid-performance after exclaiming, "What am I doing here?" The incident hurt his career, but only temporarily; his film and TV work grew, and his new stand-up material was more true to his own voice. Although Pryor resisted overtly linking his comedy with radical politics, he could not ignore events such as the civil rights movement, and took time off for a period of intense self-education in black history and culture. Biographer Scott Saul, in the book Becoming Richard Pryor, wrote that Pryor's new work "invented a style that was as far-out as Frank Zappa and as defiant as H. Rap Brown", fueled by both countercultural irony and Black Power militancy.

However, Pryor had trouble getting that new voice on his new record. Reportedly, producer Robert Marchese and Pryor's manager Bobby Roberts clashed over Pryor's obscenity and frankness, which Roberts felt would not sell to white audiences. Frustrated at having what he felt was his best work excised, Pryor would later say he was prouder of the album's cover than its contents. Nevertheless, as University of Michigan cultural studies professor Bambi Haggins has noted, the first signs of Pryor's mature, "uncontainable and unpredictable" comic style are readily apparent on Richard Pryor—most obviously on the cover art, but also in the contentious point of view in routines like "Super Nigger."

The 2021 reissue's bonus tracks restore much of Pryor's original, more radical and hard-hitting vision, including the classic "Hippy Dippys" monologue and the 11-minute vignette "Hank's Place", which Saul called "the masterpiece of Pryor's early career."

=== Album cover ===
A collaboration between Pryor, designer Gary Burden, artist Rick Griffin, and photographer Henry Diltz, the album art for Richard Pryor was a parody of the "naked savage" covers often seen on National Geographic. Pryor, clad only in a loincloth, wore a ring in his nose and stared defiantly at the camera as he brandished a primitive-looking bow and arrow. Burden said that as a result of the cover, he received two letters: "One was a letter from the National Geographic Society’s attorneys offering to sue me for defaming their publication. The second letter was a Grammy nomination for the best album cover." The album was later re-issued with a modified cover, replacing the border of leaves with the Statue of Liberty.

== Reception ==
A 1968 review in Billboard said that "The humor of Richard Pryor, familiar through his many TV appearances, is captured hilariously. As the cover indicates, the humor is wild, but it always hits its mark."

Reviewing the album in 2023, Den of Geek writer Tony Sokol said that "Pryor created a new style in American comedy. It was truly unprecedented." He praised Pryor's improvisational approach on the bonus tracks, saying that "Pryor holds open conversations, and makes deep connections with the audience." Joe Marchese of The Second Disc called the album "an auspicious introduction for one of the most significant and influential stand-up comedians of all time".

== Releases ==
Richard Pryor was originally released in 1968 on Dove/Reprise.

Omnivore Recordings released an expanded edition in 2021 with bonus material selected from the box set Evolution/Revolution: The Early Years. Liner notes for the reissues were written by Scott Saul, author of the biography Becoming Richard Pryor. It was re-released on vinyl by Stand Up! Records on May 26, 2023, as a double album, with the bonus tracks on the second disc. The reissues feature Burden's original album cover.

== Track listing ==
Disc one, side one
No.	Title	Length
1.	"Super Nigger"	3:16
2.	"Girls"	3:25
3.	"Farting"	2:02
4.	"Prison Play"	9:12

Disc one, side two
No.	Title	Length
5.	"T.V. Panel Show"	7:09
6.	"Smells"	2:43
7.	"Army Life"	4:48
8.	"Frankenstein"	0:56

Disc two: Bonus tracks
No.	Title	Length
9.	"Peoria"
10.	"Improv Pt. 1"
11.	"Heart and Brain"
12.	"Taxi Cabs and Subways"
13.	"Playboy Club"
14.	"Rumpelstiltskin"
15.	"Slippin' in Poo Poo"
16.	"Birth Control"
17.	"N---er Babies"
18.	"Faith Healer"
19.	"Black Power"
20.	"I Feel"
21.	"Jail"
22.	"Directions"
23.	"Movie Stars in the Bathroom"
24.	"War Movies"
25.	"The Army"
26.	"Hippy Dippys"
27.	"Hank's Place"
28.	"Improv Pt. 2"
29.	"Mankind"

- Tracks 1–8 from Richard Pryor (Dove/Reprise, 1968) Recorded at The Troubadour, West Hollywood, California (spring and summer 1968)
- Tracks 9–29 from Evolution/Revolution: The Early Years (1966–1974) (Rhino, 2005) Tracks 9–10 recorded at the hungry i, San Francisco (2/66); 11, 14 & 20–29 recorded at the Troubadour (4/68, 7/26–29/68); 12–13 recorded at unknown venue (7/15/67); 5–19 recorded at P.J.’s, Hollywood (5/24–25/68)

== Credits ==
- Executive producers: Hal Landers, Bobby Roberts
- Original producers: Richard Pryor, Robert Marchese
- Known original producers (bonus tracks): Richard Pryor, Robert Marchese
- Compilation produced by Reggie Collins & Steve Pokorny (bonus tracks)
- Reissue producers: Jennifer Lee Pryor, Reggie Collins and Cheryl Pawelski
- Original album art direction/cover design: Gary Burden
- Remastered by Michael Graves
- Reissue art direction and design: Greg Allen
- Liner notes by Scott Saul
