= Richard Pryor: Here and Now =

1983 film by Richard Pryor

- Directed by: Richard Pryor
- Written by: Richard Pryor
- Produced by: Andy Friendly; Bob Parkinson; Jeff Scheftel
- Starring: Richard Pryor; Paul Mooney
- Cinematography: Joe Epperson; Tom Green; Dave Landry; Kenneth Patterson; John Simmons; Vince Singletary
- Edited by: Raymond M. Bush
- Music by: Jimmy Jam; Terry Lewis
- Production company: Delphi Films
- Distributed by: Columbia Pictures
- Release date: October 28, 1983
- Running time: 83 minutes
- Language: English

Richard Pryor: Here and Now is a 1983 American stand-up comedy concert film starring, written and directed by Richard Pryor. The film was released in the United States on October 28, 1983.

== Synopsis ==
The film begins with street interviews of the audience waiting to get inside intercut with footage of Pryor preparing to go onstage. The set relies heavily on crowd work, starting with Pryor's ribbing of latecomers. The audience heckle, cheer, and goad Pryor who usually manages to retain the upper hand. Several audience members simply approach the stage to personally interact with him.

Pryor discusses his trip to Zimbabwe and his experience seeing lions in their natural habitat. He discusses meeting Ronald Reagan at the White House for a screening of Superman III. He reprises his character Mudbone.

At one point, an audience member brings him a cup with a live crab in it. Unfazed, Pryor puts the crab on his stool and starts impersonating it. He eventually hands the crab to a stagehand, vowing to release it back in the ocean.

After discussing his nascent sobriety, he performs an extended impersonation of being drunk. He laments being reminded of women he slept with and things he did while high. He recalls a drug user from his childhood, and then imitates shooting heroin. His set ends with a brief meditation on using the bathroom while being famous.

== Production ==
The massive success of Live on the Sunset Strip in 1982 prompted Columbia Pictures to throw $40 million at Richard Pryor for a five-year production deal. He formed Indigo Productions and hired Jim Brown to run it. They previously worked together when Brown ran out of money in the Philippines while producing Pacific Inferno (1979). Pryor provided the emergency funds necessary to finish the film. After Pryor's 1980 suicide attempt, Brown was instrumental in Pryor's recovery and held his power of attorney.

Brown wanted to replicate the eclectic productions of Desilu with Black talent. Pryor was largely disinterested, and Here and Now was the only film Indigo actually produced before Brown was fired.

In Live on the Sunset Strip, Pryor claims to be newly sober. In Here and Now, he says he has not had drugs or alcohol for seven months, which would imply a relapse of some kind. Pryor habitually lied about his sobriety and drug use.

== Soundtrack ==
The stand-up comedy album Here and Now was released by Warner Records. Recorded at Saenger Theatre in New Orleans, Louisiana, it was released alongside the film.

== Critical reception ==
The film received mostly positive reviews from critics. Janet Maslin of The New York Times said in her review, "Together with his relentlessly bawdy wit and his brilliant physical mimicry, this makes him a concert performer of seemingly endless range."

Film critic Roger Ebert rated the film four out of four stars and wrote, "Pryor works off issues and subjects that are absolutely current, and he addresses them with a humor that is aimed so well, we duck." One critic described Pryor's nuanced impersonation of a heroin user as "both hilarious and poignant" and a highlight of the set. Here and Now has been described as Pryor's "most compelling" concert film where the performer is in "peak form".

Negative views of the film see Pryor as a pallid echo of his former self, a "man who once possessed genius". In Bright Lights Film Journal, the comedian in Here and Now is described as a "laundered Pryor" who is unable to pull off his former act.

The film scores 86% on Rotten Tomatoes based on seven reviews.
