= Richard Pryor: Live on the Sunset Strip =

Live on the Sunset Strip

Live album by Richard Pryor
- Released: March 24, 1982
- Recorded: 1981–1982 (see below)
- Genre: Comedy
- Length: 59:53
- Label: Warner Bros.
- Producer: Richard Pryor, Biff Dawes

Richard Pryor chronology
Wanted: Live in Concert (1978)	Live on the Sunset Strip (1982)	Richard Pryor: Here and Now (1983)

Professional ratings
Review scores
Source	Rating
AllMusic	5/5 stars

Richard Pryor: Live on the Sunset Strip is the seventeenth album by American comedian Richard Pryor. Produced by Pryor and Biff Dawes, the album was released alongside the comedian's film of the same name in 1982. The material includes Pryor's frank discussion of his drug addiction and of the night that he caught on fire while freebasing cocaine in 1980. The album later won the Grammy Award for Best Comedy Recording in 1982.

== Track listing ==
1. "Women" – 11:24
2. "Prison" – 6:25
3. "Africa" – 10:33
4. "Mafia Club" – 6:04
5. "Mudbone" – 7:38 from Tupelo, Mississippi
6. "Freebase" – 8:12
7. "Hospital" – 10:17

=== Recording locations ===
- Tracks 1–4 and 6–7 recorded at the Circle Star Theater in San Carlos, California, December 1981 (except track 3, recorded in October 1981).
- Track 5 recorded at The Hollywood Palladium in Hollywood, California, January 5, 1982.
- Location recording by Wally Heider Recording, engineers Biff Dawes, Jack Crymes and Bill Broms.
