= ...Is It Something I Said? =

Live album by Richard Pryor
- Released: July 25, 1975
- Recorded: May 26, 1975
- Venues: Latin Casino, Cherry Hill, New Jersey
- Genre: Comedy
- Length: 45:07
- Label: Reprise
- Producer: David Banks

Richard Pryor chronology
That Nigger's Crazy (1974)	...Is It Something I Said? (1975)	L.A. Jail (1976)

Professional ratings
Review scores
Source	Rating
AllMusic	3/5 stars
Christgau's Record Guide	A

...Is It Something I Said? is the fourth album by Richard Pryor and the first he released on a new contract with Warner Bros. Records, through its subsidiary Reprise Records. He remained with the parent label for the rest of his recording career.

Recorded at the Latin Casino in Cherry Hill, New Jersey, the album is notable for being the recorded debut of Pryor's memorable Mudbone, a rural Peorian teller of tall tales.

== Content ==
The disc's label credits the track "Just Us" as being "stolen" by Paul Mooney, Pryor's friend and collaborator. The album was recorded by Wally Heider Recording, and engineered by Biff Dawes and Charles Carver.

In 1976, the album won the Grammy Award for Best Comedy Recording.

The album was the first Richard Pryor record to be remastered and reissued on compact disc. The album appears as part of the ...And It's Deep Too! box set, with a bonus track, "Ali" (that first appeared on Richard Pryor's Greatest Hits) appended to the album.

== Track listing ==
All tracks written by Richard Pryor, except where noted.

No.	Title	Writer(s)	Length
1.	"Eulogy"		3:50
2.	"Shortage of White People"		1:24
3.	"New Niggers"		4:00
4.	"Cocaine"		4:10
5.	"Just Us"	Paul Mooney	3:49
6.	"Mudbone – Intro"		5:45
7.	"Mudbone – Little Feets"		11:50
8.	"When Your Woman Leaves You"		6:30
9.	"The Goodnight Kiss"		1:48
10.	"Women Are Beautiful"		0:53
11.	"Our Text for Today"		3:48

"Ali" is a bonus routine released as track 12 on some CD reissues.

== Certifications ==
Region	Certification	Certified units/sales
United States (RIAA)	Platinum	1,000,000^{^}
^{^} Shipments figures based on certification alone.

== See also ==
- List of Billboard number-one R&B albums of 1975
