= Richard Pryor =

American comedian and actor (1940–2005)

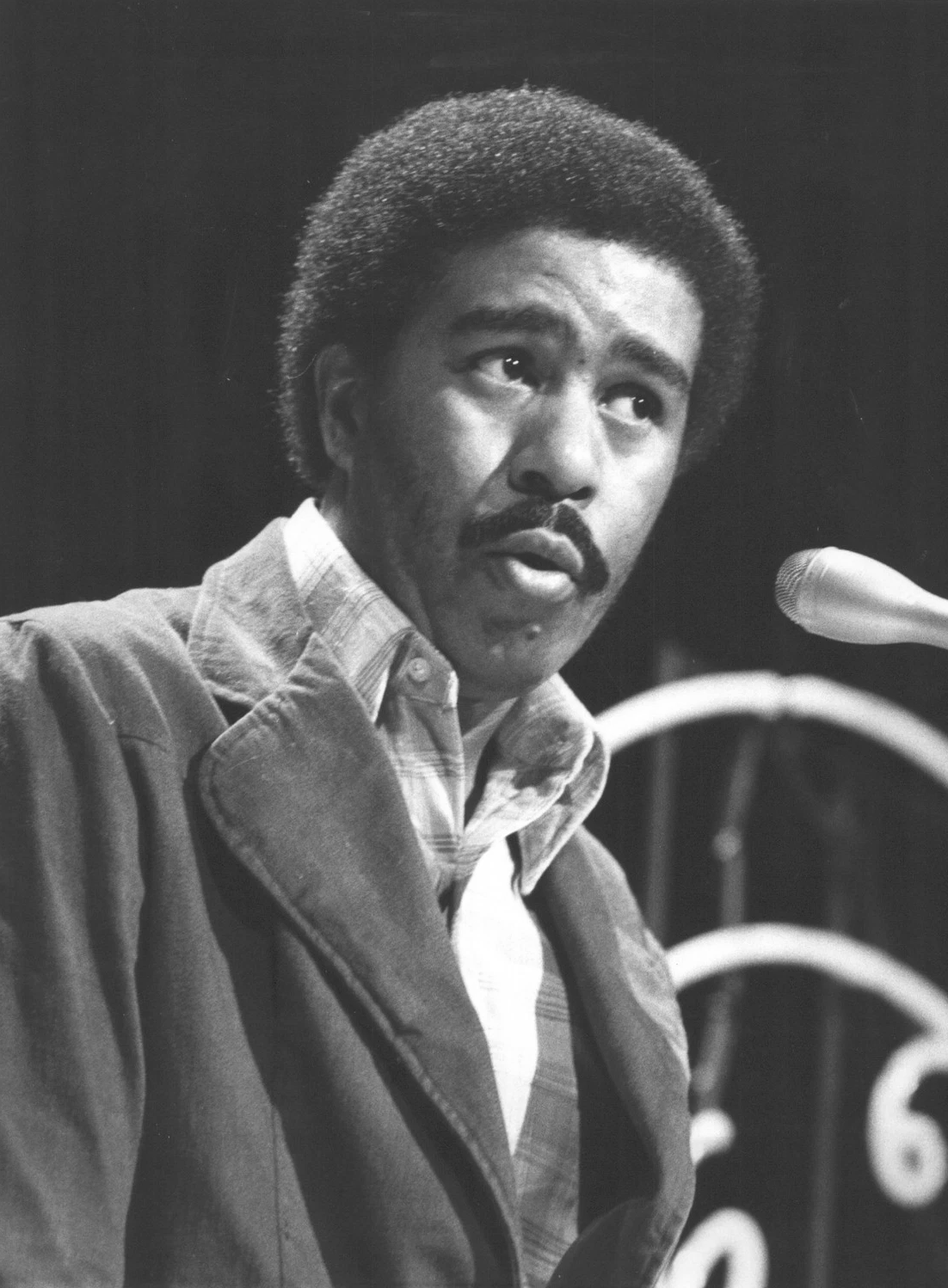
- Pryor in 1974
- Born: Richard Franklin Lennox Thomas Pryor; December 1, 1940; Peoria, Illinois, U.S.
- Died: December 10, 2005 (aged 65); Los Angeles, California, U.S.
- Spouses: Patricia Price (m. 1960; div. 1961) Shelley R. Bonus (m. 1967; div. 1969) Deborah McGuire (m. 1977; div. 1978) Jennifer Lee (m. 1981; div. 1982) (m. 2001) Flynn Belaine (m. 1986; div. 1987) (m. 1990; div. 1991)
- Children: 7, including Elizabeth and Rain

Comedy career
- Years active: 1963–1999
- Medium: Stand-up; film; television
- Genres: Observational comedy; black comedy; improvisational comedy; sketch comedy; racial humor
- Subjects: African-American culture; American politics; race relations; sex; pop culture; self-deprecation; recreational drug use
- Website: richardpryor.com

Richard Franklin Lennox Thomas Pryor (December 1, 1940 – December 10, 2005) was an American stand-up comedian and actor. Known for reaching a broad audience with his trenchant observations and storytelling style, he is regarded as one of the greatest and most influential comedians ever. Pryor won a Primetime Emmy Award and five Grammy Awards. He received the first Kennedy Center Mark Twain Prize for American Humor in 1998. He won the Writers Guild of America Award in 1974.

Pryor's body of work includes numerous concert films and recordings. He won the Grammy Award for Best Comedy Album for That Nigger's Crazy (1974), ...Is It Something I Said? (1975), Bicentennial Nigger (1976), Richard Pryor: Live on the Sunset Strip (1982), and Richard Pryor: Here and Now (1983). He is also known for Richard Pryor: Live & Smokin' (1971), Wanted: Live in Concert (1978), and Richard Pryor: Live in Concert (1979). Pryor served as a co-writer for the Mel Brooks satirical western comedy film Blazing Saddles (1974).

As an actor, he starred mainly in comedies. He gained acclaim for his collaborations with Gene Wilder, including the films Silver Streak (1976), Stir Crazy (1980), See No Evil, Hear No Evil (1989), and Another You (1991). He also acted in films such as Uptown Saturday Night (1974), Blue Collar (1978), The Wiz (1978), California Suite (1978), Superman III (1983), Harlem Nights (1989), and Lost Highway (1997). He appeared as himself on Sesame Street and Saturday Night Live before hosting The Richard Pryor Show (1977), and Pryor's Place (1984).

== Early life ==
Pryor was born on December 1, 1940, in Peoria, Illinois, and grew up in a brothel run by his grandmother, Marie Carter. His mother, Gertrude L. (née Thomas), was a prostitute. His father, LeRoy "Buck Carter" Pryor (June 7, 1915 – September 27, 1968), was a former boxer, hustler and pimp. After Gertrude lost custody of him in court when he was 10, Pryor was raised primarily by his grandmother Marie, a tall, strict woman who would slap him for any of his eccentricities but was still much loved by Richard. Pryor was one of four children raised in his grandmother's brothel. He was sexually abused at age seven and was expelled from school at the age of 14. Fortunately, he met Juliette Whittaker, the head of the Carver Center's theater program and the center's resident bohemian, at this formative juncture in his life. Juliette learned to live by the motto “You shoot for the moon, you’re bound to hit a star, but if you never shoot, you’ll never hit anything. You’ve got to aim.”

Pryor served in the U.S. Army from 1958 to 1960. He spent virtually the entire stint in an Army prison. According to a 1999 profile in The New Yorker, Pryor was incarcerated for an incident that occurred while he was stationed in West Germany. Angered that a white soldier was overly amused at the racially charged scenes of Douglas Sirk's film Imitation of Life, Pryor and several other black soldiers beat and stabbed him; the soldier survived.

== Career ==
=== Early performances ===
Harold's Club (early 1960s):

[W]hen Harold came up to me backstage, I still had sweat pouring off me. 'You've got more nerve than anybody I've ever seen,' he said. 'Would you like to keep coming?'

— Richard Pryor, on his debut as a performer at Harold's Club

New York City (1963–1969):

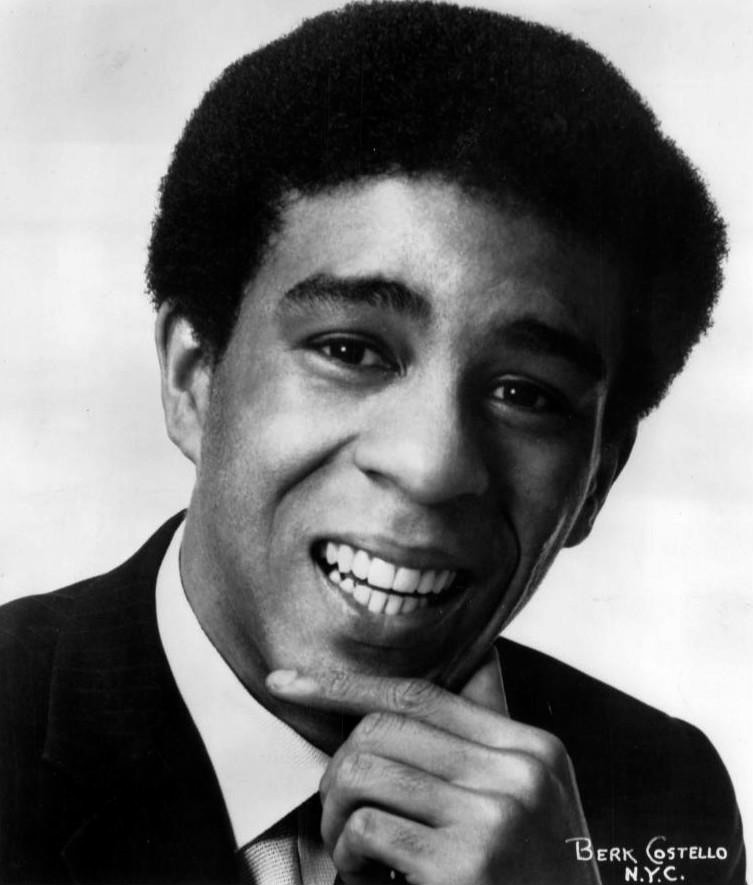
Publicity photo of Pryor for one of his Mister Kelly's appearances, 1968–1969

In 1963, Pryor moved to New York City and began performing regularly in clubs alongside performers such as Bob Dylan and Woody Allen. On one of his first nights, he opened for singer and pianist Nina Simone at New York's Village Gate. Simone recalls Pryor's bout of performance anxiety:

He shook like he had malaria, he was so nervous. I couldn't bear to watch him shiver, so I put my arms around him there in the dark and rocked him like a baby until he calmed down. The next night was the same, and the next, and I rocked him each time.

Initially inspired by Bill Cosby, Pryor began as a middlebrow comic, with material less controversial than what was to come. He began appearing regularly on television variety shows such as The Ed Sullivan Show, The Merv Griffin Show, and The Tonight Show Starring Johnny Carson. His popularity led to success as a comic in Las Vegas. The first five tracks on the 2005 compilation CD Evolution/Revolution: The Early Years (1966–1974), recorded in 1966 and 1967, capture Pryor in this period. In 1966, Pryor was a guest star on an episode of The Wild Wild West.

In September 1967, Pryor had what he described in his autobiography Pryor Convictions (1995) as an "epiphany". He walked onto the stage at the Aladdin Hotel in Las Vegas (with Dean Martin in the audience), looked at the sold-out crowd, exclaimed over the microphone, "What the fuck am I doing here!?", and walked off the stage. Afterward, Pryor began working profanity into his act, including the word nigger. His first comedy recording, the 1968 debut Richard Pryor on the Dove/Reprise label, captures this particular period, tracking the evolution of Pryor's routine. His parents died—his mother in 1967 and his father in 1968.

By 1968, Pryor had broken with Cosby's style of comedy and became more controversial.

In 1969, Pryor moved to Berkeley, California, where he immersed himself in the counterculture and met people like Huey P. Newton and Ishmael Reed.

=== 1970–1979: Breakthrough and acclaim ===
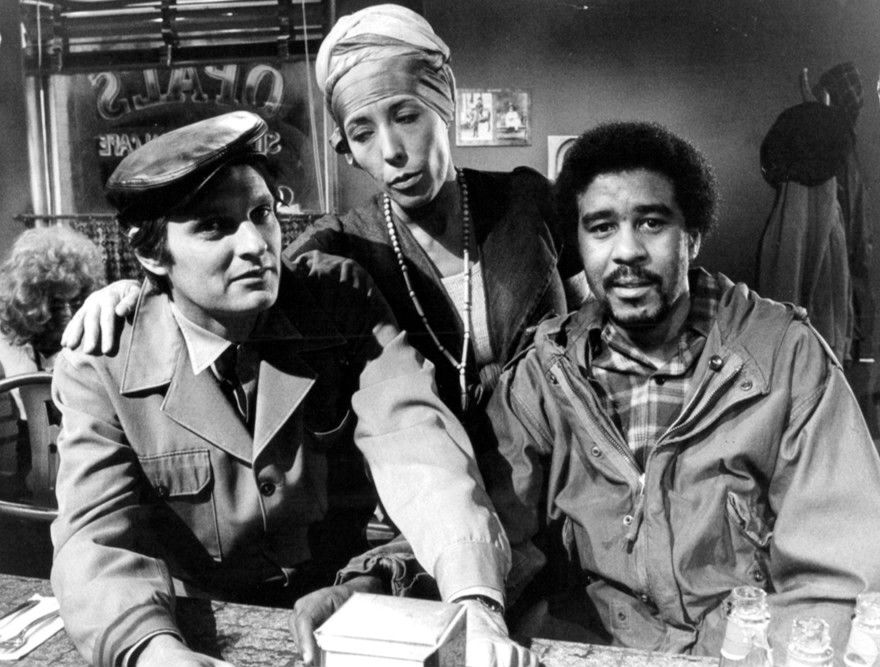
Pryor performed in the Lily Tomlin specials. He is seen here with Tomlin and Alan Alda in Tomlin's 1973 special.

In the 1970s, Pryor wrote for television shows such as Sanford and Son, The Flip Wilson Show, and a 1973 Lily Tomlin special, for which he shared an Emmy Award. During this period, Pryor tried to break into mainstream television. He appeared in several films, including Lady Sings the Blues (1972), The Mack (1973), Uptown Saturday Night (1974), Silver Streak (1976), Car Wash (1976), The Bingo Long Traveling All-Stars & Motor Kings (1976), Which Way Is Up? (1977), Greased Lightning (1977), Blue Collar (1978), and The Muppet Movie (1979).

Pryor signed with the comedy-oriented independent record label Laff Records in 1970, and in 1971 recorded his second album, Craps (After Hours). Two years later Pryor, still relatively unknown, appeared in the documentary Wattstax (1972), wherein he riffed on the tragic-comic absurdities of race relations in Watts and the United States. Not long afterward, Pryor sought a deal with a larger label, and he signed with Stax Records in 1973. When his third breakthrough album That Nigger's Crazy (1974) was released, Laff, which claimed ownership of Pryor's recording rights, almost succeeded in getting an injunction to prevent the album from being sold. Negotiations led to Pryor's release from his Laff contract. In return for this concession, Laff was enabled to release previously unissued material, recorded between 1968 and 1973, at will. That Nigger's Crazy was a commercial and critical success; it was eventually certified gold by the RIAA and won the Grammy Award for Best Comedy Album at the 1975 Grammy Awards.

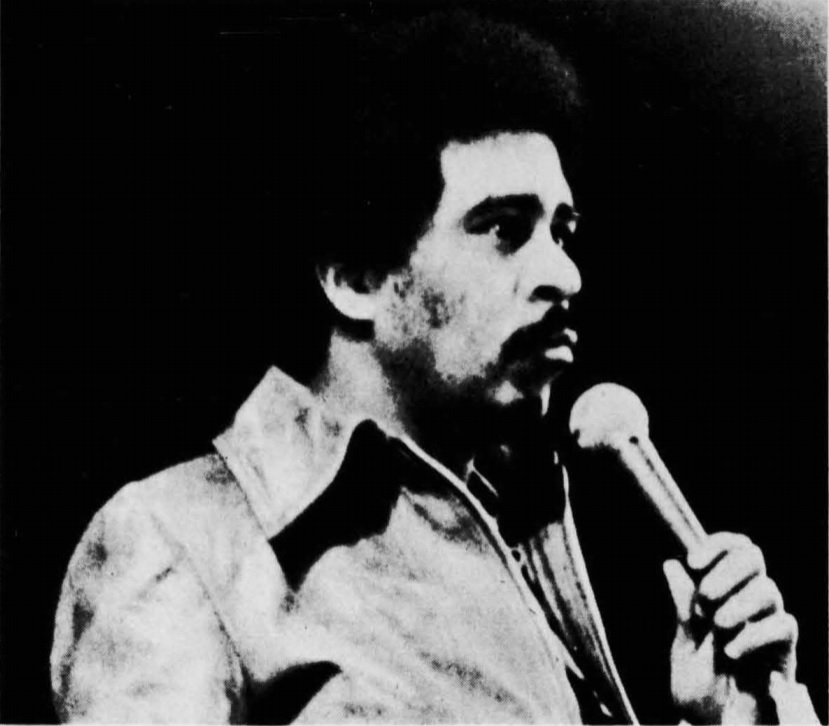
Pryor performing in 1974

During the legal battle, Stax briefly closed its doors. At this time, Pryor returned to Reprise/Warner Bros. Records, which re-released That Nigger's Crazy, immediately after ...Is It Something I Said?, his first album with his new label. Like That Nigger's Crazy, the album was a critical success; it was eventually certified platinum by the RIAA and won the Grammy Award for Best Comedy Recording at the 1976 Grammy Awards.

Pryor's 1976 release Bicentennial Nigger continued his streak of success. It became his third consecutive gold album, and he collected his third consecutive Grammy for Best Comedy Recording for the album in 1977. With every successful album Pryor recorded for Warner (or later, his concert films and his 1980 freebasing accident), Laff published an album of older material to capitalize on Pryor's growing fame—a practice they continued until 1983. The covers of Laff albums tied in thematically with Pryor films, such as Are You Serious? for Silver Streak (1976), The Wizard of Comedy for his appearance in The Wiz (1978), and Insane for Stir Crazy (1980). Pryor co-wrote Blazing Saddles (1974), directed by Mel Brooks and starring Gene Wilder. Pryor was to play the lead role of Bart, but Mel Brooks didn't want to share credit with the quickly-rising comic. Brooks has always maintained Warner Brothers' executives vetoed Pryor's casting, but no studio executive has ever corroborated this claim. It was only after Pryor's death (in 2005) that Brooks began insisting the comic was "uninsurable" because of a "drug arrest;" but to date, no studio executive employed at Warner Brothers during this era has ever gone on the record to corroborate these assertions—either the director's vigorously advocating or the studio's absolute rejection for hiring Pryor to act in Blazing Saddles. According to director Michael Shultz, "Richard wrote it and Mel Brooks chased him out," Shultz said at the time (during the film's theatrical exhibition). "Mel Brooks was trying to get total credit for the picture. . . . To be outmaneuvered and ripped off at that early stage in his career is something that's a little hard for him to get over. I'd feel the same way." Moreover, Brooks assured Pryor that the role of Sheriff Bart was his, but after Pryor departed the director's writer's suite, he never heard from Brooks again. In early-1972, Pryor was reportedly dumbfounded when he had to first learn from Cleavon Little that Brooks wasn't going to use him on-screen.

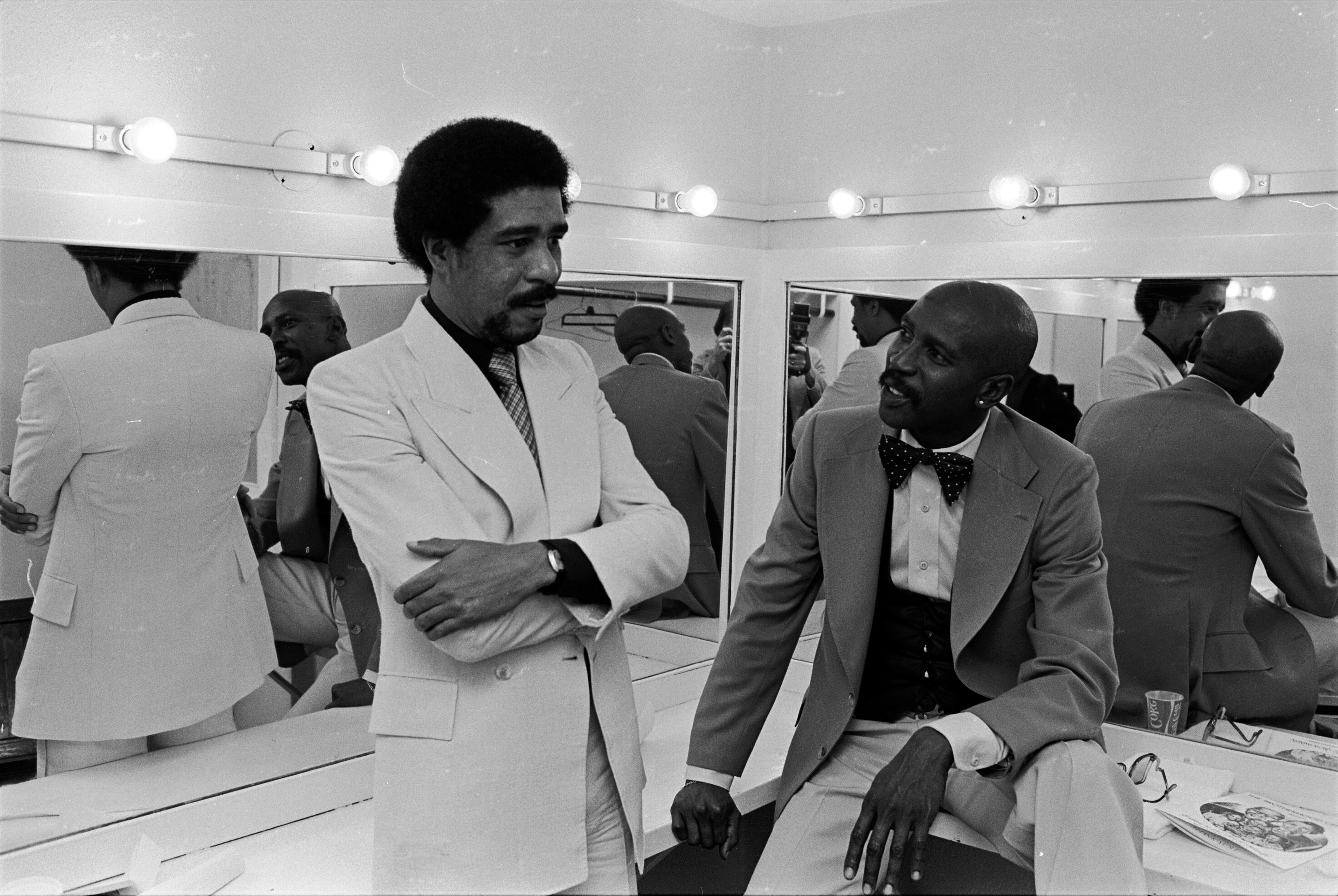
Pryor with Lou Gossett Jr. in 1978

In 1975, Pryor was a guest host on the first season of Saturday Night Live (SNL), making him the first black host. Pryor's longtime girlfriend, actress and talk-show host Kathrine McKee (sister of Lonette McKee), made a brief guest appearance with Pryor on SNL. One of the highlights of the night was the controversial "word association" skit with Chevy Chase. He later did his own variety show, The Richard Pryor Show, which premiered on NBC in 1977. The show was cancelled after only four episodes, probably because television audiences did not respond well to his show's controversial subject matter, and Pryor was unwilling to alter his material for network censors. He later said, "They offered me ten episodes, but I said all I wanted to in four." During the short-lived series, he portrayed the first black President of the United States, spoofed the Star Wars Mos Eisley cantina, examined gun violence in a non-comedy skit, lampooned racism on the sinking Titanic, and used costumes and visual distortion to appear nude. In 1979, at the height of his success, Pryor visited Kenya. Upon returning to the United States from Africa, Pryor swore he would never use the word "nigger" in his stand-up comedy routine again.

=== 1980–1989: Established career ===
In 1980, Pryor became the first black actor to earn a million dollars for a single film when he was hired to star in Stir Crazy. On June 9, 1980, while on a freebasing binge during the making of the film, Pryor doused himself in rum and set himself on fire. Pryor incorporated a description of the incident into his comedy show Richard Pryor: Live on the Sunset Strip (1982). He joked that the event was caused by dunking a cookie into a glass of low-fat and pasteurized milk, causing an explosion. At the end of the bit, he poked fun at people who told jokes about it by waving a lit match and saying, "What's that? Richard Pryor running down the street."

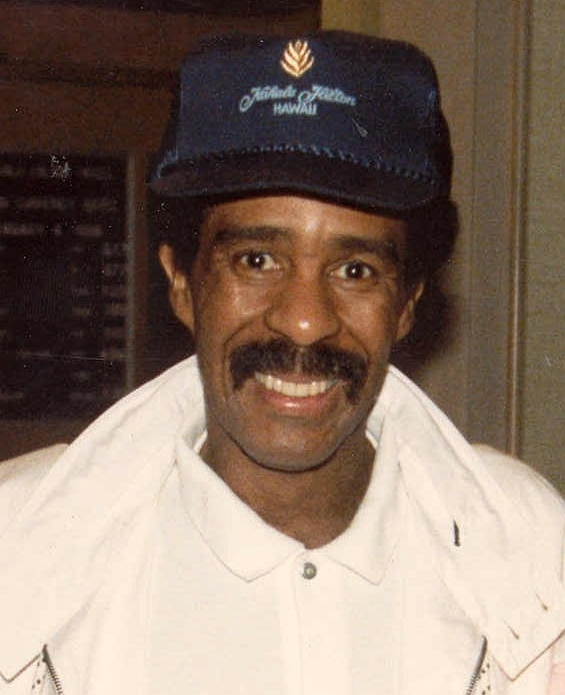
Pryor in 1986

Before the freebasing incident, Pryor was about to start filming Mel Brooks' History of the World, Part I (1981), but was replaced at the last minute by Gregory Hines. Likewise, Pryor was scheduled for an appearance on The Muppet Show at that time, which forced the producers to cast their British writer, Chris Langham, as the guest star for that episode instead. After his "final performance", Pryor did not stay away from stand-up comedy for long. Within a year, he filmed and released a new concert film and accompanying album, Richard Pryor: Here and Now (1983), which he directed himself. He wrote and directed a fictionalized account of his life, Jo Jo Dancer, Your Life Is Calling, which was inspired by the 1980 freebasing incident.

In 1983 Pryor signed a five-year contract with Columbia Pictures for $40 million and he started his own production company, Indigo Productions. Softer, more formulaic films followed, including Superman III (1983), which earned Pryor $4 million, Brewster's Millions (1985), Moving (1988), and See No Evil, Hear No Evil (1989). The only film project from this period that recalled his rough roots was Pryor's semiautobiographic debut as a writer-director, Jo Jo Dancer, Your Life Is Calling, which was not a major success. Pryor was also originally considered for the role of Billy Ray Valentine in Trading Places (1983), before Eddie Murphy won the part. Despite his reputation for constantly using profanity on and off camera, Pryor briefly hosted a children's show on CBS called Pryor's Place (1984). Like Sesame Street (where Pryor appeared in a few oft-repeated segments), Pryor's Place featured a cast of puppets (animated by Sid and Marty Krofft), hanging out and having fun in a friendly inner-city environment along with several children and characters portrayed by Pryor himself. Its theme song was performed by Ray Parker Jr. Pryor's Place frequently dealt with more sobering issues than Sesame Street. It was cancelled shortly after its debut.

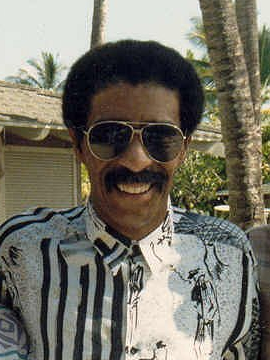
Pryor in February 1986

Pryor co-hosted the Academy Awards twice—the 49th Academy Awards in 1977 with Warren Beatty, Ellen Burstyn, and Jane Fonda and again at the 55th Academy Awards in 1983 alongside Liza Minnelli, Dudley Moore, and Walter Matthau. He was also nominated for a Primetime Emmy Award for Outstanding Guest Actor in a Drama Series on the television series Chicago Hope. Network censors had warned Pryor about his profanity for the Academy Awards, and after a slip early in the program, a five-second delay was instituted when returning from a commercial break. Pryor is one of only three Saturday Night Live hosts to be subjected to a five-second delay (along with Sam Kinison in 1986 and Andrew Dice Clay in 1990).

Pryor developed a reputation for being demanding and disrespectful on film sets, and for making selfish and difficult requests. In his autobiography Kiss Me Like a Stranger, co-star Gene Wilder says that Pryor was frequently late to the set during filming of Stir Crazy, and that he demanded, among other things, a helicopter to fly him to and from set because he was the star. Pryor was accused of using allegations of on-set racism to force the hand of film producers into giving him more money:

One day during our lunch hour in the last week of filming, the craft service man handed out slices of watermelon to each of us. Richard, the whole camera crew, and I sat together in a big sound studio eating a number of watermelon slices, talking and joking. As a gag, some members of the crew used a piece of watermelon as a Frisbee, and tossed it back and forth to each other. One piece of watermelon landed at Richard's feet. He got up and went home. Filming stopped. The next day, Richard announced that he knew very well what the significance of watermelon was. He said that he was quitting show business and would not return to this film. The day after that, Richard walked in, all smiles. I wasn't privy to all the negotiations that went on between Columbia and Richard's lawyers, but the camera operator who had thrown that errant piece of watermelon had been fired that day. I assume now that Richard was using drugs during Stir Crazy.

Pryor appeared in Harlem Nights (1989), a comedy-drama crime film starring three generations of black comedians (Pryor, Eddie Murphy, and Redd Foxx).

=== 1990–2005: Later years and final works ===
In his later years starting in the early to mid-1990s, Pryor used a power-operated mobility scooter due to multiple sclerosis (MS). He often said that MS stood for "More Shit". He appears on the scooter in his last film appearance, a small role in David Lynch's Lost Highway (1997) playing an auto-repair garage manager named Arnie.

Rhino Records remastered all of Pryor's Reprise and WB albums for inclusion in the box set ... And It's Deep Too! The Complete Warner Bros. Recordings (1968–1992) (2000).

In December 1999, Pryor appeared in the cold open of an episode of The Norm Show entitled "Norm vs. The Boxer". He played Mr. Johnson, an elderly man in a wheelchair who has lost the rights to in-home nursing when he kept attacking the nurses before attacking Norm himself. This was his last television appearance.

In 2002, Pryor and Jennifer Lee Pryor, his wife and manager, won legal rights to all the Laff material, which amounted to almost 40 hours of reel-to-reel analog tape. After going through the tapes and getting Richard's blessing, Jennifer Lee Pryor gave Rhino Records access to the tapes in 2004. These tapes, including the entire Craps (After Hours) album, form the basis of the February 1, 2005, double-CD release Evolution/Revolution: The Early Years (1966–1974).

== Influences ==
Pryor's influences included Charlie Chaplin, Jackie Gleason, Red Skelton, Abbott and Costello, Jerry Lewis, Dean Martin, Jack Benny, Bob Hope, Woody Allen, Dick Gregory, Bill Cosby, Redd Foxx and Lenny Bruce.

== Personal life ==
Pryor met actress Pam Grier through comedian Freddie Prinze. They began dating when they were both cast in Greased Lightning (1977). Grier helped Pryor learn to read and tried to help him with his drug addiction. Pryor married another woman while dating Grier.

Pryor dated actress Margot Kidder during the filming of Some Kind of Hero (1982). Kidder stated that she "fell in love with Pryor in two seconds flat" after they first met.

=== Marriages and family ===
Pryor was married seven times to five women:

1. Patricia Price married Pryor from 1960 to 1961.
2. Shelley Bonus married Pryor from 1967 to 1969.
3. Deborah McGuire, an aspiring model and actress, married Pryor on September 22, 1977. The two dated on-and-off for four years prior to their marriage. They separated in January 1978, and their divorce was finalized in August 1978.
4. Jennifer Lee met Pryor while assisting the decorator contracted to work on his estate in August 1977. They married in August 1981 for fourteen days (after only a week together, columnist Liz Smith reported Lee had retained celebrity palimony litigator Marvin Mitchelson to represent her); their divorce was finalized in October 1982. Lee secretly remarried Pryor on June 29, 2001, nuptials that remained largely private until Pryor's death in 2005.
5. Flynn Belaine, an aspiring actress, met Pryor when he was performing in Washington, D.C., in 1984. The two married in October 1986 and Pryor filed for divorce two months later, but withdrew the petition the same day. He again filed for divorce a week later, which was finalized in July 1987. The two remarried on April 1, 1990, then divorced again in July 1991.

Children

Pryor fathered seven children with six different women:

1. Renee Pryor, born July 20, 1957; from Pryor's girlfriend named Susan, when Pryor was 16.
2. Richard Pryor Jr., born April 10, 1962; from Pryor's first wife Patricia Price.
3. Elizabeth Anne, born April 25, 1967; from Pryor's girlfriend Maxine Silverman.
4. Rain Pryor, born July 16, 1969; from Pryor's second wife Shelley Bonus.
5. Steven, born November 14, 1984; from Flynn Belaine, who later became Pryor's fifth wife.
6. Franklin, born April 29, 1987; from Pryor's girlfriend Geraldine Mason.
7. Kelsey, born October 25, 1987; from Pryor's fifth wife Flynn Belaine.

=== Sexuality ===
Nine years after Pryor's death, in 2014, the biographical book Becoming Richard Pryor by Scott Saul stated that Pryor "acknowledged his bisexuality" and, in 2018, Quincy Jones and Pryor's widow Jennifer Lee stated that Pryor had a sexual relationship with actor Marlon Brando, and that Pryor was open with his friends about his bisexuality and the fact that he slept with men. Pryor's daughter Rain later disputed the claim, to which Lee stated that Rain was in denial about her father's bisexuality.

Lee later told the Hollywood entertainment television series TMZ on TV that, "it was the '70s! Drugs were still good... If you did enough cocaine, you'd fuck a radiator and send it flowers in the morning."

In his autobiography Pryor Convictions, Pryor talked about having a two-week relationship with Mitrasha, a trans woman, which he called "two weeks of being gay."

In his first special, Live & Smokin', Pryor discusses experimenting with homosexuality. Pryor later said in 1977 at a gay rights show at the Hollywood Bowl, "I have sucked a dick." Pryor went on to say during the Hollywood Bowl show that the incident took place in 1952 (when Pryor was 11 or 12 years old) with someone named Wilbur Harp. Pryor also admitted to engaging in anal sex with Harp.

=== Substance abuse ===
Some sources (including Pryor himself) say that late in the evening of June 9, 1980, Pryor poured 151-proof rum all over himself and set himself on fire. Other sources (including the Los Angeles police) say that what burned him that night was an explosion that happened while he was freebasing cocaine. While he was still burning, he ran down Parthenia Street from his Los Angeles home until he was subdued by police. He was taken to a hospital, where he was treated for second- and third-degree burns covering more than half of his body. Pryor spent six weeks in recovery at the Grossman Burn Center at Sherman Oaks Hospital in Los Angeles. His daughter Rain stated that the incident happened as a result of a bout of drug-induced psychosis.

Pryor's widow Jennifer Lee recalled when he began freebasing cocaine: "After two weeks of watching him getting addicted to this stuff I moved out. It was clear the drug had moved in and it had become his lover and everything. I did not exist."

=== Health problems ===
In November 1977, after many years of heavy smoking and drinking, Pryor had a mild heart attack at age 36. He recovered and resumed performing in January the following year. In 1986, he was diagnosed with multiple sclerosis, which by the mid-1990s resulted in him using a mobility scooter most of the time. In 1990, Pryor had a second heart attack while in Australia. He underwent triple heart bypass surgery in 1991.

In late 2004, his sister said he had lost his voice as a result of his multiple sclerosis. However, on January 9, 2005, Pryor's wife, Jennifer Lee, rebutted this statement in a post on Pryor's official website, citing Richard as saying: "I'm sick of hearing this shit about me not talking ... not true ... I have good days, bad days ... but I still am a talkin' motherfucker!"

=== Animal activism ===
Pryor campaigned for better welfare for animals, including through involvement in a successful campaign by People for the Ethical Treatment of Animals targeting KFC, Burger King, and others for sourcing meat from suppliers that PETA claimed used inhumane practices. Pryor also fundraised for PETA and was a vegetarian.

== Death ==
On the morning of December 10, 2005, Pryor had a third and final heart attack at his house in Los Angeles. After his wife's failed attempts to resuscitate him, he was taken to a local Westside hospital, where he was pronounced dead at 7:58 a.m. PST. His widow Jennifer was quoted as saying, "At the end, there was a smile on his face."

His body was cremated, and his ashes were given to his family. His ashes were scattered in the bay at Hana, Hawaii, by his widow in 2019. Forensic pathologist Michael Hunter believes Pryor's fatal heart attack was caused by coronary artery disease that was at least partially brought about by years of tobacco smoking.

== Legacy ==
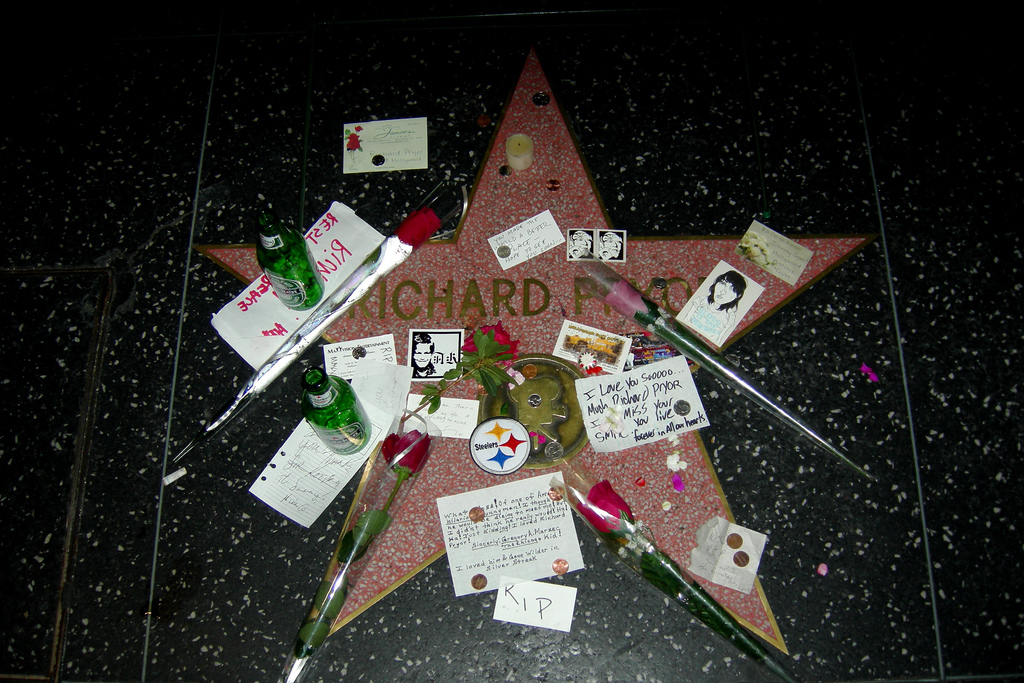
Pryor's star at the Hollywood Walk of Fame, covered with items left by fans

Jerry Seinfeld called Pryor "the Picasso of our profession" and Bob Newhart heralded Pryor as "the seminal comedian of the last 50 years". Dave Chappelle said of Pryor, "You know those, like, evolution charts of man? He was the dude walking upright. Richard was the highest evolution of comedy." This legacy can be attributed, in part, to the unusual degree of intimacy Pryor brought to bear on his comedy. As Bill Cosby reportedly once said, "Richard Pryor drew the line between comedy and tragedy as thin as one could possibly paint it."

=== Awards and honors ===
In 1998, Pryor won the first Mark Twain Prize for American Humor from the John F. Kennedy Center for the Performing Arts. According to former Kennedy Center President Lawrence J. Wilker, Pryor was selected as the first recipient of the Prize because:

as a stand-up comic, writer, and actor, he struck a chord, and a nerve, with America, forcing it to look at large social questions of race and the more tragicomic aspects of the human condition. Though uncompromising in his wit, Pryor, like Twain, projects a generosity of spirit that unites us. They were both trenchant social critics who spoke the truth, however outrageous.

He was listed at number one on Comedy Central's list of all-time greatest stand-up comedians. In 2017, Rolling Stone ranked him first on its list of the 50 best stand-up comics of all time. In a 2005 British poll to find "The Comedian's Comedian", Pryor was voted the 10th-greatest comedy act ever by fellow comedians and comedy insiders.

Pryor was posthumously awarded the Grammy Lifetime Achievement Award in 2006.

The animal rights organization PETA gives out an award in Pryor's name to people who have done outstanding work to alleviate animal suffering. Pryor was active in animal rights and was deeply concerned about the plight of elephants in circuses and zoos. In 1999, he was awarded a Humanitarian Award by the group, and worked with them on campaigns against the treatment of birds by KFC.

Artist Preston Jackson created a life-sized bronze statue in dedication to the beloved comedian and named it Richard Pryor: More than Just a Comedian. It was placed at the corner of State and Washington Streets in downtown Peoria, on May 1, 2015, close to the neighborhood in which he grew up with his mother. The unveiling was held Sunday, May 3, 2015.

In a Netflix special released in May 2022, The Hall: Honoring the Greats of Stand-Up, Pryor was inducted into the National Comedy Center in Jamestown, New York.

=== Retrospectives ===
In 2002, a television documentary entitled The Funny Life of Richard Pryor depicted Pryor's life and career. Broadcast in the UK as part of the Channel 4 series Kings of Black Comedy, it was produced, directed and narrated by David Upshal and featured rare clips from Pryor's 1960s stand-up appearances and films such as Silver Streak (1976), Blue Collar (1978), Richard Pryor: Live in Concert (1978), and Stir Crazy (1980). Contributors included George Carlin, Dave Chappelle, Whoopi Goldberg, Ice-T, Paul Mooney, Joan Rivers, and Lily Tomlin. The show tracked down the two cops who had rescued Pryor from his "freebasing incident", former managers, and even school friends from Pryor's home town of Peoria, Illinois. In the US, the show went out as part of the Heroes of Black Comedy series on Comedy Central, narrated by Don Cheadle.

A television documentary, Richard Pryor: I Ain't Dead Yet,#*%$#@!! (2003) consisted of archival footage of Pryor's performances and testimonials from fellow comedians, including Dave Chappelle, Denis Leary, Chris Rock, and Wanda Sykes, on Pryor's influence on comedy.

On December 19, 2005, BET aired a Pryor special, titled The Funniest Man Dead or Alive. It included commentary from fellow comedians, and insight into his upbringing.

A retrospective of Pryor's film work, concentrating on the 1970s, titled A Pryor Engagement, opened at Brooklyn Academy of Music Cinemas for a two-week run in February 2013. Many prolific comedians have claimed Pryor as an influence including George Carlin, Dave Attell, Martin Lawrence, Dave Chappelle, Chris Rock, Colin Quinn, Patrice O'Neal, Bill Hicks, Jerry Seinfeld, Jon Stewart, Bill Burr, Joey Diaz, Eddie Murphy, Louis C.K., and Eddie Izzard.

On May 31, 2013, Showtime debuted the documentary Richard Pryor: Omit the Logic directed by Emmy Award-winning filmmaker Marina Zenovich. The executive producers were Pryor's widow Jennifer Lee Pryor and Roy Ackerman. Interviewees included Dave Chappelle, Whoopi Goldberg, Jesse Jackson, Quincy Jones, George Lopez, Bob Newhart, Richard Pryor Jr., Lily Tomlin, and Robin Williams.

On March 12, 2019, Paramount Network debuted the documentary I Am Richard Pryor, directed by Jesse James Miller. The film included appearances by Sandra Bernhard, Lily Tomlin, Mike Epps, Howie Mandel, and Pryor's ex-wife, Jennifer Lee Pryor, among others. Jennifer Lee served as an executive producer on the film.

=== Portrayals ===
In the episode "Taxes and Death or Get Him to the Sunset Strip" (2012), the voice of Richard Pryor is played by Eddie Griffin in the satirical TV show Black Dynamite.

A planned biopic, entitled Richard Pryor: Is It Something I Said?, was being produced by Chris Rock and Adam Sandler. The film would have starred Marlon Wayans as the young Pryor. Other actors previously attached include Mike Epps and Eddie Murphy. The film would have been directed by Bill Condon and was still in development with no release date, as of February 2013.

The biopic remained in limbo, and went through several producers until it was announced in January 2014 that it was being backed by the Weinstein Company with Lee Daniels as director. It was further announced, in August 2014, that the biopic will have Oprah Winfrey as producer and will star Mike Epps as Pryor.

He is portrayed by Brandon Ford Green in Season 1 Episode 4 "Sugar and Spice" of Showtime's I'm Dying Up Here.

In the Epic Rap Battles of History episode "George Carlin vs. Richard Pryor", Pryor was portrayed by American rapper Zeale.

== Filmography ==
=== Films ===
Year	Title	Role	Notes
1967	The Busy Body	Lt. Whitaker	Film debut
1968	Wild in the Streets	Stanley X	
1969	Uncle Tom's Fairy Tales	Unknown	Also writer; uncompleted/unreleased
1970	Carter's Army	Pvt. Jonathan Crunk	TV film
1970	The Phynx	Himself	Cameo
1971	You've Got to Walk It Like You Talk It or You'll Lose That Beat	Wino	
1971	Live & Smokin'	Himself	Stand-up film; also writer
1971	Dynamite Chicken	Himself	
1972	Lady Sings the Blues	Piano Man	
1973	The Mack	Slim	
1973	Some Call It Loving	Jeff	
1973	Hit!	Mike Willmer	
1973	Wattstax	Himself / Host	
1974	Blazing Saddles		Co-writer
1974	Uptown Saturday Night	Sharp Eye Washington	
1975	Adiós Amigo	Sam Spade	
1976	The Bingo Long Traveling All-Stars & Motor Kings	Charlie Snow, All-Star (RF)	
1976	Car Wash	Daddy Rich	
1976	Silver Streak	Grover T. Muldoon	
1977	Greased Lightning	Wendell Scott	
1977	Which Way Is Up?	Leroy Jones / Rufus Jones / Reverend Lenox Thomas	Triple roles
1978	Blue Collar	Zeke Brown	
1978	The Wiz	Herman Smith (The Wiz)	
1978	California Suite	Dr. Chauncey Gump	
1979	Richard Pryor: Live in Concert	Himself	Stand-up film; also writer
1979	The Muppet Movie	Balloon Vendor	Cameo
1980	Wholly Moses!	Pharaoh	
1980	In God We Tru$t	G.O.D.	
1980	Stir Crazy	Harold "Harry" Monroe	
1981	Bustin' Loose	Joe Braxton	Also producer and writer (story)
1982	Richard Pryor: Live on the Sunset Strip	Himself	Stand-up film; also producer and writer
1982	Some Kind of Hero	Eddie Keller	
1982	The Toy	Jack Brown	
1983	Superman III	August "Gus" Gorman	
1983	Richard Pryor: Here and Now	Himself	Stand-up film; also director and writer
1985	Brewster's Millions	Montgomery "Monty" Brewster	
1986	Jo Jo Dancer, Your Life Is Calling	Jo Jo Dancer	Also director, producer and writer
1987	Critical Condition	Kevin Lenahan / Dr. Eddie Slattery	
1988	Moving	Arlo Pear	
1989	See No Evil, Hear No Evil	Wallace "Wally" Karue	
1989	Harlem Nights	Sugar Ray	
1991	Another You	Eddie Dash	
1991	The Three Muscatels	Narrator / Wino / Bartender	
1996	Mad Dog Time	Jimmy the Grave Digger	
1997	Lost Highway	Arnie	Final film role
2000	Me, Myself & Irene	Stand-up Comedian on TV	Archival footage
2007	Superbad	Himself	Archival footage

=== Television ===
Year	Title	Role	Notes
1966	The Wild Wild West	Villar	Episode: "The Night of the Eccentrics"
1967	ABC Stage 67	Undertaker	Episode: "A Time for Laughter: A Look at Negro Humor in America"
1968	Let's Go	Unknown role	Episode: "Psychedelic Vancouver"
1969	The Young Lawyers	Otis Tucker	Episode: "The Young Lawyers"
1971	The Partridge Family	A.E. Simon	Episode: "Soul Club"
1972	Mod Squad	Cat Griffin	Episode: "The Connection"
1975	Saturday Night Live	Himself/host	Episode: "Richard Pryor / Gil Scott-Heron"
1975–1978	Sesame Street	Himself	4 episodes
1977	The Richard Pryor Special?	Himself / The Reverend James L. White / Idi Amin Dada / Shoeshine Man / Willie	TV special
1977	The Richard Pryor Show	Himself / Various roles	4 episodes
1984	Pryor's Place	Himself	10 episodes
1984	Billy Joel: Keeping the Faith	Man Reading Newspaper	Video short
1993	Martin	Himself	Episode: "The Break Up: Part 1"
1995	Chicago Hope	Joe Springer	Episode: "Stand"
1996	Malcolm & Eddie	Uncle Bucky	Episode: "Do the K.C. Hustle"
1999	The Norm Show	Mr. Johnson	Episode: "Norm vs. the Boxer"

== Discography ==
=== Albums ===
Year	Title	Label	Format	Reissues
1968	Richard Pryor	Dove/Reprise	LP	1972/1976 LP, 2000 Warner Archive/Rhino CD album box set, 2021 Omnivore Recordings 2xCD/LP, 2023 Stand Up! 2xLP
1971	Craps (After Hours)	Laff	LP/cassette/8-track	1972 LP/8-track, 1983 as Blackjack LP/cassette, 1994 Loose Cannon/Island CD, 2021 Omnivore Recordings CD, 2023 Stand Up! 2xLP/LP
1974	That Nigger's Crazy	Partee/Stax	LP/8-track	1975 Reprise LP/8-track, 1978 LP/cassette/8-track, 2000 and 2013 Warner Archive/Rhino album box sets, 2025 Rhino vinyl box set
1975	...Is It Something I Said?	Reprise	LP/cassette/8-track	1976/1977 LP, 1995 CD, 2000 and 2013 Warner Archive/Rhino album box sets, 2025 Rhino vinyl box set
1976	Are You Serious???	Laff	LP/cassette/8-track	1995 Loose Cannon/Island CD/cassette
1976	Rev. Du Rite	Laff	Cassette	1981 LP
1976	Holy Smoke!	Laff	Cassette	1980 LP
1976	Bicentennial Nigger	Warner Bros.	LP/cassette/8-track	1977/1978 LP, 1989 CD, 2000 and 2013 Warner Archive/Rhino album box sets, 2025 Rhino vinyl box set
1976	Insane	Laff	Cassette/8-track	1980 LP
1976	L.A. Jail	Tiger Lily	LP/8-track	
1976	Outrageous	Laff	Cassette/8-track	1979 LP
1977	Who Me? I'm Not Him	Laff	LP/cassette	1980 LP, 1994 Loose Cannon/Island CD/cassette
1977	Richard Pryor Live!	World Sound	LP	1982 Phoenix/Audiofidelity LP/Picture disc/cassette
1978	The Wizard of Comedy	Laff	LP/cassette/8-track	1995 Loose Cannon/Island CD
1978	Black Ben The Blacksmith	Laff	LP/cassette	1983 as Show Biz LP/cassette, 1994 Loose Cannon/Island CD/cassette
1978	Wanted: Live in Concert	Warner Bros.	2x-LP/cassette/8-track	1979 2xLP/cassette/8-track, 2000 and 2013 Warner Archive/Rhino album box sets, 2025 Rhino vinyl box set
1982	Live on the Sunset Strip	Warner Bros.	LP/cassette	2000 and 2013 Warner Archive/Rhino album box sets, 2025 Rhino vinyl box set
1982	Supernigger	Laff	LP/cassette/8-track	1995 Loose Cannon/Island CD/cassette
1983	Here and Now	Warner Bros.	LP/cassette	2000 and 2013 Warner Archive/Rhino album box sets, 2025 Rhino vinyl box set
2021	Live at the Comedy Store, 1973	Omnivore Recordings	CD/digital	Originally 2013 Shout! Factory CD box set No Pryor Restraint: Life in Concert promotional extra, 2023 Omnivore Recordings 2xLP, 2023 Stand Up! 2xLP color vinyl

=== Compilations ===
- 1973: Pryor Goes Foxx Hunting (Laff)
  - Split LP with Redd Foxx, containing previously released tracks from Craps (After Hours).
- 1975: Down And Dirty (Laff)
  - Split LP with Redd Foxx, containing previously released tracks from Craps (After Hours).
- 1976: Richard Pryor Meets ... Richard & Willie And ... The SLA!! (Laff)
  - Split LP with black ventriloquist act Richard And Willie, containing previously released tracks from Craps (After Hours).
- 1977: Richard Pryor's Greatest Hits (Warner Bros.)
  - Contains tracks from Craps (After Hours), That Nigger's Crazy, and ... Is It Something I Said?, plus a previously unreleased track from 1975, "Ali".
- 1982: The Very Best of Richard Pryor (Laff)
- 1983: Richard Pryor Live (Laff)
- 1983: Pissed Off! (Phoenix 10)
  - Split LP/cassette with Flip Wilson, containing previously released tracks from Laff Records.
- 2000: ... And It's Deep Too! The Complete Warner Bros. Recordings (1968–1992) (9-CD box set) (Warner Bros./Rhino)
  - Box set collection containing all Warner Bros. albums plus a bonus disc of previously unissued material from 1973 to 1992.
- 2002: The Anthology (1968–1992) (2-CD set) (Warner Bros./Rhino, 2002 in music)
  - Highlights culled from the albums collected in the ... And It's Deep Too! box set.
- 2005: Evolution/Revolution: The Early Years (1966–1974) (2-CD set) (Warner Bros./Rhino, 2005 in music)
  - Pryor-authorized compilation of material released on Laff, including the entire Craps (After Hours) album.
- 2013: No Pryor Restraint: Life In Concert (7-CD, 2-DVD box set) (Shout! Factory/Indigo)
  - Box set containing concert films, albums and unreleased material from 1966 to 1992.
  - A complimentary, limited-edition promo, entitled Live at The Comedy Store: Hollywood, CA — October, 1973 (Shout Factory PRO-00072 (6/13), was exclusively available to customers who pre-ordered from the company's web site.
- 2013: The Warner Bros. Albums (1974-1983) (7-CD box set) (Warner Bros./Rhino)
  - Official albums from That Nigger's Crazy to Here and Now.
- 2025: I Hope I'm Funny: The Warner Albums (1974-1983) (7-LP box set) (Rhino)
  - Same content as previous Warner box set, but on vinyl only.

=== Video albums ===
Year	Title	Label	Format	Reissues
1981	Live in Concert (1979)	RCA SelectaVision	CED Videodisc	1985 Vestron VHS, 1996 MPI VHS/LaserDisc, 1998/2004 MPI DVD, 2004 Revolver Entertainment UK DVD, 2006 HBO DVD, 2016 Netflix VOD, 2021 The Ultimate Richard Pryor Collection: Volume 1 DVD
1983	Live on the Sunset Strip (1982)	RCA/Columbia Pictures Home Video	CED Videodisc/LaserDisc	1985 RCA/Columbia VHS, 1996 Sony VHS, 1999 Columbia DVD, 2000 Sony DVD, 2005 Sony UMD, 2005/2009 Sony Double Feature DVD, 2012 streaming, 2016 Netflix VOD, 2019 Fabulous Films Blu-ray, 2021 The Ultimate Richard Pryor Collection: Volume 1 DVD, 2024 Ultra HD Blu-ray
1984	Here and Now (1983)	RCA/Columbia Pictures Home Video	CED Videodisc/LaserDisc/VHS	1998 Columbia VHS, 2002 Columbia DVD, 2005/2009 Sony Double Feature DVD, 2012 streaming, 2021 The Ultimate Richard Pryor Collection: Volume 1 DVD, 2026 Ultra HD Blu-ray
1985	Live & Smokin' (1971)	Vestron	CED Videodisc/LaserDisc/VHS	1997 MPI VHS, 2001 MPI DVD, 2005 Revolver Entertainment UK DVD, 2009 The Weinstein Company DVD, 2010 Beyond Home Entertainment Australia DVD, 2011 Alliance Double Feature DVD, Plex/Apple TV VOD, 2021 The Ultimate Richard Pryor Collection: Volume 1 DVD
2004	The Richard Pryor Show (1977)	Image Entertainment	3-DVD, 3-VHS box set	Vol. 1, Vol. 2 and TV Special individual videos, 2021 The Ultimate Richard Pryor Collection: Volume 1 DVD
2004	Richard Pryor: I Ain't Dead Yet, #*$#@!! (2003)	Comedy Central/Paramount	DVD	2013 Amazon streaming, Apple TV VOD, 2021 The Ultimate Richard Pryor Collection: Volume 2 DVD
2014	Richard Pryor: Icon (2014)	PBS	DVD/VOD	Streaming
2015	Richard Pryor: Omit the Logic (2013)	Magnolia Pictures	Blu-ray/DVD/VOD	Streaming, 2021 The Ultimate Richard Pryor Collection: Volume 2 DVD
2020	I Am Richard Pryor (2019)	Virgil Films	DVD/VOD/streaming	2021 Time Life DVD, 2021 The Ultimate Richard Pryor Collection DVD box set
2021	The Ultimate Richard Pryor Collection Uncensored	Time Life	13-DVD box set	Volume 1 (6-DVD box set), Volume 2 (6-DVD box set), 2022 reprint

== Preservation ==
The Richard Pryor Special? was preserved by the UCLA Film & Television Archive from an original 2 inch videotape. Preservation funding was provided by the John H. Mitchell Television Preservation Endowment. The preserved special screened at the 2024 UCLA Festival of Preservation.

== Bibliography ==
- Pryor, Richard; Gold, Todd (1995). Pryor Convictions and Other Life Sentences. New York: Pantheon Books. ISBN 9780679432500. OCLC 31660376.
