= Wanted: Live in Concert =

Live album by Richard Pryor
- Released: November 17, 1978
- Recorded: 1978
- Genre: Comedy
- Length: 86:31
- Label: Warner Bros.
- Producer: Richard Pryor, Biff Dawes

Richard Pryor chronology
| Bicentennial Nigger (1976) | Wanted: Live in Concert (1978) | Richard Pryor: Live on the Sunset Strip (1982) |

Professional ratings
Review scores
| Source | Rating |
|---|---|
| Allmusic | 4/5 stars |
| Christgau's Record Guide | A− |

Wanted: Live in Concert (also known as Wanted/Richard Pryor - Live in Concert) is the twelfth album by American comedian Richard Pryor. It was produced by Richard Pryor and Biff Dawes. Released as a double-LP in 1978, it includes performances from Pryor's concert tour in 1978. Two performances from that tour were filmed in Long Beach, California for theatrical release.

The album was nominated for the 1980 Grammy Award for Best Comedy Album. In 2017, Wanted: Live in Concert was selected for preservation in the National Recording Registry by the Library of Congress as being "culturally, historically, or aesthetically significant".

== Track listing ==
All tracks written by Richard Pryor.

Side A

1. "New Year's Eve" - 3:54
2. "White and Black People" - 7:59
3. "Black Funerals" - 2:55
4. "Discipline" - 8:00

Side B

1. "Heart Attacks" - 8:11
2. "Ali" - 4:11
3. "Keeping in Shape" - 6:48
4. "Leon Spinks" - 5:09

Side C

1. "Dogs and Horses" - 5:50
2. "Jim Brown" - 4:43
3. "Monkeys" - 4:05
4. "Kids" - 3:50

Side D

1. "Nature" - 3:31
2. "Things in the Woods" - 3:13
3. "Deer Hunter" - 3:02
4. "Chinese Food" - 3:23
5. "Being Sensitive" - 7:54

=== Recording locations ===
- Tracks A2, B3, C1, C3-C4, D1-D2 and D5 recorded at the John F. Kennedy Center for the Performing Arts in Washington, DC, September 3, 1978.
- Tracks A1-A3, B1-B2, B4, C2 and D4 recorded at the City Center of Music and Drama in New York, New York, September 19, 1978.
- Tracks A4 and D3 recorded at the Auditorium Theatre in Chicago, Illinois, September 28, 1978.
- Location recording by Wally Heider Recording, Biff Dawes, and Paul Sandweiss engineers.

== Certifications ==
| Region | Certification | Certified units/sales |
|---|---|---|
| United States (RIAA) | Gold | 500,000^{^} |
^{^} Shipments figures based on certification alone.
