= Bicentennial Nigger =

Live album by Richard Pryor
- Released: September 10, 1976
- Recorded: February 1976 and July 1976
- Venue: The Comedy Store and Roxy Theatre, West Hollywood, California
- Genre: Stand-up comedy
- Length: 40:23
- Label: Warner Bros.
- Producer: David Banks

Richard Pryor chronology
L.A. Jail (1976)	Bicentennial Nigger (1976)	Wanted: Live in Concert (1978)

Professional ratings
Review scores
Source	Rating
AllMusic	5/5 stars

Bicentennial Nigger is the sixth album by the American comedian Richard Pryor. David Banks produced the album, while Warner Bros. Records released the album in September 1976. It is often considered one of his most influential recordings. The CD version of the album was released on 20 June 1989. It won the 1977 Grammy Award for Best Comedy Album.

The album was recorded in July 1976 at the Roxy Theatre in West Hollywood, with the exception of the title track, recorded at The Comedy Store in Hollywood in February 1976, location recording by Wally Heider Recording, engineer Biff Dawes. Album cover design and art direction by John Kosh.

It ends with the words "I ain't never goin' to forget".

== Track listing ==
Side one

1. "Hillbilly" - 2:15
2. "Black and White Women" - 4:06
3. "Our Gang" - 2:48
4. "Bicentennial Prayer" - 6:42

Side two

1. "Black Hollywood" - 5:25
2. "Mudbone Goes to Hollywood" - 10:11
3. "Chinese Restaurant" - 1:18
4. "Acid" - 4:55
5. "Bicentennial Nigger" - 2:25
- On cassette releases, "Acid" was moved to side one, after "Bicentennial Prayer," to make the content more even on each side of the tape.

== Certifications ==
Region	Certification	Certified units/sales
United States (RIAA)	Gold	500,000^{^}
^{^} Shipments figures based on certification alone.
