= That Nigger's Crazy =

Live album by Richard Pryor
- Released: May 1974 (Partee/Stax); November 10, 1975 (Reprise)
- Recorded: Early 1974
- Venue: Soul Train nightclub (San Francisco)
- Genre: Stand-up comedy
- Length: 33:38
- Labels: Partee; Reprise
- Producers: Ron de Blasio & Richard Pryor

Richard Pryor chronology
Craps (After Hours) (1971)	That Nigger's Crazy (1974)	...Is It Something I Said? (1975)

Professional ratings
Review scores
Source	Rating
Allmusic	3/5 stars
Christgau's Record Guide	A

That Nigger's Crazy is the third album by American comedian Richard Pryor. It was recorded live at Don Cornelius' and Dick Griffey's Soul Train nightclub in early 1974. The album's title was derived from a remark made by Pryor himself in Wattstax.

Initially released on Stax Records under their "Partee" imprint, the album's success was temporarily derailed by the sudden closing of Stax later in 1974. Pryor regained control of the master rights to the album and signed with Warner Bros. Records almost immediately; the album was reissued on November 10, 1975, on their Reprise subsidiary, three months after Pryor's ...Is It Something I Said? was released.

The comedy album found its way to Billboard music charts where it went #1 on its R&B/Soul Albums chart for four weeks. It won the Grammy Award for Best Comedy Album for 1974.

The album received much praise and sold 500,000 copies, also winning a Grammy Award.

The album cover's rainbow border mimicked Barry White's 1973 album cover for Stone Gon'.

== Track listing ==
No.	Title	Length
1.	"I Hope I'm Funny"	3:28
2.	"Nigger with a Seizure"	5:24
3.	"Have Your Ass Home by 11:00"	2:30
4.	"Black & White Life Styles"	3:43
5.	"Exorcist"	1:53
6.	"Wino Dealing with Dracula"	2:11
7.	"Flying Saucers"	1:09
8.	"The Back Down"	3:37
9.	"Black Man/White Woman"	0:55
10.	"Niggers vs. Police"	1:42
11.	"Wino & Junkie"	7:06
Total length:		33:38

== Certifications ==
Region	Certification	Certified units/sales
United States (RIAA)	Gold	500,000^{^}
^{^} Shipments figures based on certification alone.

== See also ==
- List of number-one R&B albums of 1974 (U.S.)
