= List of Kathy Griffin stand-up specials =

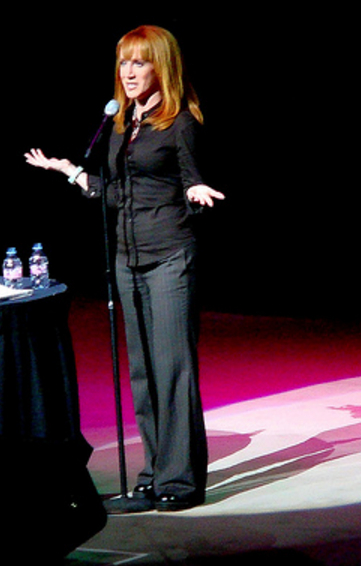
Griffin performing stand up in Las Vegas in 2008

Comedian Kathy Griffin has released 20 television specials, three original comedy albums, and two self-produced specials.

== Television specials ==
=== HBO ===
#	Title	Original airdate	Filming location	Segments	Notes
1	HBO Comedy Half-Hour: "Kathy Griffin" (season 3, episode 11)	October 18, 1996	The Fillmore; San Francisco, California	Griffin's first guest spot on the Seinfeld episode "The Doll"; Griffin's attempt to find a male prostitute; The Jerry Springer Show; Meeting Salt-n-Pepa	Griffin's only special as part of a television series
2	Kathy Griffin: Hot Cup of Talk	August 14, 1998	Variety Arts Theatre; Los Angeles, California	Griffin's acting stint in the play Awaiting the Renaissance; Madonna's British accent; VH1 Divas Live with Celine Dion and Mariah Carey; The new way to say "cunt"; Griffin's encounter with President Bill Clinton; Hanson	

=== Bravo ===
#	Title	Original airdate	Filming location	Segments	Notes
3	Kathy Griffin: The D-List	March 24, 2004	Laugh Factory; Los Angeles, California	Britney Spears's Las Vegas wedding; Meeting Whitney Houston at the Billboard Music Awards; Griffin's appearances on Hollywood Squares with Anna Nicole Smith and Little Richard; Hosting an AmfAR event with Sharon Stone	
4	Kathy Griffin: Allegedly	November 30, 2004 (DVD)	Variety Arts Theatre; Los Angeles, California	Pitching a sitcom to NBC; Working at VH1 Vogue Fashion Awards and meeting Macy Gray, Debbie Gibson, Destiny's Child, Salma Hayek, Renée Zellweger and Gwyneth Paltrow; The 9/11 celebrity telethon; Appearing in the music video for "The Real Slim Shady" with Eminem; Griffin's trip to Afghanistan; Brooke Shields' wedding; The View and Griffin's first time meeting Barbara Walters	Direct-to-DVD, later aired on Bravo. Griffin's only 90 minute special to date.
5	Kathy Griffin Is...Not Nicole Kidman	August 3, 2005	Orpheum Theatre; Los Angeles, California	Presenting with Ryan Seacrest at the American Music Awards; Griffin meeting Anna Nicole Smith backstage at the American Music Awards; Oprah Winfrey visiting the set of Colonial House; Barbra Streisand on Oprah; Backstage at American Idol; Meeting Clay Aiken at the Billboard Music Awards; Seeing Aiken and Kelly Clarkson perform in Las Vegas	Preceded the series premiere of Kathy Griffin: My Life on the D-list.
6	Kathy Griffin: Strong Black Woman	May 9, 2006	Orpheum Theatre; Los Angeles, California	Griffin working the red carpet premiere of War of the Worlds with Star Jones, and joking Dakota Fanning had entered a rehab facility; Watching Anderson Cooper's Hurricane Katrina coverage; Oprah Winfrey gaining weight; Tom Cruise on Oprah; Griffin's encounter with Celine Dion; Griffin's vacation in Palm Springs	
7	Kathy Griffin: Everybody Can Suck It	June 5, 2007	Wells Fargo Center for the Arts; Santa Rosa, California	Mel Gibson's arrest; Lindsay Lohan; Club Hyde in Los Angeles; Whitney Houston; Rosie O'Donnell's R family cruise; The Creative Arts Emmys; Ann Coulter	
8	Kathy Griffin: Straight to Hell	November 29, 2007	Chicago Theatre; Chicago, Illinois	Griffin's Emmy Award acceptance speech controversy; Senator Larry Craig's arrest; Paris Hilton; Paula Abdul and Hey Paula; Larry King's 50th Anniversary special; Co-hosting The View with Barbara Walters and Martha Stewart	
9	Kathy Griffin: She'll Cut a Bitch	April 15, 2009	Arlene Schnitzer Concert Hall; Portland, Oregon	Attending the Grammy nomination concert and seeing Taylor Swift and the Jonas Brothers; Attending the Grammy Awards; Spending her birthday with Cher; Maggie Griffin; Judge Judy; Attending the Creative Arts Emmys; Presenting at the Primetime Emmys	
10	Kathy Griffin: Balls of Steel	November 3, 2009	Civic Center; San Diego, California	Britney Spears; The Taylor Swift and Kanye West incident at the 2009 MTV Video Music Awards; Maggie Griffin's love of boxed wine and Hennessy; Jon and Kate Gosselin; Watching Oprah Winfrey interview Whitney Houston; Attending the Teen Choice Awards with Levi Johnston, and Miley Cyrus's performance; Presenting with Paula Abdul at VH1 Divas Live; Appearing on The View and confronting Barbara Walters; Michael Jackson and the Jackson family; Losing at the Primetime Emmys	
11	Kathy Griffin Does the Bible Belt	June 8, 2010	Tennessee Theatre; Knoxville, Tennessee	The Waffle House; Dancing With the Stars; Running into Renée Zellweger in Las Vegas; Griffin's appearance on Law and Order: SVU; Hoarders; Attending a dinner party with Suzanne Somers, Morgan Freeman, Sidney Poitier, Don Rickles, and Sharon Stone; Oprah Winfrey and Gayle King at the Texas State Fair	
12	Kathy Griffin: Whores on Crutches	November 2, 2010	Pechanga Resort and Casino; Temecula, California	The View; Playing on a slot machine; Paris Hilton's arrest; Tiger Woods and his affairs; Television shows she frequently watches; Maggie's new book Tip It; The Real Housewives of New Jersey	Originally titled "Diva in a Tipi".
13	Kathy Griffin: 50 and Not Pregnant	March 17, 2011	Riverside Theater; Milwaukee, Wisconsin	Attending parties at the 53rd Grammy Awards; The Oprah Winfrey Network and In the Bedroom with Dr. Laura Berman; Sitting next to Uma Thurman at a roast of Quentin Tarantino; Justin Bieber and Miley Cyrus in Justin Bieber: Never Say Never; Steven Seagal: Lawman; Maggie Griffin's last wishes; Being avoided by Sarah Palin in Reno; Performing in Knoxville for her previous special Kathy Griffin Does the Bible Belt	
14	Kathy Griffin: Gurrl Down	June 22, 2011	Wilbur Theatre; Boston, Massachusetts	Sarah Palin and her family; Trying to pick up guys at MIT; Griffin's run-in with Michele Bachmann; Hosting CNN's New Year's Eve Bash with Anderson Cooper; My Strange Addiction; Kirstie Alley; Phaedra from The Real Housewives of Atlanta; Meeting Bill O'Reilly backstage at Glee; Lady Gaga's parents	
15	Kathy Griffin: Pants Off	September 20, 2011	Segerstrom Center for the Arts; Costa Mesa, California	Introduction by Maggie Griffin; The wedding of Kim Kardashian and Kris Humphries; Bruce Jenner; Casey Anthony; Nancy Grace; Marcus Bachmann's gay conversion clinic; The Real Housewives of New Jersey and Orange County; Performing at a maximum security prison; Being pants-less during the 2011 Virginia earthquake in New York City; Dinner with Gloria Steinem; Eating a pot brownie; Housesitting for Anderson Cooper	Originally titled "Kathy Griffin: Pray The Gay Back".
16	Kathy Griffin: Tired Hooker	December 20, 2011	Borgata Hotel; Atlantic City, New Jersey	Kim Kardashian and Kris Humphries' divorce; Demi Moore and Ashton Kutcher's divorce; Receiving a bikini wax; Hugh Jackman's one-man Broadway show; Nancy Grace on Dancing with the Stars; Starting a fake account on Grindr; Griffin's dogs Larry and Pom-Pom; Lindsay Lohan's community service; Pajama jeans and Forever Lazy; The Real Housewives of Beverly Hills; Ordering pizza with Cher	
17	Kathy Griffin: Seaman 1st Class	July 26, 2012	Terrace Theater; Long Beach, California	Miley Cyrus's engagement to Liam Hemsworth; Anderson Cooper guest starring on Kathy; Bristol Palin: Life's a Tripp; The Real Housewives of Orange County; The Westboro Baptist Church protesting Griffin; Oprah's Next Chapter; The whippets and sizzurp crazes; Cher's Twitter feed; Stealing a seat at the Grammy Awards from Eric Church; Griffin's prison pen pal	
18	Kathy Griffin: Kennedie Center On-Hers	January 3, 2013	State Theatre; Minneapolis, Minnesota	Meeting Celine Dion backstage in Las Vegas; Lindsay Lohan's legal problems; Liz and Dick and Lifetime original movies; Filming video spots for Barack Obama with Cher; Miley Cyrus; Sexting Anderson Cooper; Beyond Scared Straight; The reunion special of The Real Housewives of New Jersey; Josh Groban	
19	Kathy Griffin: Calm Down Gurrl	June 4, 2013	Wells Fargo Center for the Arts; Santa Rosa, California	Convicted murderer Jodi Arias following Griffin on Twitter; Meeting Barbra Streisand at Jane Fonda's birthday; Justin Bieber; The sizzurp craze and Lil Wayne's overdose; Griffin's new boyfriend; Griffin's new dog Pom-pom; Amanda Bynes' erratic behavior; Reading articles about oral sex in Redbook	
20	Kathy Griffin: Record Breaker	December 18, 2013	Majestic Theatre; San Antonio, Texas	Rick Perry; Presenting at the Daytime Emmy Awards; Maggie Griffin's opinion of Miley Cyrus's performance at the 2013 MTV Video Music Awards; Griffin going on a gay cruise; Appearing on Kirstie Alley's sitcom Kirstie; Fanmail from Griffin's prison pen pal	Griffin's 20th special and a representative from Guinness World Records attended to certify her record of "Most Televised Stand-Up Specials by a Comedian."

== Self-produced specials ==
Title	Release date	Filming location	Segments	Notes
Kathy Griffin: A Hell of a Story	March 11, 2019 (South by Southwest); July 31, 2019 (theatrical)	Santa Monica College Performing Arts Center; Santa Monica, California	Prologue: Recap of the Donald Trump photo controversy and Griffin's Laugh Your Head Off World Tour; Sarah Huckabee Sanders; Griffin's friendship with Stormy Daniels; Samantha Bee calling Ivanka Trump a "feckless cunt"; Donald Trump and his children; Maggie Griffin thinking Kathy joined Al-Qaeda; Living next door to Kim Kardashian; attending a dinner party with Melanie Griffith and Kris Jenner; Craigslist personals missed connections; Harvey Levin and TMZ; Fallout from the Donald Trump photo controversy; Hate and support mail; Being on the No Fly List; Meeting Stevie Nicks; Attending the 2018 White House Correspondents' Dinner; Being interrogated by the Department of Justice with Alan Isaacman	Shown in theaters for one night through Fathom Events
Kathy Griffin: My Life on the PTSD List	October 8, 2025 (YouTube)	Moore Theatre, Seattle, Washington	Living next door to Kim Kardashian and Kanye West; Being banned from Twitter for impersonating Elon Musk; Griffin's PTSD after the Donald Trump photo controversy; Griffin's lung cancer surgery and recovery; Griffin's second divorce and spending time with Sharon Stone and Jane Fonda; Trying psychedelic mushrooms; Griffin's friendship with Sia; Griffin's suicide attempt and being placed under psychiatric evaluation; Performing on a gay cruise; Britney Spears and Justin Timberlake; Confronting Les Moonves; Attending Paris Hilton's Christmas party	Griffin released the special on her YouTube channel after being unable to find a distributor

== Albums ==
=== Original albums ===
Title	Release date	Recording location	Tracklist	Notes
For Your Consideration	July 17, 2008	Grand Theatre Center for the Arts; Tracy, California	"The Hot Ticket"; "The Survey: Gay? Straight?"; "The Clicker (For the Maggie Fans)"; "My First Rebanning (Hi Barbara Walters!)"; "Happy Sunday (More Maggie!)"; "Cover Me"; "Oprah Is a Deity (And I Think She Is Full of Shit)"; "Oprah's Favorite Things"; "The Osmonds Were Never Cool"; "Freaky Doll People (Demi? Oh Yeah!)"; "Straight Guys Wake Up!"; "Our New Daddy's Coming"; "Wizard of Woz"; "My Run-in With Spielberg"	
Suckin' It for the Holidays	November 3, 2009	Borgata Hotel; Atlantic City, New Jersey	"Happy Kwaanza"; "Maggie the Gay Activist"; "Sturdy Germans & Polacks"; "Nervous Pills & Boxes of Wine"; "Katie Couric (Again!!!)"; "President Suze Orman"; "I Met Gayle"; "Maya Angelou Is Insufferable"; "Justin Out-Blacks T.I."; "Somebody Has to Blow Trump"; "Kelly vs. Bethany"; "A Dude Named Danielle"; "Congratulations (Speidi)"	Is not a holiday album, although Kwanzaa is mentioned briefly.
Look at My Butt Crack	August 14, 2014	The Mirage; Las Vegas, Nevada	"Introduction"; "Maggie Griffin updates"; "Kardashian Khaos store in the Mirage Hotel, Keeping Up with the Kardashians, and Kanye West"; "Going around Las Vegas, people watching"; "The Grammies"; "Britney Spears"; "Homeschooling"; "Visiting Katt Williams"; "Maggie Griffin's history with gay rights"; "Demi Lovato"; "Celebrities at the Grammies. Pink, Katy Perry, Madonna"; "Anderson Cooper"; "Eagles tour and celebrities encountered"	

=== Television specials released as albums ===
- Kathy Griffin Does the Bible Belt - August 9, 2010
- Kathy Griffin: 50 and Not Pregnant - July 18, 2011
- Kathy Griffin: Seaman 1st Class - August 20, 2012
- Kathy Griffin: Calm Down Gurrl - August 6, 2013

== Awards and nominations ==
Year	Award	Category	Work	Result
2008	Primetime Emmy Award	Outstanding Variety, Music or Comedy Special	Kathy Griffin: Straight to Hell	Nominated
2009	Primetime Emmy Award	Outstanding Variety, Music or Comedy Special	Kathy Griffin: She'll Cut a Bitch	Nominated
2011	Grammy Award	Best Comedy Album	Kathy Griffin Does the Bible Belt	Nominated
2012	Primetime Emmy Award	Outstanding Variety Special	Kathy Griffin: Tired Hooker	Nominated
2012	Grammy Award	Best Comedy Album	Kathy Griffin: 50 & Not Pregnant	Nominated
2013	Grammy Award	Best Comedy Album	Kathy Griffin: Seaman 1st Class	Nominated
2014	Grammy Award	Best Comedy Album	Kathy Griffin: Calm Down Gurrl	Won

== Home video ==
- Kathy Griffin: Allegedly - November 30, 2004
- Kathy Griffin Is... Not Nicole Kidman - June 12, 2007. Included on the season 1 set of Kathy Griffin: My Life on the D-List.
- Kathy Griffin: She'll Cut a Bitch - January 12, 2010
- Kathy Griffin: Pants Off/Tired Hooker - August 7, 2012 (Region 1)
- The Kathy Griffin Collection: Red, White & Raw - October 30, 2012. Contains seven of Kathy's Bravo specials including Balls of Steel, Does the Bible Belt, Whores on Crutches, 50 and Not Pregnant, Gurrl Down, Pants Off and Tired Hooker. (Region 1)
- Kathy Griffin: A Hell of a Story - August 13, 2019
