= List of Kathy Griffin: My Life on the D-List episodes =

Kathy Griffin: My Life on the D-List is an American Reality television series on Bravo. The pilot episode of the show was broadcast on August 3, 2005.The series focuses on Griffin's scheming for publicity with staffers Jessica, Tiffany, and Tom. Her relationships with her parents and her now ex-husband have also been heavily featured. In addition, her relationships and dating life are also featured.

Griffin had titled her first Bravo comedy special The D-List (2004), to imply that her pull as a bottom-feeder celebrity was so low, she didn't even make the "C-list." The special was so popular that the network later approached Griffin to film a reality series based on her celebrity-bashing comedy.

== Series overview ==
Season	Episodes	Originally released	
Season	Episodes	First released	Last released
1	6	August 3, 2005	September 7, 2005
2	6	June 6, 2006	July 18, 2006
3	7	June 5, 2007	July 24, 2007
4	10	June 12, 2008	August 14, 2008
5	10	June 8, 2009	August 10, 2009
6	8	June 15, 2010	August 3, 2010

== Episodes ==
=== Season 1 (2005) ===
No.	Title	Original release date
1	"Out & About"	August 3, 2005
Despite living a life of low-celeb status, where she assists in judging a drag queen beauty pageant, attempts to recruit celebrities to come to her annual Toys for Tots fundraiser, tries to get a free sofa for her in-the-works A-List house, and "bombs" with her raunchy comedy at a stuffy charity dinner, Kathy gets all of the support she needs from her parents, her husband, her wonderful assistant, her two "best gays," and her live-in gay visionary, Mike, who is designing Kathy's house for next-to-free in exchange for the publicity that will come with the house. Guest stars: Caroline Rhea, Marcia Cross, John C. Reilly and Warren Beatty
2	"Hot to Tot"	August 10, 2005
The always-busy Kathy takes on as much as she can handle before her big Toys for Tots fundraiser, including shopping for more furniture, getting a next-to-free custom-made sofa, flying to Oregon for a celebrity poker tournament, going to Las Vegas to film a commercial for the Billboard Awards, and still finding time to plug her upcoming DVD, Allegedly, on Extra. Guest stars: Ricki Lake, Scottie Pippen, Lance Bass and Ray Romano
3	"Adjusted Growth"	August 17, 2005
Kathy and Matt go on the publicity train by doing a nationwide tour for Kathy's new comedy DVD, titled Allegedly. On the tour, Star Jones inadvertently disses her on The View, John McEnroe butchers her name on his talk show, no one shows up to her hyped DVD signings, and Jay Leno calls her ugly on air. Guest stars: John McEnroe and Joan Rivers
4	"High Brow"	August 24, 2005
Kathy gets the opportunity she's been waiting for – to work the red carpet at the Grammy Award ceremony for the E! network. Guest stars: Quentin Tarantino, Kanye West and Star Jones
5	"From A to D"	August 31, 2005
Kathy receives a surprise from one of Hollywood's top A-Listers: Renée Zellweger. Guest star: Jonathan Bennett
6	"Magic Carpet Ride"	September 7, 2005
Because of her success at the Grammys, Kathy gets the job patrolling the red carpet at the Oscars from the "media bridge" as part of E!'s Live from the Red Carpet special. Guest stars: Jonathan Bennett and Lance Bass

=== Season 2 (2006) ===
No.	Title	Original release date
1	"Going, Going, Gone"	June 6, 2006
Kathy addresses her breakup with husband Matt, goes on a 'Red State' stand-up tour and auctions off a weekend stay for one at her house for charity. She also finds time to appear on Jimmy Kimmel Live! and The Tyra Banks Show.
2	"Red State, Blue State"	June 13, 2006
The winner of Kathy's auction finally arrives for a weekend stay at her home, but he's not quite as flamboyant as she had hoped. Regardless, Kathy shows him a grand old time – Hollywood style. Meanwhile, she attempts to lose 10 pounds and later prepares for a trip to Iraq to entertain the troops. Guest stars: Jane Seymour, Alfre Woodard, and Brenda Strong
3	"Iraq"	June 20, 2006
Kathy, Matt, MADtv's Michael McDonald, and JAG's Karri Turner travel to Kuwait, Tikrit, and Baghdad to entertain troops in the war zone.
4	"Rocket Attack"	June 27, 2006
Kathy's last days performing for the troops in Iraq turn perilously dramatic when two rockets are fired at the base. Back at home, Kathy cares for her niece and nephew, who get to meet Laguna Beach star Talan Torriero. Meanwhile, a cranky Kathy copes with her diet.
5	"Puppy Chaos"	July 11, 2006
Kathy tries to tame her badly-behaved puppy Pom-Pom before they both take to the catwalk in a dog-and-owner fashion show for charity called Paws for Style. Meanwhile, she also redesigns a suite in a sleek San Francisco hotel, teaches a class for aspiring comedians and works a private corporate event. Guest stars: Caroline Rhea and Rachel True
6	"Vegas, Baby!"	July 18, 2006
In the second season finale, Kathy and her assistant, Jessica, journey to Las Vegas, where Kathy gets up bright and early to host a buffet event. Later, she chills out by getting ice-skating tips from Olympian Johnny Weir. Also, Kathy appears on the TV show Queer Eye for the Straight Guy. Matt Moline's last episode. Guest stars: Johnny Weir and Fab Five from Queer Eye

=== Season 3 (2007) ===
No.	Title	Original release date
1	"Suddenly Single"	June 5, 2007
Kathy's hired two more assistants, Tom and Tiffany, to help her keep up with the pace. Some of her upcoming events include a visit to the ladies of The View (which goes much better than last time thanks to Star's departure), a gig hosting a corporate film for Redken sales reps, and most importantly--a sold out show at Carnegie Hall Note: Tom Vize and Tiffany Rinehart's first episode. Guest stars: Whoopi Goldberg and Joan Rivers
2	"Dating for Publicity"	June 12, 2007
Now that she is single again, Kathy plans on jumping back into the dating pool and making a big splash by dating someone who will get her all the publicity that she needs. First in the mix is Nick Carter, whom she ends up going out with, but whose publicist tries to maintain the encounter out of the press. Guest star: Nick Carter
3	"The Show Must Go On"	June 19, 2007
Kathy is ready to set out on Rosie O'Donnell's lesbian cruise, but soon realizes that she must adjust her comedic material to captivate the lesbian audience. To do so, she enlists assistance from Work Out star Jackie Warner. However, and to her dismay, Kathy's comedy is not her only impediment, as she receives horrible news that may shake the entire course of her life from this point forward. Note: John Griffin's last episode
4	"What I Won't Do for a Buck"	June 26, 2007
Following her tragic family loss, Kathy begins to ponder her legacy and wishes to resolve all her relationship issues. In the meantime, she is also offered a gig on a home-shopping network, hosts a performance in her hometown Chicago, and reconnects with an old high-school love. Guest star: Ron Jeremy
5	"Prison + Porn = Fun for Everyone"	July 10, 2007
Kathy hosts the Gay Porn Awards and performs at a prison. Guest star: Paul Rodriguez
6	"Kathy Goes to London"	July 17, 2007
Kathy goes to London to celebrate her show starting over the pond. Guest star: Chucky Venn, Julia Morris, Perez Hilton, Ricky Gervais, and Graham Norton
7	"Back to My Irish Roots, Literally"	July 24, 2007
Kathy gets an award from the Irish America magazine. Kathy wants to reconnect with her roots and travels to Ireland. She leaves some of her father's ashes there as a way to say goodbye. Guest star: Andrew W.K

=== Season 4 (2008) ===
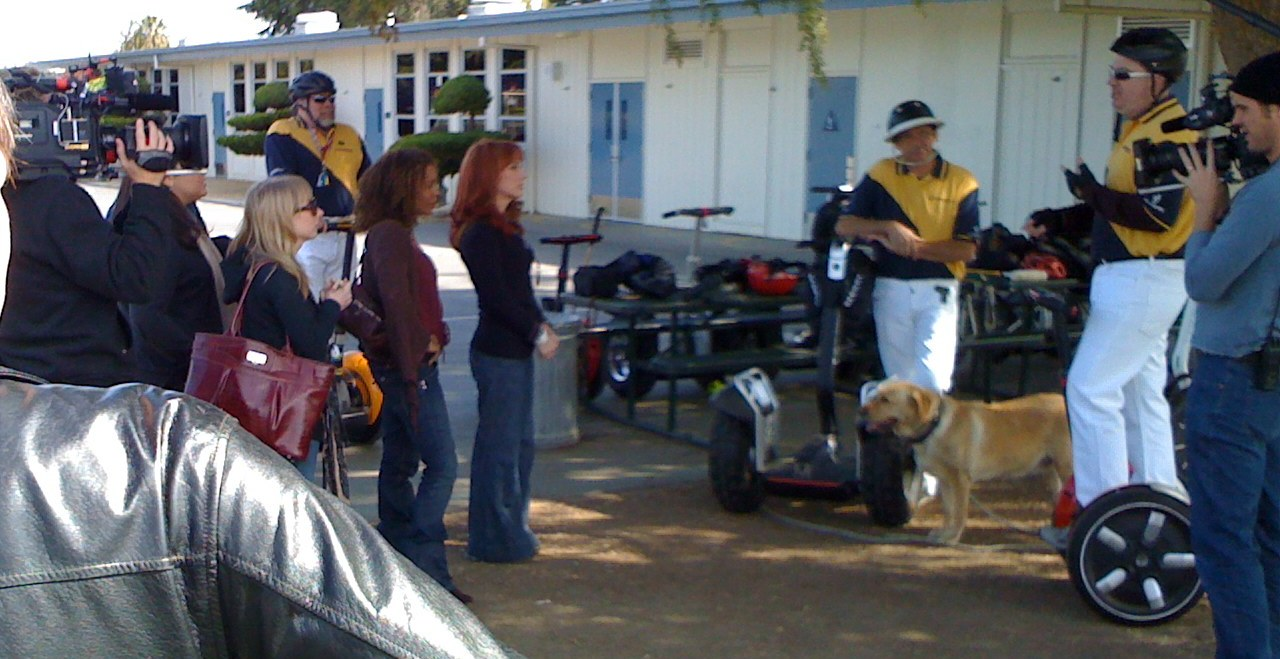
Filming of the ninth episode of the season

No.	Title	Original release date
1	"And the Award Goes to..."	June 12, 2008
Kathy's back with another packed season which sees her kick things off at CNN's New Year's Eve Countdown show which she is co-hosting live to over 200 nations. Also, Kathy has been invited to the PGA awards as the show has been nominated. So, alongside Steve Wozniak she gets the chance to rub shoulders with some proper 'A' listers. Note: Steve Wozniak's first episode. Guest stars: Anderson Cooper, Christina Applegate, Ricky Gervais, and Graham Norton
2	"Home Is Where the Profit Is"	June 19, 2008
Kathy takes a trip to meet the families of two of her followers, and also has a look round their hometowns. She also sets her sights on winning another award, this time a Grammy. Guest stars: Tom Green and Coolio
3	"Fly the Super Gay Skies"	June 26, 2008
Kathy sets off to the land Down Under where she takes part in Mardi Gras, on a float. Before she even gets there though her trip is eventful as she does a stand-up act on the aeroplane, and the plane's crew are a little more unusual than normal. Guest stars: Margaret Cho, Cyndi Lauper, Lance Bass, Olivia Newton-John, Carson Kressley, and Anthony Callea
4	"Otters, Cubs and Bears... Oh My!"	July 3, 2008
Kathy sets off to the land Down Under where she takes part in Mardi Gras, on a float. Before she even gets there though her trip is eventful as she does a stand-up act on the aeroplane, and the plane's crew are a little more unusual than normal. Guest star: Rosie O'Donnell
5	"Speak Now or Forever Hold Your Peace"	July 10, 2008
Kathy visits the Bad Girls Club in Brooklyn and tries to learn how to "pop off." Rosie has done unspeakable things to her Emmy's that mortifies Kathy. And Kathy marries a couple...it's true and it's on a farm!
6	"No Time for Siestas"	July 17, 2008
Kathy opens up the 'Kathy Griffin Leadership Academy' down in Mexico which should help provide more 'D' listers, and she also attempts to get some rather large donations from large businesses.
7	"Busted in Bora Bora"	July 24, 2008
Kathy Griffin heads to Bora Bora to perform stand up and to greet fans. Also she attempts to get her mother to leave her house and move to a retirement home.
8	"For Your (Grammy) Consideration"	July 31, 2008
Kathy has an idea how she can promote her new CD, one which involves going on an unusual date. The problem is, her mum is the one getting all the attention from the media.
9	"Woz Love Got to Do With It?"	August 7, 2008
Kathy joins up with Steve Wozniak to host a charity affair, although it proves tough on their friendship. Also, Kathy tries to be a matchmaker for one of her friends. Note: Steve Wozniak's last episode. Guest stars: Rachel True and Peggy Fleming
10	"Red, White and Don't Be Blue"	August 14, 2008
Kathy jets off to New York where she performs for some members of the armed forces who have been injured in combat. Note: Jessica Zajicek's last episode

=== Season 5 (2009) ===
No.	Title	Original release date
0	"The Footage You Weren't Meant To See"	June 1, 2009
1	"Place Your Bette"	June 8, 2009
Kathy starts to think she has a chance of moving off of the D List after a string of awards and nominations. She heads down to Grammy HQ in order to beg/bribe/plead them into giving her an award! Kathy meets up with Bette Midler who offers her a part she cannot refuse. Guest star: Bette Midler, Toni Basil, and Stevie Nicks
2	"I Heart Lily Tomlin"	June 15, 2009
Kathy's determination to get a Grammy nomination has paid off, but she won't rest until she has won the award. Kathy starts calling round previous winners in an effort to secure their votes. She ends up heading to Canada where she speaks to Lily Tomlin. Guest star: Lily Tomlin, Christina Aguilera, Charo, Jermaine Dupri, Jane Fonda, Wynonna Judd, Chaka Khan, Little Richard, LL Cool J, Liza Minnelli, Ne-Yo, and Taylor Swift
3	"Grammy Shmammy"	June 22, 2009
The Grammy's are finally here and it's time to see if all Kathy's hard work has paid off. When things don't go as planned, Kathy heads to Georgia in order to put her disappointment behind her. Guest stars: Paula Deen, Bobby Deen, Jamie Deen, and Michael McDonald
4	"Paris Is My New BFF"	June 29, 2009
Kathy realises that to appeal to the younger generation, she needs to brush shoulders with young Hollywood stars. She lands a spot on a teen drama and spends the day with Paris Hilton, whilst she allows her mum to set up her Facebook page for her. Guest star: Paris Hilton, Tyler Bachtel, Snoop Dogg, Adam Bertrand, Joanna Garcia, Allan Louis, Michael McDonald, David Monahan, Ignacio Serricchio, Jill Zarin, Patrick Rush, and Rachel True
5	"Maggie's Bucket List"	July 6, 2009
Kathy is looking for work ideas and helps her mom write and complete a bucket list. Guest stars: Stefanie Powers, Betty White, Nicole Sullivan, Michael McDonald, and Don Rickles
6	"Rosie and Gloria and Griffin... Oh My!"	July 13, 2009
Kathy is looking for a second home and Star Island seems to be the perfect location. Kathy meets up with some fellow celebrities and also works in a hotel. Guest stars: Rosie O'Donnell, Billy Bean, and Gloria Estefan
7	"Kathy at the Apollo"	July 20, 2009
Kathy tries to bring in a new audience by appearing at the Apollo Theatre, and she meets Katt Williams. Guest stars: Katt Williams, Al Sharpton, Francia Raisa, Shane Sparks, Wayne Federman, and T.I.
8	"Norma Gay"	July 27, 2009
Kathy joins in the protest for gay rights as she travels to Sacramento. She meets up with Melissa Etheridge who has a new nickname for her. Guest star: Melissa Etheridge, Tammy Lynn Michaels, Jane Lynch, George Takei, Antonio Villaraigosa, and Drew Barrymore
9	"Official Book Club Selection"	August 3, 2009
Kathy's gets her hopes up about getting out of her D list status once she hears a lifelike model of her is in the works. She also works on her book by meeting famous authors and going to a photo shoot for the cover. Guest stars: Jackie Collins, Mike Ruiz, and Salman Rushdie
10	"Kathy Is a Star...Kind Of"	August 10, 2009
Kathy visits Suzanne Somers' home and gets a star on the Palm Springs Walk of Stars. Guest stars: Suzanne Somers, Barry Manilow, Alan Hamel, and Carol Channing

=== Season 6 (2010) ===
No.	Title	Original release date
1	"Kathy With a Z"	June 15, 2010
Kathy prepares for her guest spot on Law and Order: Special Victims Unit and gets advice from Liza Minnelli. Guest stars: Liza Minnelli, Mariska Hargitay, Christopher Meloni, Ice-T, and Juan José Campanella
2	"Toddlers & Remodelers"	June 22, 2010
Kathy hires A-List designer Kenny Davis to remodel her Hollywood Hills home. Kathy's mom, Maggie, gets a book deal. Kathy and Maggie are guest judges at the California Miss Kiddie Pageant. Guest stars: Lara Spencer and Kenny Davis
3	"Freezing My A-List Off"	June 29, 2010
Kathy and Team Griffin travel to Alaska for a show. Along the way they stop in Wasilla to hang with Levi Johnston and search for Sarah Palin. Guest stars: Levi Johnston
4	"Moving the Merch"	July 6, 2010
Kathy explores merchandising options for Maggie. Guest stars: Lauren Conrad and Suze Orman
5	"Kathy Goes to Washington"	July 13, 2010
Kathy travels to Washington, D.C. to support the repeal of "Don't Ask, Don't Tell" in the military. Guest stars: Barney Frank, Jared Polis, Daniel Choi, and Jim Clyburn
6	"Kathy's Smear Campaign"	July 20, 2010
Kathy undergoes a public Pap smear to bring awareness to women's health issues. She poses as Bettie Page for photographer Mike Ruiz and performs at Madison Square Garden. Guest stars: Mike Ruiz and Joy Behar
7	"Getting My House in Order"	July 27, 2010
Kathy discovers that Tom is sleep-eating and tries to help him reduce his stress by throwing him a T.G.I. Friday's "flare-a-thon" with Brad Garrett. Lara Spencer finishes the remodel on Kathy's house. Kathy's beloved dog Chance dies and after several weeks she welcomes a new dog, Larry, into her home. Guest stars: Lara Spencer and Brad Garrett
8	"Maggie, the Musical"	August 3, 2010
To make it up to Maggie after swearing on CNN, Kathy organizes a talent show for the residents of Maggie's retirement community. The show goes well despite the late arrival by Cloris Leachman and Kathy performs "You Made Me Love You" with re-written lyrics in Maggie's honor. Guest stars: Laura Bell Bundy, Kristin Chenoweth, Cloris Leachman, Seth Rudetsky, and Rip Taylor
