= Calm Down Gurrl =

Live album by Kathy Griffin
- Released: August 6, 2013
- Recorded: June 4, 2013
- Genre: Comedy
- Length: 43:01
- Label: Back Lot Music
- Producer: Kathy Griffin

Kathy Griffin chronology
Kennedie Center On-Hers (2013)	Calm Down Gurrl (2013)	Record Breaker (2013)

Calm Down Gurrl is the sixth album and seventeenth Bravo stand-up comedy special by stand-up comedian Kathy Griffin and nineteenth overall. It was televised live from the Wells Fargo Center for the Arts in Santa Rosa, California, on June 4, 2013, on Bravo.

== Track listing ==
No.	Title	Length
1.	"Introduction"	1:20
2.	"The Jodi Arias trial"	8:10
3.	"Jane Fonda's birthday party with Barbra Streisand"	10:00
4.	"Justin Bieber and paparazzi"	3:30
5.	"Sizzurp"	2:00
6.	"Lil Wayne's coma"	4:00
7.	"Boyfriend meeting the family"	5:30
8.	"New dog"	1:30
9.	"Amanda Bynes"	3:00
10.	"Redbook"	4:01
Total length:		43:01

== Personnel ==
Technical and production

- Kathy Griffin – executive producer
- Jenn Levy – executive producer
- Paul Miller – executive producer
- Kimber Rickabaugh – executive producer
- Jeff U'ren – film editor
- Bruce Ryan – production design
- Cisco Henson – executive in charge of production
- Lesley Maynard – associate director / stage manager
- Davi Crivelli – technical supervisor

Visuals and imagery

- Ashlee Mullen – hair stylist / make-up artist
- Simon Miles – lighting designer

== Award and nominations ==
The live Bravo performance special won the Grammy for Best Comedy Album in the 56th Grammy Awards.
