= Kathy Griffin Is... Not Nicole Kidman =

Is...Not Nicole Kidman

Live album and video by Kathy Griffin
- Released: 2005
- Recorded: August 3, 2005
- Genre: Comedy
- Length: 44:57
- Producer: Kathy Griffin

Kathy Griffin chronology
Allegedly (2004)	Is...Not Nicole Kidman (2005)	Strong Black Woman (2006)

Is...Not Nicole Kidman is the fifth stand-up comedy special by stand-up comedian Kathy Griffin on Bravo and her fifth overall. It was televised live from the Orpheum Theatre in Los Angeles, California on August 3, 2005, on Bravo. This special precedes the series premiere of Kathy Griffin: My Life on the D-list.

== Track listing ==
No.	Title	Length
1.	"Introduction"	2:00
2.	"American Music Awards with Ryan Seacrest"	10:00
3.	"Anna Nicole Smith"	5:00
4.	"Oprah Goes Back in Time"	3:00
5.	"Barbra Streisand on Oprah"	8:00
6.	"Clay Aiken and Kelly Clarkson"	16:57
Total length:		44:57

== Personnel ==
Technical and production

- Stacy Brewster - associate producer
- Tom Bull - supervising producer
- Scott Butler - producer
- Sandy Chanley - executive producer
- Keith Truesdell - producer
- Eban Scheltetter - music producer
- Brent Carpenter - film editor
- Mark Hoffman - production design
- Bill Kappelman - sound: A2
- Larry Reed - sound mixer
- Blaine Stewart - post-production audio: Post Plus
- Jeff Pierce - on-line editor
- Michelle Walsh - assistant editor
- Jahmir Blanchard - production associate
- Jesse Bryner - production associate
- Mark Hansson - associate director / stage manager
- Renee Olsen - production associate
- John Pritchett - technical director
- Mark Reilly - assistant: Sandy Chanley
- Doug Shaffer - production enthusiast
- Frederique Barrera - production coordinator (uncredited)

Visuals and imagery

- Cynthia Bachman Brown - makeup stylist (as Cynthia Bachman)
- Caroline Wiseman - hair stylist
- Marvin Bluth - tape operator
- Randy Gomez - camera operator
- Greg Grouwinkel - camera operator
- Marc Hunter - camera operator
- Guy Jones - video operator
- Ritch Kenney - camera operator
- Simon Miles - lighting designer
- Danny Webb - camera operator (as Dan Webb)
- Easter Xua - camera operator
- Judith Brewer Curtis - wardrobe stylist (as Judith Curtis)
