= She'll Cut a Bitch =

Live album by Kathy Griffin
- Released: January 12, 2010
- Recorded: April 15, 2009
- Genre: Comedy
- Length: 44:18
- Label: Shout! Factory
- Producer: Kathy Griffin

Kathy Griffin chronology
For Your Consideration (2009)	She'll Cut a Bitch (2010)	Suckin' It for the Holidays (2009)

She'll Cut a Bitch is the second home video release and seventh Bravo stand-up comedy special by stand-up comedian Kathy Griffin, and her ninth overall. It was televised live from the Arlene Schnitzer Concert Hall in Portland, Oregon on April 15, 2009, on Bravo.

== Track listing ==
No.	Title	Length
1.	"Introduction"	1:00
2.	"The Grammies, Taylor Swift and the Jonas Brothers"	6:20
3.	"Meeting Cher"	10:40
4.	"Maggie Griffin moving out"	7:00
5.	"The Creative Arts Emmys"	19:42
Total length:		44:18

== Personnel ==
Technical and production

- Kathy Griffin - executive producer
- Jenn Levy - executive producer
- Paul Miller - executive producer
- Kimber Rickabaugh - executive producer
- David W. Foster - film editor
- Bruce Ryan - production design
- Gene Crowe - associate director

Visuals and imagery

- Jennifer Montoya - hair & make-up
- Josh Morton - sound re-recording mixer
- Simon Miles - lighting designer

== Award and nominations ==
The live Bravo performance special was nominated for the Emmy for Outstanding Variety, Music or Comedy Special at the 61st Primetime Emmy Awards.
