= Look at My Butt Crack =

Live album by Kathy Griffin
- Released: August 14, 2014
- Recorded: Paradise, Nevada
- Genre: Comedy
- Length: 1:58:58
- Label: Music with a Twist
- Producer: Donut Run Productions, Inc.

Kathy Griffin chronology
Record Breaker (2013)	Look at My Butt Crack (2014)	A Hell of a Story (2019)

Look at My Butt Crack is the seventh comedy album by American stand-up comedian Kathy Griffin, recorded live on August 14, 2014, in Las Vegas, Nevada at the Mirage.

== Track listing ==
No.	Title	Length
1.	"Introduction"	02:45
2.	"Maggie Griffin updates"	0:40
3.	"Kardashian Khaos store in the Mirage Hotel, Keeping Up with the Kardashians, and Kanye West"	15:50
4.	"Going around Las Vegas, people watching"	7:15
5.	"The Grammies"	2:30
6.	"Britney Spears"	7:10
7.	"Homeschooling"	1:10
8.	"Visiting Katt Williams"	17:00
9.	"Maggie Griffin's history with gay rights"	13:00
10.	"Demi Lovato"	13:00
11.	"Celebrities at the Grammies. Pink, Katy Perry, Madonna"	10:00
12.	"Anderson Cooper"	12:00
13.	"Eagles tour and celebrities encountered"	16:58
Total length:		1:58:58

== Personnel ==
Technical and production

- Kathy Griffin – Executive producer; performer

Visuals and imagery
