= Strong Black Woman =

Live album by Kathy Griffin
- Released: 2006
- Recorded: May 9, 2006
- Genre: Comedy
- Length: 44:38
- Producer: Kathy Griffin

Kathy Griffin chronology
Is...Not Nicole Kidman (2005)	Strong Black Woman (2006)	Everybody Can Suck It (2007)

Strong Black Woman is the fourth stand-up comedy special by stand-up comedian Kathy Griffin on Bravo and her sixth overall. It was televised live from the Orpheum Theatre in Los Angeles, California on May 9, 2006, on Bravo.

== Track listing ==
No.	Title	Length
1.	"Introduction"	1:00
2.	"Fired from the red carpet with Star Jones"	4:00
3.	"The Dakota Fanning in rehab joke"	4:20
4.	"Tom Cruise on Oprah"	1:40
5.	"Covering Hurricane Katrina with Anderson Cooper"	2:00
6.	"Oprah gaining weight"	3:00
7.	"Celine Dion"	14:50
8.	"Her vacation in Palm Springs"	13:48
Total length:		44:38

== Personnel ==
Technical and production

- Cori Abraham - executive producer
- Frances Berwick - executive producer
- Tom Bull - supervising producer
- Scott Butler - producer
- Sandy Chanley - executive producer
- Mark Hansson - line producer
- Amy Introcaso - executive producer (as Amy Introcaso-Davis)
- Kelly Luegenbiehl - supervising producer
- Keith Truesdell - producer
- Eban Schletter - music producer
- Joshua Harman - film editor
- Rich Parry - film editor
- Mark Hoffman - production design
- Greg Bell - production associate
- Luis Bonachea - production associate
- Mark Hansson - associate director / stage manager
- Marshall Katz - production secretary
- John Pritchett - technical director
- Mark Reilly - assistant: Sandy Chanley

Visuals and imagery

- Glen Alex - hair stylist
- Adam Christopher - makeup stylist
- Damon Andres - audio: a2
- Larry Reed - sound mixer
- Blaine Stewart - post production audio
- Marvin Bluth - tape operator
- Randy Gomez - camera operator
- Greg Grouwinkel - camera operator
- Marc Hunter - camera operator
- Ritch Kenney - camera operator
- Simon Miles - lighting designer
- Mark Sanford - video operator
- Danny Webb - camera operator
- Kris Wilson - camera operator
- Judith Brewer Curtis - wardrobe stylist
