= A Hell of a Story =

Video by Kathy Griffin
- Released: March 11, 2019
- Recorded: October 29, 2018
- Genre: Comedy
- Producer: Kathy Griffin

Kathy Griffin chronology
Record Breaker (2013)	A Hell of a Story (2019)

A Hell of a Story is a concert film by comedian Kathy Griffin, and her twenty-first special overall. Griffin self-financed the film, which was recorded on October 29, 2018, at the Santa Monica College Performing Arts Center. The special, which describes the aftermath of Griffin posing for a photograph with a replica of the severed head of Donald Trump and subsequently being criminally investigated, was turned down by every television network and streaming service Griffin pitched to. It premiered on March 11, 2019, at South by Southwest. It was given a single-day theatrical release by Fathom Events on July 31, 2019, and released on video on demand on August 13.
