= Allegedly (Kathy Griffin special) =

Video by Kathy Griffin
- Released: November 30, 2004
- Genre: Comedy
- Length: 86:02
- Producer: Kathy Griffin

Kathy Griffin chronology
The D-List (2004)	Allegedly (2004)	Is...Not Nicole Kidman (2005)

Allegedly is a direct-to-DVD special by stand-up comedian Kathy Griffin, and her fourth special overall. It was recorded at Variety Arts Theatre in Los Angeles, California on November 30, 2004. It was later aired on Bravo.

== Summary ==
Griffin recounts run-ins with various A-list celebrities on VH1's red carpet, her USO show in Kuwait, Brooke Shields' mom and her antics at Shields' wedding, and a catty exchange with Barbara Walters on ABC's The View.

== Track listing ==
No.	Title	Length
1.	"Introduction"	1:00
2.	"Pitching a sitcom to NBC"	7:20
3.	"The VH1 Vogue Fashion Awards with Renée Zellweger"	8:00
4.	"Gwyneth Paltrow"	5:00
5.	"The 9/11 celebrity telethon and continued Fashion Awards"	15:00
6.	"Going to the Persian Gulf"	25:00
7.	"Brooke Shields' wedding"	13:00
8.	"The View"	12:42
Total length:		86:02

== Personnel ==
Technical and production

- Tom Bull - supervising producer
- Scott Butler - producer
- Sandy Chanley - executive producer
- Kathy Griffin - executive producer
- Keith Truesdell - producer
- Joshua Harman - film editor
- Mark Hoffman - production design
- Peter Margolis - assistant director
- Marvin Bluth - tape operator
- Thomas Geren - camera operator
- Randy Gomez - camera operator
- Marc Hunter - camera operator
- Simon Miles - lighting designer
- John Palacio Jr. - video operator
- Kris Wilson - camera operator
- Brad Zerbst - camera operator
- Scott Freeman - assistant on-line editor
- Stacy Brewster - production coordinator
- Beau Brower - production associate
- Sean Carter - production associate
- Jaron Greenberg - assistant: Ms. Chanley
- Byron Harris - utilities
- Lea Kamer - production associate
- Frank Linder - utilities
- Peter Margolis - dga stage manager
- John Pritchett - technical director
- Doug Shaffer - production enthusiast

Visuals and imagery

- Sachiko Tanaka - art direction
- Cynthia Bachman Brown - hair stylist / makeup artist
- Larry Elmore - house p.a. mixer
- Scott Heflin - sound: A2
- Larry Reed - sound mixer
- Blaine Stewar - tpost-production audio
