= Balls of Steel (Kathy Griffin special) =

Live album by Kathy Griffin
- Released: October 30, 2012
- Recorded: November 3, 2009
- Genre: Comedy
- Length: 44:01
- Label: Shout! Factory
- Producer: Kathy Griffin

Kathy Griffin chronology
Suckin' It for the Holidays (2009)	Balls of Steel (2012)	Does the Bible Belt (2010)

Balls of Steel is the eighth Bravo stand-up comedy special by stand-up comedian Kathy Griffin, and her tenth overall. It was televised live from the San Diego Civic Theatre in San Diego, California and released on October 30, 2012, on Bravo as a part of The Kathy Griffin Collection: Red, White & Raw.

== Track listing ==
No.	Title	Length
1.	"Introduction"	0:50
2.	"Britney Spears and the Circus tour"	2:35
3.	"Taylor Swift at the VMAs"	1:35
4.	"Maggie Griffin's drinking"	2:30
5.	"Jon and Kate Gosselin"	2:30
6.	"Whitney Houston"	8:40
7.	"Dating Levi Johnston and the 2009 Teen Choice Awards"	8:20
8.	"Divas Live with Paula Abdul"	4:50
9.	"The View with Latoya Jackson"	3:10
10.	"The Jackson family"	6:50
11.	"Losing the Emmys"	2:11
Total length:		44:01

== Personnel ==
Technical and production

- Cori Abraham - executive producer
- Andy Cohen - executive producer
- Kathy Griffin - executive producer
- Jenn Levy - executive producer
- Paul Miller - executive producer
- Kimber Rickabaugh - executive producer
- David W. Foster - film editor
- Bruce Ryan - production design
- Deborah Adamson - production manager
- Cisco Henson - executive in charge of production
- Lesley Maynard - production supervisor
- Gene Crowe - associate director, stage manager

Visuals and imagery

- Adam Christopher - makeup artist
- Giovanni Giuliano - hair
- Jason Dutcher - camera operator
- Darin Haggard - camera operator
- Simon Miles - lighting designer
- Lee Shull - camera operator
- David Neal Stewart - camera operator

== Award and nominations ==
The live Bravo performance special was nominated for the Emmy for Outstanding Picture Editing For A Special (Single Or Multi-Camera) in the 62nd Primetime Emmy Awards.
