= Kathy Griffin =

American comedian and actress (born 1960)

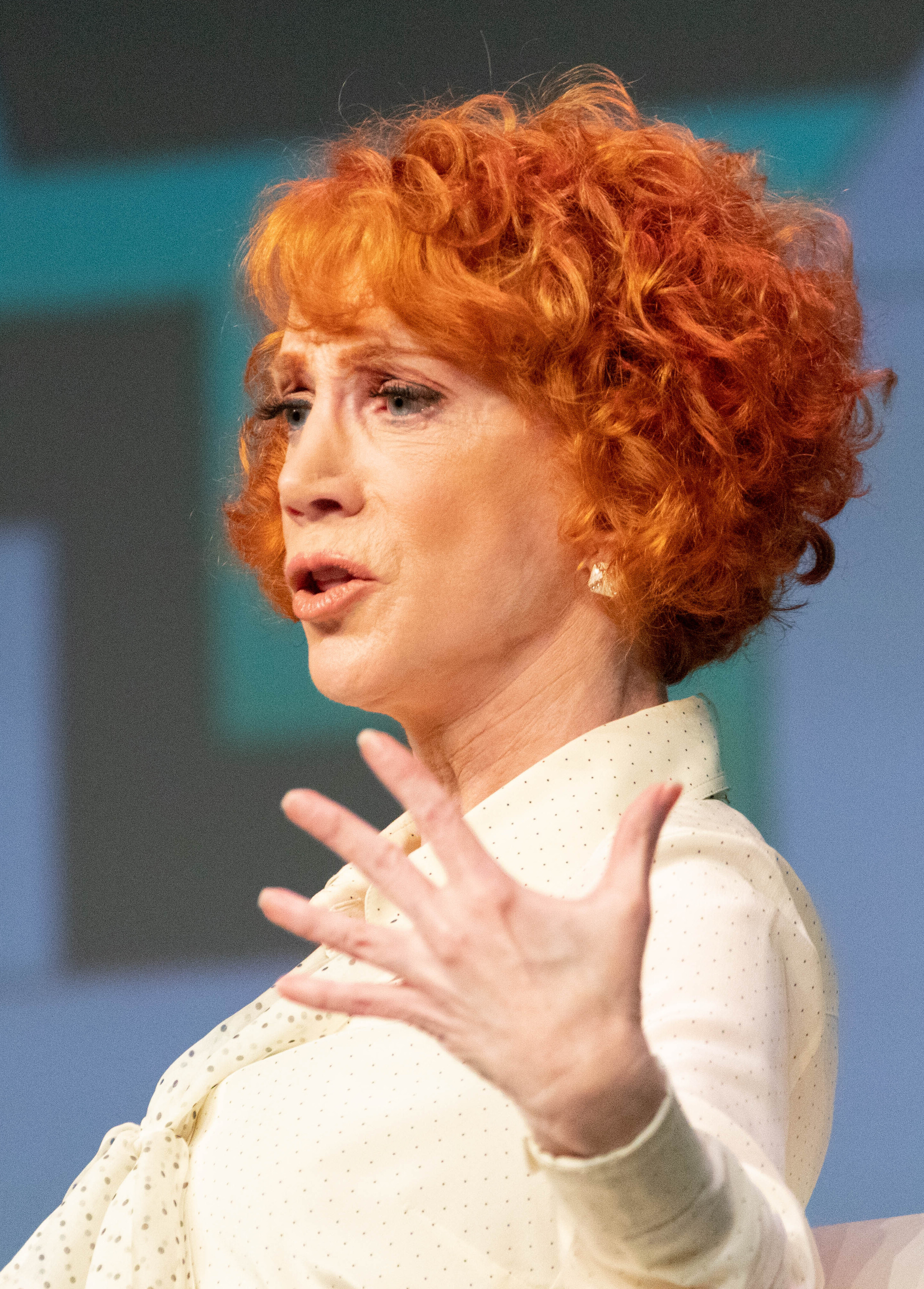
- Griffin at South by Southwest 2019
- Born: Kathleen Mary Griffin; November 4, 1960 (age 66); Oak Park, Illinois, U.S.
- Spouses: Matt Moline (m. 2001; div. 2006) Randy Bick (m. 2020; div. 2025)

Comedy career
- Years active: 1980–present
- Medium: Stand-up; television
- Genres: Observational comedy; blue comedy; black comedy; improvisational comedy
- Subjects: Popular culture; current events; Catholicism; LGBTQ community; Irish-American culture
- Website: kathygriffin.com

Kathleen Mary Griffin (born November 4, 1960) is an American comedian and actress who has starred in television series, comedy specials and has released multiple comedy albums. In 2007 and 2008, Griffin won Primetime Emmy Awards for her reality show Kathy Griffin: My Life on the D-List. She has also appeared in supporting roles in films.

Griffin was born in Oak Park, Illinois, a suburb of Chicago. In 1978, she moved to Los Angeles, where she studied drama at the Lee Strasberg Theatre and Film Institute and became a member of the improvisational comedy troupe The Groundlings. In the 1990s, Griffin began performing as a stand-up comedian and appeared as a guest star on television shows, and then had a supporting role on the NBC sitcom Suddenly Susan (1996–2000).

The Bravo reality show Kathy Griffin: My Life on the D-List (2005–2010) became a ratings hit for the network and earned her two Emmy Awards for Outstanding Reality Program. Griffin has released six comedy albums, all of which received nominations at the Grammy Awards. Her first album For Your Consideration (2008) made her the first female comedian to debut at the top of the Billboard Top Comedy Albums chart. She eventually won the Grammy for Best Comedy Album in 2014. Griffin has recorded numerous standup comedy specials for HBO and Bravo. For the latter network, she has recorded sixteen television specials, breaking the Guinness World record for the number of aired television specials on any network. In 2011, she also became the first comedian to have four specials televised in a year. She has also released an autobiography, Official Book Club Selection: A Memoir According to Kathy Griffin (2009).

Griffin is known for her controversial style and statements about celebrities, religion and sexuality, including holding a mask stylized as Donald Trump's severed head in 2017, which provoked a United States Secret Service investigation and later became the basis of her concert film A Hell of a Story (2019).

== Early life ==
Kathleen Mary Griffin was born on November 4, 1960, in the Chicago suburb Oak Park, Illinois, to first-generation Irish-Americans Margaret Mary Griffin (née Corbally) (1920–2020), who was a cashier at a hospital in Oak Park, and John Patrick Griffin (1916–2007), an employee at a RadioShack. She has four older siblings. Griffin grew up Catholic. She described growing up in a "dysfunctional" and "Irish alcoholic" family.

Kathy's eldest brother Kenneth "Kenny" John Griffin (1942–2001) was a pedophile, drug addict and homeless at various times. When Kathy was 7, Kenny, who was 18 years older, sexually abused her and would climb into her bed and whisper into her ears. She did not tell her parents until she was in her 20s, at which point Kenny admitted his pedophilia to them. For many years, Kathy was "shunned" by her own family because she tried to get Kenny arrested after learning he had abused other children. She was "afraid of him until the moment he died" because of his violent, abusive nature. "...two of his girlfriends confessed to me he also physically abused them very violently and I called the LAPD about it twice."

Griffin described herself during her early years as being "a kid who needed to talk, all the time". She would often visit her neighbors to tell them stories about her family; she has referred to those visits as her first live shows where she learned "the power of juicy material". After most of her siblings had moved, Griffin developed a binge eating disorder. In her 2009 autobiography Official Book Club Selection, Griffin said she "still suffers [from food issues]" but has learned to "deal with them".

At elementary school, Griffin began to develop a dislike for organized religion because of the punishments she and other "vulnerable" students received from the nuns. At her high school, she sought refuge in musical theater, playing roles such as Rosemary in How to Succeed in Business Without Really Trying and Hodel in Fiddler on the Roof. During her senior year, she wanted to become a professional actor. Her first appearance on television was as an extra on a Chicago White Sox commercial, and she was signed with several Chicago talent agencies. At 18, Griffin persuaded her parents to move to Los Angeles to help her become famous.

At 19, Griffin attended a performance by the improvisational group The Groundlings. She said, "I thought this is where I want to be. This is the greatest thing in the world."

== Career ==
=== Stand-up comedy, television and film ===
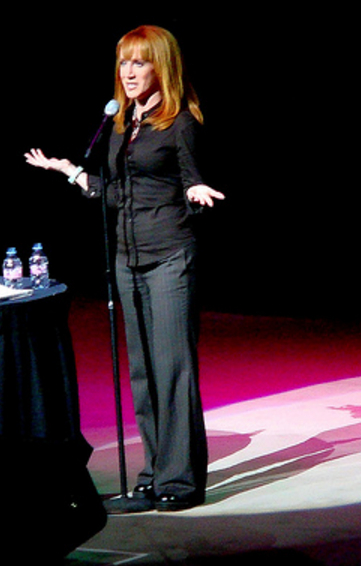
Griffin performing stand up in Las Vegas in 2008

Griffin began performing in the early 1990s in the Los Angeles improvisational comedy troupe The Groundlings. She went on to perform standup comedy and became part of the alternative comedy scene in Los Angeles. With Janeane Garofalo, she created a standup act called "Hot Cup of Talk", which became the title of her 1998 solo HBO special. Griffin earned a number of television and film credits during the 1990s. She appeared in Julie Brown's Medusa: Dare to Be Truthful, a Showtime parody of the 1991 Madonna film Truth or Dare. Griffin twice appeared as Susan Klein, a reporter on NBC's The Fresh Prince of Bel-Air; it was her television sitcom debut.

On June 12, 2008, Griffin hosted the first Bravo! Canada A-List Awards, which included a parody of the "wardrobe malfunction" experienced by Janet Jackson in the Super Bowl halftime show in 2004. She also hosted the 2009 Bravo A-List Awards, which aired on April 15, 2009, and her Bravo special Kathy Griffin: She'll Cut a Bitch aired beforehand. Shout! Factory released an extended version of the show on DVD in early 2010.

On September 8, 2009, Ballantine Books published Griffin's memoir, titled Official Book Club Selection: A Memoir According to Kathy Griffin, which debuted at number one on The New York Times Best Seller list. A week prior, she released her second comedy album Suckin' It for the Holidays; it was her second bid to win a Grammy Award. It was announced on November 3, 2009, that Griffin was to host ABC's new show Let's Dance, on which celebrity contestants would have re-enacted famous dance routines while competing for a $250,000 grand prize for their favorite charity.

Griffin hosted CNN's New Year's Eve broadcast on December 31, 2009, along with Anderson Cooper. As Cooper talked about the balloon boy hoax, Griffin said "fucking". Although Griffin was rumored to have been banned from future CNN broadcasts, she co-hosted the show with Cooper until 2017. In 2017, CNN terminated Griffin from its New Year's Eve Broadcast after Griffin showed pictures of herself holding a bloody, model severed head resembling President Donald Trump. Griffin has also guest-starred in a 2009 episode of Law & Order: Special Victims Unit, playing a lesbian activist.

Since the 2008 presidential election, Griffin has made frequent jokes about Republican vice-presidential contender Sarah Palin and her family. On US television program Glee, Griffin parodied Palin posing as a judge at a regional singing competition. Griffin also made fun of Christine O'Donnell in the show by stating, "Before we start, I would like to say I am not a witch".

On January 7, 2012, it was announced that Griffin would host a weekly one-hour talk show on the channel Kathy, which would consist of standup routines, "rant about pop culture", and celebrity interviews. On April 8, 2013, during a live standup performance in Cincinnati, Ohio, Griffin announced that her show would not be renewed for a third season. She confirmed it later on her Twitter account. According to FOX 411, Bravo was planning to film several comedy specials starring Griffin after the show ended.

On June 13, 2014, it was announced that Griffin would host the 41st Daytime Emmy Awards. For the first time in the event's four-decade history, the show bypassed a network television airing for a live online streaming media event. The ceremony took place on June 22, 2014. Griffin's performance was well received by critics.

=== Guest co-host of The View ===
Kathy Griffin served as a co-host of The View from May 2007 to September 2007, replacing the recently departed Rosie O'Donnell. She declined to discuss the ban on Access Hollywood. As of August 2009, Griffin had been un-banned from The View and was a guest on September 18, 2009, and June 15, 2010. In an interview on The Talk, Griffin said that she has been re-banned from The View due to an argument with its co-host Elisabeth Hasselbeck.

=== Laugh Your Head Off World Tour 2017–2018 ===
In August 2017, Griffin announced a worldwide comedy tour. The title "Laugh Your Head Off" was a reference to her depiction of an effigy of U.S. President Donald Trump's severed head. The tour visited major cities in Singapore, Australia, Germany, Sweden, the United Kingdom, and many more European, and Asian cities. Several shows sold out within minutes of going on sale, leading to Griffin adding several shows to the lineup. She continued with a North America leg of the tour, commencing May 23, 2018, in Ottawa, Ontario and including both Radio City Music Hall and Carnegie Hall in New York City.

== Controversies ==
=== Various talk shows bans ===
Griffin said she was banned from appearing on several television shows including The Tonight Show with Jay Leno and The View. She was re-banned from The View after making a joke about Barbara Walters. Griffin made a joke during a 2005 E! televised event saying that eleven-year-old actor Dakota Fanning had entered drug rehabilitation.

=== Emmy Awards controversy ===
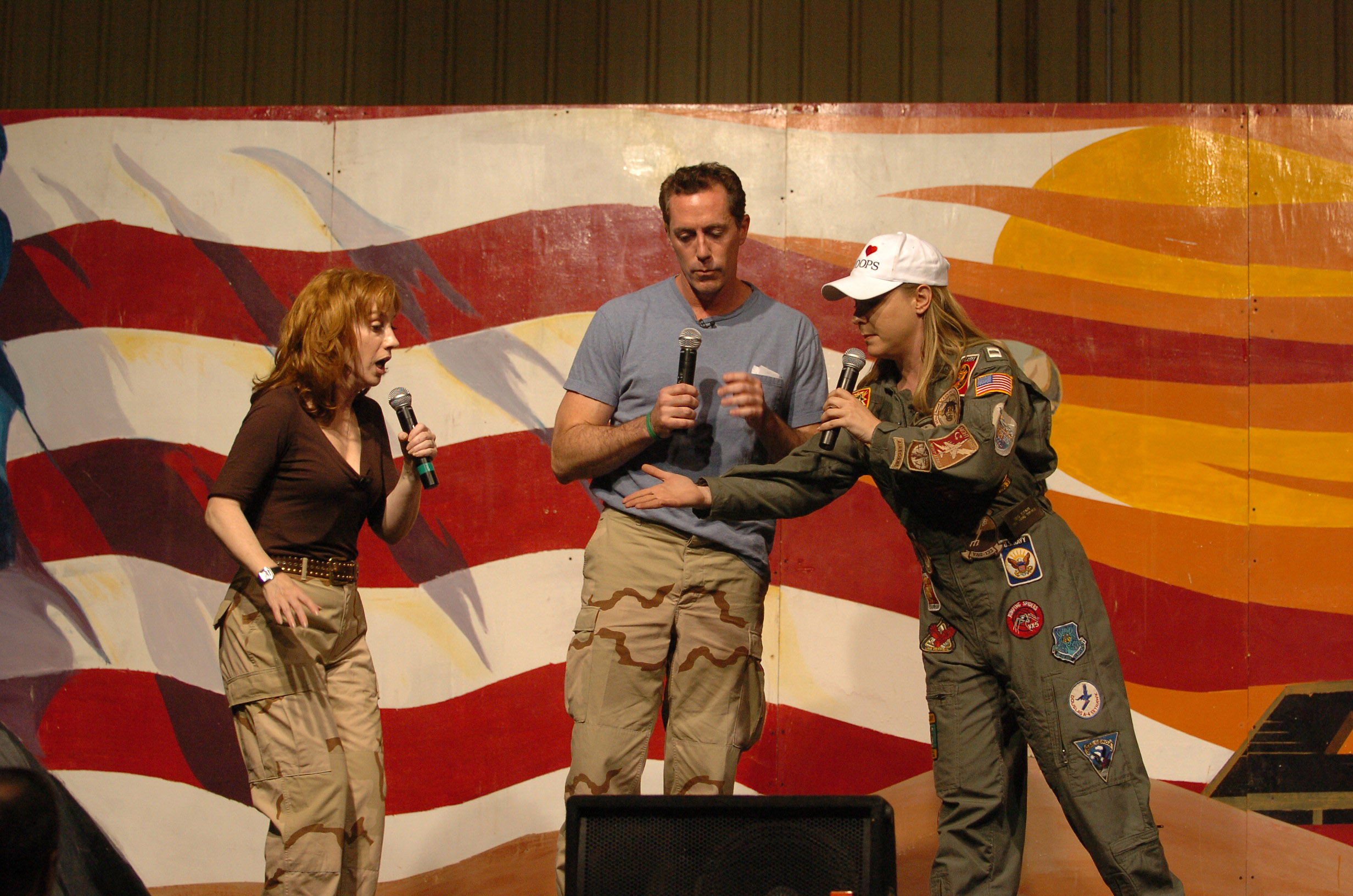
Griffin, Michael McDonald, and Karri Turner perform an improvisational skit for soldiers and airmen in Tikrit, Iraq in 2006.

The second season of My Life on the D-List, which premiered June 2006, earned Griffin the 2007 Primetime Emmy for Outstanding Reality Program in non-competition. She received it during the Creative Arts Emmy Awards, which was hosted by Carlos Mencia and aired on E! in September. Griffin said,

Now, a lot of people come up here and thank Jesus for this award. I want you to know that no one had less to do with this award than Jesus. He didn't help me a bit. If it was up to him, Cesar Millan would be up here with that damn dog. So all I can say is suck it, Jesus, this award is my God now!

Griffin later said that she meant the remark to be a satire of celebrities who thank Jesus for their awards, especially artists who are controversial in their speech and actions, rather than as a slight on Jesus. The academy said her "offensive remarks will not be part of the E! telecast on Saturday night". Griffin said that she was fired from an appearance on Hannah Montana because of her Emmy acceptance speech.

=== Ban from Apollo Theater ===
In a July 2009 episode of My Life on the D-List, Griffin used profanity in an Octomom joke during her routine at New York's Apollo Theater. Griffin said that she received a letter banning her from the venue.

=== Depiction of Donald Trump ===
On May 30, 2017, Griffin posted a video of herself holding "a mask styled to look like the severed, bloody head" of U.S. President Donald Trump. It was posted on her Instagram and Twitter accounts. She wrote: "I caption this 'there was blood coming out of his eyes, blood coming out of his ... wherever'", referencing a comment Trump had made about Megyn Kelly. The video was from a session with photographer Tyler Shields, who is known for producing "shocking" imagery. Griffin later took down the image and apologized for posting the image, saying that she went too far and adding, "I beg for your forgiveness".

On June 2, 2017, Lisa Bloom, an attorney for Griffin, stated, "Like many edgy works of artistic expression, the photo could be interpreted different ways. But Griffin never imagined that it could be misinterpreted as a threat of violence against Trump. That was never what she intended. She has never threatened or committed an act of violence against anyone." Griffin said the Trump family was "trying to ruin my life forever".

In May 2017, Griffin was dropped by Squatty Potty as a spokesperson. CNN fired her from its New Year's Eve broadcast with Anderson Cooper. Cooper said, "For the record, I am appalled by the photo shoot Kathy Griffin took part in. It is clearly disgusting and completely inappropriate." All of Griffin's remaining scheduled tour dates were canceled by their venues. During an interview on Australian television in August 2017, Griffin talked about the photo, saying, "Stop acting like my little picture is more important than talking about the actual atrocities that the president of the United States is committing". In November 2017, she appeared on Skavlan where she said, "I take that apology back by the way. I take it back big time". He said she had received a lot of bad advice at the time.

On October 28, 2017, Griffin uploaded a YouTube video titled "Kathy Griffin: A Hell of a Story", which is about the backlash she received for the Trump photo controversy. It was the basis for her A Hell of a Story concert film. Griffin has stated she was under federal investigation for roughly two months and placed on the No Fly List, and that she was added to the Interpol and Five Eyes watch lists, resulting in detentions at airports throughout her Laugh Your Head Off world tour. The federal investigation closed in 2017 without charges; Griffin said she had been "completely exonerated."

On November 4, 2020 (her 60th birthday and the day after the 2020 United States presidential election), Griffin once again posted a photo of herself with a model of Donald Trump's bloody, severed head.

=== Twitter suspension ===
On November 6, 2022, Griffin was suspended from Twitter for impersonating Elon Musk. Griffin used his profile photo and changed her name on the service, tweeting under his name imploring people to vote for Democrats in the upcoming midterm elections and encouraging them to retweet and spread her post. She also posted that she, posing as Musk, had decided to vote blue to support women's rights. Musk tweeted the same day that anyone impersonating a public figure would be permanently suspended unless the account was clearly marked as parody. On the next day, Griffin posted on her deceased mother's Twitter account, calling Musk an "asshole". She further challenged the site's policy that she had used her Twitter profile for impersonation. Musk tweeted sardonically in reply to another tweet, "Actually she was suspended for impersonating a comedian." On November 18, Elon Musk announced that her account has been reinstated due to new rules concerning "negative/hate tweets".

== Style of humor ==
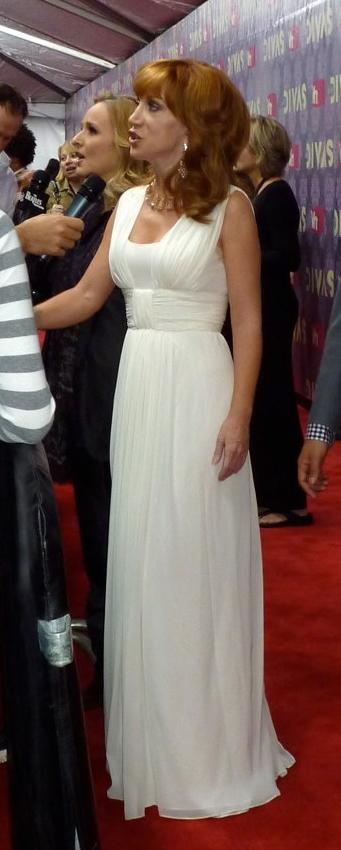
Griffin at the VH1 Divas Awards in 2009

Griffin developed her love of popular culture through her immediate and extended family, who were frequently commenting about the latest news. She said; "I may have been into The Brady Bunch like every other kid, but I also wanted to watch John Lennon and Yoko Ono on The Dick Cavett Show, and every minute of the Watergate hearings. It was fear of the dinner table that got me hooked." She has also named her mother Maggie as influential in her consumption of pop culture, calling her "the ideal audience for the Hollywood dish". Griffin named the character Rhoda Morgenstern of 1970s sitcom The Mary Tyler Moore Show as an influence.

Griffin established her career with candid observations of everyday life and her dating experiences, later focusing on mocking celebrities; her act currently consists of embellished stories involving celebrities. Griffin hopes people understand that no malice is intended by her humor. "I'm genuinely a fan of most of the people I trash in the act", she said; "I really, really try and focus on making fun of people for their behavior. I'm not so into making fun of someone for the way they look, or something that's out of their control."

Griffin is sometimes the object of her own humor, particularly with regard to her D-list status. She portrays herself as a Hollywood outsider and has a group of close celebrity friends such as Rosie O'Donnell, Joan Rivers, Jerry Seinfeld, Gloria Estefan, and Lance Bass. Her longtime friendship with Bass was the catalyst for a feud between Griffin and gossip blogger Perez Hilton.

In 2007, Griffin commented on her aversion to making fun of celebrity friends; "There's nothing I won't do, but on the other hand I'm full of shit because that changes". Griffin and Hilton ended their feud after the death of Griffin's father, and Hilton appeared on an episode of Griffin's show in 2007.

== LGBT rights and political advocacy ==
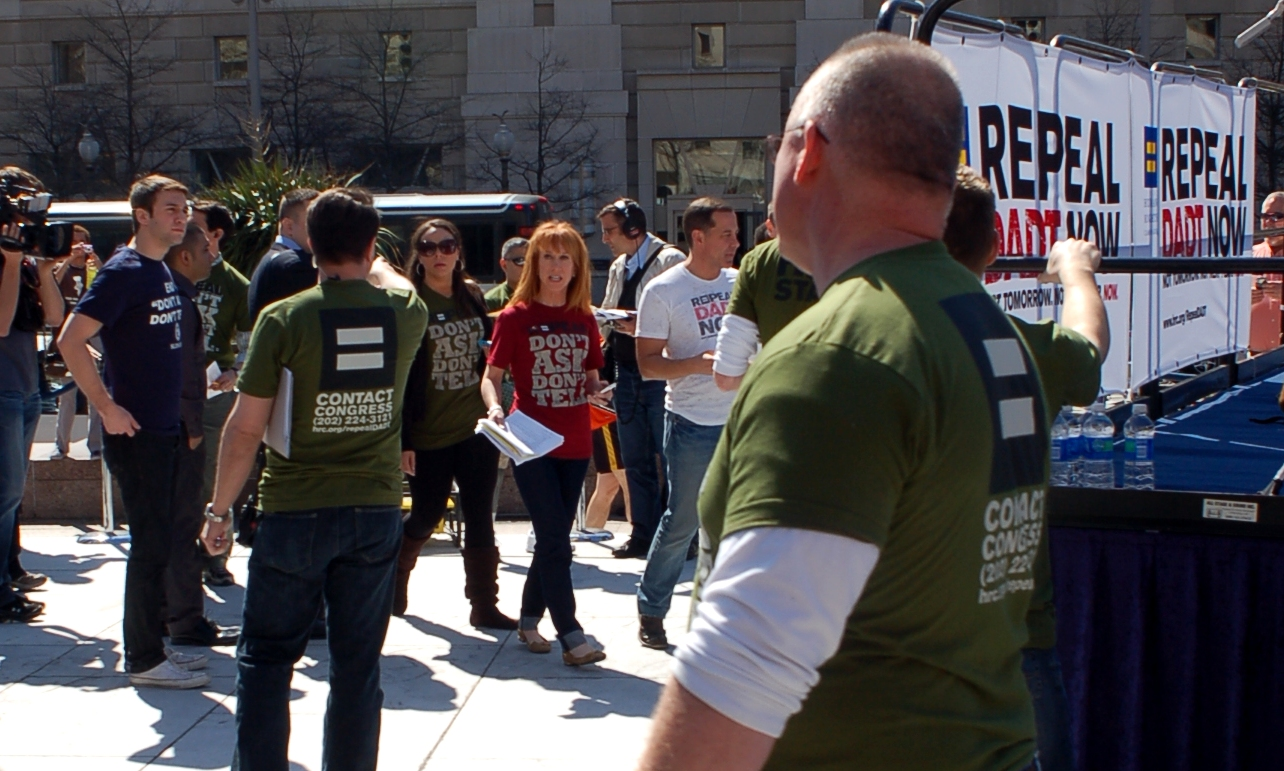
Griffin arriving at the rally to Repeal "Don't Ask, Don't Tell" (Freedom Plaza, Washington, D.C.)

Griffin is a supporter for LGBT rights including same-sex marriage. She has protested with fellow proponents in West Hollywood, California and included the footage from protests on her reality show Kathy Griffin: My Life on the D-List. Her mother was also a supporter of LGBT rights during her lifetime. She was often seen on the same television shows protesting alongside her daughter. Prior to the Proposition 8 ballot results, Griffin volunteered for the Los Angeles Gay and Lesbian Center's "Vote for Equality" campaign, going door-to-door asking Los Angeles residents for their opinion of LGBT marriage rights.

In March 2010, Griffin helped organize a rally in Washington, D.C., to advocate the repeal of "Don't ask, don't tell". She said that she organized the rally after meeting with several closeted gay people serving in Iraq and Afghanistan. Griffin held meetings with several Members of Congress to encourage its repeal; she also organized a rally in Freedom Plaza.

Griffin caused controversy when she confronted Republican Congresswoman Michele Bachmann over her views on homosexuality at the 2010 Radio and Television Correspondents' Association Dinner; according to Griffin, she asked Bachmann "were you born a bigot or did you grow into it", a reference to Bachmann's belief that homosexuality is strictly environmental. Griffin said Bachmann replied, "That's a good question, I'll have to think about that". Bachmann's office confirmed the exchange but said Griffin confronted Bachmann after Bachmann approached Griffin to compliment her appearance.

Griffin is a long-time supporter of the Aid for AIDS annual fundraiser Best in Drag Show in Los Angeles, and hosted the opening of the show for more than five years. In November 2009, Aid For AIDS presented Kathy Griffin with an AFA Angel Award at their silver anniversary celebration.

Griffin is a long-time critic of Sarah Palin and has made fun of Palin's daughter, Bristol Palin, using the Palin family as material for her comedy routines. In March 2011, Sarah Palin responded to Griffin by calling her a "bully". In her reality television show, Griffin visited the Palin family home in Wasilla, Alaska, and invited Palin to attend her stand-up show in Anchorage, Alaska. Griffin has also poked fun at Willow Palin as a result of Palin's Facebook statements on homosexuality.

In 2020, Griffin hosted the Str8Up Gay Porn Awards.

She was named the 2025 Advocate of the Year by the magazine The Advocate; an article in the magazine about this stated, "The Advocate is highlighting her bold activism and utterly unique humor by selecting her as our 2025 Advocate of the Year."

== Personal life ==
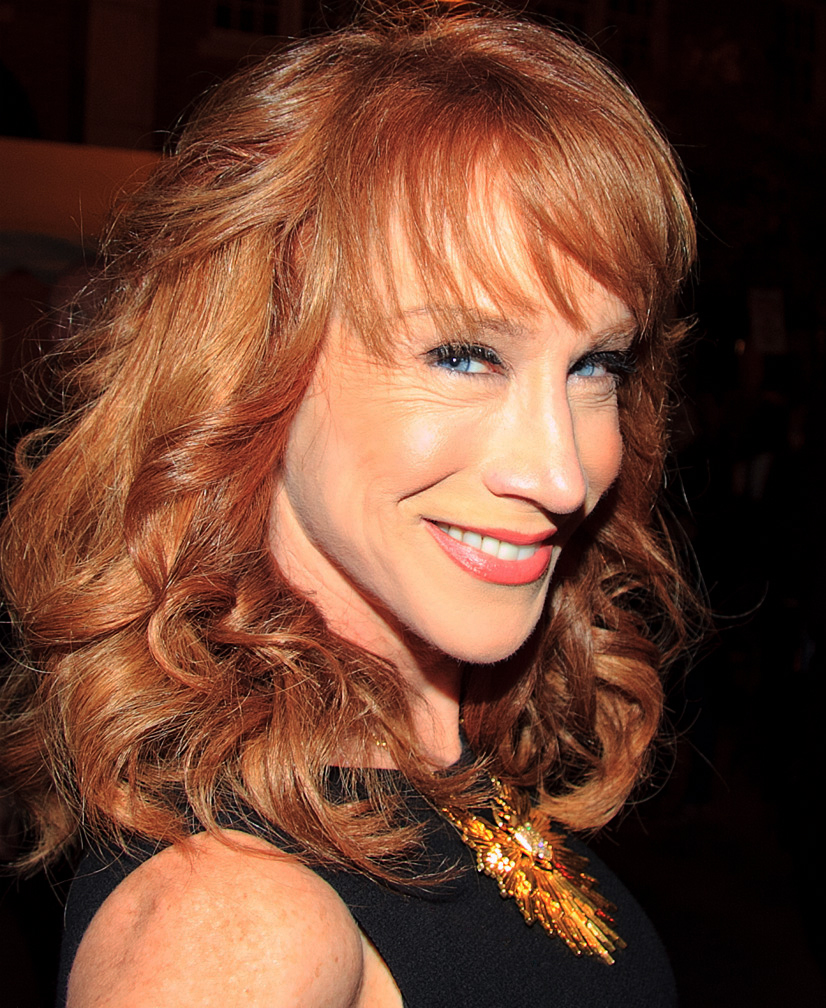
Griffin at the 2011 Toronto International Film Festival

In a 2006 interview, Griffin said she does not drink alcohol in spite of growing up in a family where she was surrounded by "lots" of alcoholism. She said, "I still think that if I would've taken a drink, I think I would have become an alcoholic very quickly." By June 2020, Griffin developed an addiction to prescription drugs.

Griffin's estranged eldest brother, Kenny, died from a drug overdose in October 2001. Her brother Gary died of esophageal cancer in 2014. Her sister, Joyce Patricia Griffin, died in September 2017 from an undisclosed form of cancer. Kathy had shaved her head in solidarity with her in late July.

Her father, John Patrick Griffin, died of heart failure in 2007. Her mother, Maggie, died on March 17, 2020. In a post on her social media accounts, Griffin said, "I am gutted. My best friend. I am shaking. I won't ever be prepared. I'm so grateful you guys got to be part of her life. You knew her. You loved her. She knew it. Oh, and OF COURSE she went on St. Patrick's Day."

In 1999, Griffin nearly died during a liposuction procedure in Los Angeles. She has undergone multiple plastic surgeries including breast augmentation and a nose job.

She placed 17th on Oxygen's 2007 list of "The 50 Funniest Women Alive". In 2009, a Golden Palm Star on the Palm Springs, California, Walk of Stars was dedicated to her.

Griffin is an atheist. Speaking to Sacramento's Outword Magazine, Griffin said: "I think I'm getting more atheist because of the way the country is getting more into bible-thumping". In her book Official Book Club Selection: A Memoir According to Kathy Griffin, Griffin said that while in high school, she fell away from Catholicism. She considered becoming a Unitarian but was not sure what that would involve. In 2008, Griffin became an ordained minister with the Universal Life Church to officiate at the wedding of two fans.

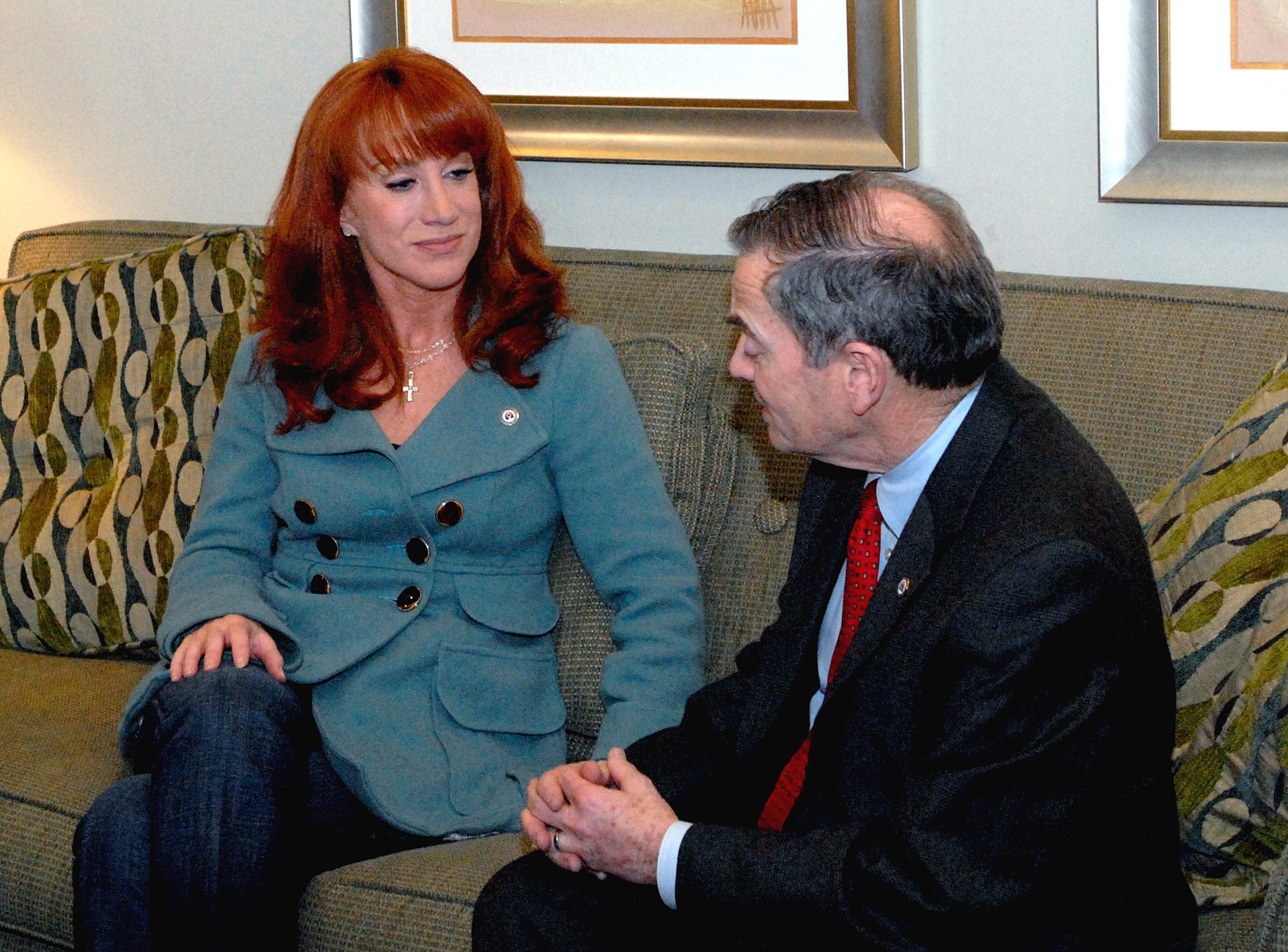
Griffin and Jim Weiskopf of the Fisher House Foundation during her visit to Walter Reed Army Medical Center in April 2008

She is an opponent of LASIK eye surgery, having had a series of operations that left her partially blind in one eye with a visible eyeball deformity.

In August 2021, she announced that she had been diagnosed with lung cancer although she is not a smoker, and needed to have half of her left lung removed. She underwent surgery the same month.

In April 2023, Griffin revealed she was diagnosed with an "extreme case" of complex post-traumatic stress disorder.

Griffin lived in the Hollywood Hills from 2004 to 2016. Since then, she has resided in Bel Air.

=== Marriages and relationships ===
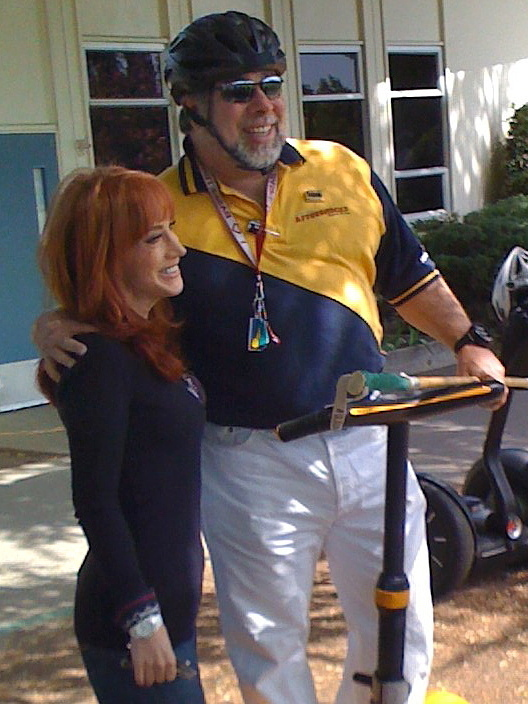
Kathy Griffin with her then-boyfriend Steve Wozniak in April 2008

Griffin married computer administrator Matt Moline in 2001, after being introduced by Moline's sister, television producer Rebecca Moline. They divorced in May 2006. On Larry King Live, Griffin accused Moline of stealing $72,000 from her; Moline did not respond to the allegation publicly but said that he was saddened by it.

In July 2007, rumors that Griffin was dating Apple co-founder Steve Wozniak circulated. Griffin and Wozniak attended the 2007 Emmy Awards together. On Tom Green's House Tonight on February 6, 2008, Griffin confirmed her relationship with Wozniak. Wozniak and Griffin served as King and Queen of the Humane Society of Silicon Valley Fur Ball on April 5, 2008, in Santa Clara, California. In June 2008, it was confirmed that Griffin and Wozniak were no longer dating.

On August 9, 2009, Griffin attended the Teen Choice Awards with Levi Johnston and then interviewed him on Larry King Live. In the interview, Griffin and Johnston joked that they were in a serious relationship.

On March 7, 2011, while appearing on The Howard Stern Show, Griffin announced that she was romantically involved with actor and former NFL practice-squad player Isaiah Mustafa. He later said that he was single.

In the same interview, she said that the previous July, she had ended a four-year relationship with a man she did not identify but said he is "a regular guy with a regular job", and that it was a "messy breakup". It was later revealed that the man is Griffin's tour manager, who had appeared on several seasons of My Life on the D List.

From 2012 until November 2018, Griffin was in a relationship with marketing executive Randy Bick. They also reconciled in April 2019. Griffin married Bick at her home on January 1, 2020, in a ceremony officiated by comedian Lily Tomlin. On December 29, 2023, Griffin filed for divorce from Bick, citing irreconcilable differences. The divorce was finalized on January 13, 2025.

== Filmography ==
=== Film ===
Year	Title	Role	Notes
1980	Battle Beyond the Stars	Alien Extra	
1980	Fade to Black	Grauman's Chinese Theater Extra	
1984	Streets of Fire	Concertgoer	
1991	The Unborn	Connie	
1991	Shakes the Clown	Lucy	
1991	Medusa: Dare to Be Truthful	Taffy	TV movie
1994	Pulp Fiction	Hit-and-run witness	
1994	It's Pat	Herself	
1995	Four Rooms	Betty	
1995	The Barefoot Executive	Mary	TV movie
1996	The Cable Guy	Cable Boy's Mother	
1997	The Big Fall	Sally	Video
1997	Who's the Caboose?	Katty	
1997	Trojan War	Cashier	
1997	Courting Courtney	Ona Miller	
1999	Can't Stop Dancing	Modeling agent	
1999	Dill Scallion	Tina	
1999	Muppets from Space	Female armed guard	
1999	Jackie's Back	Herself	TV movie
2000	Lion of Oz	Caroline	Voice role
2000	The Intern	Cornelia Crisp	
2000	Enemies of Laughter	Cindy	
2000	A Diva's Christmas Carol	Ghost of Christmas Past	TV film
2001	On Edge	Karen Katz	
2002	Run Ronnie Run!	Herself	
2003	Beethoven's 5th	Evie Kling	
2005	Dirty Love	Madame Pelly	
2005	Dinotopia: Quest for the Ruby Sunstone	Rhoga	Voice role, direct-to–video
2005	Her Minor Thing	Maggie	
2005	Love Wrecked	Belinda	
2006	Bachelor Party Vegas	Spaghetti Wrestling She-Elvis	Uncredited cameo
2007	Judy Toll: The Funniest Woman You've Never Heard of	Herself	Documentary
2007	In Search of Puppy Love	Herself	Documentary
2007	Mr. Warmth: The Don Rickles Project	Herself	Documentary
2007	Heckler	Herself	Documentary
2010	A Turtle's Tale: Sammy's Adventures	Vera	Voice role
2010	Shrek Forever After	Taran	Voice role
2010	Joan Rivers: A Piece of Work	Herself	Documentary
2011	The Muppets	Herself	Scene removed from theatrical release
2011	Hall Pass	Herself	
2015	Being Canadian	Herself	Documentary
2019	Kathy Griffin: A Hell Of A Story	Herself	Documentary
2021	Hysterical	Herself	Documentary

=== Television ===
Television
Year	Title	Role	Notes
1989–1991	On the Television	Various	Episode: "Beauty and the Beast"
1989–1991	The Fresh Prince of Bel-Air		
1990	The Fresh Prince of Bel-Air	Susan Klein	Episode: "Not With My Pig, You Don't"
1993	Civil Wars	Yvonne	Episode: "Watt, Me Worry?"
1993	Dream On	Dawn	Episode: "The French Conception"
1995	ER	Dolores Minky	Episode: "Motherhood"
1995	Dweebs	Sheila	Episode: "The Birthday Party Show"
1995	Mad About You	Brenda	Episode: "New Year's Eve"
1996	Ellen	Peggy	Episode: "Oh, Sweet Rapture"
1996	Partners	Michelle	Episode: "Can We Keep Her, Dad?"
1996	Caroline in the City	DMV clerk	Episode: "Caroline and the Movie"
1996	Dr. Katz, Professional Therapist	Herself	Episode: "Koppleman and Katz"
1996	Saturday Night Special	Herself	2 episodes
1995–1996	Ned and Stacey	Jeanne	2 episodes
1997	Oddville, MTV		Episode: August 13, 1997
1997	The Wonderful World of Disney	Mary	Episode: "The New Barefoot Executive"
1996–1998	Seinfeld	Sally Weaver	Episode: "The Cartoon" and "The Doll"
1997–1998	Premium Blend	Herself	Hostess
1999	Rock & Roll Jeopardy!	Herself	Celebrity edition
2000	The X-Files	Betty Templeton/Lulu Pfeiffer	Episode: "Fight Club"
2000	Curb Your Enthusiasm	Herself	Episode: "The Pants Tent"
1999–2000	Dilbert	Alice	Voice role (uncredited)
1996–2000	Suddenly Susan	Vicki Groener	Main role; 93 episodes
2001	The Simpsons	Francine	Episode: "Bye Bye Nerdie"
2001	Strong Medicine	Matchmaker	Episode: "Silent Epidemic"
2001	Weakest Link	Herself	Episode: "Comedians Special"
2001	Who Wants to Be a Millionaire	Herself	"Comedy Edition"
2001	Kathy's So-Called Reality	Herself	Hostess
2002	The Drew Carey Show	Kathy	Episode: "The Eagle Has Landed"
2002	The Anna Nicole Show	Herself	Christmas special
2003	What's New, Scooby-Doo?	Luis Agent Autumn Summerfield	Episode: "The Unnatural" (voice role)
2003	Spider-Man: The New Animated Series	Roxanne Gaines	Voice; episode: "Mind Games"
2003	Crank Yankers	Marion Simons	Voice; episode: "Jim Florentine & Kathy Griffin"
2003	The Mole	Herself	Season 3 winner
2002–2003	Whose Line Is It Anyway?	Herself	4 episodes (5–02, 5–15, 5–19, 5–29)
2002	National Lampoon's Funny Money	Herself	Episode 1 (guest comedian)
2003	Average Joe	Host, Season 1	
2004	Stripperella	The Bridesmaid	Voice, 2 episodes
2004	Half & Half	Dr. Morgan	Episode: "The Big Labor of Love Episode"
2004	Celebrity Poker Showdown	Herself	Two episodes, third tournament
2001–2004	Hollywood Squares	Herself	86 episodes
2005	Cheap Seats	Rae	Episode: "1995 SuperDogs! Superjocks!"
2005	Days of Our Lives	Limo driver	
2005	All-Star Reality Reunion	Herself	Hostess
2006	Gameshow Marathon	Herself	Episode: "Match Game"
2007	Ugly Betty	Fashion TV anchor	Episode: "In or Out"
2007	Loose Women	Herself	
2008	Rosie Live	Herself	Impersonated Nancy Grace
2008	Dog Whisperer with Cesar Millan	Herself	Season 4, episode 24
2009	Privileged	Olivia	Episode: "All About a Brand New You"
2009	Paris Hilton's My New BFF	Herself	Episode: "Must Have Thick Skin" (special guest)
2008–2010	Larry King Live	Herself	Six episodes
2009	The Comedy Central Roast of Joan Rivers	Herself	Roast Master
2009	The Celebrity Apprentice 2	Herself	Special guest
2009	Who Wants to Be a Millionaire	Herself	Celebrity question presenter
2005–2010	Kathy Griffin: My Life on the D-List	47 episodes Gracie Allen Award for Outstanding Lead Actress in a Comedy Series	
2010	Law & Order: Special Victims Unit	Babs Duffy	Episode: "P.C."
2010	RuPaul's Drag Race	Guest judge	Episode: "Gone With The Windows"
2010	The Marriage Ref	Guest judge	Episode: "Tracy Morgan, Kathy Griffin, and Nathan Lane"
2010	Last Comic Standing	Performer	Season 7 finale
2010	Shep & Tiffany Watch TV: The Best of 2010		Executive producer
2011	Glee	Tammy Jean Albertson	Episode: "Original Song"
2011	Same Name	Herself	Season 1, episode 2
2011	Drop Dead Diva	Jenna Kaswell-Bailey	Episode: "He Said, She Said"
2011	America's Next Top Model	Guest Judge	Season 17, episode 7
2012	American Dad!	Kelly Wilk	Voice, episode: "The Kidney Stays in the Picture"
2012	Whitney	Lindsay	Episode: "Codependence Day"
2012	The Rosie Show	Herself	
2012	Rachael vs. Guy: Celebrity Cook-Off	Herself	Season 2, episode 6: "Star Studded Supper"
2012–2013	Kathy	Host	Talk show
2013	Cyndi Lauper: Still So Unusual	Herself	Episode: "No Voice, No Choice"
2014	Kirstie	Herself	Episode: "The Girl Next Door"
2014	Big Brother 16	Herself	Episode 25
2015	Fashion Police	Host	Talk show
2015	RuPaul's Drag Race	Guest judge	2 episodes
2015	Big Brother 17	Herself	Episode 5
2016	Lopez	Herself	Episode: "George Doubles Down"
2018	Make America Great-a-Thon: A President Show Special and A President Show Documentary: The Fall of Donald Trump	Kellyanne Conway	TV special
2018	Funny You Should Ask	Herself	9 episodes
2019	Crank Yankers	Herself (voice)	Episode: "Jimmy Kimmel, Kathy Griffin & Jeff Ross"
2019	You	Herself	Episode: "Farewell, My Bunny"
2022	Search Party	Liquorice Montague	Recurring
2023	Jimmy Kimmel Live!	Herself - Guest	Episode: October 3
2023	Futurama	Captain Cranky	Voice, episode: "Zapp Gets Canceled"

=== Music videos ===
Year	Song	Artist	Role
2000	"The Real Slim Shady"	Eminem	Nurse

== Stand-up specials ==
- HBO Comedy Half-Hour (1996)
- Kathy Griffin: Hot Cup of Talk (1998)
- Kathy Griffin: The D-List (2004)
- Kathy Griffin: Allegedly (2004)
- Kathy Griffin Is...Not Nicole Kidman (2005)
- Kathy Griffin: Strong Black Woman (2006)
- Kathy Griffin: Everybody Can Suck It (2007)
- Kathy Griffin: Straight to Hell (2007)
- Kathy Griffin: She'll Cut a Bitch (2009)
- Kathy Griffin: Balls of Steel (2009)
- Kathy Griffin: Does the Bible Belt (2010)
- Kathy Griffin: Whores on Crutches (2010)
- Kathy Griffin: 50 and Not Pregnant (2011)
- Kathy Griffin: Gurrl Down! (2011)
- Kathy Griffin: Pants Off (2011)
- Kathy Griffin: Tired Hooker (2011)
- Kathy Griffin: Seaman 1st Class (2012)
- Kathy Griffin: Kennedie Center On-Hers (2013)
- Kathy Griffin: Calm Down Gurrl (2013)
- Kathy Griffin: Record Breaker (2013)
- Kathy Griffin: A Hell of a Story (2019)
- Kathy Griffin: My Life on the PTSD List (2025)

== Discography ==
On June 10, 2008, Griffin released a comedy CD titled For Your Consideration. The disc was recorded at the ETK Theatre at the Grand Theatre Center For The Arts in Tracy, California on February 17, 2008. Griffin stated she decided to release the CD to try to win a Grammy award.

On August 25, 2009, Griffin released a second comedy album, Suckin' It for the Holidays, in another bid for a Grammy.

Griffin received her third Grammy nomination for Kathy Griffin: Does the Bible Belt in 2010,.

On May 4, 2012, the full length version of "I'll Say It", the theme song of her show Kathy, was released to iTunes as a single. On August 20, 2012, Griffin released a seven-track EP containing dance remixes of "I'll Say It".

Her fourth and fifth albums are 50 and Not Pregnant (2011) and Seaman 1st Class (2012) respectively.

Calm Down Gurrl (2013), her sixth album, won the Grammy for Best Comedy Album at the 56th Grammy Awards.

Look at My Butt Crack is her seventh album, it was recorded in Las Vegas and released in 2014.

== Bibliography ==
- Official Book Club Selection: A Memoir According to Kathy Griffin. Ballantine Books. 2009. ISBN 978-0345518569.
- Kathy Griffin's Celebrity Run-Ins: My A-Z Index. Flatiron Books. 2016. ISBN 978-1250115638.

== Awards and nominations ==
Primetime Emmy Awards
Emmy Awards source:

Year	Nominee / work	Award	Result
2006	Kathy Griffin: My Life on the D-List	Outstanding Reality Program	Nominated
2007	Kathy Griffin: My Life on the D-List	Outstanding Reality Program	Won
2008	Kathy Griffin: My Life on the D-List	Outstanding Reality Program	Won
2008	Kathy Griffin: Straight to Hell	Outstanding Variety, Music, or Comedy Special	Nominated
2009	Kathy Griffin: She'll Cut a Bitch	Outstanding Variety, Music, or Comedy Special	Nominated
2009	Kathy Griffin: My Life on the D-List	Outstanding Reality Program	Nominated
2010	Kathy Griffin: My Life on the D-List	Outstanding Reality Program	Nominated
2011	Kathy Griffin: My Life on the D-List	Outstanding Reality Program	Nominated
2012	Kathy Griffin: Tired Hooker	Outstanding Variety, Music, or Comedy Special	Nominated

Grammy Awards
Grammy Awards source:

Year	Nominee / work	Award	Result
2008	For Your Consideration	Best Comedy Album	Nominated
2009	Suckin' It for the Holidays	Best Comedy Album	Nominated
2010	Kathy Griffin Does the Bible Belt	Best Comedy Album	Nominated
2011	Kathy Griffin: 50 and Not Pregnant	Best Comedy Album	Nominated
2012	Kathy Griffin: Seaman 1st Class	Best Comedy Album	Nominated
2013	Calm Down Gurrl	Best Comedy Album	Won

GLAAD Media Awards

Year	Nominee / work	Award	Result
2009	Kathy Griffin	Vanguard Award	Won

PGA Awards

Year	Nominee / work	Award	Result
2008	Kathy Griffin: My Life on the D-List	Television Producer of the Year Award in Non-Fiction Television	Nominated
2009	Kathy Griffin: My Life on the D-List	Television Producer of the Year Award in Non-Fiction Television	Nominated
2010	Kathy Griffin: My Life on the D-List	Television Producer of the Year Award in Non-Fiction Television	Nominated

Gracie Awards

Year	Nominee / work	Award	Result
2009	Kathy Griffin: My Life on the D-List	Outstanding Female Lead – Comedy Series	Won

Other

Year	Nominee / work	Award	Result
2025	Herself	Advocate of the Year from the magazine The Advocate	Won
