= I'll Say It =

Single by Kathy Griffin
- Released: May 4, 2012
- Genre: Comedy
- Length: 2:11
- Label: Donut Run, Inc.
- Songwriter(s): Adam Schlesinger
- Producer(s): Butch Walker

Music video
- "I'll Say It" on YouTube

"I'll Say It" is a song written by American musician Adam Schlesinger and recorded by comedian Kathy Griffin, released as the theme song for her show, Kathy. It was additionally used, as the introduction music to her 2012 comedy special "Kennedie Center on Hers", and continued to be used in future specials. On August 20, 2012, Griffin released a seven track EP containing dance remixes of "I'll Say It".

== Music video ==
The music video begins in the day with Kathy Griffin in her house preparing her make-up. It shows her daily routine visiting her dogs, leaving the house and driving to a theater, ending with her on stage in her signature pose. The scenes are interlaced with various clips of Los Angeles, California.

== Charts ==
Chart (2012)	Peak position
US Dance Club Songs (Billboard)	22
