= Everybody Can Suck It =

Video by Kathy Griffin
- Released: 2007
- Recorded: June 5, 2007
- Genre: Comedy
- Length: 45:01
- Producer: Kathy Griffin

Kathy Griffin chronology
Strong Black Woman (2006)	Everybody Can Suck It (2007)	Straight to Hell (2007)

Everybody Can Suck It is the fifth stand-up comedy special by stand-up comedian Kathy Griffin on Bravo and her seventh overall. It was televised live from the Wells Fargo Center for the Arts in Santa Rosa, California on June 5, 2007, on Bravo.

== Track listing ==
No.	Title	Length
1.	"Introduction"	2:00
2.	"Mel Gibson's arrest"	2:00
3.	"Lindsay Lohan"	9:00
4.	"Club Hyde and Mary-Kate Olsen"	9:00
5.	"Whitney Houston"	3:00
6.	"Rosie O'Donnell's R Family cruise"	9:00
7.	"The Creative Arts Emmys"	5:00
8.	"Ann Coulter"	6:01
Total length:		45:01

== Personnel ==
Technical and production

- Cori Abraham - executive producer
- Frances Berwick - executive producer
- Tom Bull - supervising producer
- Scott Butler - producer
- Sandy Chanley - executive producer
- Kathy Griffin - executive producer
- Mark Hansson - line producer
- Amy Introcaso - executive producer (as Amy Introcaso-Davis)
- Keith Truesdell - producer
- Brent Carpenter - film editor
- Grady Cooper - film editor
- Joshua Harman - film editor
- Mark Hoffman - production design
- Larry Reed - sound mixer
- Rick Granville - assistant: Sandy Chanley
- Mark Hansson - associate director

Visuals and imagery

- Adam Christopher - hair stylist / makeup artist
- Zachary Boggs - camera operator: aerial cinematography
- Simon Miles - lighting designer
- Joe Victoria - jib operator
- Judith Brewer Curtis - wardrobe stylist (as Judith Curtis)
