= For Your Consideration (Kathy Griffin album) =

Live album by Kathy Griffin
- Released: June 17, 2008
- Recorded: February 2008 at the Grand Theatre Center for the Arts in Tracy, California
- Genre: Comedy
- Length: 57:38
- Label: Music with a Twist, RED
- Producer: Kathy Griffin, Christian Stavros

Kathy Griffin chronology
| Straight to Hell (2007) | For Your Consideration (2008) | She'll Cut a Bitch (2009) |

Professional ratings
Review scores
| Source | Rating |
|---|---|
| Allmusic | 4.5/5 stars |

For Your Consideration is a 2008 comedy album recorded by American stand-up comedian Kathy Griffin. The album was recorded at the Grand Theatre Center for the Arts in Tracy, California on February 17, 2008. It is Griffin's first audio-only release of her stand-up material. Included on the disc are her takes on various celebrities and her personal life. Griffin stated that she decided to release this CD to try to win a Grammy Award. For Your Consideration received a Grammy nomination for Best Comedy Album, but lost to George Carlin's It's Bad for Ya.

== Promotion ==
In the Spring of 2008, a billboard for the album was placed on Sunset Blvd. Various print advertisements for bus stops, magazines and newspaper circulated from April 2008 to the release date of the album. The theme of the advertisements featured Griffin in a red carpetesque gown desperate for media attention (for which she is famously known). The album also gained its own episode on Griffin's reality show, titled "For Your (Grammy) Consideration".

== Commercial performance ==
The album debuted on the U.S. Billboard 200 at #85, making it the highest-ranked album by a female comedian since 1983, when Joan Rivers reached number 22 with What Becomes a Semi-Legend Most? . The album also debuted at #1 on Top Comedy Albums, making her the first female comedian to do so since the chart began in 2004.

== Track listing ==
| No. | Title | Length |
|---|---|---|
| 1. | "The Hot Ticket" | 2:43 |
| 2. | "The Survey: Gay? Straight?" | 0:43 |
| 3. | "The Clicker (For the Maggie Fans)" | 2:16 |
| 4. | "My First Rebanning (Hi Barbara Walters!)" | 2:50 |
| 5. | "Happy Sunday (More Maggie!)" | 3:47 |
| 6. | "Cover Me" | 4:08 |
| 7. | "Oprah Is a Deity (And I Think She Is Full of Shit)" | 2:35 |
| 8. | "Oprah's Favorite Things" | 6:19 |
| 9. | "The Osmonds Were Never Cool" | 6:39 |
| 10. | "Freaky Doll People (Demi? Oh Yeah!)" | 6:13 |
| 11. | "Straight Guys Wake Up!" | 4:47 |
| 12. | "Our New Daddy's Coming" | 4:16 |
| 13. | "Wizard of Woz" | 2:13 |
| 14. | "My Run-in With Spielberg" | 8:20 |
| Total length: | | 57:38 |

== Personnel ==
Adapted from AllMusic.

Production

- Kathy Griffin — Executive producer; performer
- Christian Stavros — Producer
- Louie Teran — Mastering
- Jacob Feinberg-Pyne — Engineer

Visuals and imagery

- David Bett — Art Direction
- Michelle Holme — Art Direction

== Chart positions ==
| Chart (2008) | Peak position |
|---|---|
| U.S. Billboard 200 | 85 |
| U.S. Top Comedy Albums | 1 |
| U.S. Top Independent Albums | 8 |

== Release history ==
| Region | Date | Catalog number |
|---|---|---|
| United States | June 17, 2008 | 728847 |
| Canada | June 17, 2008 | 88697288472 |

== For Your Consideration Tour ==
To further promote the album, Griffin embarked on an American tour titled "For Your Consideration Tour". The tour began in May 2008 in Hawaii and ended in December 2008 in Los Angeles.

=== Tour dates ===
| Date | City | Country | Venue |
North America
| May 24, 2008 | Honolulu | United States | Waikiki Shell |
| May 30, 2008 | Atlantic City | United States | Borgata Event Center |
| May 31, 2008 | Atlantic City | United States | Borgata Event Center |
| June 19, 2008 | Newark | United States | Prudential Hall |
| June 20, 2008 | Albany | United States | Palace Theatre |
| June 21, 2008 | Westbury | United States | Capital One Bank Theater at Westbury |
| July 11, 2008 | Saratoga | United States | Mountain Winery Amphitheatre |
| July 12, 2008 | Concord | United States | Sleep Train Pavilion |
| July 18, 2008 | Las Vegas | United States | Mandalay Bay Theatre |
| July 26, 2008 | Grand Prairie | United States | Nokia Theatre at Grand Prairie |
| August 8, 2008 | Toronto | Canada | Massey Hall |
| August 9, 2008 | Niagara Falls | United States | Seneca Niagara Events Center |
| August 10, 2008 | Canandaigua | United States | Finger Lakes Performing Arts Center |
| August 22, 2008 | Kansas City | United States | Starlight Theatre |
| August 23, 2008 | Indianapolis | United States | Murat Theatre |
| September 5, 2008 | Atlanta | United States | Fox Theatre |
| September 25, 2008 | Washington, D.C. | United States | DAR Constitution Hall |
| September 26, 2008 | Washington, D.C. | United States | DAR Constitution Hall |
| September 28, 2008 | Washington, D.C. | United States | DAR Constitution Hall |
| October 3, 2008 | Minneapolis | United States | Orpheum Theatre |
| October 4, 2008 | Iowa City | United States | Hancher Auditorium |
| October 15, 2008 | Chicago | United States | Chicago Theatre |
| October 16, 2008 | Chicago | United States | Chicago Theatre |
| October 18, 2008 | Detroit | United States | Fox Theatre |
| November 6, 2008 | Phoenix | United States | Dodge Theatre |
| November 7, 2008 | Phoenix | United States | Dodge Theatre |
| December 7, 2008 | Palm Desert | United States | McCallum Theatre |
| December 8, 2008 | Palm Desert | United States | McCallum Theatre |
| December 9, 2008 | Los Angeles | United States | Kodak Theatre |
| December 10, 2008 | Los Angeles | United States | Kodak Theatre |
| December 11, 2008 | Los Angeles | United States | Kodak Theatre |
| December 12, 2008 | Los Angeles | United States | Kodak Theatre |
