= Kennedie Center On-Hers =

- Genre: Stand-up comedy
- Written by: Kathy Griffin
- Directed by: Paul Miller
- Starring: Kathy Griffin

Production
- Production locations: State Theatre, Minneapolis
- Running time: 42:56

Original release
- Network: Bravo
- Release: January 3, 2013

Kennedie Center On-Hers is the sixteenth stand-up comedy special by stand-up comedian Kathy Griffin and eighteenth overall. It was taped at the State Theatre in Minneapolis, Minnesota on December 1, 2012, and aired on January 3, 2013, on Bravo. It was her first special to feature her song "I'll Say It".

== Track listing ==
No.	Title	Length
1.	"Introduction"	5:00
2.	"Celine Dion"	8:00
3.	"Lindsay Lohan's legal problems"	2:00
4.	"Liz and Dick and other Lifetime movies"	5:00
5.	"Cher and political ads"	5:00
6.	"Miley Cyrus and Rock the Vote"	2:00
7.	"Sexting Anderson Cooper"	3:00
8.	"Beyond Scared Straight"	5:00
9.	"The reunion special of The Real Housewives of New Jersey"	5:00
10.	"Josh Groban"	2:56
Total length:		42:56

== Personnel ==
Technical and production

- Kathy Griffin - executive producer
- Jenn Levy - executive producer
- Paul Miller - executive producer
- Kimber Rickabaugh - executive producer
- Jeff U'ren - film editor
- Bruce Ryan - production design
- Cisco Henson - executive in charge of production
- Lesley Maynard - production supervisor
- Gene Crowe - associate director, stage manager
- Josh Morton - dialogue editor
- David Crivelli - technical supervisor
- Gene Crowe - stage manager

Visuals and imagery

- Ashlee Mullen - makeup artist
- Charles Baker Strahan - hair stylist
- Alan Adelman - lighting designer
- Erica Courtney - earrings
