= Suckin' It for the Holidays =

Live album by Kathy Griffin
- Released: November 3, 2009
- Recorded: Borgata, Atlantic City, New Jersey
- Genre: Comedy
- Length: 56:00
- Label: Music with a Twist
- Producer: Donut Run Productions, Inc.

Kathy Griffin chronology
For Your Consideration (2008)	Suckin' It for the Holidays (2009)	Balls of Steel (2009)

Professional ratings
Review scores
Source	Rating
Allmusic	3.5/5 stars

Suckin' It for the Holidays is a comedy album by American stand-up comedian Kathy Griffin. It was recorded at Borgata Hotel in Atlantic City, New Jersey. It was released online shortly before the Grammy nominations cut-off, in her second attempt to win the award. Her first comedy album, For Your Consideration, received a Best Comedy Album nomination in 2008 but George Carlin posthumously won for It's Bad for Ya.

Despite its title, Suckin' It for the Holidays is not a holiday album, although Kwanzaa is mentioned briefly. Griffin addresses many of her favorite subjects, including the foibles of celebrities and people who appear on reality television.

== Track listing ==
No.	Title	Length
1.	"Happy Kwaanza"	5:10
2.	"Maggie the Gay Activist"	1:11
3.	"Sturdy Germans & Polacks"	4:34
4.	"Nervous Pills & Boxes of Wine"	3:41
5.	"Katie Couric (Again!!!)"	1:34
6.	"President Suze Orman"	1:16
7.	"I Met Gayle"	2:47
8.	"Maya Angelou Is Insufferable"	2:40
9.	"Justin Out-Blacks T.I."	5:25
10.	"Somebody Has to Blow Trump"	5:51
11.	"Kelly vs. Bethany"	6:56
12.	"A Dude Named Danielle"	9:14
13.	"Congratulations (Speidi)"	5:14
Total length:		56:00

== Chart performance ==
Though not as successful as her previous album, this one entered the Top Comedy Album at number four on its debut, making it another Top Ten album for Griffin on this chart.

Chart (2008)	Peak position
U.S. Top Comedy Albums	4

== Personnel ==
Technical and production

- Kathy Griffin - Executive producer; performer
- Christian Stavros
- Louie Tera
- Jacob Feinberg-Pyne

Visuals and imagery

- David Bett
- Michelle Holme
