= Kathy Griffin: My Life on the D-List =

- Genre: Reality television
- Starring: Kathy Griffin; Matt Moline; John Griffin; Maggie Griffin; Jessica Zajicek; Tiffany Rinehart; Tom Vize
- Country of origin: United States
- Original language: English
- No. of seasons: 6
- No. of episodes: 48 (list of episodes)

Production
- Executive producers: Bryan Scott; Danny Salles; Kathy Griffin; Lisa Tucker
- Camera setup: Multi-camera
- Running time: 46 minutes
- Production company: Picture This Television

Original release
- Network: Bravo
- Release: August 3, 2005 – August 3, 2010

Kathy Griffin: My Life on the D-List is an American reality television series that aired on Bravo from August 3, 2005, to August 3, 2010. The series follows the struggle of self-proclaimed "D-list" celebrity Kathy Griffin to climb the Hollywood ladder. This often includes scheming for publicity with staffers Jessica, Tiffany, and Tom. Her relationships with her parents and her now ex-husband were also featured.

The series received a Primetime Emmy Award nomination every season during its six-season run and won the award twice.

== Production ==
Griffin had titled her first Bravo comedy special The D-List, to imply that her pull as a bottom-feeder celebrity was so low, she didn't even make the "C-list." The special was so popular that the network later approached Griffin to film a reality series based on her celebrity-bashing comedy.

All six seasons of the program were nominated for the Primetime Emmy Award for Outstanding Reality Program, with seasons 2 and 3 winning in 2007 and 2008. Season 3 premiered with the highest ratings for the show, with approximately one million viewers. Season 4 was the first expanded season, with ten episodes. Season 5 premiered with almost one million viewers, making it Bravo's highest rated Monday original series telecast ever in all demographics, at the time. The premiere was also up double digits among adults 18–49 versus the Season 4 premiere. Production began on Season 6, shooting eight episodes of the new season in January 2010. It began airing June 15, 2010, preceded by a new comedy special that was taped in Knoxville. The sixth and final season premiered on June 15, 2010 and concluded on August 3, 2010.

The series has aired on the cable TV channel Arena in Australia, E! in the UK, and in Canada on The Comedy Network and the Toronto-based independent station Sun TV.

== Series overview ==
Season	Episodes	Originally released	
Season	Episodes	First released	Last released
1	6	August 3, 2005	September 7, 2005
2	6	June 6, 2006	July 18, 2006
3	7	June 5, 2007	July 24, 2007
4	10	June 12, 2008	August 14, 2008
5	10	June 8, 2009	August 10, 2009
6	8	June 15, 2010	August 3, 2010

== Home media ==
On March 16, 2007, Universal announced that Season 1 would be released on DVD on June 12, 2007, a week after the premiere of the third season. Special features include a Season 2 Sneak Peek and the special "Kathy Griffin Is... Not Nicole Kidman." On April 6, 2010, Target announced that it had partnered with cable channel Bravo to exclusively distribute its line of reality TV series on DVD, starting with Season 2, which was released on April 13, 2010, and includes webisodes as a special feature. Season 3 was released exclusively by Target in July 2010, as part of its partnership with Bravo. Bonus features include extended scenes, stand-up from Kathy, and video blogs from her assistants. Season 4 was also released exclusively at Target in October 2010. It includes all 10 episodes and unseen content.

In December 2018, Griffin announced that the series would be made available on iTunes in the coming months. However, as of May, 2023 that has not come to fruition. On April 22, 2024, it was announced the show was airing for free on Peacock.

== Awards and nominations ==
Year	Award	Category	For	Result	Notes
2006	Primetime Emmy Award	Outstanding Reality Program	Season 1	Nominated	
2007	Primetime Emmy Award	Outstanding Reality Program	Season 2	Won	
2008	Primetime Emmy Award	Outstanding Reality Program	Season 3	Won	
2008	19th GLAAD Media Awards	Best Reality Program	Season 3	Won	
2008	Producers Guild of America Awards	Best Non-Fiction Programming	Season 3	Nominated	
2009	Producers Guild of America Awards	Best Non-Fiction Programming	Season 4	Nominated	
2009	Primetime Emmy Award	Outstanding Reality Program	Season 4	Nominated	
2009	20th GLAAD Media Awards	Best Reality Program	Season 4	Nominated	
2009	Teen Choice Awards	Choice TV Show: Reality/Variety	Season 4	Nominated	
2010	Primetime Emmy Award	Outstanding Reality Program	Season 5	Nominated	
2010	21st GLAAD Media Awards	Best Reality Program	Season 5	Nominated	
2010	Hollywood Teen TV Awards	"Teen Pick Show: Reality Show "	Season 6	Nominated	
2011	Primetime Emmy Award	Outstanding Reality Program	Season 6	Nominated	
