= Record Breaker =

Video by Kathy Griffin
- Released: 2013
- Recorded: December 18, 2013
- Genre: Comedy
- Length: 42:55
- Producer: Kathy Griffin

Kathy Griffin chronology
Calm Down Gurrl (2013)	Record Breaker (2013)	Look at My Butt Crack (2014)

Record Breaker is the eighteenth stand-up comedy special by stand-up comedian Kathy Griffin on Bravo and her twentieth overall. It was televised live from the Majestic Theatre in San Antonio, Texas on December 18, 2013, on Bravo.

== Track listing ==
No.	Title	Length
1.	"Introduction"	1:00
2.	"Rick Perry"	2:00
3.	"The Daytime Emmy Awards"	9:00
4.	"Maggie Griffin on Miley Cyrus at the VMAs"	7:00
5.	"Griffin on a gay cruise"	12:00
6.	"Kirstie Alley's new reality show"	9
7.	"Fanmail from Griffin's prison pen pal"	2:55
Total length:		42:55

== Personnel ==
Technical and production

- Deborah Adamson - associate producer
- Kathy Griffin - executive producer
- Paul Miller - executive producer
- Kimber Rickabaugh - executive producer
- Jeff U'ren - film editor
- Bruce Ryan - production design
- Cisco Henson - executive in charge of production
- Lesley Maynard - associate director, stage manager
- David Crivelli - technical supervisor

Visuals and imagery

- Ashlee Mullen - makeup artist
- Charles Baker Strahan - hair stylist
- Alan Adelman - lighting designer
