= The D-List =

Video by Kathy Griffin
- Released: 2004
- Recorded: March 24, 2004
- Genre: Comedy
- Length: 44:56
- Producer: Kathy Griffin

Kathy Griffin chronology
Hot Cup of Talk (1998)	The D-List (2004)	Allegedly (2004)

The D-List is the first stand-up comedy special by stand-up comedian Kathy Griffin on Bravo and her third special overall. It was televised and recorded live from the Laugh Factory in Los Angeles, California on March 24, 2004, on Bravo.

== Track listing ==
No.	Title	Length
1.	"Introduction"	1:00
2.	"Britney Spears's wedding"	4:00
3.	"Whitney Houston at the Billboard Music Awards"	6:00
4.	"Anna Nicole Smith and Little Richard on Hollywood Squares"	14:00
5.	"AmfAR with Sharon Stone"	25:56
Total length:		44:56

== Personnel ==
Technical and production

- Tom Bull - supervising producer
- Scott Butler - producer
- Sandy Chanley - executive producer
- Keith Truesdell - producer
- Grady Cooper - film editor
- Stacy Brewster - production coordinator
- John Pritchett - technical director

Visuals and imagery

- Cynthia Bachman Brown - makeup department head
- Paul Michael - sound re-recording mixer
