= Hot Cup of Talk =

- Genre: Stand-up special
- Written by: Kathy Griffin
- Directed by: Keith Truesdell
- Starring: Kathy Griffin

Production
- Production locations: Variety Arts Theatre, Los Angeles
- Running time: 60 min
- Production company: Production Partners

Original release
- Network: HBO
- Release: August 14, 1998

Hot Cup of Talk is the second stand-up comedy special by stand-up comedian Kathy Griffin on HBO. It was televised live from the Variety Arts Theatre in Los Angeles, California on August 14, 1998, on HBO.

== Track listing ==
No.	Title	Length
1.	"Introduction"	3:00
2.	"Maggie Griffin"	5:00
3.	"Madonna's British accent"	3:00
4.	"VH1's Divas Live"	8:00
5.	"The new way to say "cunt""	5:00
6.	"Encounter with President Bill Clinton"	9:20
7.	"Hanson"	8:00
Total length:		41:20

== Personnel ==
Technical and production

- Scott Butler - associate producer
- Sandy Chanley - producer
- Michael D. Jones - production manager
- Brian Hall - production coordinator
- Doug Ramsey - technical director

Visuals and imagery

- Marc Lamphear - film editor
- Alex Fuller - art director
