= Hardcore TV =

Hardcore TV may refer to:

- ECW Hardcore TV, a weekly professional wrestling television program.
- Hardcore TV, a 1992 HBO series.
