= List of HBO original programming =

HBO is an American pay television service owned and operated by Skydance. Below is a list of programs that currently, formerly, or soon-to-be broadcast on the network.

== Current programming ==
=== Drama ===
Title	Genre	Premiere	Seasons	Runtime	Status
True Detective	Crime drama anthology	January 12, 2014	4 seasons, 30 episodes	54–87 min	Season 5 due to premiere in 2027
Big Little Lies	Psychological drama	February 19, 2017	2 seasons, 14 episodes	45–58 min	Renewed
The White Lotus	Tragicomedy anthology	July 11, 2021	3 seasons, 21 episodes	54–87 min	Season 4 due to premiere in 2027
The Gilded Age	Historical drama	January 24, 2022	4 seasons, 33 episodes	46–80 min	Season 4 ongoing Renewed
House of the Dragon	Fantasy	August 21, 2022	3 seasons, 26 episodes	53–67 min	Renewed for final season
The Last of Us	Post-apocalyptic drama	January 15, 2023	2 seasons, 16 episodes	43–80 min	Season 3 due to premiere in 2027
Dune: Prophecy	Science fiction	November 17, 2024	1 season, 6 episodes	59–82 min	Season 2 due to premiere in 2026
Task	Crime drama	September 7, 2025	1 season, 7 episodes	58–65 min	Renewed
It: Welcome to Derry	Supernatural horror	October 26, 2025	1 season, 9 episodes	29–69 min	Renewed
A Knight of the Seven Kingdoms	Fantasy	January 18, 2026	1 season, 6 episodes	30–42 min	Season 2 due to premiere in 2027
Lanterns	Science fiction superhero crime drama	August 16, 2026	1 season, 8 episodes	48–57 min	Pending
Awaiting release
Harry Potter	Fantasy drama	December 25, 2026	1 season, 8 episodes	TBA	Renewed

=== Comedy ===
Title	Genre	Premiere	Seasons	Runtime	Status
Girls	Comedy drama	April 15, 2012	6 seasons, 62 episodes	26–41 min	Renewed
It's Florida, Man	Comedy anthology	October 18, 2024	2 seasons, 12 episodes	23–25 min	Season 3 due to premiere on December 4, 2026
The Chair Company	Comedy thriller	October 12, 2025	1 season, 8 episodes	26–36 min	Renewed
I Love LA	Comedy	November 2, 2025	1 season, 8 episodes	29–35 min	Season 2 due to premiere in 2027
Rooster	Comedy drama	March 8, 2026	1 season, 10 episodes	30–34 min	Season 2 due to premiere in 2027
Youth	Comedy	September 20, 2026	1 season, 8 episodes	27–29 min	Renewed

=== Unscripted ===
==== Docuseries ====
Title	Subject	Premiere	Seasons	Runtime	Status
Hard Knocks	Sports	August 1, 2001	27 seasons, 157 episodes	29–56 min	Renewed
100 Foot Wave	Sports	July 18, 2021	3 seasons, 17 episodes	52–60 min	Renewed
Neighbors	Interpersonal conflict	February 13, 2026	1 season, 6 episodes	30–37 min	Renewed
Awaiting release
My Favorite Murder	Podcasting/True crime	December 3, 2026	4 episodes	TBA	Miniseries

==== Variety ====
Title	Genre	Premiere	Seasons	Runtime	Status
Real Time with Bill Maher	Talk show	February 21, 2003	24 seasons, 750 episodes	52–58 min	Renewed through 2028
Last Week Tonight with John Oliver	Late-night talk show	April 27, 2014	13 seasons, 380 episodes	30–45 min	Renewed

=== Co-productions ===
Title	Genre	Partner/Country	Premiere	Seasons	Runtime	Language	Status
Industry	Drama	BBC Two/United Kingdom	November 9, 2020	4 seasons, 32 episodes	48–60 min	English	Renewed for final season
C.B. Strike (seasons 3–4) (Note: Seasons 1–2 (UK series 1–4) originally aired on Cinemax.)	Crime drama	BBC One/United Kingdom	February 6, 2023	2 seasons, 8 episodes	59–60 min	English	Season 5 due to premiere on December 7, 2026
War	Legal thriller anthology	Sky Atlantic/United Kingdom	October 1, 2026	1 season, 8 episodes	45–54 min	English	Renewed

=== Continuations ===
Title	Genre	Prev. network(s)	Premiere	Seasons	Length	Language	Status
Conan O'Brien Must Go (season 3)	Travel docuseries	HBO Max	August 21, 2026	1 season, 4 episodes	40–46 min	English	Pending

== Upcoming programming ==
=== Drama ===
Title	Genre	Premiere	Seasons	Runtime	Status
The Trial of Louise Woodward	True crime drama miniseries	2027	5 episodes	TBA	Filming
The Chain	Thriller miniseries	TBA	8 episodes	TBA	Series order
Crazy Rich Asians	Romantic drama	TBA	TBA	TBA	Series order
The Spread	Drama	TBA	TBA	TBA	Series order

=== Animation ===
Title	Genre	Premiere	Seasons	Runtime	Status
Merrick & Treves	Adult animated science fiction comedy	TBA	2 seasons	30 min	Pending

=== Co-productions ===
Title	Genre	Partner/Country	Premiere	Seasons	Runtime	Language	Status
First Day on Earth	Drama	BBC One/United Kingdom	TBA	1 season, 10 episodes	TBA	English	Filming
1536	Historical drama	BBC One/United Kingdom	TBA	1 season, 8 episodes	TBA	English	Series order

=== Unscripted ===
==== Docuseries ====
Title	Subject	Premiere	Episodes	Runtime	Status
Not a Very Good Murder	True crime	TBA	TBA	TBA	In production
Oobah: Scams for a Better Tomorrow	Docu-comedy	TBA	TBA	TBA	In production
The Palladino Files	True crime	TBA	TBA	TBA	In production
Untitled Keiko docuseries	Wildlife	TBA	TBA	TBA	In production
Untitled Zizians docuseries	Cults/True crime	TBA	TBA	TBA	In production

=== In development ===
==== Drama ====
- 10,000 Ships
- Advantage Player
- All That Glitters
- Angel Heart
- The Applebaum Curse
- Baldur's Gate
- The Birds
- Blackout Room
- Damage
- Dark Places
- Dorothea
- The Fort Bragg Cartel
- Further Lane
- Imposter
- The Patient
- Project: MKUltra
- The System
- Untitled Jonestown series
- Untitled Poison Ivy series
- V for Vendetta
- WitSec: Inside the Federal Witness Protection Program

==== Comedy ====
- Alan Opts Out
- Back
- The Band
- Call My Agent
- Flat Tyres
- Kansas City Star
- Lifties
- Open
- The Rush Whisperer
- Unentitled
- Untitled Bill Hader/Duffy Boudreau series
- Untitled Issa Rae series
- Untitled Molly Shannon/Steve Koren series

==== Animation ====
- Nine Voyages

== Former programming ==
The following is a list of HBO shows that have appeared on the channel in the past. Some of these shows may still be available on demand to HBO subscribers.

=== Drama ===
Title	First broadcast	Last broadcast	Season count	Notes
Philip Marlowe, Private Eye	1983	1986	2	
Maximum Security	1984	1985	1	
Oz	1997	2003	6	
The Sopranos	1999	2007	6	
Six Feet Under	2001	2005	5	
The Wire	2002	2008	5	
Carnivàle	2003	2005	2	
Deadwood	2004	2006	3	
Rome	2005	2007	2	Co-production with BBC Two and Rai 2
Big Love	2006	2011	5	
Five Days	2007	2010	2	Co-production with BBC One
John from Cincinnati	2007	2007	1	
Tell Me You Love Me	2007	2007	1	
In Treatment	2008	2021	4	
True Blood	2008	2014	7	
Boardwalk Empire	2010	2014	5	
Treme	2010	2013	4	
Game of Thrones	2011	2019	8	
Luck	2011	2012	1	
The Newsroom	2012	2014	3	
The Leftovers	2014	2017	3	
Vinyl	2016	2016	1	
Westworld	2016	2022	4	
The Deuce	2017	2019	3	
Here and Now	2018	2018	1	
Succession	2018	2023	4	
My Brilliant Friend	2018	2024	4	Co-production with Rai 1 and TIMvision
Gentleman Jack	2019	2022	2	Co-production with BBC One
Euphoria	2019	2026	3	
His Dark Materials	2019	2022	3	Co-production with BBC One
The Outsider	2020	2020	1	
Perry Mason	2020	2023	2	
Lovecraft Country	2020	2020	1	
The Nevers	2021	2021	1	
Winning Time: The Rise of the Lakers Dynasty	2022	2023	2	
The Time Traveler's Wife	2022	2022	1	
The Idol	2023	2023	1	

=== Comedy ===
Title	First broadcast	Last broadcast	Season count	Notes
Not Necessarily the News	1983	1990	8	
1st & Ten	1984	1991	6	
Encyclopedia Brown	1989	1990	1	
The Kids in the Hall	1989	1995	6	Co-production with CBC Television
The Baby-Sitters Club	1990	1990	1	
Dream On	1990	1996	6	
Hardcore TV	1992	1994	1	
The Larry Sanders Show	1992	1998	6	
Mr. Show with Bob and David	1995	1998	4	
Arliss	1996	2002	7	
The High Life	1996	1996	1	
Tracey Takes On...	1996	1999	4	
Tenacious D	1997	2000	3	
Sex and the City	1998	2004	6	
Curb Your Enthusiasm	2000	2024	12	
The Mind of the Married Man	2001	2002	2	
Da Ali G Show	2003 (Note: Moved from Channel 4)	2004	3	
K Street	2003	2003	1	
Entourage	2004	2011	8	
The Comeback	2005	2026	3	
Extras	2005	2007	2	Co-production with BBC Two
Unscripted	2005	2005	1	
Lucky Louie	2006	2006	1	
Flight of the Conchords	2007	2009	2	
Little Britain USA	2008	2008	1	
Bored to Death	2009	2011	3	
Eastbound & Down	2009	2013	4	
Hung	2009	2011	3	
The No. 1 Ladies' Detective Agency	2009	2009	1	Co-production with BBC One
Funny or Die Presents	2010	2011	2	
How to Make It in America	2010	2011	2	
The Neistat Brothers	2010	2010	1	
Enlightened	2011	2013	2	
The Boring Life of Jacqueline	2012	2012	1	
Life's Too Short	2012	2013	1	Co-production with BBC Two
Veep	2012	2019	7	
Family Tree	2013	2013	1	Co-production with BBC Two
Getting On	2013	2015	3	
Hello Ladies	2013	2014	1	
Doll & Em	2014	2015	2	Co-production with Sky Living
Looking	2014	2016	2	
Silicon Valley	2014	2019	6	
Ballers	2015	2019	5	
The Brink	2015	2015	1	
Togetherness	2015	2016	2	
Divorce	2016	2019	3	
High Maintenance	2016	2020	4	
Insecure	2016	2021	5	
Vice Principals	2016	2017	2	
Crashing	2017	2019	3	
Barry	2018	2023	4	
Camping	2018	2018	1	
Random Acts of Flyness	2018	2022	2	
Sally4Ever	2018	2018	1	Co-production with Sky Atlantic
Los Espookys	2019	2022	2	
A Black Lady Sketch Show	2019	2023	4	
The Righteous Gemstones	2019	2025	4	
Avenue 5	2020	2022	2	Co-production with Sky One (season 1) and Sky Comedy (season 2)
Betty	2020	2021	2	
Run	2020	2020	1	
Somebody Somewhere	2022	2024	3	
The Rehearsal	2022	2025	2	
Rain Dogs	2023	2023	1	Co-production with BBC One
Fantasmas	2024	2024	1	
The Franchise	2024	2024	1	

=== Miniseries ===
Title	Year aired	Notes
The Seekers	1979	
All the Rivers Run	1984	Co-production with Seven Network
The Far Pavilions	1984	
Glory Years	1987	
Tanner '88	1988	
Sessions	1991	
Laurel Avenue	1993	
From the Earth to the Moon	1998	
The Corner	2000	
Band of Brothers	2001	
Angels in America	2003	
Elizabeth I	2005	Co-production with Channel 4
Empire Falls	2005	
Tsunami: The Aftermath	2006	Co-production with BBC Two
Summer Heights High	2007	Produced by Princess Pictures for ABC; branded as an HBO Original for North American distribution
Generation Kill	2008	
House of Saddam	2008	Co-production with BBC Two
John Adams	2008	
The Passion	2008	Co-production with BBC
The Pacific	2010	
Angry Boys	2011	Co-production with Australian Broadcasting Corporation
Mildred Pierce	2011	
Ja'mie: Private School Girl	2013	Co-production with Australian Broadcasting Corporation
Parade's End	2013	Co-production with BBC Two and VRT
Jonah from Tonga	2014	Co-production with Australian Broadcasting Corporation
Olive Kitteridge	2014	
The Casual Vacancy	2015	Co-production with BBC One
Show Me a Hero	2015	
The Night Of	2016	
Gunpowder	2017	Produced by Kudos for BBC One; branded as an HBO Original for North American distribution
The Young Pope	2017	Co-production with Sky Atlantic and Canal+
Mosaic	2018	
Sharp Objects	2018	
Catherine the Great	2019	Co-production with Sky Atlantic
Chernobyl	2019	Co-production with Sky Atlantic
Mrs. Fletcher	2019	
Our Boys	2019	Co-production with Keshet Studios
Watchmen	2019	
Years and Years	2019	Co-production with BBC One
I Know This Much Is True	2020	
I May Destroy You	2020	Co-production with BBC One
The New Pope	2020	Co-production with Sky Atlantic and Canal+
The Plot Against America	2020	
The Third Day	2020	Co-production with Sky Atlantic
The Undoing	2020	
We Are Who We Are	2020	Co-production with Sky Atlantic
The Investigation	2021	Produced by TV 2; branded as an HBO Original for North American distribution
Beartown	2021	Produced by HBO Europe; branded as an HBO Original for North American distribution
Laetitia	2021	Produced by France Télévisions; branded as an HBO Original for North American distribution
Landscapers	2021	Co-production with Sky Atlantic
Mare of Easttown	2021	
Scenes from a Marriage	2021	
The Baby	2022	Co-production with Sky Atlantic
Irma Vep	2022	
We Own This City	2022	
White House Plumbers	2023	
Get Millie Black	2024	Co-production with Channel 4
The Penguin	2024	
The Regime	2024	
The Sympathizer	2024	
DTF St. Louis	2026	
Half Man	2026	Co-production with BBC One
Life, Larry and the Pursuit of Unhappiness	2026	

=== Anthology ===
Title	First broadcast	Last broadcast	Season count	Notes
The Hitchhiker	1983	1987 (Note: Moved to USA Network)	4	Co-production with First Choice
The Ray Bradbury Theater	1985	1986	1	
Tales from the Crypt	1989	1996	7	
Lifestories: Families in Crisis	1992	1996	2	
Hotel Room	1993	1993	1	
Perversions of Science	1997	1997	1	
Room 104	2017	2020	4	

=== Animation ===
==== Adult animation ====
Title	First broadcast	Last broadcast	Season count	Notes
Spicy City	1997	1997	1	
Todd McFarlane's Spawn	1997	1999	3	
The Life & Times of Tim	2008	2012	3	
The Ricky Gervais Show	2010	2012	3	Co-production with Channel 4
Animals	2016	2018	3	

==== Kids & family ====
Title	First broadcast	Last broadcast	Season count	Notes
Fraggle Rock	1983	1987	5	Co-production with TVS and CBC
HBO Storybook Musicals	1987	1993	1	
Seabert	1987	1989	1	Co-production with France 2
The Legend of White Fang	1994	1994	1	Co-production with TF1
Happily Ever After: Fairy Tales for Every Child	1995	2000	3	
The Little Lulu Show	1995	1999	3	Co-production with Family Channel
The Neverending Story	1995	1996	1	
The Adventures of Paddington Bear	1997	2000	3	
The Country Mouse and the City Mouse Adventures	1998	1999	2	Co-production with France 3
A Little Curious	1999	2000	2	
Crashbox	1999	2000	2	
30 by 30: Kid Flicks	1999	2001	4	
Anthony Ant	1999	1999	1	Co-production with YTV
George and Martha	1999	2000	2	Co-production with YTV
Rainbow Fish	2000	2000	1	Co-production with Teletoon
Animated Tales of the World	2001	2006	3	Co-production with Channel 4
Harold and the Purple Crayon	2001	2002	1	
Tales from the Neverending Story	2001	2002	1	
I Spy	2002	2003	2	
Stuart Little	2003	2003	1	
Classical Baby	2005	2008	1	
Sesame Street	2016	2020 (Note: Moved to HBO Max)		Co-production with PBS Kids
Esme & Roy	2018	2019	1	Co-production with Treehouse TV

=== Unscripted ===
==== Docuseries ====
Title	First broadcast	Last broadcast
Time Was...	1979	1980
Beautiful, Baby, Beautiful	1980	1981
Yesteryear	1982	1982
America Undercover	1983	2006
Real Sex	1992	2009
Autopsy	1994	2008
Taxicab Confessions	1995	2006
G String Divas	2000	2000
Freshman Year	2001	2001
Kindergarten	2001	2001
Project Greenlight	2001	2015
Cathouse: The Series	2004	2008
Family Bonds	2004	2004
Pornucopia	2004	2004
Dane Cook's Tourgasm	2006	2006
Masterclass	2010	2014
On Freddie Roach	2012	2012
Vice	2013	2018 (Note: Moved to Showtime)
Foo Fighters: Sonic Highways	2014	2014
The Jinx	2015	2024
The Defiant Ones	2017	2017
Axios	2018	2021
Wyatt Cenac's Problem Areas	2018	2019
On Tour with Asperger's Are Us	2019	2019
The Case Against Adnan Syed	2019	2025
Atlanta's Missing and Murdered: The Lost Children	2020	2020
The Cost of Winning	2020	2020
How To with John Wilson	2020	2023
I'll Be Gone in the Dark	2020	2020
McMillions	2020	2020
Murder on Middle Beach	2020	2020
Seeing America With Megan Rapinoe	2020	2020
The Vow	2020	2022
Allen v. Farrow	2021	2021
Black and Missing	2021	2021
Catch and Kill: The Podcast Tapes	2021	2021
Exterminate All the Brutes	2021	2021
The Lady and the Dale	2021	2021
Level Playing Field	2021	2021
NYC Epicenters 9/11→2021½	2021	2021
Nuclear Family	2021	2021
Painting with John	2021	2023
Pray, Obey, Kill	2021	2021
Q: Into the Storm	2021	2021
Small Town News: KPVM Pahrump	2021	2021
The Anarchists	2022	2022
Edge of the Earth	2022	2022
Mind Over Murder	2022	2022
Phoenix Rising	2022	2022
Hostages	2022	2022
Shaq	2022	2022
Unveiled: Surviving La Luz del Mundo	2022	2022
Branson	2022	2022
Sex Diaries	2022	2022
Angel City	2023	2023
Burden of Proof	2023	2023
Last Call: When a Serial Killer Stalked Queer New York	2023	2023
The Golden Boy	2023	2023
Telemarketers	2023	2023
Savior Complex	2023	2023
Navajo Police: Class 57	2023	2023
Love Has Won: The Cult of Mother God	2023	2023
Murder in Boston: Roots, Rampage, and Reckoning	2023	2023
God Save Texas	2024	2024
The Synanon Fix: Did the Cure Become a Cult?	2024	2024
Stax: Soulsville U.S.A.	2024	2024
Ren Faire	2024	2024
One South: Portrait of a Psych Unit	2024	2024
Charlie Hustle & the Matter of Pete Rose	2024	2024
Chimp Crazy	2024	2024
Wise Guy: David Chase and the Sopranos	2024	2024
I'm Not a Monster: The Lois Riess Murders	2024	2024
Breath of Fire	2024	2024
An Update on Our Family	2025	2025
Eyes on the Prize III: We Who Believe in Freedom Cannot Rest	2025	2025
Celtics City	2025	2025
The Dark Money Game	2025	2025
Pee-wee as Himself	2025	2025
The Mortician	2025	2025
Billy Joel: And So It Goes	2025	2025
The Yogurt Shop Murders	2025	2026
Seen & Heard: The History of Black Television	2025	2025
Alex vs ARod	2025	2025
Mel Brooks: The 99 Year Old Man!	2026	2026
Murder in Glitterball City	2026	2026
Born to Bowl	2026	2026
The Dark Wizard	2026	2026
U.S. Against the World: Four Years with the Men's National Soccer Team	2026	2026
Bring Me the Beauties: A Model Cult	2026	2026
The Man Will Burn	2026	2026
Monsters of God	2026	2026
A Killer Story	2026	2026
Jay-Z in 8	2026	2026
The Pet Cemetery Murders: A Ghost Story	2026	2026

==== Reality ====
Title	First broadcast	Last broadcast
We're Here	2020	2024
Chillin Island	2021	2022
Jerrod Carmichael Reality Show	2024	2024

==== Variety ====
Title	First broadcast	Last broadcast
Martha's Attic	1974	1976
On Location	1976	1985
Standing Room Only	1976	1982
Backstage in Hollywood	1979	1980
Video Jukebox	1981	1986
Braingames	1983	1985
Encyclopedia	1988	1989
One Night Stand	1989	2005
Def Comedy Jam	1992	2008
Dennis Miller Live	1994	2002
HBO Comedy Half-Hour	1994	1999
The Chris Rock Show	1997	2000
Reverb	1997	2001
Def Poetry Jam	2002	2007
Down and Dirty with Jim Norton	2008	2008
Joe Buck Live	2009	2009
After the Thrones	2016	2016
Any Given Wednesday with Bill Simmons	2016	2016
Vice News Tonight	2016	2019 (Note: Moved to Vice on TV)
The Shop: Uninterrupted	2018	2021 (Note: Moved to YouTube)
PAUSE with Sam Jay	2021	2022
The House That Dragons Built	2022	2022

==== Sports ====
Title	First broadcast	Last broadcast
HBO World Championship Boxing	1973	2018
Wimbledon Tennis	1975	1999
Inside the NFL	1977	2008
Race for the Pennant	1978	1992
Real Sports with Bryant Gumbel	1995	2023
Boxing After Dark	1996	2018
KO Nation	2000	2001
On the Record with Bob Costas	2001	2004
Costas Now	2005	2009
Back on the Record with Bob Costas	2021	2022
Game Theory with Bomani Jones	2022	2023

== See also ==
- List of HBO Asia original programming
- List of HBO Canada original programming
- List of HBO Europe original programming
- List of HBO Latin America original programming
