= HBO Sports Bowling =

HBO premium network

HBO Sports Bowling is the branding used for Professional Bowlers Association broadcasts on the HBO premium cable and satellite television network. Bowling was one of HBO's earliest programs, back when it debuted in the early 1970s. HBO's first bowling telecast was the Winston-Salem Open on June 10, 1973. About 21 PBA TV finals aired on HBO from June 1973 through July 1975.

Dick Stockton, Marty Glickman, and Spencer Ross served as the play-by-play announcers and Skee Foremsky acted as the color commentator for the bowling telecasts.

== See also ==
- List of programs broadcast by HBO
  - HBO § Sports programming
- PBA Tour § PBA Tour in the media
