= Time Was =

- Opening title for HBO's Time Was
- Starring: Dick Cavett
- Country of origin: United States
- No. of episodes: 7

Production
- Running time: 60 minutes

Original release
- Network: HBO
- Release: 1979

Time Was is a documentary television series that premiered on HBO on November 11, 1979. It was hosted by Dick Cavett with each program looking at one decade from the past starting from the 1920s up to the 1970s.

== Summary ==
The historical program looked at the lifestyles and society during the various periods of time via archival footage. The series was followed up with two other HBO documentary series hosted by Cavett, Remember When, which premiered in May 1981 and Yesteryear, which premiered in July 1982.

== See also ==
- List of programs broadcast by HBO
- 1979 in television
