= Race for the Pennant =

Sports show focused on Major League Baseball

- Country of origin: United States

Original release
- Network: Home Box Office (HBO)
- Release: 1978 – 1992

Race for the Pennant is a weekly sports show focused on Major League Baseball; it premiered on Home Box Office (HBO) in 1978. It is hosted by Len Berman, Tim McCarver, Barry Tompkins, Bob Gibson, Maury Wills and others. The series ended in 1992.

== See also ==
- List of programs broadcast by HBO
