= HBO Sundays =

American television programming block

- Network: HBO
- Launched: March 15, 1998
- Country of origin: United States
- Format: TV programming block
- Running time: Varies (generally 2 1/2 hours)
- Original language: American English

HBO Sundays is a primetime block of television programming that has been airing on the pay-cable network HBO since March 15, 1998. HBO has traditionally used their lineup to launch critically acclaimed, boundary-pushing, prestigious original series in a variety of genres, including drama, comedy, and late-night variety. HBO's Sunday night lineup has been home to The Sopranos, Sex and the City, Curb Your Enthusiasm, Six Feet Under, The Wire, Game of Thrones, Girls, Veep, Succession, and The White Lotus. HBO president Casey Bloys referred to Sundays as "our flagship night for flagship shows."

== Format ==
HBO typically airs original programming on Sundays from 9pm to 11:30pm throughout the year, with occasionally programming being placed in the 8pm hour in rare instances. Most of the shows broadcast in this slot have been one-hour dramas and half-hour comedies, although documentary series and limited series have become more common in recent years. The traditional HBO Sunday night lineup consists of a one-hour drama series at 9pm, followed by two half-hour narrative comedies at 10 and 10:30pm, and since 2014, the late night show Last Week Tonight with John Oliver closing out the night in the 11pm timeslot, though in recent years, HBO has been producing fewer comedies for Sunday nights and opting to air documentary series in the 10pm hour some of the time.

== History ==
=== Beginnings ===
In 1998, HBO executives moved their critically-acclaimed series The Larry Sanders Show from Wednesdays to Sundays for its sixth and final season and paired it with From the Earth to the Moon, the Tom Hanks-produced prestige docudrama about the Apollo program. HBO executives selected Sunday nights in a strategy meant to counteract the traditional broadcast networks, who typically neglected programming the weekends with high-tier series and opted to air these shows during the week instead. HBO head of programming Michael Lombardo said, "Sunday was a wasteland. Broadcast networks didn't do anything on Sunday night. Football wasn't quite the thing it is. And so it was counterprogramming: 'Let's see if we can make Sunday night our place.'"

That summer, HBO launched Sex and the City on Sunday nights. It would become one of the network's flagship shows and define HBO's Sunday block, alongside fellow ratings juggernaut The Sopranos, which began airing the following year. The Sopranos became a huge hit with audiences, critics, and awards voters, despite all the major television networks having passed on it. The lineup became so popular in the early 2000s that HBO began using the marketing slogan "Sunday is... HBO." "Ever since The Sopranos, it's owned the day," said The Ringer. Off the backs of these two shows, HBO began seriously competing with the broadcast networks for awards, earning the most Emmys of any network in 1999 for the first time. Buoyed by the success of Sex and the City and The Sopranos, HBO began ordering more original series to fill out its Sunday night lineup throughout the year. Choosing to air a show on Sunday night became HBO's way of indicating to critics and audiences that the show was "a big deal."

The following years saw HBO debuting new shows like critical darling Six Feet Under, miniseries Band of Brothers, and Larry David's Seinfeld follow-up Curb Your Enthusiasm, which aired on and off on the network for 24 years.

"Sundays are obviously a defining element of our brand," HBO and HBO Max executive vice president Zach Enterlin was quoted as saying. "You know you'll have something great on Sunday nights. It's part of our DNA."

Paul Rudd's character referenced HBO's Sunday night programming in the 2009 film I Love You, Man, saying "You ever watched Sunday night programming on HBO? It's spectacular."

Competitors Showtime, AMC, and Starz followed HBO's lead and began airing their own blocks of originals on Sunday nights.

=== Peak popularity ===
In 2011, HBO launched Game of Thrones, a new prestige fantasy series based on George R. R. Martin's novels A Song of Ice and Fire. By 2014, the show had topped The Sopranos as HBO's most-watched series of all-time, averaging 18.4 million viewers per episode.

In 2013, HBO poached John Oliver from Comedy Central, after the comedian's critically-acclaimed run guest hosting The Daily Show, and signed him to host his own late night show. This resulted in Last Week Tonight with John Oliver, which debuted the following year, and added a traditional late night show to HBO's Sunday night lineup for the first time. The show, which has been on the air for eleven years and counting, is HBO's longest-running Sunday night series behind Curb Your Enthusiasm.

Referring to HBO's 2014–2016 Sunday night programming, HBO executive Michael Lombardo said, "It just felt like the apotheosis of what you promised. You start off with something in the 9 o'clock spot that was dramatic and emotional, and then you had a smart but palate-cleansing two half-hours. And then what a great way to end the evening with John Oliver. When I think of a moment of scheduling perfection, that was probably it."

In 2019, after AT&T purchased HBO's parent company Time Warner, HBO expanded to 150 hours of original programming, a 50% increase over the year before. The network began expanding its original programming to a Monday night block, but they have struggled to create a night as popular as its Sundays.

In spring of 2023, HBO executives opted to air the finale of the hit show The Last of Us at 9pm on March 12, during the second hour of the 2023 Academy Awards, rather than relocate it to a different night. The move paid off and netted the episode a series-high 8.2 million viewers.

=== Contraction ===
While fewer and fewer viewers watch Sunday night shows on the actual night, opting to view them on DVR or streaming later, the network continues to program its most prestigious shows there. The Game of Thrones spin-off House of the Dragon is popular with audiences, but it has so far received lower ratings and worse reviews than its predecessor. The network has not had a show top Game of Thrones ratings records since. Due to resources going to Warner Media's streaming service HBO Max following its launch in 2020 and AT&T selling HBO's parent company in 2022, the network HBO has seen its total hours of scripted Sunday night programming decrease from its high-spending AT&T heyday. In recent years, the network has begun to rely on documentary series to fill outs its programming, which are less expensive than scripted shows. In addition to that, many of HBO's new Sunday night series are not based on original ideas like some of the network's biggest hits; instead, they're spin-offs and prequels to WarnerMedia film properties like Dune, It, Green Lantern, and Batman villain The Penguin. In summer of 2024, Slate ran a piece called "The End of HBO Sunday Nights", which covered the decline in cultural relevance of the programming block. In summer of 2026, ScreenRant ran a piece called, "It's Officially the End of an Era for HBO," criticizing the network's decision to debut its highly-anticipated Harry Potter series on a different day of the week than their Sunday night block.

== Lineup history ==
Year / Season		8:00 PM	8:30 PM	9:00 PM	9:30 PM	10:00 PM	10:30 PM	11:00 PM
1998	Early Spring					The Larry Sanders Show		
1998	Late Spring	From the Earth to the Moon		From the Earth to the Moon		The Larry Sanders Show		
1998	Summer			Sex and the City	Arli$$			
1999	Winter			The Sopranos				
1999	Early Summer			Sex and the City	Arli$$			
1999	Late Summer			Sex and the City				
2000	Winter			The Sopranos				
2000	Summer			Sex and the City	Arli$$			
2000	Fall			Curb Your Enthusiasm				
2001	Winter					Oz		
2001	Spring			The Sopranos				
2001	Summer			Six Feet Under		Sex and the City	Arli$$	
2001	Fall			Band of Brothers		The Mind of the Married Man	Curb Your Enthusiasm	
2001	Winter					Project Greenlight		
2002	Winter			Sex and the City	Project Greenlight	Oz		
2002	Spring			Six Feet Under				
2002	Early Summer			Arli$$		The Wire		
2002	Late Summer			Sex and the City	Arli$$	The Wire		
2002	Fall			The Sopranos		Curb Your Enthusiasm	The Mind of the Married Man	
2003	Winter					Oz		
2003	Spring			Six Feet Under				
2003	Summer			Sex and the City	Project Greenlight	The Wire		
2003	Early Fall			Carnivale		K Street		
2003	Late Fall	Angels in America		Angels in America		Angels in America		
2004	Early Winter			Curb Your Enthusiasm	Sex and the City			
2004	Late Winter			The Sopranos		Curb Your Enthusiasm		
2004	Spring			The Sopranos		Deadwood		
2004	Summer			Six Feet Under		Entourage	Da Ali G Show	
2004	Fall			The Wire		Family Bonds		
2005	Early Winter					Carnivale		
2005	Late Winter			Deadwood		Carnivale		
2005	Spring			Deadwood				
2005	Summer			Six Feet Under		Entourage	The Comeback	
2005	Fall			Rome		Curb Your Enthusiasm	Extras	
2006	Spring			The Sopranos		Big Love		
2006	Summer			Deadwood		Entourage	Lucky Louie	Dane Cook's Tourgasm
2006	Fall					The Wire		
2007	Winter			Rome				
2007	Spring			The Sopranos		Entourage		
2007	Summer			John From Cincinnati		Entourage	Flight of the Conchords	
2007	Fall			Tell Me You Love Me		Curb Your Enthusiasm		
2008	Winter			The Wire				
2008	Spring			John Adams				
2008	Summer			Generation Kill				
2008	Fall			True Blood		Entourage	Little Britain USA	The Life & Times of Tim
2008	Late Fall			True Blood		Entourage	Summer Heights High	The Life & Times of Tim
2009	Winter			Big Love		Flight of the Conchords	Eastbound and Down	
2009	Spring			The No. 1 Ladies' Detective Agency		In Treatment	In Treatment	Russell Simmons Presents Brave New Voices
2009	Summer			True Blood		Hung	Entourage	
2009	Fall			Curb Your Enthusiasm	Bored to Death	Entourage		
2010	Winter			Big Love		How to Make It in America		
2010	Spring			The Pacific		Treme		
2010	Summer			True Blood		Hung	Entourage	
2010	Fall			Boardwalk Empire		Bored to Death	Eastbound and Down	
2011	Winter			Big Love				
2011	Early Spring			Mildred Pierce				
2011	Late Spring			Game of Thrones		Treme		
2011	Summer			True Blood		Curb Your Enthusiasm	Entourage	
2011	Fall			Boardwalk Empire		Hung	How to Make It in America	
2012	Early Winter			Luck		Angry Boys	Angry Boys	
2012	Late Winter			Luck		Eastbound and Down	Life's Too Short	
2012	Spring			Game of Thrones		Veep	Girls	
2012	Summer			True Blood		The Newsroom		
2012	Fall			Boardwalk Empire		Treme		
2013	Winter			Girls	Enlightened			
2013	Spring			Game of Thrones		Veep	Family Tree	
2013	Summer			True Blood		The Newsroom		
2013	Fall			Boardwalk Empire		Eastbound and Down	Hello Ladies	
2013	Winter			Treme		Getting On	Ja'mie: Private School Girl	
2014	Winter			True Detective		Girls	Looking	
2014	Spring			Game of Thrones		Silicon Valley	Veep	Last Week Tonight with John Oliver
2014	Summer			True Blood		The Leftovers		Last Week Tonight with John Oliver
2014	Early Fall			Boardwalk Empire				Last Week Tonight with John Oliver
2014	Mid-Fall			The Newsroom		The Comeback	Getting On	Last Week Tonight with John Oliver
2015	Winter	The Jinx: The Life and Deaths of Robert Durst		Girls	Togetherness	Looking		Last Week Tonight with John Oliver
2015	Spring			Game of Thrones		Silicon Valley	Veep	Last Week Tonight with John Oliver
2015	Summer			True Detective		Ballers	The Brink	Last Week Tonight with John Oliver
2015	Early Fall			The Leftovers		Project Greenlight	Doll & Em	Last Week Tonight with John Oliver
2015	Late Fall			The Leftovers		Getting On		Last Week Tonight with John Oliver
2016	Winter			Vinyl		Girls	Togetherness	Last Week Tonight with John Oliver
2016	Spring			Game of Thrones		Silicon Valley	Veep	Last Week Tonight with John Oliver
2016	Summer			The Night Of		Ballers	Vice Principals	Last Week Tonight with John Oliver
2016	Fall			Westworld		Divorce	Insecure	Last Week Tonight with John Oliver
2017	Winter			The Young Pope				Last Week Tonight with John Oliver
2017	Mid-Winter			Big Little Lies		Girls	Crashing	Last Week Tonight with John Oliver
2017	Spring			Silicon Valley	Veep			Last Week Tonight with John Oliver
2017	Summer			Game of Thrones		Ballers	Insecure	Last Week Tonight with John Oliver
2017	Fall			The Deuce		Curb Your Enthusiasm	Vice Principals	Last Week Tonight with John Oliver
2018	Winter			Here and Now		Divorce	Crashing	Last Week Tonight with John Oliver
2018	Spring			Westworld		Silicon Valley	Barry	Last Week Tonight with John Oliver
2018	Summer			Sharp Objects		Succession		Last Week Tonight with John Oliver
2018	Early Fall			The Deuce		Ballers	Insecure	Last Week Tonight with John Oliver
2018	Mid-Fall			The Deuce		Camping		Last Week Tonight with John Oliver
2018	Late Fall			My Brilliant Friend		Camping	Sally4Ever	Last Week Tonight with John Oliver
2019	Winter			True Detective		Crashing	High Maintenance	Last Week Tonight with John Oliver
2019	Early Spring			The Case Against Adnan Syed		Barry	Veep	Last Week Tonight with John Oliver
2019	Mid-Spring			Game of Thrones		Barry	Veep	Last Week Tonight with John Oliver
2019	Early Summer			Big Little Lies		Euphoria		Last Week Tonight with John Oliver
2019	Late Summer			Succession		The Righteous Gemstones	Ballers	Last Week Tonight with John Oliver
2019	Fall			Watchmen		Silicon Valley	Mrs. Fletcher	Last Week Tonight with John Oliver
2020	Winter			The Outsider		Avenue 5	Curb Your Enthusiasm	Last Week Tonight with John Oliver
2020	Early Spring	Atlanta’s Missing and Murdered: The Lost Children		Westworld		Insecure	Run	Last Week Tonight with John Oliver
2020	Late Spring			I Know This Much Is True		Insecure	I May Destroy You	Last Week Tonight with John Oliver
2020	Early Summer			Perry Mason		I'll Be Gone in the Dark		Last Week Tonight with John Oliver
2020	Late Summer			Lovecraft Country		The Vow		Last Week Tonight with John Oliver
2020	Fall			The Undoing				Last Week Tonight with John Oliver
2021	Early Winter			The Lady and the Dale				Last Week Tonight with John Oliver
2021	Late Winter			Allen v. Farrow				Last Week Tonight with John Oliver
2021	Early Spring			Q: Into the Storm		Q: Into the Storm		Last Week Tonight with John Oliver
2021	Mid-Spring			The Nevers		Mare of Easttown		Last Week Tonight with John Oliver
2021	Late Spring			In Treatment	In Treatment			Last Week Tonight with John Oliver
2021	Summer			The White Lotus		100 Foot Wave		Last Week Tonight with John Oliver
2021	Early Fall			Scenes from a Marriage				Last Week Tonight with John Oliver
2021	Mid-Fall			Succession		Insecure	Curb Your Enthusiasm	Last Week Tonight with John Oliver
2022	Winter			Euphoria		The Righteous Gemstones	Somebody Somewhere	Last Week Tonight with John Oliver
2022	Early Spring			Winning Time: The Rise of the Lakers Dynasty		Barry	The Baby	Last Week Tonight with John Oliver
2022	Mid-Spring			The Time Traveler's Wife		Barry	The Baby	Last Week Tonight with John Oliver
2022	Summer			Westworld		The Anarchists		Last Week Tonight with John Oliver
2022	Early Fall			House of the Dragon				Last Week Tonight with John Oliver
2022	Late Fall			The White Lotus				Last Week Tonight with John Oliver
2023	Winter			The Last of Us				Last Week Tonight with John Oliver
2023	Spring	100 Foot Wave		Succession		Barry	Somebody Somewhere	Last Week Tonight with John Oliver
2023	Early Summer			The Idol		The Righteous Gemstones		Last Week Tonight with John Oliver
2023	Mid-Summer			Last Call: When a Serial Killer Stalked Queer New York		The Righteous Gemstones		Last Week Tonight with John Oliver
2023	Late Summer			Winning Time: The Rise of the Lakers Dynasty		Telemarketers		Last Week Tonight with John Oliver
2023	Fall			The Gilded Age				Last Week Tonight with John Oliver
2024	Winter			True Detective: Night Country		Curb Your Enthusiasm		Last Week Tonight with John Oliver
2024	Early Spring			The Regime		Curb Your Enthusiasm		Last Week Tonight with John Oliver
2024	Mid-Spring			The Sympathizer		The Jinx: Part Two		Last Week Tonight with John Oliver
2024	Late Spring			Ren Faire				Last Week Tonight with John Oliver
2024	Early Summer			House of the Dragon				Last Week Tonight with John Oliver
2024	Late Summer			Industry		Chimp Crazy		Last Week Tonight with John Oliver
2024	Early Fall			The Penguin		The Franchise	Somebody Somewhere	Last Week Tonight with John Oliver
2024	Late Fall			Dune: Prophecy			Somebody Somewhere	Last Week Tonight with John Oliver
2025	Winter			The White Lotus		The Righteous Gemstones		Last Week Tonight with John Oliver
2025	Spring			The Last of Us		The Righteous Gemstones	The Rehearsal	Last Week Tonight with John Oliver
2025	Summer			The Gilded Age		The Yogurt Shop Murders		Last Week Tonight with John Oliver
2025	Early Fall			Task		The Chair Company		Last Week Tonight with John Oliver
2025	Late Fall			It - Welcome to Derry		The Chair Company	I Love LA	Last Week Tonight with John Oliver
2026	Winter			Industry		A Knight of the Seven Kingdoms		Last Week Tonight with John Oliver
2026	Late Winter			DTF St. Louis		Rooster		Last Week Tonight with John Oliver
2026	Early Spring			DTF St. Louis		Rooster	The Comeback	Last Week Tonight with John Oliver
2026	Mid-Spring			Euphoria		Rooster	The Comeback	Last Week Tonight with John Oliver
2026	Late Spring			Euphoria				Last Week Tonight with John Oliver
2026	Later Spring							Last Week Tonight with John Oliver
2026	Early Summer			House of the Dragon				Last Week Tonight with John Oliver
2026	Late Summer			Lanterns				Last Week Tonight with John Oliver
2026	Early Fall			Lanterns		Youth		Last Week Tonight with John Oliver
2026	Mid-Fall			The Pet Cemetery Murders: A Ghost Story		Youth		Last Week Tonight with John Oliver
2026	Late Fall			The Gilded Age				Last Week Tonight with John Oliver
2026	Later Fall			The Gilded Age				Oobah: Scams for a Better Tomorrow

== Upcoming shows ==
Title	Season
Dune: Prophecy	Season 2 due to premiere in 2026
True Detective	Season 5 to premiere in 2027
The White Lotus	Season 4 expected to premiere in 2027
Rooster	Season 2 expected to premiere in 2027
The Last of Us	Season 3 expected to premiere in 2027
A Knight of the Seven Kingdoms	Season 2 to premiere 2027
House of the Dragon	Fourth and final season to premiere in 2028
The Chair Company	Season 2 to premiere TBD
I Love LA	Season 2 to premiere TBD
Industry	Fifth and final season to premiere TBD
Task	Season 2 to premiere TBD
The Chain	Miniseries to premiere TBD

== Genres produced by year ==
Throughout the lineup's history, the amount of original scripted series HBO has produced has fluctuated, with the number of total shows and shows of each genre rising from the 2000s, peaking from 2018–2019. During each of those years, HBO produced 14 total Sunday night shows, consisting of eight half-hour comedy series and six hour-long drama series. This table does not include acquired programming from other networks like Doll & Em and Summer Heights High. Co-productions, such as Industry, are counted as .5.

Year	Scripted Half-Hour Series	Scripted Hour-Long Series	Total Scripted Series
1998	3	0	3
1999	2	1	3
2000	3	1	4
2001	4	3	7
2002	4	4	8
2003	2	5	7
2004	4	4	8
2005	4	4	8
2006	2	4	6
2007	3	4	7
2008	3	4	7
2009	7	3	10
2010	5	5	10
2011	4	6	10
2012	5	6	11
2013	8	5	13
2014	6	6	12
2015	8	3	11
2016	8	4	12
2017	8	5	13
2018	8	6	14
2019	8	6	14
2020	5	6	11
2021	3	5	8
2022	4	6	10
2023	3	5	8
2024	3	6.5	9.5
2025	3	5	8
2026	4	5.5	9.5
