= Real Sports with Bryant Gumbel =

American sports oriented television series

- Presented by: Bryant Gumbel
- Country of origin: United States
- Original language: English
- No. of seasons: 29
- No. of episodes: 320

Original release
- Network: HBO
- Release: April 2, 1995 – December 19, 2023

Real Sports with Bryant Gumbel is an American monthly sports news magazine that aired on HBO from April 2, 1995 to December 19, 2023. The program was presented by television journalist and sportscaster Bryant Gumbel.

== Overview ==
=== Format ===
Each episode consisted of four stories covering society and sports, famous athletes, or problems afflicting sports.

As of 2018, the show has been honored with 32 Sports Emmy Awards and won Peabody Awards in 2012 and 2015. In September 2023, it was announced that the series would end after 29 seasons. The final episode aired on December 19, 2023.

Real Sports was the inspiration for two other HBO shows: On the Record with Bob Costas and Costas Now.

== Correspondents ==
Final correspondents:

- Bryant Gumbel (host)
- Mary Carillo
- Jon Frankel
- Andrea Kremer
- Soledad O'Brien
- David Scott
- Carl Quintanilla
- Kavitha Davidson
- Ariel Helwani

Former correspondents:

- James Brown
- Bryan Burwell
- Frank Deford
- Jim Lampley
- Sonja Steptoe
- Lesley Visser
- Armen Keteyian
- Bernard Goldberg

== Notable stories ==
=== Camel Jockeys – Sports of Sheikhs ===
In 2004, guided by human rights activist Ansar Burney, an HBO team used a hidden camera to document slavery, sexual abuse, and torture in secret desert camps where boys as young as three were trained to race camels, a national sport in the United Arab Emirates. This half-hour investigative report showed a system of child slavery involving thousands of young boys from Bangladesh and Pakistan who were kidnapped or sold. The report also questioned the sincerity of U.S. diplomacy in pressuring an ally, the UAE, to comply with its own stated policy of banning the use of children under 15 from camel racing.

The documentary won a Sports Emmy Award in 2004 for "Outstanding Sports Journalism" and the 2006 Alfred I. duPont–Columbia University Award for outstanding broadcast journalism. It also brought world attention to the plight of child camel jockeys in the Middle East and helped Ansar Burney Trust to convince the governments of Qatar and the UAE to end the use of children in this sport.

=== Jack Johnson and Kelly Slater singing "Home (Live from the Beach)" ===
During the summer of 2013, Jon Frankel's interview with Kelly Slater spawned an HBO Sports video of Jack Johnson and Kelly Slater performing "Home (Live from the Beach)".

== Controversial remarks ==
In February 2006, Gumbel made remarks regarding the Winter Olympics and the lack of African-American participation.

So try not to laugh when someone says these are the world's greatest athletes despite a paucity of blacks that makes the Winter Games look like a GOP convention.

On the August 15, 2006 episode of Real Sports with Bryant Gumbel, Gumbel made the following remarks about former NFL commissioner Paul Tagliabue and National Football League Players Association president Gene Upshaw and directed these comments to new commissioner Roger Goodell:

Before he cleans out his office have Paul Tagliabue show you where he keeps Gene Upshaw's leash. By making the docile head of the players union his personal pet, your predecessor has kept the peace without giving players the kind of guarantees other pros take for granted. Try to make sure no one competent ever replaces Upshaw on your watch.

In response, Tagliabue said, "What Gumbel said about Gene Upshaw and our owners is about as irresponsible as anything I've heard in a long time." Gumbel replied with, "It's a lot like covering any story [...] You see what is in front of you and you report on it."

On the October 18, 2011 episode, Gumbel invoked slavery in his criticism of NBA Commissioner David Stern over the league's lockout.

His efforts are typical of a commissioner who has always seemed eager to be viewed as some kind of modern-day plantation overseer, treating NBA men as if they were his boys. [...] His moves are intended to do little more than show how he's the one keeping the hired hands in their place.

== See also ==
- Outside the Lines
- E:60
- On the Record with Bob Costas
- Costas Now
- 60 Minutes Sports
