= Costas Now =

- Genre: Sports
- Presented by: Bob Costas
- Country of origin: United States
- Original language: English
- No. of seasons: 3

Production
- Running time: 60 minutes

Original release
- Network: HBO
- Release: May 13, 2005 – 2009

Costas Now is an American monthly sports television show hosted by Bob Costas that aired on HBO from May 13, 2005 to 2009.

== History ==
In 2001, Costas was hired by HBO to host a 12-week talk and interview series called On the Record with Bob Costas. In 2005, the program was revamped to become Costas Now, with more of a focus on sports and a year-round schedule in a 9 p.m. ET time slot. Costas Now was similar to another HBO sports show hosted by Bryant Gumbel called Real Sports with Bryant Gumbel.

In February 2009, Costas left HBO to sign with MLB Network, effectively ending Costas Now. HBO replaced it with a similar, short-lived program called Joe Buck Live, hosted by Fox Sports broadcaster Joe Buck.

== See also ==
- Later with Bob Costas
- Football Night in America
- Costas on the Radio
