= Joe Buck Live =

- Starring: Joe Buck
- Country of origin: United States
- No. of episodes: 3

Production
- Running time: 60 min.

Original release
- Network: HBO
- Release: June 15 – December 8, 2009

Related
- Costas Now

Joe Buck Live was a talk show hosted by sportscaster Joe Buck. The show aired on HBO from June 15 to December 8, 2009, being cancelled three months later. It replaced Costas Now, which Bob Costas hosted for HBO until February 2009, when he left for the MLB Network.

== First episode ==
The first guests to appear on the show were Brett Favre, Michael Irvin, Chad Ochocinco, David Wright, Paul Rudd, Artie Lange, and Jason Sudeikis. The episode drew attention for Lange's hilariously outrageous (but controversial) behavior and Buck's seeming inability to stop it.

Lange made remarks about Buck and Dallas Cowboys quarterback Tony Romo and called Romo's then-girlfriend, Jessica Simpson, a "fat chick" and compared her to Chris Farley. Lange continued to insult Buck after being asked to take his feet off the table, responding that "somebody should look natural on this show." Buck came back when Lange held a cigarette in his chin with no hands by saying "I think it's in chin number four." Lange then retorted by saying "Number four, the show you won't get to." Lange went on to tell the flustered host, "you're out of your league, Buck ... stick to play-by-play." Buck responded, "I know, believe me, it was right after this segment started that I realized that." Coincidentally, Buck did not make it to show number four, as it was canceled after three episodes.

HBO Sports President Ross Greenburg said Lange "bordered on bad taste" with his "mean-spirited" tone. But according to Lange on the next day's Howard Stern Show, Greenburg told him to "go nuts" if Rudd and Sudeikis start to get boring. Lange has since been banned from appearing on future HBO Sports shows, although he was in a pre-taped segment for the second episode of Joe Buck Live, where Buck runs away from Lange after accidentally running into him in Times Square.

Two other episodes aired in 2009. In March 2010, Buck told a St. Louis radio station that HBO might be planning to cancel the program. HBO subsequently confirmed the show's cancellation to Broadcasting & Cable.

== Second episode ==
Former NFL quarterbacks Dan Marino, John Elway and Joe Namath discuss sports; a round-table discussion features Jerry Jones and Mark Cuban; an interview with Curt Schilling. During an answer and question period with the audience, an audience member, Ryan Fernandez, jokingly questioned Marino's passing ability and produced a football. Marino instructed Fernandez to throw the ball to him. He then rocketed the ball back to Fernandez. Fernandez snagged the ball which prompted Joe Namath to remark, "Hellava Catch." Marino then beckoned for the ball again and gave it to two US Marines near the front row.
