= On the Record with Bob Costas =

- Also known as: Back on the Record with Bob Costas
- Presented by: Bob Costas
- Country of origin: United States
- No. of episodes: 48

Production
- Running time: 30 minutes/60 minutes

Original release
- Network: HBO
- Release: February 14, 2001 – June 18, 2004
- Release: July 30, 2021 – November 11, 2022

On the Record with Bob Costas is an American monthly sports television talk show hosted by the sportscaster Bob Costas. The show ran for four 12-week seasons on HBO from 2001 to 2004 before being revamped into Costas Now.

On the Record with Bob Costas was, in a sense, similar to Costas' previous late night talk show, Later, which Costas hosted on NBC from 1988 to 1994. Both programs featured one-on-one interviews with guests from the sports and show business.

In 2021, HBO announced a revival of the show, now titled Back on the Record with Bob Costas – presumably retitled to minimize confusion with the unrelated 2020 HBO Max documentary On the Record – which premiered on July 30, 2021, and air up to four times per year. In December 2022, HBO confirmed that the show was canceled after two seasons.

== See also ==
- Football Night in America
- Costas on the Radio
- Later with Bob Costas
