= List of awards and nominations received by George Carlin =

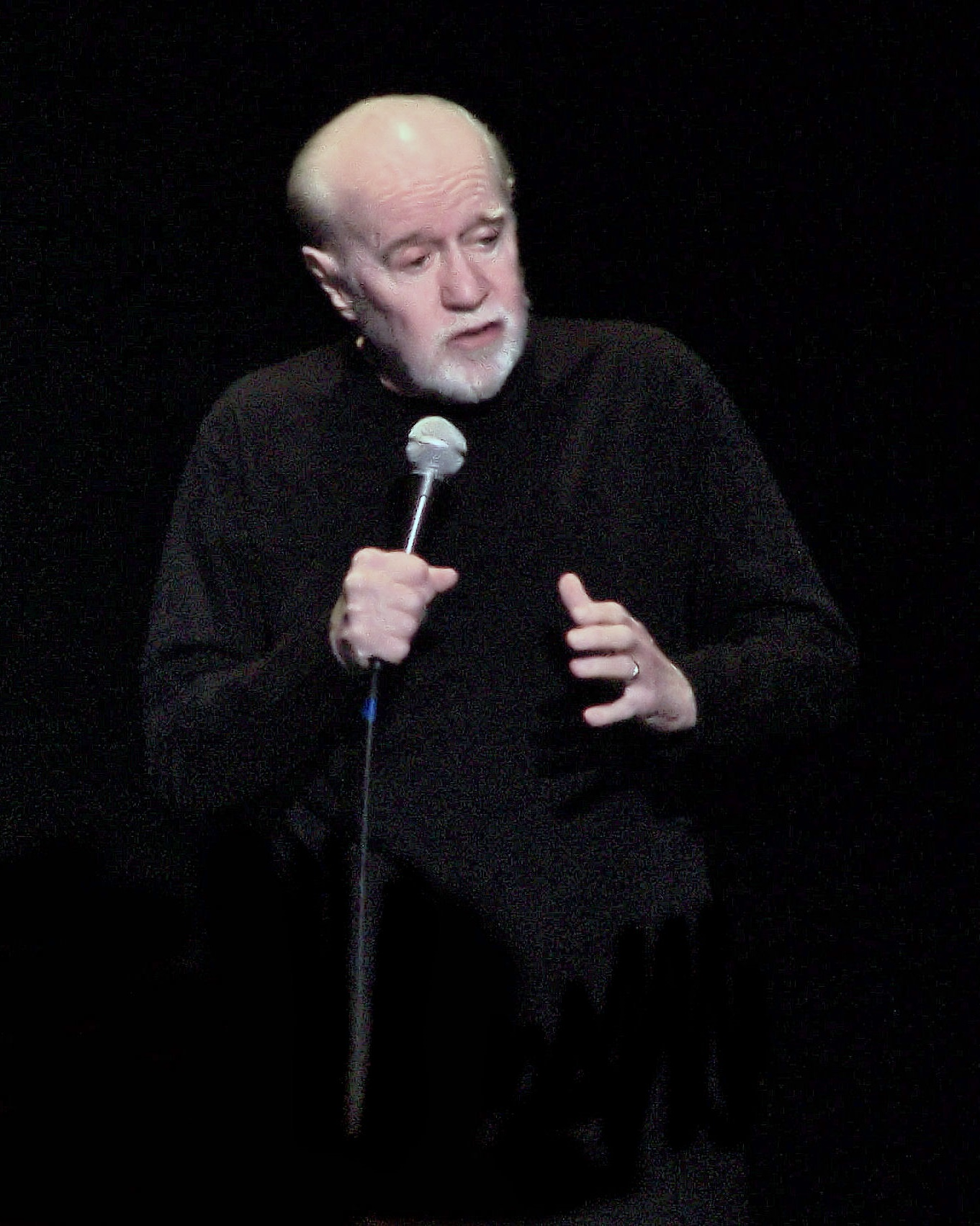
Carlin in 2008

This article is a List of awards and nominations received by George Carlin

Carlin received 17 Grammy Award nominations winning five Grammy Awards for Best Comedy Album winning for FM & AM (1972), Jammin' in New York (1992), Brain Droppings (2001), Napalm & Silly Putty (2002), and It's Bad for Ya (2008). For his work on television, Carlin was nominated for six Primetime Emmy Awards and two Daytime Emmy Awards.

He received a star on the Hollywood Walk of Fame and received the Kennedy Center's Mark Twain Prize for American Humor in 2008. In 2004, he placed second on Comedy Central's list of top 10 American comedians, and in 2017, Rolling Stone magazine ranked him second on its list of the 50 best stand-up comedians of all time, in both cases behind Richard Pryor.

== Major associations ==
=== Emmy Awards ===
Year	Category	Nominated work	Result	Ref.
Primetime Emmy Awards
1992	Outstanding Performance in a Variety or Music Program	George Carlin: Jammin' in New York	Nominated	
1997	Outstanding Performance in a Variety or Music Program	George Carlin: 40 Years of Comedy	Nominated	
1999	Outstanding Performance in a Variety or Music Program	George Carlin: You Are All Diseased	Nominated	
1999	Outstanding Variety Special	George Carlin: You Are All Diseased	Nominated	
2006	Outstanding Variety Special	George Carlin: Life Is Worth Losing	Nominated	
2008	Outstanding Variety Special	George Carlin: It's Bad for Ya	Nominated	
Daytime Emmy Awards
1992	Outstanding Performer in a Children's Series	Shining Time Station	Nominated	
1994	Outstanding Performer in a Children's Series	Shining Time Station	Nominated	

=== Grammy Awards ===
Year	Category	Nominated work	Result	Ref.
1968	Best Comedy Album	Take-Offs and Put-Ons	Nominated	
1973	Best Comedy Album	FM & AM	Won	
1974	Best Comedy Album	Occupation: Foole	Nominated	
1976	Best Comedy Album	An Evening with Wally Londo Featuring Bill Slaszo	Nominated	
1978	Best Comedy Album	On the Road	Nominated	
1983	Best Comedy Album	A Place for My Stuff	Nominated	
1987	Best Comedy Album	Playin' with Your Head	Nominated	
1989	Best Comedy Album	What Am I Doing in New Jersey?	Nominated	
1992	Best Comedy Album	Parental Advisory: Explicit Lyrics	Nominated	
1994	Best Comedy Album	Jammin' in New York	Won	
2000	Best Comedy Album	You Are All Diseased	Nominated	
2001	Best Comedy Album	Brain Droppings	Won	
2002	Best Comedy Album	Napalm and Silly Putty	Won	
2003	Best Comedy Album	Complaints and Grievances	Nominated	
2006	Best Spoken Word Album	When Will Jesus Bring the Pork Chops?	Nominated	
2007	Best Comedy Album	Life Is Worth Losing	Nominated	
2009	Best Comedy Album	It's Bad for Ya	Won	

== Miscellaneous accolades ==
=== American Comedy Awards ===
- 1987: Funniest Television Star in a Special - On Location - nominee
- 1997: Funniest Performer in a TV Special - George Carlin: Back in Town - winner
- 1998: Funniest Performer in a TV Special - George Carlin: 40 Years in Comedy - winner
- 2001: Lifetime Achievement in Comedy

=== CableAce Awards ===
- 1983: Writing in a Variety Program - On Location - nominee
- 1987: Writing in a Comedy Special - George Carlin: Playin' With Your Head - nominee
- 1989: Writing in a Comedy Special - George Carlin: What Am I Doing in New Jersey - nominee
- 1991: Writing an Entertainment Special - George Carlin: Doing it Again - nominee
- 1993: Stand-Up Comedy Special - George Carlin: Jammin' in New York - winner
- 1997: Writing an Entertainment Special - George Carlin: 40 Years in Comedy - winner

=== DVD Exclusive Awards ===
- 2006: Best Animated Character Voice-Over - Tarzan 2 - nominee

=== GoldDerby Awards ===
- 2008: Best Variety Performer - George Carlin: It's Bad for Ya - nominee

=== Photoplay Awards ===
- 1973: Variety Star
- 1975: Variety Star

== Honorary awards ==
- 1987 - Star on the Hollywood Walk of Fame at 1555 Vine Street
- 2008 - Mark Twain Prize for American Humor
