= Seven dirty words =

Words traditionally disallowed in U.S. broadcast radio and television

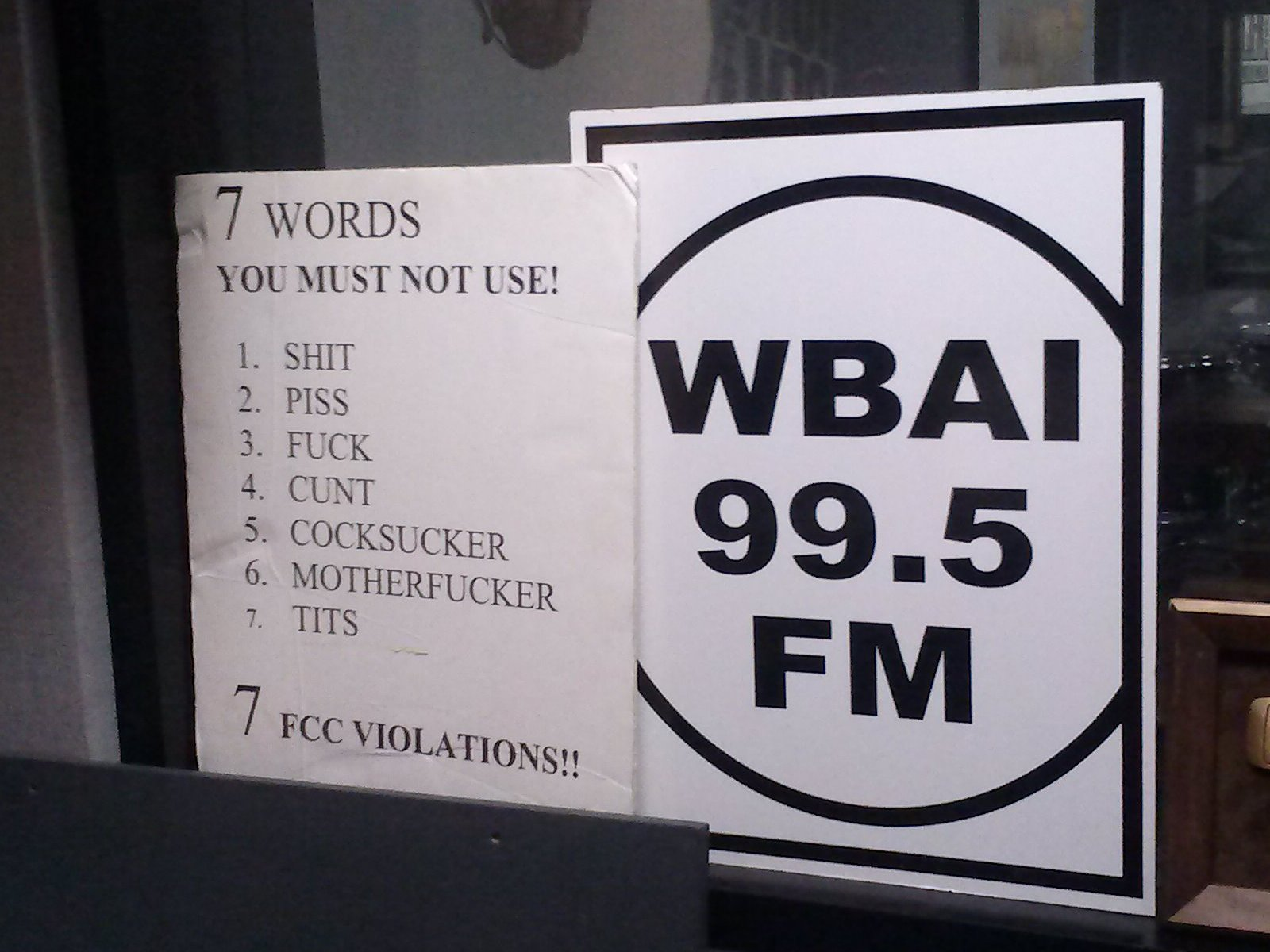
A poster in a WBAI broadcast booth which warns radio broadcasters against using the words

The seven dirty words are seven English-language profanities that the American comedian George Carlin first listed in his 1972 "Seven Words You Can Never Say on Television" monologue. The words, in the order Carlin listed them, are: "shit", "piss", "fuck", "cunt", "cocksucker", "motherfucker", and "tits".

These words were considered highly inappropriate and unsuitable for broadcast on the public airwaves in the United States, whether radio or television. As such, they were avoided in scripted material and bleep censored in the rare cases in which they were used. Broadcast standards differ in different parts of the world, then and now, although most of the words on Carlin's original list remain taboo on American broadcast television. Nonetheless, a radio broadcast featuring these words led to the U.S. Supreme Court's 5–4 decision in 1978 in FCC v. Pacifica Foundation that the Federal Communication Commission's declaratory ruling upholding a 1973 complaint about Carlin's routine being broadcast at 2 p.m. violated neither the First nor the Fifth Amendment to the U.S. Constitution, thus helping to define the extent to which the U.S. federal government could regulate speech on broadcast television and radio.

== Background ==
During a performance in 1966 the American comedian Lenny Bruce said he had been arrested for saying nine words: "ass", "balls", "cocksucker", "cunt", "fuck", "motherfucker", "piss", "shit", and "tits". In 1972 the comedian George Carlin released his fourth stand-up album, Class Clown. One track on the album, "Seven Words You Can Never Say on Television", was a monologue in which he identified these words and expressed amazement that they could not be used regardless of context. In a 2004 NPR interview, he said:

I don't know that there was a "Eureka!" moment or anything like that. [...] On these other things, we get into the field of hypocrisy. Where you really cannot pin down what these rules they want to enforce are. It's just impossible to say "this is a blanket rule". You'll see some newspapers print "f blank blank k". Some print "f asterisk asterisk k". Some put "f blank blank blank". Some put the word "bleep". Some put "expletive deleted". So there's no real consistent standard. It's not a science. It's a notion that they have and it's superstitious. These words have no power. We give them this power by refusing to be free and easy with them. We give them great power over us. They really, in themselves, have no power. It's the thrust of the sentence that makes them either good or bad.

Carlin was arrested for disturbing the peace when he performed the routine at a show at Summerfest in Milwaukee in 1972. On his next album, 1973's Occupation: Foole, he performed a similar routine titled "Filthy Words", dealing with the same list and many of the same themes. Pacifica station WBAI broadcast this version of the routine uncensored on October 30 that year.

== Federal Communications Commission v. Pacifica Foundation ==
In 1973 John Douglas, an active member of Morality in Media, claimed that he heard a WBAI broadcast of the comedy routine while driving with his then 15-year-old son, Dean, and complained to the Federal Communications Commission (FCC) that the material was inappropriate for the time of day (approximately 2:00 pm).

Following the lodging of the complaint, the FCC proceeded to ask Pacifica for a response, then issued a declaratory order upholding the complaint. No specific sanctions were included in the order, but WBAI was put on notice that "in the event subsequent complaints are received, the Commission will then decide whether it should utilize any of the available sanctions it has been granted by Congress". WBAI appealed against this declaratory ruling, and the ruling was overturned by the United States Court of Appeals for the District of Columbia Circuit in a 2–1 decision on the grounds that the FCC's definition of "indecency" was overbroad and vague and thus violated the First Amendment's guarantee of free speech. The FCC in turn appealed to the Supreme Court. As an independent federal agency, the FCC filed the appeal in its own name. The United States Department of Justice intervened in the case, supporting Pacifica's argument that the FCC's declaratory ruling violated the First Amendment and that it also violated the Fifth Amendment in that the FCC's definition of "indecency" was too vague to support criminal penalties.

In 1978 the Supreme Court, in a 5–4 decision, ruled that the FCC's declaratory ruling did not violate either the First or Fifth Amendment to the U.S. Constitution, but it limited the scope of its decision to the specific broadcast that caused the declaratory ruling and declined to consider whether the FCC's definition of indecency would survive a First Amendment challenge if applied to the broadcast of other material containing the same or similar words which had been cited in Pacifica's brief (e.g., works of Shakespeare – "pissing conduits", "bawdy hand of the dial on the prick of noon"; the Bible – "he who pisseth against the wall"; the Watergate Tapes). It noted that while the declaratory ruling pertained to the meaning of the term "indecency" as used in a criminal statute (18 USC 1464), since the FCC had not imposed any penalty on Pacifica, the Court did not need to reach the question as to whether the definition was too vague to satisfy the due process requirements of the Fifth Amendment.

This decision formally established indecency regulation in American broadcasting. In follow-up rulings, the Supreme Court established the safe harbor provision that grants broadcasters the right to broadcast indecent (but not obscene) material between the hours of 10 pm and 6 am, when it is presumed few children would be watching. The FCC has never maintained a specific list of words prohibited from the airwaves during the time period from 6 am to 10 pm.

The seven dirty words have been assumed to be likely to elicit indecency-related action by the FCC if uttered on a TV or radio broadcast, and thus the broadcast networks generally censor themselves with regard to many of the seven dirty words. The FCC regulations regarding "fleeting" use of expletives were ruled unconstitutionally vague by a three-judge panel of the U.S. 2nd Circuit Court of Appeals in New York on July 13, 2010, as they violated the First Amendment due to their possible effects regarding free speech.

== The words ==
The original seven words named by Carlin are, in order:

1. shit
2. piss
3. fuck
4. cunt
5. cocksucker
6. motherfucker
7. tits

In subsequent routines, Carlin would frequently deconstruct the list, proposing additions or deletions based on audience feedback, or sometimes on his own whims. For example, in George Carlin: Again! special, he explained a man asked him to remove motherfucker because, as a derivative of fuck, it constituted a duplication: "He says motherfucker is a duplication of the word fuck, technically, because fuck is the root form, motherfucker being derivative; therefore, it constitutes duplication. And I said, 'Hey, motherfucker, how did you get my phone number, anyway?'"

He later added it back, claiming the bit's rhythm does not work without it. In his comedy routine, Carlin would make fun of each word; for example, he would say that tits should not be on the list because it sounds like a nickname ("Hey, Tits, c'mere!") or the name of a snack food ("New Nabisco Tits! ... corn tits, cheese tits, tater tits!").

A follow-up routine, titled "Filthy Words" (featured on his album Occupation: Foole) sees Carlin revisiting the original list and admitting that it is not complete, proceeding to add the words "fart", "turd", and "twat" to the list. He brings this up again in another follow-up routine, "Dirty Words" (featured in George Carlin: Again!), still feeling the list was not yet complete, and assures the audience: "Some of your favorites might make the list this year!"

== Availability ==
Carlin performed the routine many times and included it, in whole or in part, on several of his records and HBO specials. Parts or all of the performance appear on the following releases:

- 1972 – Class Clown – Audio recording – "Seven Words You Can Never Say on Television"
- 1973 – Occupation: Foole – Audio recording – "Filthy Words"
- 1977 – George Carlin at USC – HBO special – "Forbidden Words"
- 1978 – George Carlin: Again! – HBO special – "Dirty Words"
- 1983 – Carlin at Carnegie – HBO special – "Filthy Words"

The Carlin at Carnegie version can be heard as "An Incomplete List of Impolite Words" on the 1984 album Carlin on Campus (but not in the HBO special, Carlin on Campus). That version of the list features over 300 dirty words and phrases in an effort to stop people telling him that he left something off the list. Four days after Carlin's original Class Clown recording, the routine was performed again for students at the University of California, Los Angeles. This would be months before its first official release. The recording was restored in December 2013 and uploaded to YouTube by archivists at UCLA and could be accessed free of charge, but is no longer available due to a claim of copyright infringement. The FCC ruling is referenced in "Offensive Language" from the album Parental Advisory: Explicit Lyrics and HBO special Doin' It Again, both 1990 recordings of the same performance; however, the routine that follows is entirely different.

The Class Clown version can also be heard on the vinyl/cassette only release Indecent Exposure (1978). The Occupation: Foole version can also be heard on Classic Gold (1992). Both versions were re-released again as part of The Little David Years (1971–1977).

== H.R. 3687 ==
U2 singer Bono said on live television that his 2003 Golden Globe Award was "really, really fucking brilliant!" Despite complaints, the Federal Communications Commission (FCC) did not fine the network. In apparent reaction, on December 8, 2003, Representative Doug Ose (R-California) introduced H.R. 3687, the "Clean Airwaves Act", in Congress to designate a derivative list of Carlin's offensive words as profane in the U.S. Code. The stated purpose of the bill was "To amend section 1464 of title 18 of the United States Code, to provide for the punishment of certain profane broadcasts." In the text of the bill, the words shit, piss, fuck, cunt, asshole, cocksucker, and motherfucker, as well as the phrase ass hole are specifically listed. The bill was not enacted.

== See also ==
- Communications Decency Act
- Family Reunion, referencing the Seven Dirty Words
- Morality in Media
- Profanity
- The Green Book (BBC)
- Watershed (broadcasting)
