= Kelly Carlin =

American radio host (born 1963)

- Born: June 15, 1963 (age 63); Dayton, Ohio, U.S.
- Occupations: Radio host; actress; screenwriter; producer
- Years active: 1978–present
- Spouses: Andrew Sutton (m. 1985; div. 1993) Robert McCall (m. 1998)
- Relatives: George Carlin (father)
- Website: thekellycarlinsite.com

Kelly Marie Carlin (born June 15, 1963) is an American radio host, actress, screenwriter, and producer.

== Early life ==
Kelly Marie Carlin was born at Good Samaritan Hospital in Dayton, Ohio, on June 15, 1963. She is the only child of comedian George Carlin and his first wife, Brenda Hosbrook.

== Career ==
Carlin has a BA in communications from the University of California, Los Angeles (UCLA). She began her career in entertainment as a production assistant and photographer for two of her father's early HBO specials: George Carlin: Again! and Carlin on Campus. In 1984, she co-starred in the George Carlin HBO TV show Apt. 2C, for which only the pilot episode was ever made.

In 1994, Carlin co-wrote the episode "George Pulls the Plug" for the second season of The George Carlin Show with her second husband, Robert McCall. She also co-wrote the script for the 1998 film Devil in the Flesh starring Rose McGowan. In the late 1990s, she began to stray away from mainstream media and began writing, producing and hosting an early Internet series as well as performing a one-person show entitled "Driven to Distraction," about her childhood, her struggles with drugs and alcohol, her poor personal relationships, and her mother's death in May 1997. In 2001, she earned a master's degree in Jungian depth psychology and expressed an interest in becoming a therapist but later returned to stage performing.

After her father's death in 2008, Carlin had initially discussed publishing an oral history of her father's life based on stories by friends and family. By December 2009, however, she had shelved that project and began to focus on her own memoirs. She also began interviewing legendary comedians in the "On Comedy" CD series for Marshall Berle's Laugh.com, of which her father was one of the founding partners.

Carlin has regularly performed her one-person show A Carlin Home Companion (a play on A Prairie Home Companion by Garrison Keillor), detailing her experiences growing up with her famous father. She was also a producer for the second season of The Green Room with Paul Provenza in 2011 and for a time hosted The Kelly Carlin Show on Sirius XM Radio's Raw Dog Comedy, and Waking From the American Dream on SModcast Internet Radio. Her book, A Carlin Home Companion: Growing Up With George was published in 2015. In 2022, a four-hour documentary she had a part in creating and starring in, George Carlin's American Dream, was released on HBO Max. It was directed by Judd Apatow and Michael Bonfiglio. In May 2022, Kelly Carlin and Judd Apatow were interviewed on MSNBC to discuss the project.

In 2024, following the release of an unauthorized comedy special called I'm Glad I'm Dead, which featured an audio deepfake of her father's voice reading a purportedly AI-generated script, Carlin tweeted, "My dad spent a lifetime perfecting his craft from his very human life, brain and imagination. No machine will ever replace his genius. These AI-generated products are clever attempts at trying to recreate a mind that will never exist again. Let's let the artist's work speak for itself. [...] Here's an idea, how about we give some actual living human comedians a listen to? But if you want to listen to the genuine George Carlin, he has 14 specials that you can find anywhere." Carlin issued a lawsuit against the video's creators, in response to which a spokesperson for one of the team behind it said the script had been written by a human author, Chad Kultgen, rather than by AI.

== Personal life ==
Carlin is a Buddhist.

Carlin was married to Andrew Sutton from 1985 until their divorce in 1993. She married Robert McCall in 1998. She has no children.
