= On location =

On location can refer to:

- Location shooting, the shooting of a film or television production in a real-world setting rather than a sound stage or studio backlot, also known as "filming on location"
  - Filming location, a place where a film or TV show is filmed, separate from a sound stage or studio backlot
- On Location (TV series), an HBO stand-up comedy series
- On Location Vacations, an American media company and blog covering filming locations and filming news
- Adobe OnLocation, computer software for recording directly to a disk
