= Carlin at Carnegie =

1982 George Carlin special

Carlin at Carnegie is George Carlin's third special to be seen on HBO, recorded at Carnegie Hall, New York City in 1982, released in 1983. Most of the material comes from A Place for My Stuff, his ninth album released earlier that same year. Unlike the first two, this special was edited down to an hour and routines from the same show like "A Place for My Stuff" and "Baseball and Football" do not appear in this special. The performance of "Seven Dirty Words," his last recorded performance of the routine, features Carlin's updated list of inappropriate words.

In a January 1983 interview about the special, Carlin stated that his recent material had concentrated on "minutae, the little things that amuse and confound us." He also spoke about a renewed focus on creating comic characters.

In comedy, "you have kind of a tool kit," Carlin explains. "I like the fact that I can write well, but I can also add my body to it...I feel I've got several things to offer, and I haven't really delved into the character stuff much at all. Most of my characters are supporting players for what I'm trying to tell. But what I'm gonna do soon is get to work on a lot of these characters, in costume and in makeup."

== Track listing ==
1. "Program opening"
2. "Abortion"
3. "Professional Comedian"
4. "Heart Attack"
5. "Rice Krispies"
6. "Have a Nice Day"
7. "Ice Box Man"
8. "Fussy Eater 1 & 2"
9. "New News"
10. "The Musical Portion of the Show"
11. "Dogs & Cats"
12. "Filthy Words"

== See also ==
- On Location (TV series)
