= Back in Town =

Back in Town may refer to:

- Back in Town (George Carlin album), 1996
- Back in Town (Matt Dusk album), 2006
- Back in Town (Mel Tormé album), 1959
- Back in Town (The Kingston Trio album), 1964
- Back in Town (Rob Schneiderman album), 2004
- "Back in Town", a song by Florence + the Machine from their 2022 album Dance Fever
