= The George Carlin Show =

US television series

- Genre: Sitcom
- Created by: George Carlin; Sam Simon
- Written by: Sam Simon
- Directed by: Jeffrey Melman; Rob Schiller; Sam Simon
- Starring: George Carlin; Alex Rocco; Paige French; Anthony Starke; Christopher Rich; Michael G. Hagerty
- Theme music composer: Chandler Travis
- Composer: Roger Boyce
- Country of origin: United States
- Original language: English
- No. of seasons: 2
- No. of episodes: 27

Production
- Executive producers: George Carlin; Sam Simon; Jerry Hamza
- Producer: Michael Stanislavsky
- Cinematography: Gregg Heschong
- Editor: Brian K. Roberts
- Camera setup: Multi-camera
- Running time: 22–24 minutes
- Production companies: Sweet Freedom Productions; Main Sequence; Warner Bros. Television

Original release
- Network: Fox
- Release: January 16, 1994 – July 16, 1995

The George Carlin Show is an American sitcom that aired Sunday at 9:30 pm on the Fox network from January 1994 to July 1995. It was created by Sam Simon, who executive produced the show jointly with the show's namesake, comedian George Carlin. On the show, Carlin played a New York City taxicab driver.

== Synopsis ==
The action was centered on George O'Grady (George Carlin), a taxicab driver living in New York City. Most of the scenes took place in The Moylan Tavern, owned and run by bartender Jack Donahue (Anthony Starke), who had inherited the establishment from his father. The setting's real-life basis was the actual, now-defunct Moylan Tavern, a bar that existed during Carlin's childhood on Broadway between La Salle Street and Tiemann Place, in the Morningside Heights neighborhood, and owned by the grandparents of film critic and author Maitland McDonagh. Carlin recalled in 1994 how he was a frequent customer of the bar: "It was where I saw Oswald shot. It was where I headed during the [1965] blackout. The Moylan is where I came of age." The name of the show's bartender character, Jack Donahue, was taken from that of real-life owner Jimmy Donahue, who bought the bar from the original owners. The set itself, however, resembled another upper-Broadway bar, Carlin said: "Cannon's—where my father used to drink."

== Cast ==
Promotional image of the cast members from The George Carlin Show, far left: Paige French, Michael G. Hagerty, Christopher Rich, Anthony Starke, Alex Rocco; front row: George Carlin, Susan Sullivan

=== Main ===
- George Carlin as George O'Grady, a New York city cabdriver and regular patron of The Moylan Tavern
- Alex Rocco as Harry Rossetti, George's best friend, an ex-con bookie
- Paige French as Sydney Paris, waitress at The Moylan, and aspiring model/actress
- Anthony Starke as Jack Donahue, bartender/owner of The Moylan
- Christopher Rich as Dr. Neil Beck, a plastic surgeon who is quite unlike the blue-collar Moylan regulars
- Michael G. Hagerty as Frank MacNamara, a working-class Moylan's regular

=== Recurring ===
The following characters appeared in at least 5 episodes:

- Susan Sullivan as Kathleen Rachowski, a pet-shop owner and George's girlfriend
- Phil LaMarr as Bob Brown, a friend of George's during season 1
- Matt Landers as Larry Pinkerton, an ex-cop who lives in George's building and hangs out with George at The Moylan
- Iqbal Theba as Inzamamulhaq Siddiqui, a fellow cabdriver of George's

Note that while Sullivan appeared in publicity cast photos, she appeared in only 7 episodes, receiving "Special Guest Star" billing in the closing credits.

== Episodes ==
=== Season 1 (1994) ===
No. overall	No. in season	Title	Directed by	Written by	Original release date
1	1	"When Unexpected Things Happen to George"	Sam Simon	Story by : Sam Simon; Teleplay by : George Carlin & Sam Simon	January 16, 1994
Dr. Neil Beck, plastic surgeon and new denizen of the Moylan Tavern, loses a bet to George. Unable to come up with cash on the spot, he gives George his dog as payment—a Yorkshire terrier he renames Miles, after jazz great Miles Davis.
2	2	"George Sees an Airplane"	Sam Simon	Sam Simon	January 23, 1994
Driving Dr. Beck to his home in Connecticut, George sees what looks like a U.F.O. in the sky. In attempting to convince his fellow Moylan patrons that he saw it, his sanity is questioned.
3	3	"George Goes on a Date: Part 1"	Sam Simon	Sam Simon	February 6, 1994
George decides to ask pet-shop owner Kathleen Rachowski out on a date, over 8 years after his last real relationship.
4	4	"George Goes on a Date: Part 2"	Sam Simon	Sam Simon	February 13, 1994
George's date with pet-shop owner Kathleen is interrupted when he discovers his dog Miles has run away.
5	5	"George Helps Sidney"	Steve Zuckerman	Heide Perlman & Sam Simon	February 20, 1994
George encourages Sydney to jump-start her languishing modeling career. As she is about to leave The Moylan for a hard-won interview with an agency, George accidentally hits her in the nose with a billiard ball, leaving her temporarily disfigured. Undaunted, she arrives for the interview.
6	6	"George Expresses Himself"	Rob Schiller	Story by : Sam Simon; Teleplay by : George Carlin & Sam Simon	February 27, 1994
George lands an appearance on the local TV news to rebut a recent on-air editorial that he feels is hypercritical of cabbies. However, he ends up delivering a rebuttal that is different than the one he'd initially planned.
7	7	"George Gets Some Money"	Sam Simon	Maria Semple	March 6, 1994
George takes a fare who is passed-out drunk on an hours-long ride around Central Park. His friends call his ethics into question when he nets over $600 for the fare.
8	8	"George Destroys a Way of Life"	Jeff Melman	Brian Pollack & Mert Rich	March 20, 1994
The obsessed cinephiles of an abruptly closed classic-movie revival house descend upon The Moylan to drown their sorrows, commandeering the television for several nights, much to the consternation of the sports-loving regular clientele.
9	9	"George Loses His Thermos"	Rob Schiller	Jim McCoulf	March 27, 1994
George brings his prized Thermos into The Moylan. When it disappears, he accuses his friends of stealing it, much to their dismay.
10	10	"George Digs Rock ‘n’ Roll Music"	Rob Schiller	Brian Pollack & Mert Rich	April 10, 1994
George attempts to help once-famous but now down-and-out musician Tommy Rawlins (guest star Brian Doyle Murray) to regain some self-respect and get back on his feet.
11	11	"George Speaks His Mind"	Rob Schiller	Jim McCoulf	April 24, 1994
After an encounter with his ex-wife in his cab, George, now in a very dark mood, runs afoul of an undercover inspector from the New York City Taxi and Limousine Commission, drawing a citation for using profanity on the job. He goes before the commissioner in a hearing to plead his case.
12	12	"George Looks Down the Wrong End of a .38"	Jeff Melman	Robert Rabinowitz & Ronald Winter	May 1, 1994
George is driving Dr. Beck to the Moylan Tavern when a desperate criminal hijacks the taxicab. The cowardly Beck escapes, leaving George to fend for himself.
13	13	"George Plays a Mean Pinball"	Jeff Melman	Dennis Carlin & Patrick Carlin	May 8, 1994
After learning the hard way that Kathleen is the better pinball player, George's views of feminism are challenged.
14	14	"George Lifts the Holy Spirit"	Sam Simon	Andrew Nicholls and Darrell Vickers	May 15, 1994
Harry steals a shipping truck containing a statue of Jesus Christ in the cargo area, then enlists a reluctant George to help him hide it.

=== Season 2 (1994–95) ===
No. overall	No. in season	Title	Directed by	Written by	Original release date
15	1	"George Gets a Big Surprise"	Jeff Melman	Andrew Nicholls & Darrell Vickers	October 16, 1994
George discovers he has a son, and takes him ice fishing.
16	2	"George Runs Into an Old Friend"	Jeff Melman	Jonathan Aibel and Glenn Berger	October 23, 1994
George intercepts a package meant for his neighbor (guest star Tommy Chong) which turns out to contain marijuana, and attempts to get rid of it.
17	3	"George Goes Too Far"	Jeff Melman	Spike Feresten	October 30, 1994
George is caught on hidden camera cheating a fare who turns out to be an investigative reporter from the local TV news. The footage is aired, and George must deal with the fallout.
18	4	"George Gets Hoist by His Own Petard"	Jeff Melman	Jim McCoulf & Jeff Lowell	November 6, 1994
George becomes concerned when Sydney and Dr. Beck decide to begin dating, and chaperones them on an evening visit to Beck's parents' mansion.
19	5	"George Pulls the Plug"	Jeff Melman	Kelly Carlin-McCall & Bob McCall	November 13, 1994
George is inexplicably given power of attorney over a stranger who is in a coma, and must decide whether or not he is taken off life support.
20	6	"George Gets Caught in the Middle"	Jeff Melman	Jim McCoulf & Jeff Lowell	November 27, 1994
Harry's wife (guest star Adrienne Barbeau) blackmails George in an attempt to find out if and with whom Harry is having an affair.
21	7	"George Really Does It This Time"	Jeff Melman	Robert Borden	December 4, 1994
After cleaning his apartment George causes apocalyptic problems.
22	8	"George Shoots Himself in the Foot"	Brian K. Roberts	Jim McCoulf & Jeff Lowell	December 11, 1994
Both of George's ex-wives show up and he tries to pair them off with his friends.
23	9	"George Does a Bad Thing"	Rob Schiller	Story by : Roger Garrett; Teleplay by : Jim McCoulf & Jeff Lowell	December 18, 1994
After being asked, George purchases a pornographic magazine for a child.
24	10	"George Puts On a Happy Face"	Jeff Melman	Rick Cunningham	December 25, 1994
After being confronted with numerous taxi customer complaints George is asked to smile more.
25	11	"George Helps a Friend"	Rob Schiller	Patrick Carlin	January 1, 1995
George helps his priest friend as he questions leaving the priesthood.
26	12	"George Tells the Truth"	Jeff Melman	Jeff Lowell	July 9, 1995
Jack tries to Irish theme the bar, and George takes a truth serum while looking to buy a gift for his girlfriend.
27	13	"George Likes a Good War"	Jeff Melman	Jim McCoulf	July 16, 1995
George and Harry feud when they find an old bet between their fathers, based around which side would win World War II. Frank gets his jaw wired shut, and Beck has an epiphany.

== George Carlin's criticism ==
Carlin noted on his website:

January, 1994 - "The George Carlin Show" premieres on Fox Television. Lasts 27 episodes. Lesson learned: always check mental health of creative partner beforehand. Loved the actors, loved the crew. Had a great time. Couldn't wait to get the fuck out of there. Canceled December, 1995.

He later elaborated in his posthumously published autobiography Last Words:

I had a great time. I never laughed so much, so often, so hard as I did with cast members Alex Rocco, Chris Rich, Tony Starke. There was a very strange, very good sense of humor on that stage...The biggest problem, though, was that Sam Simon was a fucking horrible person to be around. Very, very funny, extremely bright and brilliant, but an unhappy person who treated other people poorly...I was incredibly happy when the show was canceled. I was frustrated that it had taken me away from my true work.

He went on to speak in the book of not enjoying the committee-style writer's room, which he felt alienated anyone who was not a professional television writer.

Simon in 2013 addressed Carlin's comments, saying:

I think the cancellation [of the show] affected George's attitude towards the work in retrospect, because he was always just a complete doll [to work with], and I know that he had some bitterness... that I heard later on. Which made me feel really bad, because we got along really well, I loved him, and I consider it a very special period of my life... He was just fantastic. - Sam Simon

== Reception ==
The show received an approval rating of 88% on review aggregator Rotten Tomatoes, based on eight reviews.

Todd Everett of Variety, gave the show a positive review, saying: "The Moylan Tavern -- and Carlin's aging hipster character translates well to the sitcom stage. This is the comic without much of the acid that frequently flows in his standup routines. It's a half hour that's easy to take, and Carlin fans won't be disappointed."

David Hiltbrand of People Magazine, also gave a positive review of the show, saying: "The sitcom’s flavor is somewhat bland, with just a whiff of desperation about it. But the mix of characters is likable, and how many Fox shows can you say that about?”
