= George Carlin =

American stand-up comedian (1937–2008)

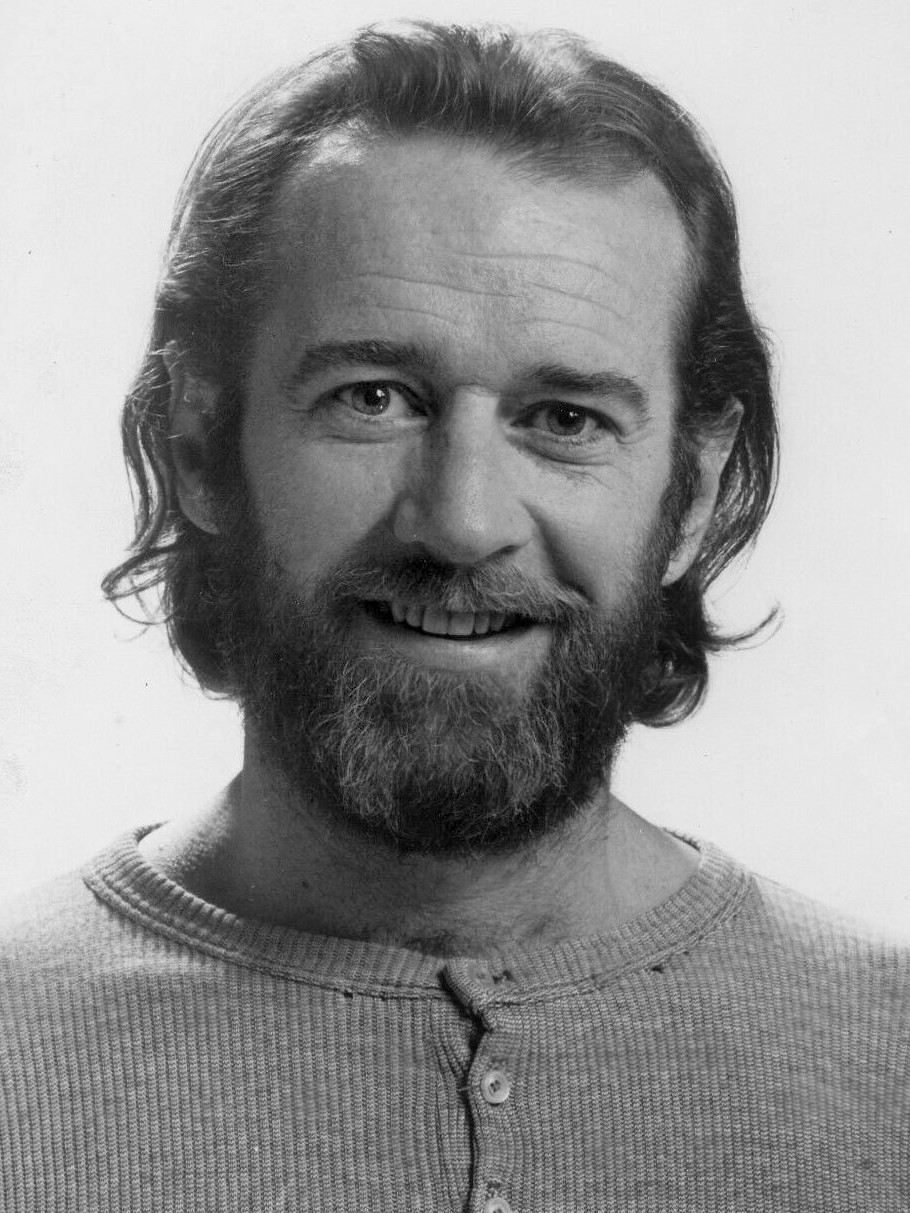
- Carlin in 1975
- Born: George Denis Patrick Carlin; May 12, 1937; New York City, New York, U.S.
- Died: June 22, 2008 (aged 71); Santa Monica, California, U.S.
- Occupations: Stand-up comedian; social critic; actor; author
- Spouses: Brenda Hosbrook (m. 1961; died 1997) Sally Wade (m. 1998)
- Children: Kelly Carlin

Comedy career
- Years active: 1959–2008
- Medium: Stand-up; film; television; radio; literature
- Genres: Political satire; observational comedy; surreal humor; black comedy; insult comedy; sarcasm
- Subjects: Mass media/news media/media criticism; American politics; American culture; current events; religion; pop culture; philosophy
- Military service
- Allegiance: United States
- Branch: United States Air Force
- Service years: 1956–1957
- Website: georgecarlin.com

George Denis Patrick Carlin (May 12, 1937 – June 22, 2008) was an American stand-up comedian, satirist, social critic, actor and author. Widely regarded as one of the greatest and most influential comedians of all time, he was known for his stand-up routines, combining elements of dark comedy and commentary on topics such as contemporary politics, the English language, psychology, and religion.

Carlin was a frequent performer and guest host on The Tonight Show Starring Johnny Carson and hosted the first episode of Saturday Night Live in 1975, both on NBC. The first of his 14 stand-up comedy specials for HBO was filmed in 1977, broadcast as George Carlin at USC. From the late 1980s onward, Carlin's routines focused on sociocultural criticism of American society. He often commented on political issues and satirized American culture. His "seven dirty words" routine was central to the 1978 United States Supreme Court case FCC v. Pacifica Foundation, in which a 5–4 decision affirmed the government's power to censor indecent material on public airwaves.

Carlin released his first solo album, Take-Offs and Put-Ons, in 1966. He won five Grammy Awards for Best Comedy Album, for FM & AM (1972), Jammin' in New York (1992), Brain Droppings (2001), Napalm and Silly Putty (2002), and It's Bad for Ya (2008). The lattermost was his final comedy special, filmed less than four months before his death from cardiac failure.

Carlin co-created and starred in the Fox sitcom The George Carlin Show (1994–1995). He is also known for his film performances in Car Wash (1976), Outrageous Fortune (1987), Bill & Ted's Excellent Adventure (1989), Bill & Ted's Bogus Journey (1991), The Prince of Tides (1991), Dogma (1999), Jay and Silent Bob Strike Back (2001), Scary Movie 3 (2003), and Jersey Girl (2004). He had voice roles as Zugor in Tarzan II, Fillmore in Cars (2006), Mr. Conductor on Shining Time Station (1991–1995), and the narrator on the American dubs of Thomas & Friends.

Carlin was posthumously awarded the Mark Twain Prize for American Humor in 2008. He placed second on Comedy Central's list of top 10 American comedians in 2004, while Rolling Stone magazine ranked him second on its list of the 50 best stand-up comedians of all time in 2017, in both cases behind Richard Pryor and ahead of Lenny Bruce.

== Early life ==
George Denis Patrick Carlin was born at New York Hospital (now Weill Cornell Medical Center) in Manhattan, New York on May 12, 1937, to Mary (née Bearey; 1896–1984) and Patrick John Carlin (1888–1945). He had an older brother, Patrick Jr. (1931–2022), who had a major influence on his comedy and was sometimes involved. Carlin called himself "fully Irish"; his mother was born in New York to Irish immigrants and his father was an Irish immigrant from Cloghan, County Donegal. In his autobiography Last Words, he wrote about a fantasy of Ireland he often had when his first wife was alive: "The southeastern parts so that it would be a little warmer, and the two of us there, close enough to Dublin that you could go buy things you needed." Carlin's maternal grandfather was a police officer for the New York City Police Department (NYPD) who wrote out the works of William Shakespeare by hand for fun. Carlin's parents separated when he was two months old because his father was an alcoholic, who—according to Carlin—was "never around". His mother raised him and his brother on her own. When Carlin was eight years old, his father died.

Carlin said that he picked up an appreciation for effective use of the English language from his mother, though they had a difficult relationship and he often ran away from home. He grew up at 519 West 121st Street, in Manhattan's Morningside Heights neighborhood, which he and his friends called "White Harlem" because it "sounded a lot tougher than its real name." He attended Corpus Christi School, a Catholic parish school of the Corpus Christi Church in Morningside Heights. One of Carlin's closest childhood friends was Randy Jurgensen, who became one of the most decorated homicide detectives in NYPD history. His mother had a television, which was new at the time, and Carlin became a fan of the pioneering late-night talk show Broadway Open House. He went to Cardinal Hayes High School but was kicked out at age 15, after three semesters. He briefly attended Bishop Dubois High School in Harlem and Salesian High School in Goshen. He spent many summers at Camp Notre Dame in Spofford, New Hampshire, where he regularly won the camp's drama award; upon his death, some of his ashes were scattered at Spofford Lake in accordance with his request.

Carlin idolized Danny Kaye and wanted to become a comedic actor like him. In interviews he spoke of his regret at not attaining this boyhood dream and took on more acting roles towards the end of his life.

Carlin joined the U.S. Air Force and was trained as a radar technician. He was in the 376 Armament and Electronics Squadron stationed at Barksdale Air Force Base in Bossier City, Louisiana, and began working as a DJ at radio station KJOE in nearby Shreveport in July 1954. Called an "unproductive airman" by his superiors, he received a general discharge on July 29, 1957. During his time in the Air Force, he was court-martialed three times and received many nonjudicial punishments and reprimands.

== Career ==
=== 1959–1969: Early work and breakthrough ===
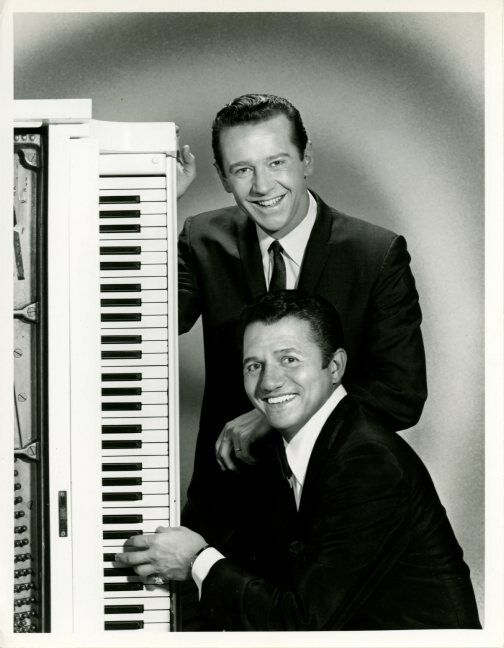
Carlin (standing) with singer Buddy Greco in 1967

In 1959, Carlin met Jack Burns, a fellow DJ at radio station KXOL in Fort Worth, Texas. They formed a comedy team and after successful performances at Fort Worth's beat coffeehouse The Cellar, Burns and Carlin headed for California in February 1960.

Within weeks of arriving in California, Burns and Carlin put together an audition tape and created The Wright Brothers, a morning show on KDAY in Hollywood. During their tenure at KDAY, they honed their material in beatnik coffeehouses at night. Years later, when he was honored with a star on the Hollywood Walk of Fame, Carlin requested that it be placed in front of the KDAY studios near the corner of Sunset Boulevard and Vine Street. Burns and Carlin recorded their only album, Burns and Carlin at the Playboy Club Tonight, in May 1960 at Cosmo Alley in Hollywood. After two years as a team, they parted to pursue individual careers, but "remain[ed] the best of friends".

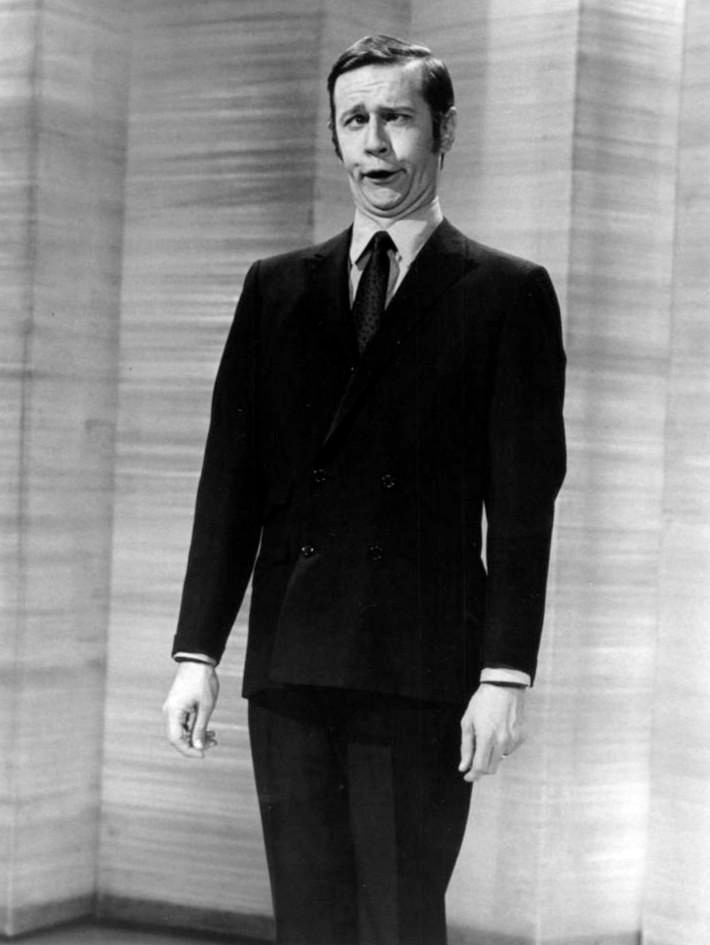
Carlin performing on UK's This Is Tom Jones in 1969

In the 1960s, Carlin began appearing on television variety shows, where he played various characters, including a Native American sergeant, a stupid radio disc jockey, and a hippie weatherman. Variations on these routines appear on his 1967 debut album, Take-Offs and Put-Ons, which was recorded live in 1966 at The Roostertail in Detroit and issued by RCA Victor in 1967. During this period, Carlin appeared on Tonight Starring Jack Paar before becoming a frequent performer and guest host on The Tonight Show Starring Johnny Carson. He was one of Johnny Carson's most frequent substitutes during his three-decade tenure. Carlin was also cast as a co-host alongside Buddy Greco in Away We Go, a 1967 CBS comedy-variety show, which was the summer replacement for The Jackie Gleason Show. His material during his early career and his appearance—he wore suits and had short-cropped hair—was seen as conventional, particularly compared to his later anti-establishment material.

Carlin was present at Lenny Bruce's arrest for obscenity at the Gate of Horn club in Chicago on December 5, 1962. As the police began detaining audience members for questioning, they asked Carlin for identification. After responding that he did not believe in government-issued IDs, Carlin was arrested and taken to jail with Bruce in the same vehicle.

=== 1970–1971: Transformation ===
In the late 1960s, Carlin made about $250,000 annually. In 1970, he changed his routines and his appearance; he grew his hair long, sported a beard and earrings, and typically dressed in T-shirts and blue jeans. He lost some TV bookings by dressing strangely for a comedian at a time when clean-cut, well-dressed comedians were the norm. He hired talent managers Jeff Wald and Ron De Blasio to help him change his image, making him look more "hip" for a younger audience. Wald put Carlin into much smaller clubs such as The Troubadour in West Hollywood and The Bitter End in New York City, and later said that Carlin's income declined by 90% but his later career arc was greatly improved.

=== 1972–1979: Stardom and acclaim ===
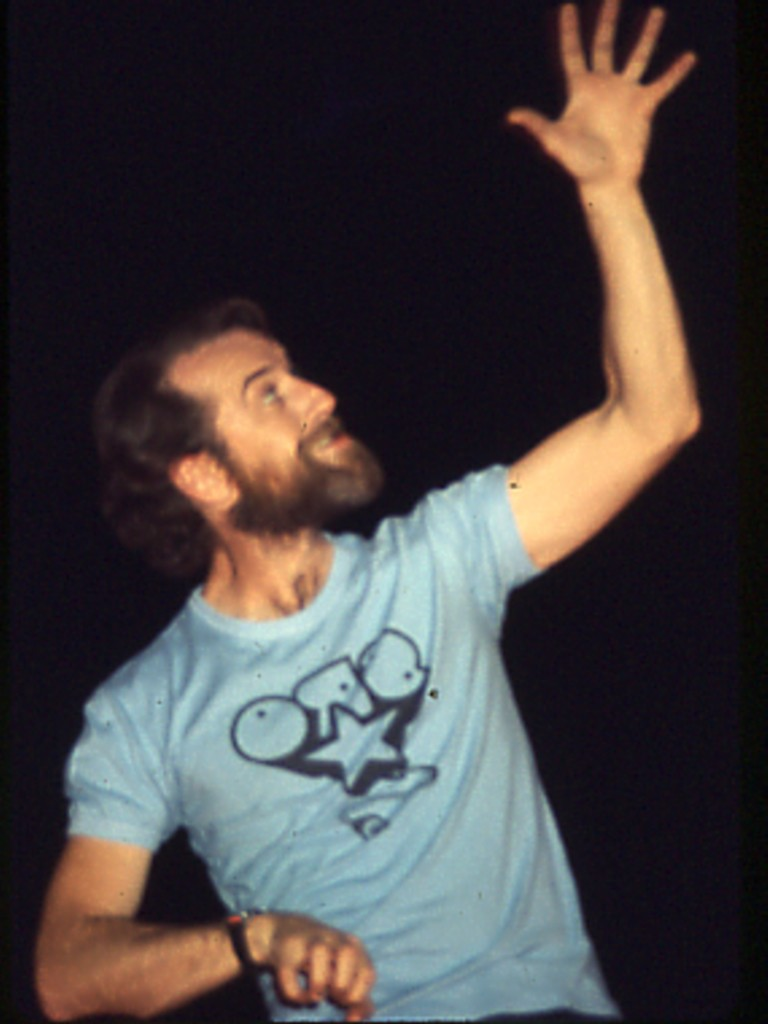
Carlin in the 1970s

In 1970, record producer Monte Kay formed the Little David Records subsidiary of Atlantic Records, with comedian Flip Wilson as co-owner. Kay and Wilson signed Carlin away from RCA Records and recorded a Carlin performance at Washington, D.C.'s Cellar Door in 1971, which was released as the album FM & AM in 1972. De Blasio was busy managing the fast-paced career of Freddie Prinze and was about to sign Richard Pryor, so he released Carlin to Little David general manager Jack Lewis, who, like Carlin, was somewhat wild and rebellious. Using his own persona as a springboard for his new comedy, he was presented by Ed Sullivan in a performance of "The Hair Piece" and quickly regained his popularity as the public caught on to his style.

Starting in 1972, singer-songwriter Kenny Rankin was Carlin's label-mate on Little David Records, and Rankin served many times as Carlin's musical guest or opening act during the early 1970s. The two flew together in Carlin's private jet; Carlin says that Rankin relapsed into using cocaine while on tour since Carlin had so much available. FM & AM proved very popular and marked Carlin's change from mainstream to counterculture comedy. The "AM" side was an extension of Carlin's previous style, with zany but relatively clean routines parodying aspects of American life. The "FM" side introduced Carlin's new style, with references to marijuana and birth control pills, and a playful examination of the word "shit".

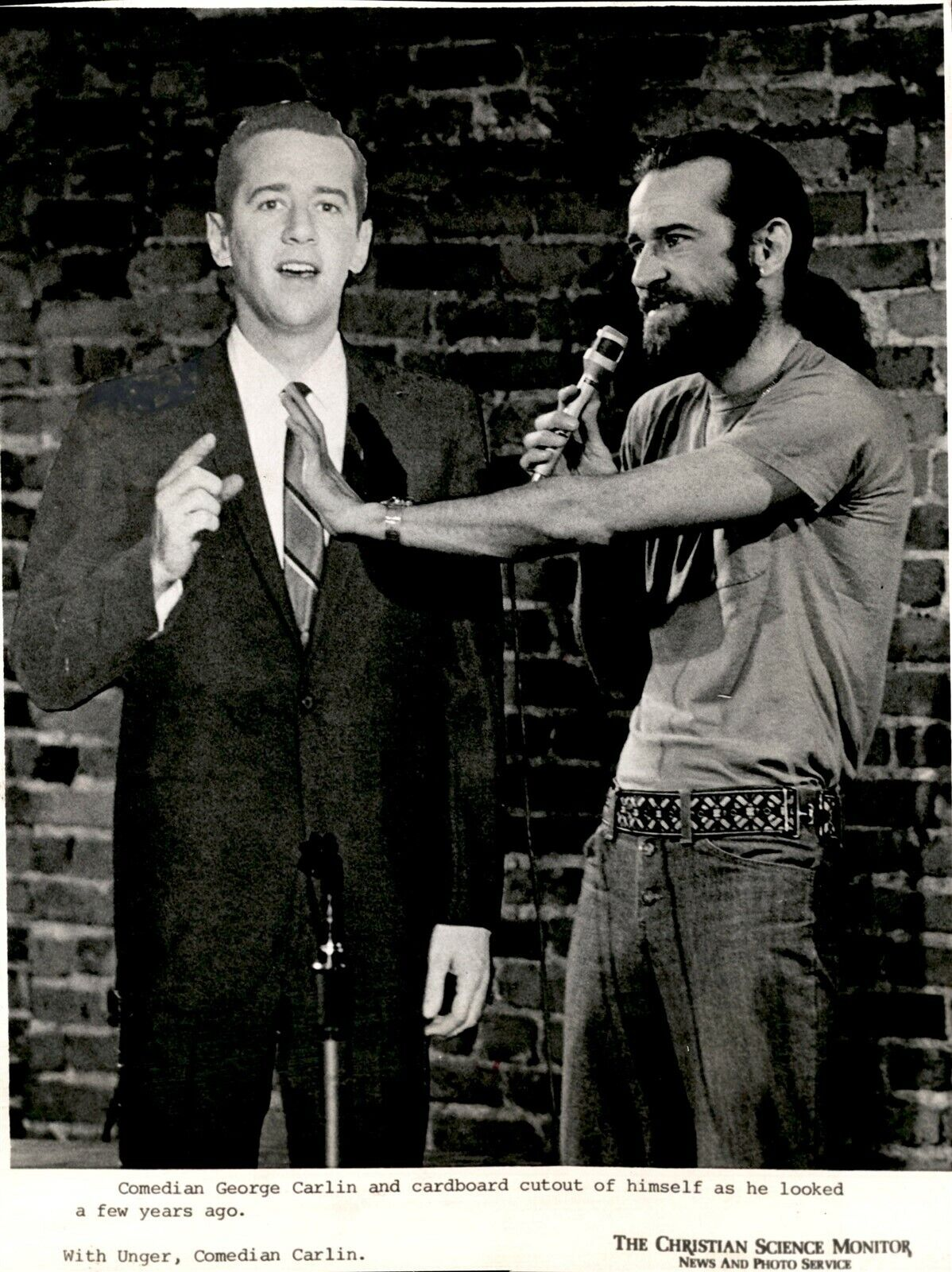
Carlin c. 1973, with a cardboard cutout of himself as he looked in the 1960s

In this period, Carlin perfected his well-known "seven dirty words" routine, which appears on Class Clown as follows: "'Shit', 'piss', 'fuck', 'cunt', 'cocksucker', 'motherfucker', and 'tits'. Those are the heavy seven. Those are the ones that'll infect your soul, curve your spine and keep the country from winning the war." On July 21, 1972, Carlin was arrested after performing the routine at Milwaukee's Summerfest and charged with violating obscenity laws. The case, which prompted Carlin for a time to call the words the "Milwaukee Seven", was dismissed in December when the judge declared that the language was indecent but that Carlin had the freedom to say it as long as he caused no disturbance. In 1973, a man complained to the Federal Communications Commission (FCC) after listening with his son to a similar routine, "Filthy Words", from Carlin's Occupation: Foole, which was broadcast one afternoon on radio station WBAI. The FCC cited Pacifica for violating regulations that prohibit broadcasting "obscene" material. The Supreme Court of the United States upheld the FCC action by a vote of 5 to 4, ruling that the routine was "indecent but not obscene" and that the FCC had authority to prohibit such broadcasts during hours when children were likely to be among the audience.

The controversy increased Carlin's fame. He eventually expanded the "dirty words" theme with a seemingly interminable end to a performance, finishing with his voice fading out in one HBO version and accompanying the credits in the Carlin at Carnegie special for the 1982–83 season, and a set of 49 webpages organized by subject and embracing his "Incomplete List of Impolite Words". On stage, during a rendition of this routine, Carlin learned that his previous comedy album FM & AM had won a Grammy. Midway through the performance on the album Occupation: Foole, he can be heard thanking someone for handing him a piece of paper. He then exclaims "shit!" and proudly announces his win to the audience. Over his career, Carlin was arrested seven times for reciting the "Seven Dirty Words" routine.

Carlin hosted the premiere broadcast of NBC's Saturday Night Live on October 11, 1975. In accordance with his request, he did not appear in its sketches. The next season, 1976–77, he appeared regularly on CBS Television's Tony Orlando & Dawn variety series. Carlin unexpectedly stopped performing regularly in 1976, when his career appeared to be at its height. For the next five years, he rarely performed stand-up, although it was at this time that he began doing specials for HBO as part of its On Location series. Carlin did 14 specials, including 2008's It's Bad for Ya. He later revealed that the first of his three heart attacks occurred during this layoff period. His first two HBO specials aired in 1977 and 1978.

=== 1980–1987: HBO and film ===
In 1981, Carlin returned to the stage, releasing A Place for My Stuff and returning to HBO and New York City with the Carlin at Carnegie TV special, which was filmed at Carnegie Hall and aired during the 1982–83 season. Carlin continued doing HBO specials every year or two over the following decade and a half. All of Carlin's albums from this time forward are from his HBO specials. He hosted SNL for the second time on November 10, 1984, this time appearing in several sketches.

Carlin began to achieve prominence as a film actor with a major supporting role in the 1987 comedy hit Outrageous Fortune, starring Bette Midler and Shelley Long. Playing drifter Frank Madras, he poked fun at the lingering effect of the 1960s counterculture.

=== 1988–1989: Changes in material and tone ===
Beginning in 1988, Carlin evolved and adopted both a new appearance and a new direction. As he did in his first change of direction in the early 1970s, Carlin blended his old and new styles by bringing in politics and disdain for society with nihilist humor while using some of the previous material direction of pointing out the odd things people all do and continued his fascination with language, but with disdain for its current uses by society. This led to darker material and an aggressive tone over the next two decades.

=== 1989–1997: TV series and more films ===
In 1989, he gained popularity with a new generation of teens when he was cast as Rufus, the time-traveling mentor of the title characters in Bill & Ted's Excellent Adventure. He reprised the role in the sequel, Bill & Ted's Bogus Journey (1991), and in the first season of the cartoon series.

In 1991, Carlin had a major supporting role in the film The Prince of Tides, which starred Nick Nolte and Barbra Streisand, as the gay neighbor of the main character's suicidal sister.

That same year, Carlin became the second American narrator of the children's television series Thomas & Friends, narrating the first through the fourth season. He played Mr. Conductor on the PBS show Shining Time Station until 1996, replacing Ringo Starr on both programs. According to Britt Allcroft, who developed both shows, on the first day of the assignment, Carlin was nervous about recording his narration without an audience, so the producers put a stuffed teddy bear in the booth.

Carlin's Jammin' in New York, a new HBO special in 1992, highlighted the directional change he had been honing the last few years. Critics applauded the show and he continued down this path of more serious subjects and nihilistic tone for the remainder of his life. Carlin opined that this show was his favorite.

In 1993, Carlin began a weekly Fox sitcom, The George Carlin Show, playing New York City taxicab driver George O'Grady. The show, created and written by The Simpsons co-creator Sam Simon, ran for 27 episodes, through December 1995. In Last Words, Carlin wrote of The George Carlin Show, "I had a great time. I never laughed so much, so often, so hard as I did with cast members Alex Rocco, Chris Rich, Tony Starke. There was a very strange, very good sense of humor on that stage ... [but] I was incredibly happy when the show was canceled. I was frustrated that it had taken me away from my true work." Carlin was honored at the 1997 Aspen Comedy Festival with a retrospective, George Carlin: 40 Years of Comedy, hosted by Jon Stewart. His first hardcover book, Brain Droppings (1997), sold nearly 900,000 copies and spent 40 weeks on the New York Times best-seller list.

=== 2000–2008: Final HBO specials ===
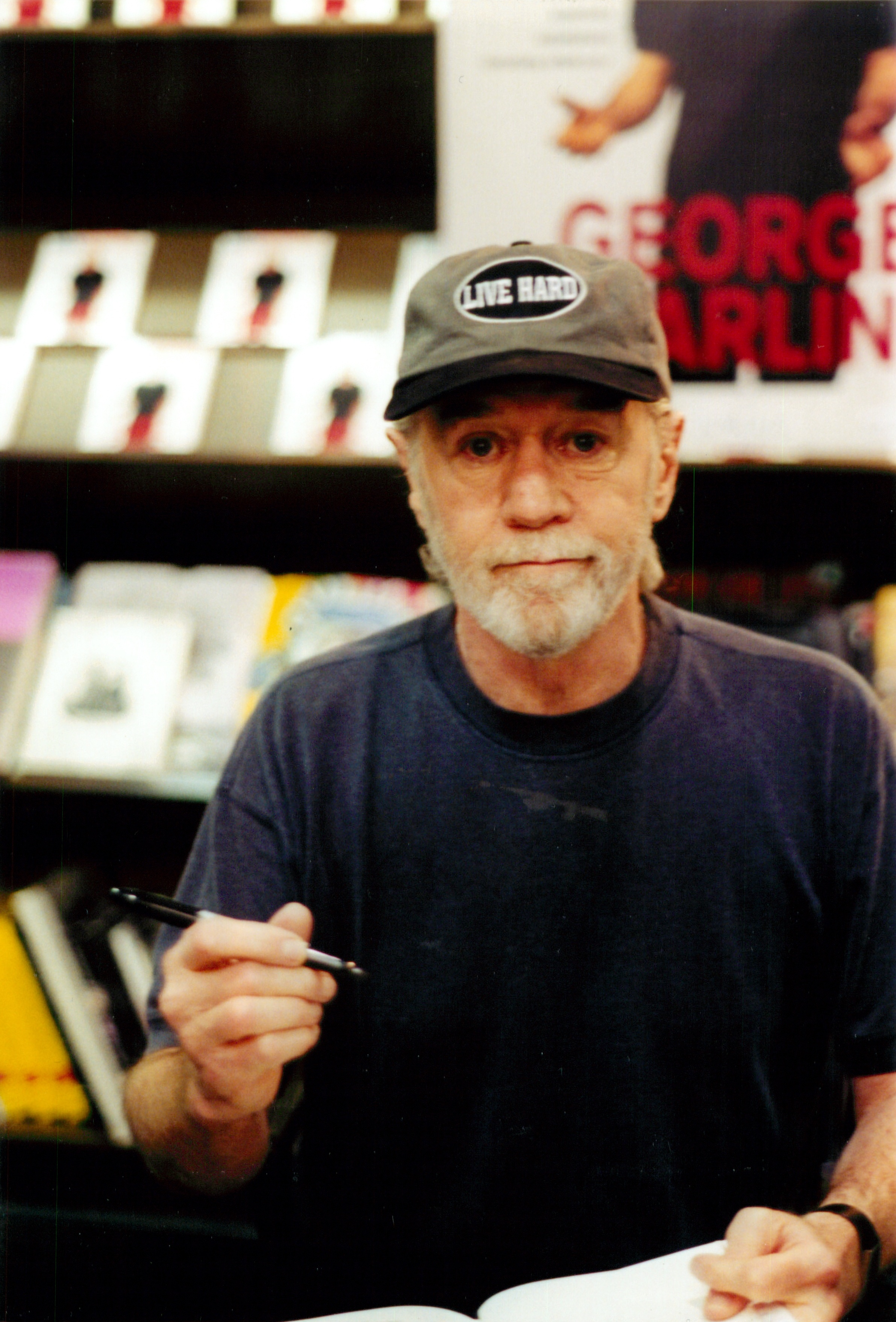
Carlin at a book signing for Brain Droppings in 2004

Carlin later said that there were other, more pragmatic reasons for abandoning his acting career in favor of standup. In an interview for Esquire magazine in 2001, he said, "Because of my abuse of drugs, I neglected my business affairs and had large arrears with the IRS, and that took me eighteen to twenty years to dig out of. I did it honorably, and I don't begrudge them. I don't hate paying taxes, and I'm not angry at anyone, because I was complicit in it. But I'll tell you what it did for me: it made me a way better comedian. Because I had to stay out on the road and I couldn't pursue that movie career, which would have gone nowhere, and I became a really good comic and a really good writer."

In 2001, Carlin was given a Lifetime Achievement Award at the 15th Annual American Comedy Awards. In 2003, Representative Doug Ose introduced a bill (H.R. 3687) to outlaw the broadcast of Carlin's "seven dirty words", including "compound use (including hyphenated compounds) of such words and phrases with each other or with other words or phrases, and other grammatical forms of such words and phrases (including verb, adjective, gerund, participle, and infinitive forms)". The bill omitted "tits", but included "asshole", not one of Carlin's original seven words. It was referred to the House Judiciary Subcommittee on the Constitution in 2004 and was tabled.

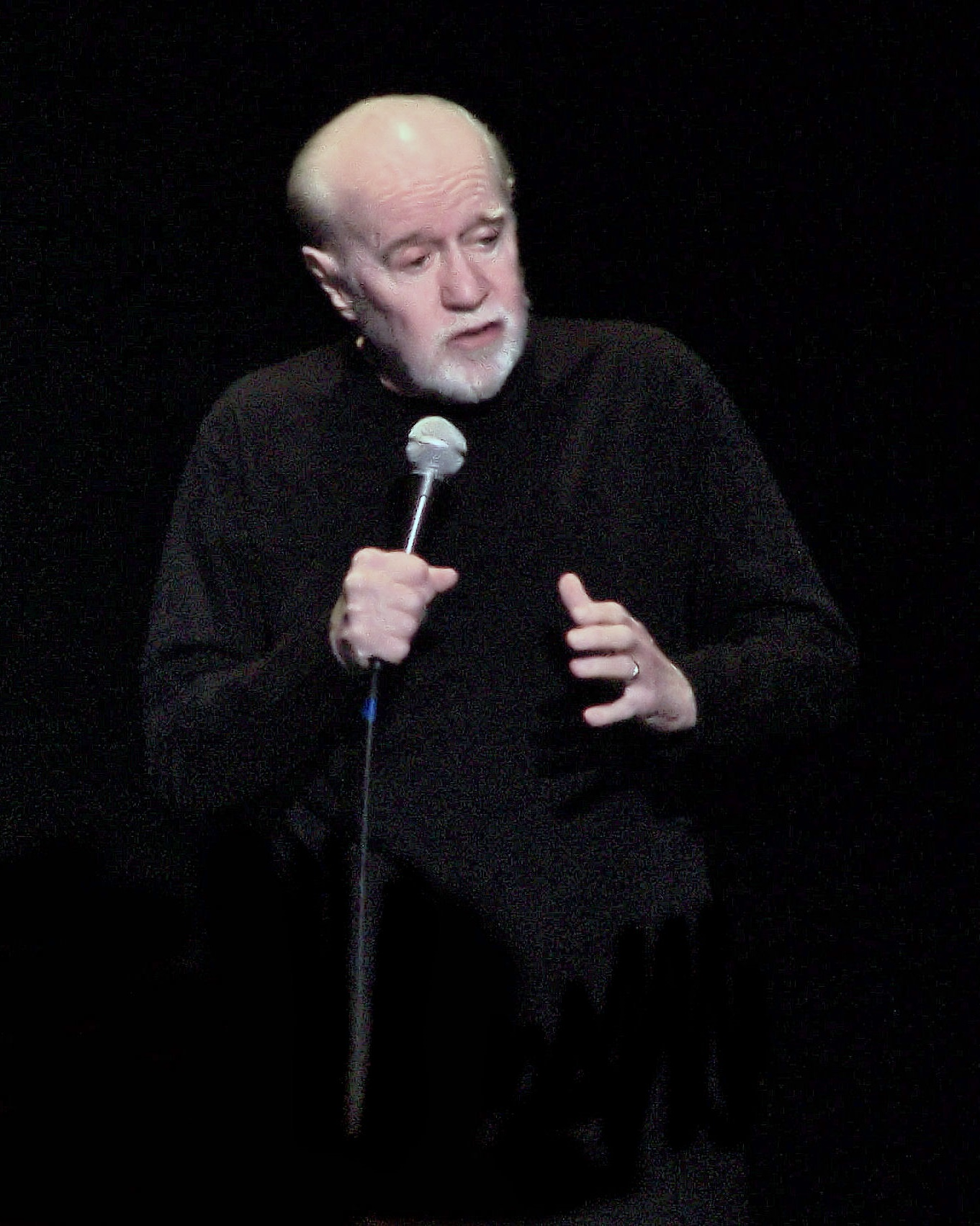
Carlin in April 2008

Carlin performed regularly as a headliner in Las Vegas, but in December 2004, his run at the MGM Grand Las Vegas was terminated after an altercation with his audience. After a poorly received set filled with dark references to suicide bombings and beheadings, Carlin complained that he could not wait to get out of "this fucking hotel" and Las Vegas; he wanted to go back east, he said, "where the real people are". He continued: "People who go to Las Vegas, you've got to question their fucking intellect to start with. Traveling hundreds and thousands of miles to essentially give your money to a large corporation is kind of fucking moronic. That's what I'm always getting here is these kind of fucking people with very limited intellects." An audience member shouted, "Stop degrading us!" Carlin responded, "Thank you very much, whatever that was. I hope it was positive; if not, well, blow me." He was immediately fired, and soon thereafter his representative announced that he would begin treatment for alcohol and prescription painkiller addiction on his own initiative.

After his 13th HBO special on November 5, 2005, Life Is Worth Losing, Carlin toured his new material through the first half of 2006. Topics included suicide, natural disasters, cannibalism, genocide, human sacrifice, threats to civil liberties in the U.S., and his theory that humans are inferior to other animals. In the 2006 Pixar animated film Cars, Carlin voiced Fillmore, an anti-establishment hippie VW Microbus with a psychedelic paint job and the license plate "51237" (Carlin's birthday in m/dd/yy format). In 2007, he voiced the wizard in Happily N'Ever After, his last film.

Carlin's last HBO stand-up special, It's Bad for Ya, aired live on March 1, 2008, from the Wells Fargo Center for the Arts in Santa Rosa, California. Themes included "American bullshit", rights, death, old age, and child-rearing. He repeated the theme to his audience several times throughout the show: "It's all bullshit, and it's bad for ya".

== Personal life ==
In August 1960, while touring with comedy partner Jack Burns in Dayton, Ohio, Carlin stopped at a roadside diner, where he met waitress Brenda Hosbrook. They began dating and were married at her parents' home in Dayton on June 3, 1961. Their only child, Kelly Marie Carlin, was born June 15, 1963, and would later become a radio host. Carlin and Hosbrook renewed their wedding vows in Las Vegas in 1971.

Their marriage was often marred by his cocaine use and her alcoholism, the latter of which worsened when Carlin's mother came to stay with them and would secretly pour Hosbrook drinks while derogating him. When Hosbrook was hospitalized due to her drinking, she told Carlin that she would not return home if his mother was there. He immediately went home, booked his mother a flight to New York, and took her to the airport. The couple soon addressed their addiction issues; the marriage improved so much that Kelly later said it felt like it had been rebooted. Hosbrook died of liver cancer on May 11, 1997, one day before her husband's 60th birthday.

Carlin met comedy writer Sally Wade six months after Brenda's death and said it was "love at first sight", but told her he was hesitant to act on his feelings so soon after being widowed. He discussed needing to be alone, potentially for up to a year, before being ready to date again. They had no contact for eight months and she assumed he had moved on, but then he called to ask her out. They wed in a private, unregistered ceremony on June 24, 1998, and remained married until Carlin's death.

In 2008, Carlin said that using cannabis, LSD, and mescaline had helped him cope with life. He also said several times that he had battled addiction to alcohol, cocaine, and Vicodin, and spent some time in a rehab facility in 2004. During the taping of his stand-up special Life Is Worth Losing on November 5, 2005, he said he had been sober for 341 days.

After being raised as a Catholic, Carlin outspokenly rejected religion, frequently criticizing and mocking it in his routines. When asked if he believed in God, his response was, "No, there's no God—but there might be some sort of an organizing intelligence, and I think to understand it is way beyond our ability."

== Death ==
Carlin had a history of heart problems, including heart attacks in 1978, 1982, and 1991. He also had an arrhythmia requiring an ablation procedure in 2003, a significant episode of heart failure in 2005, and two angioplasties on undisclosed dates. In the 2022 documentary George Carlin's American Dream, Jerry Hamza—Carlin's manager from 1980 until his death—said Carlin underwent many heart surgeries in a short period toward the end of his life. Carlin's publicist Jeff Abraham said that he once lifted his shirt after coming to a gig from the hospital to show Abraham his torso, whereupon Abraham said it looked like a science project.

On June 22, 2008, at age 71, Carlin died from heart failure at Saint John's Health Center in Santa Monica, California. His death occurred one week after his final performance at The Orleans Hotel and Casino. In accordance with his wishes, his body was cremated and his ashes scattered in front of various New York City nightclubs and over Spofford Lake in New Hampshire, where he had attended summer camp as an adolescent. His will stated that there was to be no funeral and that he wished only for his widow and daughter to host a small gathering at his home for loved ones to share stories of him.

== Legacy ==
=== Awards and honors ===
Along with numerous other accolades, Carlin won five Grammy Awards and was nominated for six Primetime Emmy Awards and two Daytime Emmy Awards. He received a star on the Hollywood Walk of Fame in January 1987, and was a recipient of the John F. Kennedy Center for the Performing Arts's Mark Twain Prize for American Humor in 2008.

=== Influences ===
Carlin's influences included Danny Kaye, Jonathan Winters, Lenny Bruce, Richard Pryor, Nichols and May, Jerry Lewis, the Marx Brothers, Mort Sahl, Spike Jones, Ernie Kovacs, and the Ritz Brothers. His daughter Kelly said in 2022 that he took more acting roles in the latter half of his career because he "never gave up on the Danny Kaye dream".

Comedians who have claimed Carlin as an influence include Adam Ferrara, Bill Burr, Chris Rock, Jerry Seinfeld, Louis C.K., Lewis Black, Jon Stewart, Stephen Colbert, Bill Maher, Liz Miele, Patrice O'Neal, Colin Quinn, Steven Wright, Mitch Hedberg, Russell Peters, Bo Burnham, Jay Leno, Ben Stiller, Kevin Smith, Chris Rush, Rob McElhenney, and Jim Jefferies.

=== The Carlin Warning ===
After Carlin's seven dirty words routine and subsequent FCC v. Pacifica Foundation Supreme Court ruling in 1978, broadcasters started to use the "Carlin Warning" to remind performers of the words they could not say during a live performance.

=== Tributes ===
George Carlin Way in Manhattan

Upon Carlin's death in 2008, HBO broadcast 11 of his 14 HBO specials from June 25 to 28, including a 12-hour marathon block on the HBO Comedy channel. NBC scheduled a rerun of the first episode of Saturday Night Live, which Carlin hosted. Both Sirius Satellite Radio's "Raw Dog Comedy" and XM Satellite Radio's "XM Comedy" channels ran a memorial marathon of Carlin recordings the day after he died. Sirius XM Satellite Radio has since devoted an entire channel to Carlin, Carlin's Corner, featuring all his comedy albums, live concerts, and works from his private archives. Larry King devoted his June 23 show to a Carlin tribute, featuring interviews with Jerry Seinfeld, Bill Maher, Roseanne Barr, Lewis Black, Carlin's brother, Patrick Jr., and his daughter, Kelly. On June 24, The New York Times printed an op-ed piece on Carlin by Jerry Seinfeld. Cartoonist Garry Trudeau paid tribute in his Doonesbury comic strip on July 27.

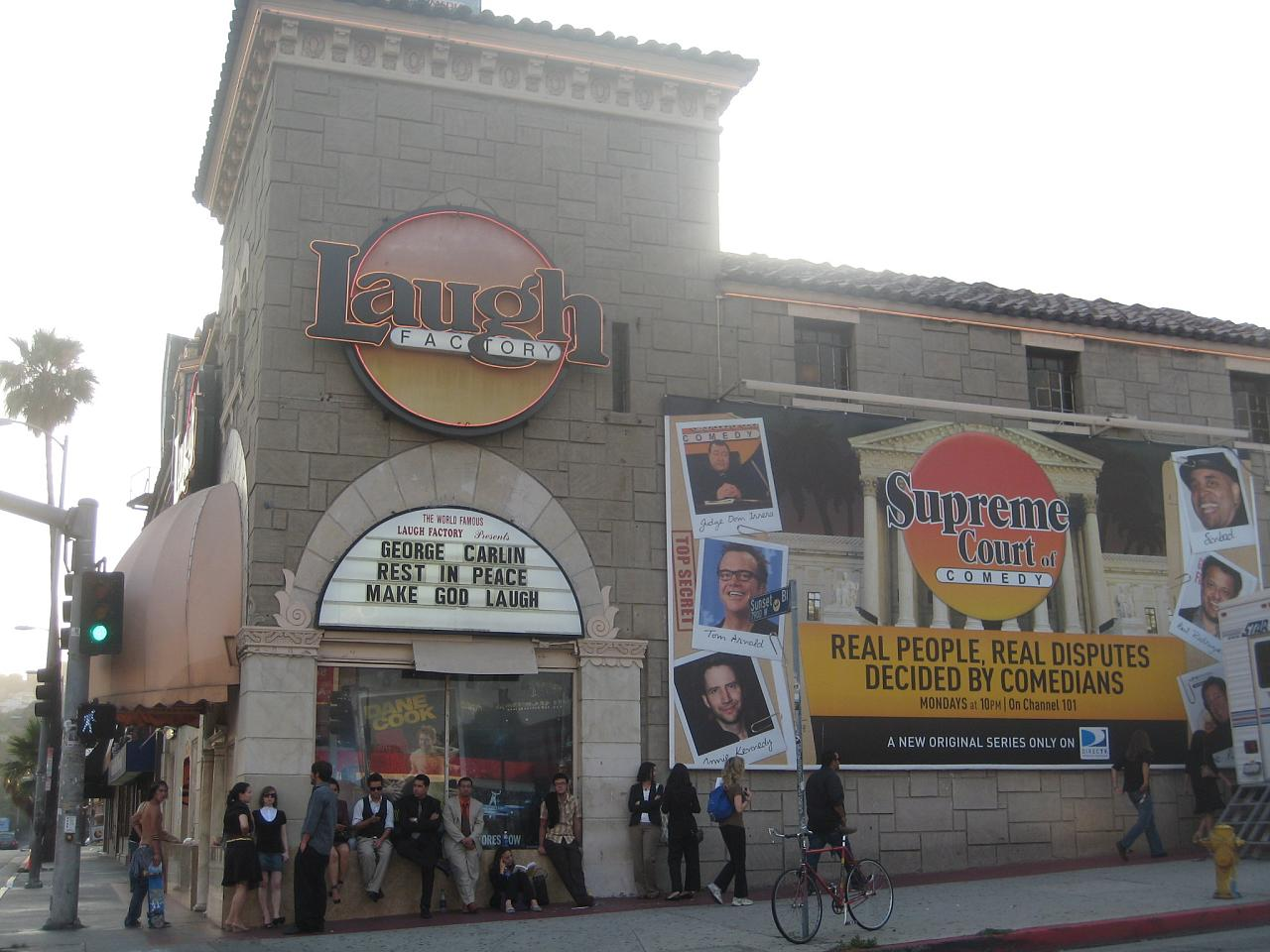
A dedication from the Laugh Factory two days after Carlin died

Four days before Carlin's death, the John F. Kennedy Center for the Performing Arts named him its 2008 Mark Twain Prize for American Humor honoree. He became its first posthumous recipient on November 10, 2008. Comedians honoring him at the ceremony included Jon Stewart, Bill Maher, Lily Tomlin (a past winner of the prize), Lewis Black, Denis Leary, Joan Rivers, and Margaret Cho. Louis C.K. dedicated his stand-up special Chewed Up to Carlin, while Lewis Black dedicated the second season of Root of All Evil to him.

For years, Carlin had been compiling and writing his autobiography, to be released in conjunction with a one-man Broadway show tentatively titled New York Boy. After his death, his collaborator on both projects Tony Hendra edited the autobiography for release as Last Words. The book, chronicling most of Carlin's life and future plans including the one-man show, was published in 2009. The abridged audio edition is narrated by Carlin's brother Patrick Jr. In 2011, Carlin's widow Sally Wade published The George Carlin Letters: The Permanent Courtship of Sally Wade, a collection of previously unpublished writings and artwork by Carlin interwoven with Wade's chronicle of their decade together. The subtitle is a phrase on a handwritten note that Wade found next to her computer upon returning home from the hospital after his death. In 2008, Kelly Carlin announced plans to publish an "oral history", a collection of stories from Carlin's friends and family. She later said the project had been shelved in favor of completion of her own project, an autobiographical one-woman show called A Carlin Home Companion: Growing Up with George.

On October 22, 2014, part of West 121st Street in Morningside Heights was renamed "George Carlin Way". Moneyball screenwriter Stan Chervin announced in 2018 that a biopic of Carlin was being written.

George Carlin's American Dream, a documentary about Carlin's life, was released on HBO Max on May 20, 2022. It is directed by Judd Apatow and Michael Bonfiglio, and produced by Carlin's daughter Kelly. In a Netflix stand-up special released in 2022, The Hall: Honoring the Greats of Stand-Up, Carlin was inducted into the National Comedy Center in Jamestown, New York.

== Internet hoaxes ==
Many quotations have been falsely attributed to Carlin, including various joke lists, rants, and other pieces. The website Snopes, which debunks urban legends and myths, has addressed these hoaxes. Many of them contain material that runs counter to Carlin's viewpoints; some are especially hostile toward racial groups, gay people, women, the homeless, and other targets. Carlin was aware of this and debunked the quotes, writing on his website, "Here's a rule of thumb, folks: nothing you see on the Internet is mine unless it comes from one of my albums, books, HBO specials, or appeared on my website. [...] It bothers me that some people might believe that I would be capable of writing some of this stuff."

In 2011, "Weird Al" Yankovic referenced the hoaxes in his song "Stop Forwarding That Crap to Me" with the lyric, "And by the way, your quotes from George Carlin aren't really George Carlin."

== Filmography ==
=== Film ===
Year	Title	Role	Notes
1968	With Six You Get Eggroll	Herbie Fleck	
1976	Car Wash	Taxi Driver	
1979	Americathon	Narrator	
1987	Outrageous Fortune	Frank Madras	
1989	Bill & Ted's Excellent Adventure	Rufus	
1991	Bill & Ted's Bogus Journey	Rufus	
1991	The Prince of Tides	Eddie Detreville	
1999	Dogma	Cardinal Ignatius Glick	
2001	Jay and Silent Bob Strike Back	Hitchhiker	
2003	Scary Movie 3	Architect	
2004	Jersey Girl	Bart Trinké	
2005	The Aristocrats	Himself	Documentary
2005	Tarzan II	Zugor	Voice
2006	Cars	Fillmore	Voice
2006	Happily N'Ever After	Wizard	Voice, final film role
2020	Bill & Ted Face the Music	Rufus	Posthumous release; archival footage

=== Television ===
Year	Title	Role	Notes
1962	Tonight Starring Jack Paar	Self	3 episodes
1963–1992	The Tonight Show Starring Johnny Carson	Self	108 episodes
1965–1978	The Mike Douglas Show	Self	29 episodes
1965–1981	The Merv Griffin Show	Self	30 episodes
1966	The Jimmy Dean Show	Self	2 episodes
1966	The Kraft Summer Music Hall	Self	12 episodes; also writer
1966	That Girl	George Lester	Episode: "Break a Leg"
1966–1967	The Hollywood Palace	Self	4 episodes
1967–1971	The Ed Sullivan Show	Self	11 episodes
1968	The Smothers Brothers Comedy Hour	Self	1 episode
1969	What's My Line?	Self	1 episode
1970	The Game Game	Self	2 episodes
1969; 1978	The Carol Burnett Show	Self	2 episodes
1971–1973	The Flip Wilson Show	Self	6 episodes; also writer
1977	Welcome Back, Kotter	Wally 'The Wow' Wexler	Episode: "Radio Free Freddie"
1975, 1984	Saturday Night Live	Host	Episodes: 1 and 183
1984–1992	Late Night with David Letterman	Himself	9 episodes
1985	Apt. 2C	Fictionalized version of himself, Jesus Christ	Pilot episode produced for HBO
1987	Nick at Nite	—N/a	
1988	Justin Case	Justin Case	TV movie directed Blake Edwards
1990	Working Tra$h	Ralph Sawatzky	Television film
1990	Bill & Ted's Excellent Adventures	Rufus	Voice, season 1 only
1991–1995	Thomas & Friends	Narrator	Series 1–4; Voice, US dub; 104 episodes
1991–1993	Shining Time Station	Mr. Conductor, narrator	45 episodes
1992–2006	The Tonight Show with Jay Leno	Himself	13 episodes
1994–1995	The George Carlin Show	George O'Grady	27 episodes
1994–2001	Late Show with David Letterman	Himself	8 episodes
1995	Shining Time Station: Once Upon a Time	Mr. Conductor	Television film
1995	Shining Time Station: Second Chances	Mr. Conductor	Television film
1995	Shining Time Station: One of the Family	Mr. Conductor	Television film
1995	Streets of Laredo	Billy Williams	3 episodes
1995	Shining Time Station: Queen for a Day	Mr. Conductor	Television film
1996	Mr. Conductor's Thomas Tales	Mr. Conductor, narrator	6 episodes
1996–2001	Late Night with Conan O'Brien	Himself	3 episodes
1998	The Simpsons	Munchie	Voice, episode: "D'oh-in' in the Wind"
1999	Storytime with Thomas	Narrator	3 episodes
1999, 2004	The Daily Show	Himself	3 episodes
2000	MADtv	Mr. Conductor	Episodes: 518 & 524
2004	Inside the Actors Studio	Himself	1 episode
2004–2005	Real Time with Bill Maher	Himself	3 episodes
2009	Cars Toons: Mater's Tall Tales	Fillmore	Posthumous release; archival voice recordings, episode: "Unidentified Flying Mater"

=== Video games ===
Year	Title	Role
2006	Cars	Fillmore

== Discography ==
=== Records ===
Main

- 1963: Burns and Carlin at the Playboy Club Tonight
- 1967: Take-Offs and Put-Ons
- 1972: FM & AM
- 1972: Class Clown
- 1973: Occupation: Foole
- 1974: Toledo Window Box
- 1975: An Evening with Wally Londo Featuring Bill Slaszo
- 1977: On the Road
- 1981: A Place for My Stuff
- 1984: Carlin on Campus
- 1986: Playin' with Your Head
- 1988: What Am I Doing in New Jersey?
- 1990: Parental Advisory: Explicit Lyrics
- 1992: Jammin' in New York
- 1996: Back in Town
- 1999: You Are All Diseased
- 2001: Complaints and Grievances
- 2006: Life Is Worth Losing
- 2008: It's Bad for Ya
- 2016: I Kinda Like It When a Lotta People Die

Compilations

- 1978: Indecent Exposure: Some of the Best of George Carlin
- 1984: The George Carlin Collection
- 1992: Classic Gold
- 1999: The Little David Years

=== HBO specials ===
Special	Year	Notes
On Location: George Carlin at USC	1977	
George Carlin: Again!	1978	
Carlin at Carnegie	1982	
Carlin on Campus	1984	
Playin' with Your Head	1986	
What Am I Doing in New Jersey?	1988	
Doin' It Again	1990	
Jammin' in New York	1992	
Back in Town	1996	
George Carlin: 40 Years of Comedy	1997	
You Are All Diseased	1999	
Complaints and Grievances	2001	
Life Is Worth Losing	2005	
All My Stuff	2007	A box set of Carlin's first 12 stand-up specials (excluding George Carlin: 40 Years of Comedy).
It's Bad for Ya	2008	
Commemorative Collection	2018	

== Written works ==
Book	Year	Notes
Sometimes a Little Brain Damage Can Help	1984	ISBN 0-89471-271-3
Brain Droppings	1997	ISBN 0-7868-8321-9
Napalm and Silly Putty	2001	ISBN 0-7868-8758-3
When Will Jesus Bring the Pork Chops?	2004	ISBN 1-4013-0134-7
Three Times Carlin: An Orgy of George	2006	ISBN 978-1-4013-0243-6 A collection of the three previous titles.
Last Words	2009	ISBN 1-4391-7295-1 Posthumous release.

Audiobooks

- Brain Droppings
- Napalm and Silly Putty
- More Napalm & Silly Putty
- George Carlin Reads to You (Compilation of Brain Droppings, Napalm and Silly Putty, and More Napalm & Silly Putty)
- When Will Jesus Bring the Pork Chops?

== See also ==
- Counterculture of the 1960s
