= Young Comedians Special =

Television series

- Starring: Various
- Country of origin: United States
- No. of episodes: 16

Production
- Running time: 60 minutes

Original release
- Network: HBO
- Release: May 14, 1976 – December 9, 1992
- Release: March 25 – March 25, 1995

Young Comedians Special (also known as Young Comedians Show) is the name of a series of annual standup comedy specials that aired on HBO from 1976 to 1992, with one final installment debuting in 1995. The specials began as installments of HBO's standup special series On Location for the first few airings, with comedian Freddie Prinze hosting the first installment. Each special is a showcase format spotlighting several new young comedians, hosted by an established star. HBO's Young Comedians Specials introduced audiences to many now-famous comedians, including Robin Williams, Jerry Seinfeld, Ray Romano, Jay Leno, Jon Stewart, Ellen DeGeneres, Sam Kinison, David Spade, Judd Apatow, Drew Carey, Andy Kaufman, and Paul Reubens's character Pee-Wee Herman. The series was discontinued after the 1995 edition.

== List of specials ==
Year	Title	Host	Featured Comedians	Director	Filming Location	Notes
May 14, 1976	On Location: Freddie Prinze and Friends	Freddie Prinze	Elayne Boosler, Jay Leno, Gary Mule Deer, Bob Shaw, Tim Thomerson	Arthur Forrest	The Comedy Store - Los Angeles, CA	
September 24, 1977	On Location: The 2nd Annual HBO Young Comedians Show	David Steinberg	Ed Bluestone, MacIntyre Dixon, Gallagher, Andy Kaufman, Richard Libertini, Robin Williams	Marty Callner	The Improv - Los Angeles, CA	
August 18, 1978	On Location: Chevy Chase & Friends	Chevy Chase	Richard Belzer, Irv Burton, Bill Kirchenbauer, Denny Johnston	Marty Callner	The Comedy Store - Los Angeles, CA	
December 17, 1979	On Location: Young Comedians Show	Victor Borge	Mike Binder, Mike Davis, Darrow Igus, Rick & Ruby, Robert Wuhl	Marty Callner	The Comedy Store - Los Angeles, CA	
December 26, 1980	The Fifth Annual Young Comedians Show	Carl Reiner	Charles Fleischer, Dale Gonyea, Joe Nipote, Paul Reubens (as Pee-Wee Herman), Tim Thomerson	Marty Callner	The Comedy Store - Los Angeles, CA	
December 11, 1981	The 6th Annual Young Comedians	The Smothers Brothers	Harry Anderson, Monty Jordan, Richard Lewis, Howie Mandel, Maureen Murphy, Rick Overton, Jerry Seinfeld	Marty Callner	The Roxy - Los Angeles, CA	
December 18, 1982	The Seventh Annual Young Comedians Show	Alan King	Larry Amoros, The Funny Boys (Jonathan Schmock and Jim Vallely), The High Heeled Women (Tracey Berg, Cassandra Danz, Mary Fulham, Arleen Sorkin), Monty Jordan, Mike MacDonald, J.J. Wall, Steven Wright	Allan A. Goldstein	Catch a Rising Star - New York, NY	
December 16, 1983	The Eighth Annual Young Comedians Show	John Candy	The Amazing Johnathan, Joel Hodgson, Carol Leifer, Bill Maher, Paula Poundstone, Slap Happy (Allan Jacobs, Jan Kirshner, Brian O'Connor), Steve Sweeney	Paul Miller	Unitel Video, Inc. - New York, NY	
August 3, 1985	The 9th Annual Young Comedians Special	Rodney Dangerfield	Louie Anderson, Harry Basil, Richie Gold, Sam Kinison, Maurice LaMarche, Bob Nelson, Rita Rudner, Bob Saget, Yakov Smirnoff	Walter C. Miller	Dangerfield's - New York, NY	
November 15, 1986	The Young Comedians All-Star Reunion	Harry Anderson, Richard Belzer, Howie Mandel, Steven Wright, Robin Williams	Howard Busgang, Barry Crimmins, Ellen DeGeneres, Jake Johannsen, John Mendoza	Walter C. Miller	The Punchline - San Francisco, CA; Stitches Comedy Club - Boston, MA; Yuk Yuk's - Toronto, Canada; The Comic Strip - New York, NY; The Improv - Los Angeles, CA	This year featured a change of format, with five Young Comedians from the past returning to host. Each was in a different city, introducing a different young comedian.
October 10, 1987	The 11th Annual Young Comedians Special	John Larroquette	Geoff Bolt, Rick Ducommun, Allan Havey, Bobby Slayton, Margaret Smith	Rocco Urbisci	The Improv - Irvine, CA	
September 17, 1988	The 12th Annual Young Comedians Special	Paul Rodriguez	Heywood Banks, Paul Dillery, Richard Jeni, Cathy Ladman, Rick Reynolds	Bruce Gowers	Storyville Jazz Club - New Orleans, LA	
December 2, 1989	The 13th Annual Young Comedians Special	Dennis Miller	Jann Karam, Drake Sather, Rob Schneider, David Spade, Fred Stoller, Warren Thomas	Ellen Brown	The Second City - Chicago, IL	
December 14, 1991	The 14th Annual Young Comedians Special	Richard Lewis	Drew Carey, Anthony Griffith, Warren Hutcherson, Jon Stewart, Jeff Stilson	Bruce Gowers	Great American Music Hall - San Francisco, CA	
December 19, 1992	The 15th Annual Young Comedians Special	Dana Carvey	Judd Apatow, Bill Bellamy, Nick Di Paolo, Janeane Garofalo, Andy Kindler, Ray Romano	Paul Miller	The Improv - Tempe, AZ	
March 25, 1995	1995 Young Comedians Special	Garry Shandling	Dave Attell, Louis C.K., Dave Chappelle, Anthony Clark, Eric Tunney	Louis J. Horvitz	U.S. Comedy Arts Festival - Wheeler Theater - Aspen, CO	
