= Dingleberry =

Dingleberry may refer to:

- Vaccinium erythrocarpum, species of cranberry-producing shrub
- Dingleberry Lake, lake in California, U.S.
- Dingleberry, an alternate name for the Final Fantasy creature Tonberry used in Final Fantasy V
