= On Location (TV series) =

Television series

- HBO On Location
- Starring: Various
- Country of origin: United States

Production
- Running time: Varies

Original release
- Network: HBO
- Release: 1976

On Location is a series from HBO. The series premiered on New Year's Eve 1975 with a one-hour performance by Robert Klein and became a source for uncensored stand-up comedy performances from performers such as George Carlin, David Brenner, Redd Foxx, Rich Little, Robin Williams, Phyllis Diller, Buddy Hackett, Billy Crystal, Pat Cooper and others. In addition to showing select comedians, On Location featured comedy shows such as the annual Young Comedians Show and comedy club shows. From 1982 to 1986, a version of the "HBO In Space" program opening sequence was used to introduce the series.

== Partial list of specials ==
Title	Premiere
Robert Klein: An Evening with Robert Klein	December 31, 1975
David Steinberg	March 20, 1976
On Location Rodney Dangerfield	April 09, 1976
Freddie Prinze & Friends	May 14, 1976
Mort Sahl	July 5, 1976
David Brenner	September 10, 1976
Myron Cohen	October 16, 1976
Steve Martin	November 19, 1976
Henny Youngman	December 10, 1976
John Byner	January 20, 1977
Pat Cooper	February 18, 1977
Phyllis Diller	March 11, 1977
George Carlin: George Carlin at USC	April 8, 1977
Jackie Gayle	May 20, 1977
Robert Klein Revisited	June 17, 1977
Shelley Berman	July 15, 1977
Norm Crosby	August 20, 1977
Soupy Sales	October 22, 1977
Frank Gorshin	November 18, 1977
Shecky Greene	December 16, 1977
George Kirby	January 6, 1978
Jackie Mason On Location	February 17, 1978
Myron Cohen Revisited	March 10, 1978
The Catskill Comedians feat. Joey Bishop	April 7, 1978
David Brenner Returns	May 26, 1978
Redd Foxx	July 14, 1978
Chevy Chase & Friends	August 18, 1978
George Carlin: Again!	September 8, 1978
Robin Williams: "Off the Wall"	October 27, 1978
Alan King	November 24, 1978
Martin Mull	April 27, 1979
Rich Little and the Great Pretenders	July 13, 1979
Billy Crystal	October 27, 1979
George Segal's "Best Bets"	January 18, 1980
The Best of 'On Location' feat. Robert Klein	August 9, 1980
Don Rickles and His Wise Guys	September 19, 1980
The 2nd Annual Rich Little and the Great Pretenders	November 7, 1980
The Pee-wee Herman Show	September 11, 1981
The 3rd Annual Rich Little and the Great Pretenders	October 23, 1981
Robert Klein at Yale	May 24, 1982
Rich Little	September 17, 1982
Catch a Rising Star's 10th Anniversary	September 30, 1982
Carlin at Carnegie	January 8, 1983
An Evening with Robin Williams	March 12, 1983
Campus Comedy feat. Joe Piscopo & a performance by Jeff Dunham	June 11, 1983
Buddy Hackett: "Live and Uncensored"	June 18, 1983
The Comedy Store's 11th Anniversary Show	July 17, 1983
Eddie Murphy Delirious	October 15, 1983
Billy Crystal: A Comic’s Line	February 10, 1984
George Carlin: Carlin on Campus	June 22, 1984
Rich Little: Come Laugh With Me	July 29, 1984
Robert Klein: Child of the 50's, Man of the 80's	August 24, 1984
The Joe Piscopo Special	September 22, 1984
A Steven Wright Special	September 7, 1985
Rich Little & a Night of 42 Stars	November 16, 1985
Buddy Hackett II: On Stage at Caesar's Atlantic City	February 15, 1986
Richard Belzer in Concert	April 5, 1986
Howie Mandel: North American Watusi Tour	May 10, 1986
George Carlin: Playin' with Your Head	June 14, 1986
Robert Klein on Broadway	July 26, 1986
Billy Crystal: Don't Get Me Started	August 9, 1986
Rodney Dangerfield: "It's Not Easy Bein' Me"	September 06, 1986
Robin Williams: An Evening at the Met	October 11, 1986
Paul Rodriguez Live!: "I Need the Couch""	January 24, 1987
An Evening with Bobcat Goldthwait: Share the Warmth	February 21, 1987
Emo Philips Live! At the Hasty Pudding Theatre	March 28, 1987
Sam Kinison: Breaking the Rules	April 21, 1987
Uptown Comedy Express feat. Arsenio Hall, Chris Rock, Barry Sobel, Robert Townsend, and Marsha Warfield	May 9, 1987
An Evening of Alan King at Carnegie Hall	June 9, 1987
Women of the Night feat. Martin Short	July 11, 1987
Jerry Seinfeld: "Stand-Up Confidential"	September 5, 1987
The Roseanne Barr Show	September 19, 1987
Spalding Gray: Terrors of Pleasure	November 28, 1987
Paul Reiser: "Out on a Whim"	December 5, 1987
Jackie Mason's The World According to Me!	February 6, 1988
Rodney Dangerfield: "Nothin’ Goes Right"	February 13, 1988
Mr. Miller Goes to Washington Starring Dennis Miller	February 27, 1988
Women of the Night II feat. Andrea Martin	May 21, 1988
Richard Lewis: I’m Exhausted	June 18, 1988
The Louie Anderson Show	September 10, 1988
The Twelfth Annual Young Comedians Show feat. Paul Rodriguez	September 17, 1988
The Kids in the Hall	October 16, 1988
Bobcat Goldthwait: Is He Like That All the Time?	November 26, 1988
Andrew Dice Clay: The Diceman Cometh	December 31, 1988
Rodney Dangerfield: Opening Night at Rodney's Place	May 6, 1989
Billy Crystal: Midnight Train to Moscow	October 21, 1989
