= George Carlin at USC =

- Written by: George Carlin
- Directed by: Marty Callner
- Starring: George Carlin
- Country of origin: United States

Production
- Running time: 85 minutes

Original release
- Network: HBO
- Release: April 11, 1977

On Location: George Carlin at USC (aka An Evening with George Carlin at USC) is American comedian George Carlin's first ever HBO special, recorded March 5, 1977, at the University of Southern California in Los Angeles. This unique taping lasted 85 minutes. He had also explained to the audience that before this special came about, he had never done a show for home consumption or reproduction.

In the process of planning this broadcast, the word spread quickly, and so much so that it resulted in a serious legal hearing at the Federal Communications Commission. Due to the controversy, Carlin sticks with more user-friendly material.

However, a federal court of appeals ruled in Carlin's favor and allowed him his right to free speech. This was mentioned during the opening of the program by Newsweek columnist Shana Alexander, which explained that it is the kind of entertainment that was rarely seen or heard on cable or network television at the time. Also, nearing the end of the taping, the video freezes and a message appears for the sense of responsibility. That message reads:

"THE FINAL SEGMENT OF MR. CARLIN'S PERFORMANCE CONTAINS ESPECIALLY CONTROVERSIAL LANGUAGE, PLEASE CONSIDER WHETHER YOU WISH TO CONTINUE VIEWING."

For that segment was wholly based on the "Seven Dirty Words". He also mentioned that the many ways of referring to these words outnumbered the actual few words that existed.

== Program ==
1. Intro & Warning (1:40)
2. Program Open (:36)
3. Personal Memories (2:22)
4. Taking The Stage (10:27)
5. Shopping (7:52)
6. Walking (3:59)
7. Dogs & Cats (9:27)
8. Old Folks & Kids (8:00)
9. Food (3:30)
10. The News (3:20)
11. Brand Names
12. Perversion of Language
13. Forbidden Words (23:24)
14. Closing Credits (1:47)

== See also ==
- Home Box Office
- On Location (TV series)
- Federal Communications Commission
- University of Southern California
- Seven dirty words
- Newsweek
- Shana Alexander (1925-2005)
