= George Carlin: Again! =

1978 American stand-up comedy TV special

- Written by: George Carlin
- Directed by: Marty Callner
- Starring: George Carlin
- Country of origin: United States
- Original language: English

Production
- Running time: 81 minutes

Original release
- Network: HBO
- Release: September 8, 1978

George Carlin: Again! (sometimes listed as On Location: George Carlin at Phoenix) is American comedian George Carlin's second HBO stand-up television special. It was filmed in the round at The Celebrity Theatre in Phoenix, Arizona on July 23, 1978.

== Synopsis ==
The opening segment of the show contains pictures from Carlin's childhood which he narrates over: "I thought we might take a look at some of the pictures from the days when my show business career was just starting". The narration segues into Carlin waiting backstage to go on. He begins his routine by acknowledging the audience before diving into his "Goofy Shit" list which includes some new routines: Sandman on a rainy night, large craft warnings, Marine land fish sticks, centipedes, waiters in waiting rooms, evening gowns at night clubs, fluorescent lights, Kleenex targets, the hats that are not there, frogs legs, emptying the wishing wells, dream credits, why there is no blue food (first performed at the very first episode of Saturday Night Live), skilled and unskilled workers, why we buy flowers, and cleaning the church.

Carlin then performs a new long routine about time, who has the time, and words we use to describe time ("Sooner than you think... sounds spooky doesn't it?")

He then sits down to perform an uproarious version of the "New News" routine combining new material with the material from An Evening With Wally Londo Featuring Bill Slaszo and On the Road. This routine is received very well by the audience, including when someone throws him a joint onto the stage. He then does his famous imitation of Al Sleet the "Hippie-Dippie Weather Man". ("Tonight's forecast... dark!")

Carlin performs a new version of "Death and Dying" than the one from On the Road and the final part of the routine is a rendition of the "Seven Words You Can Never Say on Television" sketch (first performed on Class Clown). The routine is expanded from the Occupation: Foole performance. He adds a physical comedy portion in the beginning with "Trial and Error", and presents the idea that "we have more ways to describe the dirty words that we have actual dirty words":

"Someone was quite interested in these words. They kept referring to them: they called them bad, dirty, filthy, foul, vile, vulgar, coarse, in poor taste, unseemly, street talk, gutter talk, locker room language, barracks talk, bawdy, naughty, saucy, raunchy, rude, crude, lewd, lascivious, indecent, profane, obscene, blue, off-color, risqué, suggestive, cursing, cussing, swearing... and all I could think of was: shit, piss, fuck, cunt, cocksucker, motherfucker, and tits!"

Carlin admits that the original list was not complete, even by adding fart, turd and twat. He assures the audience that "some of [their] favorites might make the list this year". Adding more words to the list: asshole, ballbag, hardon, pisshard, blueballs, taint, nooky, snatch, box, pussy, pecker, peckerhead, peckertracks, jism, joint, donniker, dork, poontang, cornhole, and dingleberry.

Another new section is added to the routine referring to the word "motherfucker" coming off the list due to a phone argument with an English purist calling "motherfucker" a duplication of the root word "fuck". Carlin's reaction to the purist is "Hey motherfucker, how did you get my phone number anyway?" The purist convinces him to drop it, but Carlin is now unhappy with the current rhythm of the list (now with cocksucker standing alone as the only multi-syllabic word on the list) happily repeating the old list in a lyrical manner.

Carlin continues with an extended version of the familiar "tits" portion of the routine and incorporating the "Cute Little Farts" routine into the mix. After briefly going through familiar jokes referring to turd, twat ("Twat's twat and that's that"), prick, and ball. The famous section about the word "fuck" is longwinded as Carlin reminds people what happened to the word, "We fucked it up". The routine incorporates more physical comedy. He refers to the famous phrase "Make love not war" wishing he had thought of that so he could retire and go to the beach. Coming up with his own phrase "Make fuck, not kill", Carlin explains "I'm not looking to retire anytime soon" which is followed by thunderous applause. Replacing "kill" for "fuck", Carlin incorporates new references including "Shamu the fucker whale" with Carlin swimming away in a panicking manner. His final message is one of love before he introduces his wife, Brenda, onstage. Carlin says goodbye to the audience or "Fuck You!" before he dances a Sicilian tarantella over the rolling credits.

== Track listing ==
1. Open (0:35)
2. Beginnings (2:45)
3. Live In Phoenix (2:17)
4. I Wonder (8:48)
5. What Time Is It? (11:28)
6. The Long Newscast (11:05)
7. Al Sleet (2:40)
8. Death Is Imminent (13:36)
9. Filthy Words (25:41)
10. Mrs. Carlin (0:43)
11. Program Credits (1:41)
