= Burns and Carlin at the Playboy Club Tonight =

Live album by Burns and Carlin
- Released: 1963
- Recorded: May 1960
- Genre: Comedy
- Label: ERA Records (Burns and Carlin); Laff Records (Killer Carlin)

Burns and Carlin chronology
Burns and Carlin at the Playboy Club Tonight (1963)	Take-Offs and Put-Ons (1967)

George Carlin chronology
Indecent Exposure (1978)	Killer Carlin (1981)	A Place for My Stuff (1981)

Professional ratings
Review scores
Source	Rating
Allmusic	3/5 stars

Burns and Carlin at the Playboy Club Tonight is the 1963 first and only album by the short-lived comedy duo of Jack Burns and George Carlin. The album's title is technically a slight exaggeration, because the album was actually recorded at a club named Cosmo Alley in Hollywood, California; not at the Playboy Club. It was recorded in May 1960 but was not released until 1963.

By the time of the album's release, Burns and Carlin had already split up amicably in 1962 to pursue separate endeavors, and the rights of the album were given to Carlin as his first album. Burns teamed with Avery Schreiber and the duo were a successful comedy act until their breakup in 1974. Carlin continued to perform stand-up and record comedy albums until his death in 2008.

The album has been re-issued twice, both with alternate track listings: in 1972 as The Original George Carlin and again in 1981 as Killer Carlin (which itself was re-issued on CD in 1995).

== Track listings ==
=== 1963: Burns and Carlin at the Playboy Club Tonight ===
Side A
No.	Title	Length
1.	"Mothers Club"	6:07
2.	"Killer Carlin"	3:00
3.	"Captain Jack & Jolly George"	4:14
4.	"War Pictures"	4:29

Side B
No.	Title	Length
5.	"Herb Coolhouse"	5:49
6.	"Edward R. Murrow"	4:01
7.	"Lenny Bruce-Mort Sahl"	5:43
Total length:		33:26

=== 1972: The Original George Carlin ===
Side A
No.	Title	Length
1.	"Mother's Club"	----
2.	"Herb Coolhouse"	4:33
3.	"The Original 'Person to Person'"	3:57
4.	"Captain Jack and Jolly George"	----

Side B
No.	Title	Length
5.	"Lenny Bruce"	2:15
6.	"Mort Sahl"	3:32
7.	"Killer Carlin"	----
8.	"War Pictures"	----
Total length:		----

=== 1981: Killer Carlin ===
Track list is the same for the CD re-release of Killer Carlin in 1995.

Side A
No.	Title	Length
1.	"Mothers Club"	4:41
2.	"Killer Carlin"	2:49
3.	"Capt. Jack and Jolly George"	4:03
4.	"War Pictures"	3:43

Side B
No.	Title	Length
5.	"The Cool World"	5:17
6.	"Person to Person"	3:36
7.	"The Sickest"	1:54
Total length:		26:05
