= George Carlin: 40 Years of Comedy =

George Carlin: 40 Years of Comedy (1997) is comedian George Carlin's tenth HBO special. It was broadcast live from the Wheeler Opera House in Aspen, Colorado, as part of the US Comedy Arts Festival. Unlike Carlin's other stand-up specials, this contains only 27 minutes of stand-up performance. The rest is a retrospective celebrating Carlin's 40th anniversary in entertainment, with clips of his television appearances and an interview with the host Jon Stewart. Some of Carlin's material was repeated in his next special, You Are All Diseased.
