= Jack Burns =

American actor, writer, and producer (1933–2020)

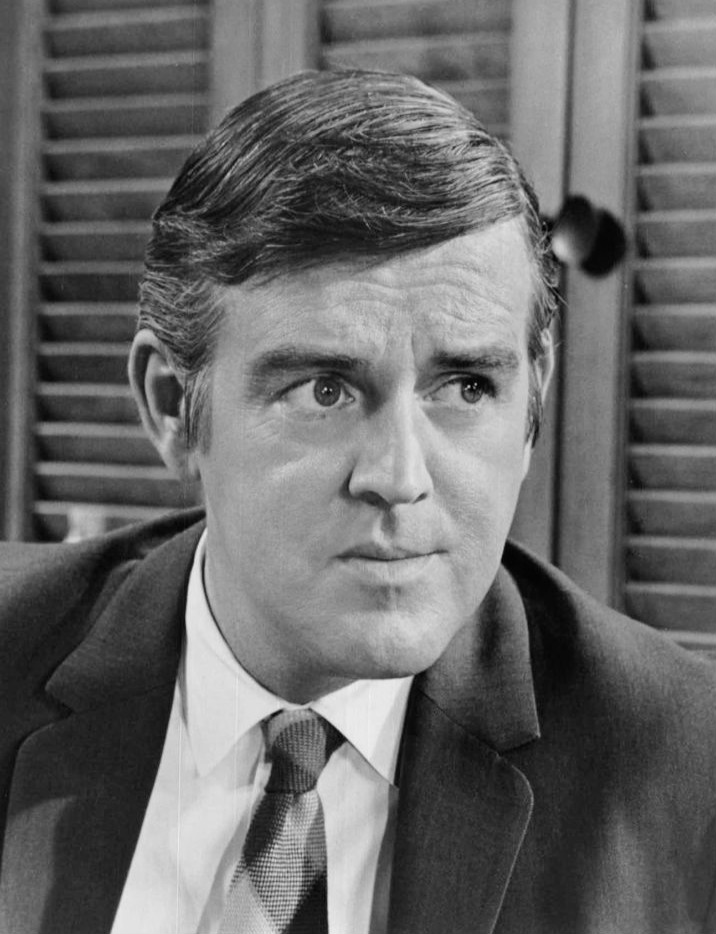
- Jack Burns in 1971
- Born: John Francis Burns; November 15, 1933; Boston, Massachusetts, U.S.
- Died: January 27, 2020 (aged 86); Los Angeles, California
- Occupations: Comedian; actor; writer; producer

Comedy career
- Years active: 1959–2006
- Medium: Stand-up, radio, television, film, theatre

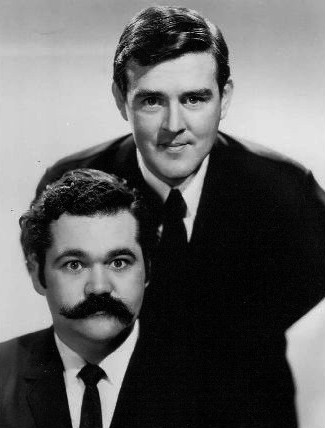
Avery Schreiber and Jack Burns (1966)

John Francis Burns (November 15, 1933 – January 27, 2020) was an American comedian, actor, writer and producer. During the 1960s, he was part of two comedy partnerships, first with George Carlin and later with Avery Schreiber. He is also known for his short stint as Warren Ferguson, Barney Fife's replacement on The Andy Griffith Show in 1965. By the 1970s, he had transitioned to working behind the camera as a writer and producer on such comedy series as The Muppet Show and Hee Haw.

== Biography ==
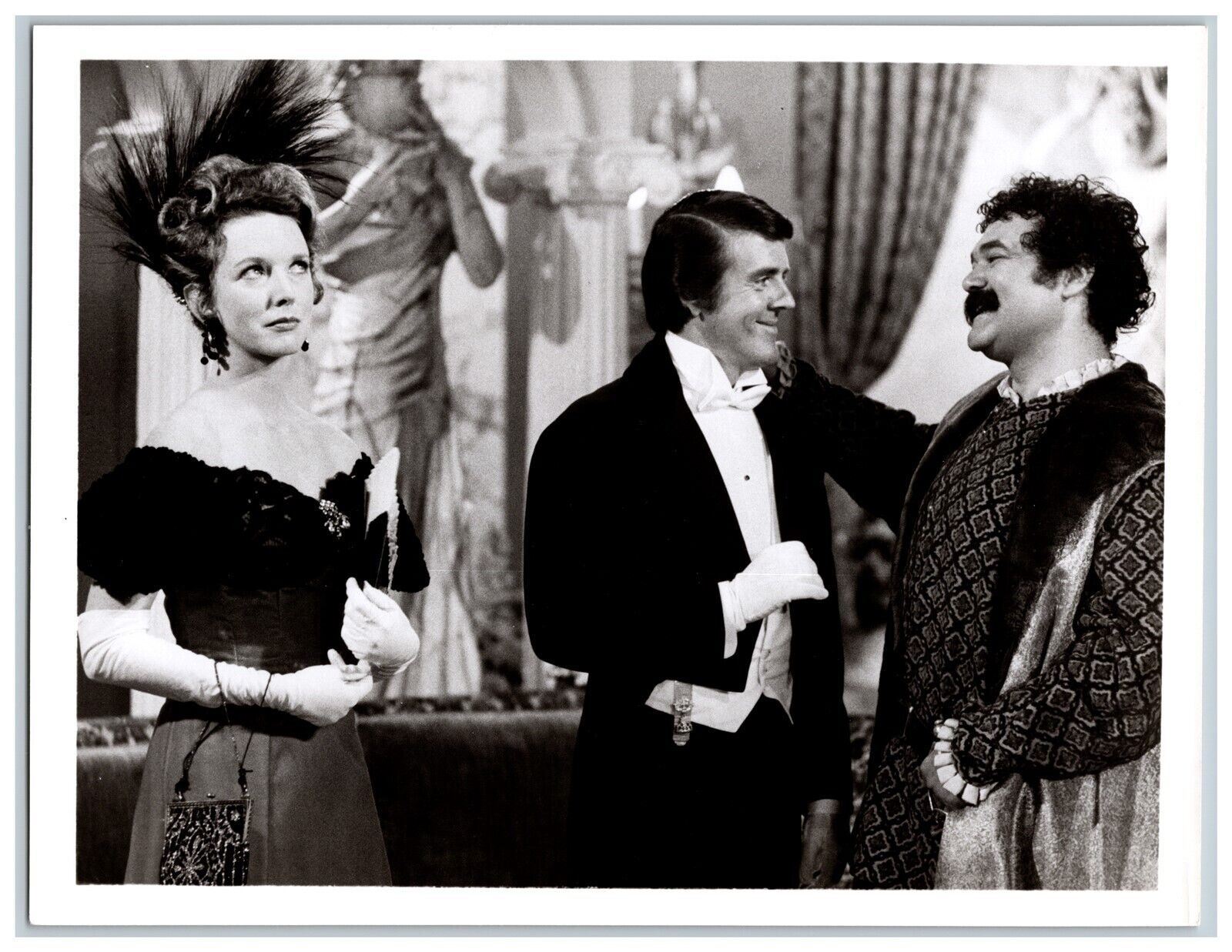
Barbara Babcock (left) with Avery Schreiber (right) and Burns in Love, American Style (1973)

Burns enlisted in the United States Marine Corps in 1952 but soon realized that he did not want to be in the military: "the first week of boot camp changed my mind." He served in Korea, rose to the rank of sergeant and was discharged around 1954.

Burns began his comedy career in 1959 when he partnered with George Carlin; both were working for radio station KXOL in Fort Worth, Texas. After successful performances at a Fort Worth beat coffeehouse, The Cellar, Burns and Carlin headed for California in February 1960 and continued to work together for two more years. An album containing some of their material was released in 1963 titled Burns and Carlin at the Playboy Club Tonight.

Burns teamed with Avery Schreiber, whom he met when they were both members of The Second City, to form a comedy and improv troupe based in Chicago. Burns and Schreiber were best known for a series of routines in which Burns played a talkative taxicab passenger, with Schreiber as the driver. During the summer of 1973, they appeared on the ABC variety series The Burns and Schreiber Comedy Hour.

During the first half of the 1965–1966 season of The Andy Griffith Show, in an attempt to replace the Barney Fife character after Don Knotts left the show, Burns was cast as Warren Ferguson, a dedicated but inept deputy sheriff. Warren possessed some of the same qualities as Barney which irritated Andy but without the chemistry. His character was not popular and was dropped after 11 appearances.

In 1967, he was cast as Candy Butcher in The Night They Raided Minsky's. In 1971, he was cast as Mr. Kelly in The Partridge Family episode "Dora, Dora, Dora”. He voiced the character of Ralph Kane in the short-lived syndicated primetime cartoon Wait Till Your Father Gets Home. He became the head writer for the first season of Hee Haw and The Muppet Show. Schreiber appeared on an episode with The Muppet Show during the first season. Burns also cowrote The Muppet Movie (with Jerry Juhl, his successor as head writer of The Muppet Show). He hosted a 1977 episode of NBC's Saturday Night Live.

In the early 1980s, Burns became a writer, announcer and occasional performer on the ABC sketch comedy series Fridays. He and comedian Michael Richards were involved in a staged on-air fight with Andy Kaufman, later recreated in the Kaufman biopic Man on the Moon (with Kaufman's longtime friend Bob Zmuda portraying Burns).

Burns teamed with Lorenzo Music to provide the voices for a pair of crash-test dummies named Vince and Larry, in a series of Department of Transportation public-service announcements that promoted the use of seat belts. Distributed by the Ad Council, the advertising campaign ran from 1985 to 1998. In 1993, he starred in the animated series Animaniacs as the voice of Sid the Squid. Schreiber also appeared on the show as the voice of Beanie the Brain-Dead Bison. Burns was a guest voice in a 1999 episode of The Simpsons titled "Beyond Blunderdome”.

Burns learned he had pancreatic cancer in 2017. He died from respiratory failure on January 27, 2020, at age 86 at his home in Toluca Lake, California.
