= On Location Vacations =

American media company

- Company type: Media company and blog
- Industry: Film industry
- Founded: 2006
- Founder: Christine Bord
- Headquarters: United States, New York

On Location Vacations (OLV) is an American media company and blog that covers TV and movie filming locations and filming news. Based in New York, OLV is notable as one of the largest film location websites in the United States, providing travel information based on where major American television shows and films are currently being produced. On Location Vacations has been also featured in major national media outlets such as Newsweek, Business Week, Entertainment Weekly, The Wall Street Journal, and The Today Show. In 2021, contributors moved to Twitter and other social media to post content, and closed down the website.

== Background ==
On Location Vacations (OLV) was founded by Christine Bord in 2006 while she was a graduate student studying design. Bord founded OLV as a blog that covers TV and movie filming locations, filming news, and behind-the-scene tours.

On Location Vacations focuses on notable historic movie sets located in Los Angeles, New York City, and other regions, as well as the best locations for celebrity sightings.

== Selected publications ==
- Bord, Christine (2012). OLV's Field Guide to Celebrity Sighting: New York City. On Location Vacations.

== Selected awards ==
- 2015 - 7th Shorty Awards: Finalist in Blogger

== See also ==
- Location shooting
- Filming location
