= Back in Town (George Carlin album) =

Live album by George Carlin
- Released: September 17, 1996
- Recorded: March 29–30, 1996
- Venue: Beacon Theater, New York City
- Genre: Comedy
- Length: 61:07
- Label: Atlantic/WEA
- Producer: George Carlin

George Carlin chronology
Jammin' in New York (1992)	Back in Town (1996)	You Are All Diseased (1999)

Professional ratings
Review scores
Source	Rating
Allmusic	3/5 stars

Back in Town is George Carlin's 15th album and ninth HBO special. It was also released on CD on September 17, 1996. This was also his first of many performances at the Beacon Theatre in New York City.

== Track listing ==
1. "Abortion" - 8:41
2. "Sanctity of Life" - 3:50
3. "Capital Punishment" - 8:40
4. "State Prison Farms" - 8:13
5. "Farting in Public" - 3:00
6. "Familiar Expressions" - 9:14
7. "Free-Floating Hostility" - 19:30

a) Quote Marks in the Air
b) Badda-Boom, Badda-Bing
c) Bad Hair Day
d) I Heard That
e) My Needs Aren't Being Met
f) Mickey Mouse's Birthday
g) The Two Pandas in the Zoo
h) Sperm/Egg-Donors, etc.
i) Innocent Victims
j) Personal Bottles of Water
k) Women with Hyphenated Names
l) Telephone Calling Plans
m) Motivation Tapes/Books
n) One-Hour Photo Finishing
o) Too Many Vehicles
p) Backwards Baseball Hats
q) Earrings on Men
r) Colored Ribbons
s) Christian Athletes and Voices in One's Head
t) Aftershave and Cologne
u) Cowboy Hats and Cowboy Boots
v) Assholes with Camcorders
w) Whining Baby Boomers
x) In Defense of Politicians
y) Why I Don't Vote
z) Credits

== In popular culture ==
During the ruling of Dobbs v. Jackson Women's Health Organization, a clip of Carlin's bit about abortion went viral on many platforms.
