= A Place for My Stuff =

Studio album by George Carlin
- Released: November 1981
- Recorded: August 1981
- Genre: Comedy
- Length: 50:57
- Label: Atlantic

George Carlin chronology
Killer Carlin (1981)	A Place for My Stuff (1981)	Carlin on Campus (1984)

A Place for My Stuff is American comedian George Carlin's ninth album. Unlike his previous albums, which consisted entirely of stand-up performance, A Place for My Stuff contains a number of studio-recorded tracks, typically poking fun at the format and candor of community radio, commercials and television.

In his autobiography "Last Words", Carlin was dismissive of the album, commenting that while he thought the stand-up material was acceptable, the studio material "really stunk".

Professional ratings
Review scores
Source	Rating
AllMusic	4/5 stars

== Track listing ==
No.	Title	Length
1.	"Acknowledgements"	0:26
2.	"Opening"	1:13
3.	"A Place for My Stuff"	4:35
4.	"First Announcements"	1:34
5.	"Have a Nice Day"	3:14
6.	"Rice Krispies"	2:35
7.	"Second Announcements"	1:09
8.	"Interview with Jesus"	8:06
9.	"Join the Book Club"	2:37
10.	"Abortion"	0:28
11.	"Third Announcements"	1:26
12.	"Ice Box Man"	6:16
13.	"Fourth Announcements"	0:53
14.	"Asshole, Jackoff, Scumbag"	6:29
15.	"Fifth Announcements"	0:25
16.	"Fussy Eater (Part 1)"	3:38
17.	"Sixth Announcements"	1:05
18.	"Fussy Eater (Part 2)"	4:32
19.	"Seventh Announcements"	0:16
