= Classic Gold (album) =

Compilation album by George Carlin
- Released: October 27, 1992
- Recorded: 1971–73
- Genre: Comedy
- Label: Atlantic Records

George Carlin chronology
Parental Advisory: Explicit Lyrics (1990)	Classic Gold (1992)	Jammin' in New York (1992)

Professional ratings
Review scores
Source	Rating
AllMusic	4.5/5 stars

Classic Gold is an album by American comedian George Carlin, released on October 27, 1992, on Atlantic Records. It contains the comedian's first three gold albums in their entirety: FM & AM (disc 1, tracks 1–10), Class Clown (disc 1, 11–13 and disc 2, tracks 1–6) and Occupation: Foole (disc 2, tracks 7–17).

== Track listing ==
=== Disc 1 ===
1. "Shoot"
2. "The Hair Piece"
3. "Sex in Commercials"
4. "Drugs"
5. "Birth Control"
6. "Son of Wino"
7. "Divorce Game"
8. "Ed Sullivan Self Taught"
9. "Let's Make a Deal"
10. "The 11 O'Clock News"
11. "Class Clown"
12. "Wasted Time—Sharing a Swallow"
13. "Values (How Much Is That Dog Crap in the Window?)"

=== Disc 2 ===
1. "I Used to Be Irish Catholic"
2. "The Confessional"
3. "Special Dispensation: Heaven, Hell, Purgatory and Limbo"
4. "Heavy Mysteries"
5. "Muhammad Ali-America the Beautiful"
6. "Seven Words You Can Never Say on Television"
7. "Welcome to My Job"
8. "Occupation: Foole"
9. "White Harlem"
10. "The Hallway Groups"
11. "Black Consciousness"
12. "New York Voices"
13. "Grass Swept the Neighborhood"
14. "Childhood Clichés"
15. "Cute Little Farts"
16. "Raisin Rhetoric"
17. "Filthy Words"
