= Carlin on Campus =

Live album by George Carlin
- Released: 1984
- Recorded: April 18–19, 1984, UCLA, Los Angeles, California
- Genre: Comedy
- Length: 47:40
- Label: Eardrum

George Carlin chronology
A Place for My Stuff (1981)	Carlin on Campus (1984)	Playin' with Your Head (1986)

Professional ratings
Review scores
Source	Rating
AllMusic	2.5/5 stars

Carlin on Campus is the 10th album and fourth HBO special by American comedian George Carlin, recorded April 18–19, 1984. The show features mostly new material. The opening features Carlin in Catholic school with a short version of "Class Clown" and animation shorts. The ending features Carlin playing piano to an original song called "Armadillo Blues".

George Carlin's twelfth comedy album was also called Carlin on Campus. It includes new material, non sequiturs and extended sequences of two of his most famous routines, Baseball and Football, and An Incomplete List of Impolite Words. The content of this album is almost 50% different from the similarly titled HBO special.

== Track listing: HBO special ==
1. "Opening"
2. "Prayer"
3. "A Place for My Stuff"
4. "Cartoon: It's No Bullshit"
5. "Little Dogs"
6. "Flamethrowers"
7. "Stuff on Driving"
8. "Cartoon: New News"
9. "Whistling"
10. "Assholes"
11. "Stomach Sounds"
12. "Getting Sick"
13. "Baseball and Football"
14. "Cartoon: Universe of Sports"
15. "Sports Cheer"
16. "Armadillo Blues"
17. "Cartoon: Silent Film Star Death"

== Track listing: album ==
All tracks by George Carlin.

No.	Title	Length
1.	"Opening Sequence"	1:50
2.	"The Prayer"	1:17
3.	"First Leftfielders"	4:56
4.	"A Moment of Silence"	0:49
5.	"Second Leftfielders"	5:40
6.	"Breakfast Wine and Who's Boss"	1:47
7.	"Third Leftfielders"	3:09
8.	"Baseball and Football"	2:53
9.	"Fourth Leftfielders"	1:45
10.	"Cars and Driving"	18:10
11.	"An Incomplete List of Impolite Words"	5:27

=== Personnel ===
- Toni Biggs – Production Coordination
- Matt Brady – Assistant Engineer
- George Carlin – Producer
- David Daoud Coleman – Cover Design
- Bob Merritt – Engineer, Editing
- Jim Rasfeld – Design
- Don Worsham – Engineer

== See also ==
- On Location (TV series)
