= Jammin' in New York =

Live album by George Carlin
- Released: November 10, 1992
- Recorded: April 24–25, 1992
- Venues: Paramount Theater, Madison Square Garden, New York City
- Genre: Comedy
- Length: 56:56
- Label: Eardrum/Atlantic Records
- Producers: Jerry Hamza, Brenda Carlin

George Carlin chronology
Classic Gold (1992)	Jammin' in New York (1992)	Back in Town (1996)

Jammin' in New York is George Carlin's 14th album and eighth HBO special, recorded on April 24 and 25, 1992, at the Paramount Theater, on the grounds of Madison Square Garden in New York City. Topics include the war in the Persian Gulf, similarities and differences among average Americans and language used at airports.

On-air HBO promos for the live broadcast on April 25, 1992, referred to the program as George Carlin: Live at the Paramount. Before the opening credits, the words "This show is for SAM" appear, a reference to comedian Sam Kinison, who had died in a car crash two weeks before the recording.

The album won the 1993 Grammy Award for Best Spoken Comedy Album. Carlin considered Jammin' in New York his favorite and best HBO special.

The VHS tape features the first of the two performances George gave for this special. The DVD and subsequent digital versions use the second performance, which some consider inferior.

Professional ratings
Review scores
Source	Rating
Allmusic	link
Amazon.com	5/5 stars

== Track listing ==
1. "Rockets and Penises in the Persian Gulf" – 7:35
2. "Little Things We Share" – 7:47
3. "Airline Announcements" – 16:44
4. "Golf Courses for the Homeless" – 11:13
5. "The Planet Is Fine" – 13:37
