= Take-Offs and Put-Ons =

Live album by George Carlin
- Released: 1967
- Recorded: November 25–27, 1966
- Genre: Comedy
- Length: 36:15
- Label: RCA Victor
- Producer: Tom Berman

George Carlin chronology
Burns and Carlin at the Playboy Club Tonight (1963)	Take-Offs and Put-Ons (1967)	FM & AM (1972)

Professional ratings
Review scores
Source	Rating
Allmusic	4.5/5 stars

Take-Offs and Put-Ons is the second album and first solo album by American comedian George Carlin. Recorded in Detroit, Michigan at the Roostertail on November 25, 26 and 27, 1966, the album was first released in 1967 as RCA Victor LSP-3772 and was nominated for a Grammy Award later that year. Many of the routines and characters were already familiar to audiences due to the comedian's performances on television programs such as The Mike Douglas Show and The Merv Griffin Show. In 1972, the album was reissued on the RCA Camden budget label (CAS-2566) with new cover artwork; The album was reissued again in 1975 in the mid-priced RCA 'Pure Gold' series (ANL1-1086). The album was reissued on compact disc in 1997, on the One Way Records label. An edit of "Wonderful WINO" was released as a single (with "Al Sleet, Your Hippy Dippy Weatherman" on the b-side, edited from "The Newscast").

== Track listing ==
=== Side one ===
1. Wonderful WINO (Top-40 Disc Jockey) – 5:43
2. Commercials – 8:22
3. Daytime Television – 9:34

=== Side two ===
1. The Newscast – 7:29
2. The Indian Sergeant – 5:08
