= Parental Advisory: Explicit Lyrics (album) =

Live album by George Carlin
- Released: November 20, 1990
- Recorded: January 12–13, 1990; State Theatre; New Brunswick, New Jersey
- Genre: Comedy
- Length: 53:09
- Label: Atlantic/Laugh

George Carlin chronology
What Am I Doing in New Jersey? (1988)	Parental Advisory: Explicit Lyrics (1990)	Classic Gold (1992)

Parental Advisory: Explicit Lyrics is the 13th album by American comedian George Carlin. The album consists of content from his seventh HBO comedy special Doin' It Again, with some segments omitted and others rearranged. The opening to the HBO special features flashbacks to all of Carlin's previous HBO specials while Carlin talks about the specials to an unseen narrator, in the style of a patient speaking to a psychologist.

== Album information ==
The title passes as a parental advisory label due to the fact that there is profanity and adult content. A warning in the liner notes to the album reads, "This recording contains no backmasking or subliminal suggestions. All messages from the Devil are recorded clearly and audibly in straightforward Standard American English." Another warning states, "Please! Try not to commit suicide after listening to this album." Two epigrams are also given: "America is like a melting pot. The people at the bottom get burned, and the scum floats to the top" (Charlie King) and "Never let them make you crawl" (John Dillinger).

On his appearance during The Arsenio Hall Show on November 30, 1989, Carlin announced the working title for the special as You're All Mentally Ill, which 10 years later would be reworked into the title of his 1999 special You Are All Diseased.

Professional ratings
Review scores
Source	Rating
Allmusic	3/5 stars

== Track listing ==
The order of the album is different from the HBO special.

No.	Title	Length
1.	"Offensive Language"	4:48
2.	"I Ain't Afraid of Cancer"	1:59
3.	"Some People Are Stupid"	2:28
4.	"Rape Can Be Funny"	3:52
5.	"Feminist Blowjob"	7:28
6.	"Good Ideas"	2:29
7.	"Things You Never See"	1:02
8.	"Things You Never Hear"	0:58
9.	"Things You Don't Wanna Hear"	2:16
10.	"Life's Little Moments"	3:59
11.	"I Love My Dog"	7:03
12.	"Organ Donor Programs"	1:19
13.	"Don't Pull the Plug on Me"	1:31
14.	"They're Only Words"	2:49
15.	"Euphemisms"	9:48
