= Tonberry =

Fictional species

- Final Fantasy race
- Tonberry in Final Fantasy XV
- First appearance: Final Fantasy V
- Created by: Tetsuya Nomura
- Genre: Role-playing video game

The Tonberry (トンベリ, Tonberi) is a fictional species from the Final Fantasy series and one of its recurring elements. It made its first appearance in Final Fantasy V, and has appeared in multiple subsequent Final Fantasy games. It is a salamander-like creature wearing a robe and carrying a knife and a lantern, who approaches slowly in order to do extreme, often fatal damage. While normally short in stature and "cute" in appearance, there have been multiple variants in the series, including the Tonberry King and a more realistic incarnation in Final Fantasy XVI. It was created by Tetsuya Nomura, who aspired to create a monster that would popularize Final Fantasy monsters like Dragon Quest monsters did.

The Tonberry has received generally positive reception, considered among the best and most iconic Final Fantasy characters. While Tonberries throughout the series have largely been thought of as endearing, the anthropomorphic Final Fantasy XVI Tonberry went viral on social media due to its unusually "shapely" buttocks. Writer Drew Mackie analyzed the possible origins of the Tonberry, speculating it may be inspired by the sea monk.

== Appearances ==
The Tonberry originally appeared as an enemy in the video game Final Fantasy V. It is an enemy that, when encountered, slowly approaches the player's characters and having a high amount of hit points. Upon getting close enough, it attacks one or more of the characters, often killing them in a single hit. They reappear in Final Fantasy VI, including multiple new incarnations, including an encounter with a trio of Tonberries and a boss Tonberry called Master Tonberry. In this game, it gains the ability to counterattack. Final Fantasy VII features them as an opponent in the Gold Saucer Battle Square, and the Master Tonberry is found later in the game. In Final Fantasy VIII, a boss called Tonberry King can be fought; if defeated, the player is allowed to summon a Tonberry to fight alongside them in combat. It also allows the player to access shops to purchase things anywhere in the game. In Final Fantasy XII: Revenant Wings, the player can both ally with and fight against Tonberries.

In Final Fantasy XIII, the player is made to fight it instead of a different powerful enemy called Cie'eth, which it had just killed. In Final Fantasy XIV, Tonberries are the citizens of the Nymian civilization, turned into these creatures by a disease. The ostracizing they faced caused them to become bitter and rage-filled, made hostile due to their king; once he is defeated, the Tonberries become friendly. Enemies called Tonberry Stalkers, larger versions of Tonberries, can also be fought, and the player can have a wind-up toy version of a Tonberry follow them. The game also features a costume for the player's character to wear designed after the Tonberry. The downloadable content The Rising Tide for Final Fantasy XVI adds Tonberries to the game, including versions that are taller. In the video game Final Fantasy Type-0, a Tonberry accompanies the character Kurasame. The Tonberry makes a cameo in the video game Life is Strange: Double Exposure, featured on an in-game turtleneck.

Tonberry has received multiple pieces of merchandise, including a statue made for Final Fantasy V, a food item at the Final Fantasy cafe based on it, and a card in a Final Fantasy-themed Magic: The Gathering set.

== Concept and creation ==
The Tonberry was created by Tetsuya Nomura, who made monsters like it in order to popularize Final Fantasy monsters in the same way that Dragon Quest monsters were. It is a green salamander-like creature that wears a robe and carries a knife and a lantern. It approaches slowly, and once close enough, will do extreme damage to a character, often killing them. They have other variables involved in their attack, including an attack that damages more depending on the number of monsters the character killed or the number of steps taken. According to its Final Fantasy VII concept art, Tonberry do not appear in battle with other monster types. It was initially intended to have multiple variants in Final Fantasy VII, such as different colors, though most were cut by the time of the game's release. A variant exists in Final Fantasy XII: Revenant Wings that has a fish tail. Takeo Kujiraoka, director of Final Fantasy XVI's downloadable content, stated that the content would feature a redesign of Tonberry that was a "little creepier than previous iterations".He also stated that they would be designed to match the game's faster-paced real-time gameplay. One of these versions is taller and more "serious" according to Automaton Media writer Amber V. It has been given multiple different names in English releases, including Pug and Dingleberry, before they used Tonberry from Final Fantasy VII on.

== Reception and analysis ==
IGN writer Dave Smith considered the Tonberry among the best Final Fantasy characters, stating that among Final Fantasy creatures, it was the "weirdest" and "most endearing." He stated that it was such a cute character that it made him forget dangerous, and that many series fans have learned to fear it. Futaman writer Amami remarked how they believed that every Final Fantasy player first encountering Tonberry in Final Fantasy V likely underestimated it, only for their characters to be killed. They felt that this moment helped condition players to fear the Tonberry in future games. Following the appearance of the Tonberry in Final Fantasy XVI, their butt and thighs got a lot of attention on social media. Eurogamer writer Ed Nightingale stated that the Tonberry being a particularly frightening foe was something any Final Fantasy fan knows, believing that the Final Fantasy XVI incarnation was a particularly frightening version, particularly the Tonberry King, citing how much more realistic they are. Kotaku writer Heather Alexander considered it one of the most iconic enemies in the Final Fantasy series as well as "the funniest fucking thing on the planet." She felt that the combination of the threat they pose as well as the "Goomba-esque design" was what made it so funny.

Writer Drew Mackie analyzed the origins of the Tonberry, both its design and name origin, presenting multiple examples of possible origins. One of these theories was that the name may have come from Glastonbury, noting that the modern-day Japanese name for it was グラストンベリ and adding that the last four characters are identical to Tonberry's Japanese name. He supported this possible connection by stating that Tonberry's robes resembled monk robes, potentially connecting it to Glastonbury Abbey, and that the Japanese Wikipedia article for Glastonbury has a strong focus on the legendary aspects of the town. He also stated that the Tonberry incarnation from Final Fantasy XII; Revenant Wings could have been a reference to the sea monk due to its fish tail, Another explanation he cited was that its name comes from Dom Pérignon, the name of a monk and of a champagne, the latter which is often shortened to donperi (ドンペリ), arguing that this is similar to Tonberry's Japanese name. He believed this was extra plausible due to the presence of a character in the video game Trials of Mana called Donperi, also made by Square Enix. Despite finding credence in these theories, he did not identify either as definitive.
