= What Am I Doing in New Jersey? =

Live album by George Carlin
- Released: August 15, 1988
- Recorded: March 25–26, 1988, Park Performing Arts Center, Union City, New Jersey
- Genre: Comedy
- Length: 47:45
- Label: Atlantic/Eardrum
- Producer: George Carlin

George Carlin chronology
Playin' with Your Head (1986)	What Am I Doing in New Jersey? (1988)	Parental Advisory: Explicit Lyrics (1990)

Professional ratings
Review scores
Source	Rating
Allmusic	3/5 stars

What Am I Doing in New Jersey? is the 12th album and sixth HBO special by American comedian George Carlin. It was recorded at the Park Performing Arts Center in Union City, New Jersey for an HBO special, and the album was released on August 15, 1988.

During Late Night with David Letterman on November 17, 1988, Carlin revealed that the working title of the special was What in God's Name Am I Doing in New Jersey?

The opening intro skit, in which George takes a cab to Union City, has Lloyd Lindsay Young of WWOR make an appearance.

== Track listing ==
No.	Title	Length
1.	"Reagan's Gang, Church People and American Values"	11:10
2.	"Keeping People Alert"	11:11
3.	"People I Can Do Without"	3:47
4.	"More Stuff on Cars and Driving"	21:37
