= Playin' with Your Head =

Live album by George Carlin
- Released: July 30, 1986
- Recorded: May 2–3, 1986, Beverly Theater, Los Angeles, California
- Genre: Comedy
- Length: 47:55
- Label: Eardrum/Atlantic Records

George Carlin chronology
Carlin on Campus (1984)	Playin' with Your Head (1986)	What Am I Doing in New Jersey? (1988)

Professional ratings
Review scores
Source	Rating
Allmusic	4/5 stars

Playin' with Your Head is the 11th album and fifth HBO special by American comedian George Carlin.

== Background ==
The album was recorded May 2–3, 1986, at the Beverly Theater in Los Angeles, and was released on July 30, 1986, on the Eardrum/Atlantic label. It was Carlin's fifth HBO stand-up concert special. In the HBO airing there is a short skit before and after the show in which he flees from three men seeking an envelope in his possession before going on stage. The identities of his pursuers are unknown—the credits before the skit merely dubs them "The Bad Guys"—but are played by Vic Tayback (of Alice fame), Rick Ducommun, and Anthony James. Carlin tears the envelope up after the performance, never revealing its contents or why his pursuers wanted it. At the end of the closing credits, the envelope is seen back on the table.

== Track listing ==
No.	Title	Length
1.	"Hello-Goodbye"	4:13
2.	"Love and Regards"	5:36
3.	"Groups and Charities"	3:55
4.	"Sports"	9:40
5.	"Five Twos"	2:01
6.	"Losing Things"	7:59
7.	"You're Lost"	1:40
8.	"Missing"	1:04
9.	"Earrings"	5:28
10.	"Battered Plants"	3:44
11.	"Things to Watch Out For"	2:35
