= Last Words (book) =

2009 autobiography by George Carlin

- First edition
- Author: George Carlin with Tony Hendra
- Language: English
- Subject: Autobiography
- Genre: Non-fiction
- Published: November 10, 2009 Free Press
- Publication place: United States
- Media type: Print (Hardcover)
- Pages: 320
- ISBN: 1-4391-7295-1
- Preceded by: Three Times Carlin: An Orgy of George

Last Words is the fifth and final book written by American stand-up comedian George Carlin. Serving as his autobiography, It was published on November 10, 2009. Last Words tells the story of his life from his conception, literally, to his final years; he died on June 22, 2008, at the age of 71. The book contains photos taken throughout Carlin's life.

In 1993, George Carlin asked his friend and bestselling author Tony Hendra to help him write his autobiography, although Carlin preferred to call it a "sortabiography". The two of them had scores of conversations, many of which were recorded, for almost fifteen years. During the conversations, they discussed Carlin's life, times, and evolution as a major comedian artist. After Carlin died, Hendra set out to assemble the book just as Carlin would have wanted.

This book was also released twice in audiobook format. The first recording at unabridged length narrated by Johnny Heller and the second with George's brother Patrick reading an abridgment.
