= You Are All Diseased =

Live album by George Carlin
- Released: May 14, 1999
- Recorded: February 6, 1999
- Venue: Beacon Theater (New York City)
- Genre: Comedy
- Length: 62:13
- Label: Eardrum
- Producer: George Carlin

George Carlin chronology
Back in Town (1996)	You Are All Diseased (1999)	The Little David Years (1971–1977) (1999)

You Are All Diseased is the 11th HBO stand up special and 16th album performed by George Carlin. This live broadcast artwork is a satirical stand-up piece on counterculture in the United States of America. It was recorded on February 6, 1999. It focuses on highly sensitive areas and hot button issues of American culture. According to the NY Times, the comedy comes from a more objective point of view, abstaining from a traditional left or right leaning style of comedy; and encourages critical thinking and the challenging of social norms. The TV special was nominated for two 1999 Emmy Awards, Outstanding Variety, Music or Comedy Special and Outstanding Performance In A Variety Or Music Program.

Professional ratings
Review scores
Source	Rating
Allmusic	3/5 stars

== Material/Topics ==
- Airport Security [8:02]
- Fear of Germs [5:58]
- Man Stuff [5:23]
- Parenting [6:51]
- Truthlessness in Advertising [2:37]
- Businessmen [1:26]
- Religion [2:06]
- Atheism [8:37]

=== History ===
- You Are All Diseased was recorded in the Beacon Theater in New York City
- Eardrum Records / Atlantic Recording Corporation / Wea International Inc.
- Location sound by Terry Kulchar. Edited by Mike Stone. Mastered by Steve Hall at Future Disc, Hollywood CA

== Citations ==
- “George Carlin.” Encyclopædia Britannica, Encyclopædia Britannica, inc., 18 June 2024, www.britannica.com/biography/George-Carlin.
- Itzkoff, Dave. “The Strange Afterlife of George Carlin.” The New York Times, The New York Times, 11 May 2022, www.nytimes.com/2022/05/11/arts/george-carlin-comedy.html.
- Watkins, Mel, and Bruce Weber. “George Carlin, Comic Who Chafed at Society and Its Constraints, Dies at 71.” The New York Times, The New York Times, 24 June 2008, www.nytimes.com/2008/06/24/arts/24carlin.html.
- George Carlin - Quotes, Death & 7 Words, www.biography.com/actors/george-carlin. Accessed 2 Aug. 2024.
- Admin. “George Carlin: You Are All Diseased (1999) - Transcript.” Scraps from the Loft, 25 June 2021, scrapsfromtheloft.com/comedy/george-carlin-you-are-all-diseased-transcript/.
- “You Are All Diseased (1999).” You Are All Diseased (1999) - Georgecarlin.Net, www.georgecarlin.net/discog/diseased.html. Accessed 1 Aug. 2024.
