= Little David Records =

- Parent company: Warner Music Group
- Founded: 1969
- Founder: Flip Wilson; Monte Kay
- Defunct: 1980
- Distributors: Independent (1970–1971); Atlantic Records (1971–1974); Warner Bros. Records (1974–1975); Atlantic Records (1975–1980)
- Genre: Comedy, jazz, soft rock
- Country of origin: U.S.

Little David Records was a record label started in 1969 by up-and-coming comedian Flip Wilson and his manager, veteran jazz producer Monte Kay. The label focused mainly on comedy albums, with some jazz and soft rock releases. Little David was independently distributed for its first year but was picked up by Atlantic Records for most of its existence, except for a year under Warner Bros. Records.

The label's logo depicted biblical David wielding a sling, ready to fight Goliath.

The small label produced two Grammy Award-winning comedy albums, and five Gold records to become highly profitable. Kay and Wilson parted ways in 1977. The label was sold to comedian George Carlin, who folded the catalog into Eardrum Records in the 1980s.

== Founding ==
Comedian Flip Wilson hired Monte Kay as his manager in 1963 when Wilson was 30 and Kay was 39. Kay was known for founding the jazz club Birdland in 1949. He had been producing jazz records, and managing jazz musicians ever since. Kay booked Wilson at comedy clubs in New York City and Los Angeles, and in 1965 he arranged for Wilson to appear on The Tonight Show with Johnny Carson. Wilson had already released a few comedy albums, the last two with Atlantic Records, but he was interested in taking greater control. In 1969, Kay and Wilson co-founded Little David Records to release new albums, starting with The Devil Made Me Buy This Dress (named for a comedy line spoken by Wilson's character Geraldine), and to sign other comedians and musicians. Released in February 1970, The Devil Made Me Buy This Dress won the 1970 Grammy Award for Best Comedy Recording at the 13th Annual Grammy Awards held in March 1971. The album was certified Gold on July 22, 1970.

The name "Little David" referred to Wilson's son David, who was named for the biblical David, the giantkiller. Wilson had been using a reference to David and Goliath for a couple of years in his comedy routines, jokingly describing the ancient David as "Little David", a pop singer and a teen heartthrob. The Little David label releases featured a logo capturing a moment in the Bible story: David winding up with his sling to make the fatal blow. Kay's daughter said years later that the logo fit Kay very well because he "loved to help people who he thought were outside the mainstream." A pink background was used on some label series; green on others.

Kay and Wilson put together a television special in 1969, called The Flip Wilson Special. The special led to NBC signing Wilson to a comedy and variety series called The Flip Wilson Show. Kay served as executive producer on the popular show, which rated number 2 in its time slot for two of its four years.

Also in 1970, Kay and Wilson met comedian George Carlin in the course of Carlin appearing on The Flip Wilson Show. Carlin was subsequently hired to write for the show, and then he was signed to Little David. The label recorded Carlin's live performances at Washington DC's The Cellar Door over two nights in July 1971—this collection was released as FM & AM in January 1972. The album won the 1972 Grammy Award for Best Comedy Recording at the 15th Annual Grammy Awards held in March 1973, and its sales were strong. Eight months after its release, the album was certified Gold. Carlin also changed his artist management to Little David general manager Jack Lewis, who matched Carlin's wild personality.

Initially, the label was distributed over a network of independent labels. In December 1971, Atlantic Records signed a distribution deal with Little David. The artist roster at that time consisted of comedians Wilson and Carlin, and singers Kenny Rankin and Dan Cassidy. Rankin and Cassidy first met at Phoenix House, a drug rehabilitation community in Manhattan. Cassidy had been a copy writer and seaman but learned to play guitar while staying at Phoenix House.

The staff at the label was kept small, with only three executives on board by 1972. Co-founder Wilson did not work in the office because of his performance schedule. The executives running Little David were Monte Kay as president, Jack Lewis as general manager, and Ben Hurwitz who worked out of a New York office to cover the East Coast, as well as serving as the label's liaison to Atlantic Records. Joni Juster covered label promotion liaison duties, and Evelyn Levin managed Kay's artist management business.

== Success ==
The success of The Flip Wilson Show made fortunes for Wilson and Kay. The comedy records released by Little David cost little to make, sold very well, and were profitable for the label. In early 1972, Kay bought Motown executive Berry Gordy's Hollywood mansion and threw a large party for Little David Records. Stevie Wonder, Noel Redding and Jackie DeShannon played for the guests, who included the Rolling Stones, singer Helen Reddy and Atlantic Records executive Ahmet Ertegun. Reddy had just recorded the song "Peaceful", written by Rankin.

In 1972, Kay signed comedians Jack Burns and Avery Schreiber. Burns was an early partner of Carlin; both Burns and Schreiber had previously partnered in the comedy troupe The Second City. The Burns & Schreiber team was revived and they recorded two albums. The first, Pure B.S.!, was held back until June 1973 because Little David wanted to capitalize on President Richard Nixon's Watergate scandal, which was a major news story. Burns, Schreiber and other comics taped The Watergate Comedy Hour on May 8, 1973, in front of a studio audience. Atlantic Records registered their disapproval of the album one week later, but it was quickly picked up by Capitol Records, who produced a first pressing of 100,000 copies at the end of May, labeled as Hidden Records. By mid-July, the Watergate album had reached number 66 on the Billboard Hot 100. Eventually, Atlantic relented, and Little David taped another performance of The Watergate Comedy Hour with only slight differences from the earlier one. The second performance was released by Little David in 1975, but it was after Nixon resigned the presidency in August 1974, and the story was no longer topical.

In mid-June 1972, Cassidy appeared on The Tonight Show with Carlin, during a week in which Johnny Carson was on vacation, and Wilson was guest-hosting the show. Cassidy also opened for Carlin on some tour dates. Cassidy's music career never took off, however. Later, he founded an Irish studies program at New College of California. Otherwise, the artists on the label's roster generally helped each other achieve success. Rankin appeared with Carlin on The Tonight Show in June 1972, and he toured with Carlin as his opening act.

In 1973, young "jazz comedian" Franklyn Ajaye appeared on The Flip Wilson Show. Eventually Ajaye was signed to the label and he recorded his third album, Don't Smoke Dope, Fry Your Hair, in 1977. Ajaye served as Rankin's opening act during periods when Carlin was not touring. At Little David, Ajaye had almost no interaction with label mate Carlin; Ajaye said that the most he spoke with Carlin was during the few days when Carlin was filming his part for the 1976 film Car Wash, in which Ajaye starred but made less money than Carlin.

In October 1974, Warner Bros. Records (a division of Warner Music Group) announced that they would be distributing Little David's releases, taking over from Atlantic. Warner took out a full page advertisement in Billboard magazine; the ad quoted the Bible passage 2 Samuel 6:5 which described David playing various musical instruments in praise. The Modern Jazz Quartet had recently been signed to Little David, and their new album was to be distributed by Warner, along with a new album by Rankin. Atlantic struck a new deal in August 1975, restoring their earlier distribution arrangement.

In 1976, Kay signed jazz trumpeter Nat Adderley. Adderley recorded just one album for Little David, released as Hummin' in 1976. As well, the tune "Hummin'" was released as a 45 rpm single, with "The Traveller" on the B-side.

== Final years ==
Wilson was wealthy by 1974 when The Flip Wilson Show stopped airing after four seasons. He retired out of the public eye for a few years, recording in 1975 a serious political song released as his first single titled "Berries in Salinas", which presented views in support of migrant farm workers' rights.

After a few years, Wilson began to suspect Kay of mismanaging his money. In April 1977, Wilson entered the modest two-story Little David offices on Sunset Boulevard in Hollywood and poured gallons of white paint on the carpet and furniture in five rooms. Kay and Wilson hired attorneys to dissolve the partnership, a process which took many months because of the complexity of the contracts and holdings.

Meanwhile, Carlin's album Toledo Window Box was certified Gold in May 1977, two-and-a-half years after it was released. This was Carlin's fourth Gold record in a row, and his last with Little David. He released a "Best of" album in 1979, called Indecent Exposure.

Carlin recorded and released 1981's A Place for My Stuff under Atlantic Records, not Little David. He partnered with Jerry Hamza to form the custom label Eardrum Records as a subdivision of Atlantic. Carlin on Campus was released on Eardrum in 1984. Hamza and Carlin then bought the entire Little David catalog so they could reissue Carlin's earlier albums.

== Legacy ==
Kay said in 1972 that he thought Laugh-In comedian Lily Tomlin was signed quickly by Polydor Records because Polydor wanted to emulate the Gold record success of Little David's first album: Wilson's The Devil Made Me Buy This Dress. Tomlin's album This Is a Recording took the Best Comedy Recording Grammy in 1972.

Kay died in 1988, and Wilson in 1998. In 1999 under the direction of Carlin and Hamza, Atlantic released six of Carlin's albums, plus some previously unreleased material, in a box set titled The Little David Years (1971–1977). In the early 2000s, Carlin contacted Rankin to sell him back the masters to his Little David albums. Rather than charging a high price as was music industry practice, Carlin charged Rankin only one dollar. Carlin died in June 2008, and Rankin died one year later.

== Albums ==
Sortable table
Label number	Album name	Artist	Release date	Gold certification date	Awards
LD 1000	The Devil Made Me Buy This Dress	Flip Wilson	1970	July 22, 1970	Grammy Award for Best Comedy Recording
LD 1001	Geraldine/Don't Fight the Feeling	Flip Wilson	1972		
LD 1002	Dan Cassidy	Dan Cassidy	1972		
LD 1003	Like a Seed	Kenny Rankin	1972		
LD 1004	Class Clown	George Carlin	1973	June 13, 1973	
LD 1005	Occupation: Foole	George Carlin	1973	December 27, 1976	
LD 1006	Pure B.S.!	Burns & Schreiber	1973		
LD 1007	Wide Wide World of War	The Committee	1973		
LD 1008	An Evening with Wally Londo Featuring Bill Slaszo	George Carlin	1975		
LD 1009	Inside	Kenny Rankin	1975		
LD 1010	The Watergate Comedy Hour	Burns & Schreiber	1975		
LD 1011	Don't Smoke Dope, Fry Your Hair	Franklyn Ajaye	1977		
LD 1012	Hummin'	Nat Adderley and the Basic Black Band	1977		
LD 1013	The Kenny Rankin Album	Kenny Rankin	1977		
LD 1075	On the Road	George Carlin	1977		
LD 1076	Indecent Exposure: Some of the Best of George Carlin	George Carlin	1979		
LD 1079	An Evening with Two Grand Pianos	Hank Jones & John Lewis	1980		
LD 2000	The Flip Wilson Show	Flip Wilson	1970		
LD 3000	Silver Morning	Kenny Rankin	1974		
LD 3001	In Memoriam	Modern Jazz Quartet	1974		
LD 3003	Toledo Window Box	George Carlin	1974	May 17, 1977	
LD 7214	FM & AM	George Carlin	1972	September 27, 1972	Grammy Award for Best Comedy Recording

== See also ==
- List of record labels
