= FM & AM =

Live album by George Carlin
- Released: January 27, 1972
- Recorded: June 25–26, 1971
- Venues: The Cellar Door, Washington D.C.
- Genre: Comedy
- Length: 50:55
- Label: Little David Records
- Producers: Monte Kay, Jack Lewis

George Carlin chronology
Take-Offs and Put-Ons (1967)	FM & AM (1972)	Class Clown (1972)

Professional ratings
Review scores
Source	Rating
Allmusic	5/5 stars

FM & AM is the third album by American comedian George Carlin. This album was originally released in 1972 on the Atlantic Records subsidiary label Little David Records, later reissued on Carlin's Eardrum Records label. It was also included as part of the 1992 Classic Gold collection, and The Little David Years (1971–1977) box set.

== Overview ==
The album incorporates (and mocks) the "clean cut" act Carlin performed on The Ed Sullivan Show on its "AM" side (in monaural), while featuring the counterculture material he was becoming known for on its "FM" side (in stereo with Carlin on the left channel and the audience on the right). Carlin's official website refers to the album as a sort of comedy concept album and says that it "marked Carlin's metamorphosis from straight-laced to hippie, intentionally embracing the growing counterculture." In his memoirs Last Words, Carlin describes it as having a "clear concept" whereas Occupation: Foole and Class Clown as having "Strong concepts".

FM & AM won the Grammy Award for Best Comedy Album.

== Chart performance ==
The album debuted on Billboard magazine's Top LP's & Tape chart (renamed just that week), in the issue dated February 19, 1972, peaking at No. 13 during a thirty-five-week run on the chart.

== Track listing ==
=== Side one (FM) ===
1. Shoot – 5:55
2. The Hair Piece – 2:53
3. Sex in Commercials – 5:20
4. Drugs – 4:23
5. Birth Control – 5:10

=== Side two (AM) ===
1. Son of WINO – 6:31
2. Divorce Game – 4:29
3. Ed Sullivan Self Taught – 3:26
4. Let's Make a Deal – 4:48
5. The 11 O'Clock News – 7:10

== Charts ==
Chart (1972)	Peak position
US Billboard Top LPs & Tape	13
