= The Devil Made Me Buy This Dress =

Studio album by Flip Wilson
- Released: February 1970
- Genre: Comedy
- Label: Little David Records
- Producers: Monte Kay, Jack Lewis

Flip Wilson chronology
You Devil You (1968)	The Devil Made Me Buy This Dress (1970)	The Flip Wilson Show (1970)

Professional ratings
Review scores
Source	Rating
Allmusic	5/5 stars

The Devil Made Me Buy This Dress is the fourth comedy album by American comedian Flip Wilson, and the first record released by Little David Records, a boutique label that Wilson co-founded with his manager Monte Kay. Featuring material written by Wilson, it was his most successful album—his highest-charting album, his only Gold record and his only Grammy Award. Wilson introduces for the first time on a comedy album his character Geraldine Jones, who delivers a retort to form the title of the album.

== Geraldine ==
The character Geraldine was first introduced by name on Labor Day, September 1, 1969, in a television special put together by Wilson, his manager Kay, and NBC executives. The show was called The Flip Wilson Special, and its success led to Wilson's variety show called The Flip Wilson Show, first broadcast September 22, 1970. Wilson first performed the specific routine of Geraldine defending her new dress on The Ed Sullivan Show on January 11, 1970. In the routine, Wilson takes on the persona of a preacher's wife. The wife (Geraldine) explains to her angry husband why she has an expensive new dress, telling him that "the devil made me buy this dress." She describes how the devil followed her on the street, flattered her with praise, showed her the dress in a shop window, pressed her into the shop, and then forced her to sign the preacher's name to a check. The preacher is doubtful; he says that she is too quick to blame the devil, for instance the time she rammed the car into the side of the church. She counters by saying that, at the time of the car accident, she was trying to wrest control of the steering wheel away from the devil, and she was also trying to kick the devil, which prevented her from using the brake pedal.

== Reception ==
The Devil Made Me Buy This Dress entered the Billboard charts at No. 200 on February 28, 1970. It rose to No. 24 on the Billboard R&B album charts in the U.S., and reached No. 17 on the Billboard 200. The album was certified Gold on July 22, 1970. It won the 1970 Grammy Award for Best Comedy Recording at the 13th Annual Grammy Awards held in March 1971. The record was distributed independently until December 1971, when Atlantic Records signed a distribution deal with Little David.

== Production ==
Veteran producer Monte Kay, president of Little David, joined with general manager Jack Lewis to produce the album. Sid Maurer was hired as art director. Audio engineer Gene Radice edited the recording, and Shelly Katz took photographs for the cover art. Licensing for public performance of the album was through BMI.

== Track listing ==
=== Side one ===
1. Great Quotations – 2:15
2. The Devil Made Me Buy This Dress – 4:00
3. Miss Johnson – 2:55
4. The Great Motor Bike and Tennis Shoe Race, Honey – 3:10
5. The Go-Rilla – 7:00

=== Side two ===
1. Monologue Number One (Wardrobe Lady, Pt. I – Drive-In Movie – Lemonade Stand – Golf Story) – 6:00
2. Monologue Number Two (Wardrobe Lady, Pt. II – Doctors Have More Fun) – 3:40
3. Ice – 2:58
4. Ruby Begonia – 2:00
5. Monologue Number Three (Seeing Ed Eat A Chittlin' On Network Television – The Pet Shop) – 2:45
