= It's Bad for Ya =

It's Bad For Ya

Live album by George Carlin
- Released: July 29, 2008
- Recorded: March 1, 2008
- Venue: Wells Fargo Center for the Arts; Santa Rosa, California
- Genre: Comedy
- Length: 67:00
- Label: Eardrum/Atlantic
- Producer: George Carlin

George Carlin chronology
Life Is Worth Losing (2006)	It's Bad For Ya (2008)	I Kinda Like It When a Lotta People Die (2016)

It's Bad for Ya is the 19th album as well as the 14th and final HBO stand-up comedy special by stand-up comedian George Carlin, released on July 29th, 2008, through Eardrum and Atlantic Records. It was the last album recorded within Carlin's lifetime, being first televised live on March 1, 2008, on HBO, less than four months before his death. It is also the first posthumous album from Carlin, being released just over a month after Carlin's death on June 22.

The album is the follow-up to the 2005 HBO special Life Is Worth Losing. Carlin worked on this material since ending his Life Is Worth Losing tour. The working title for this show was The Parade of Useless Bullshit.

Filmed in the Wells Fargo Center for the Arts in Santa Rosa, California, the show's stage behind Carlin was designed to represent a cozy living room theme. The CD was released July 29, 2008, and the DVD and Blu-ray Disc on November 25, 2008.

It's Bad for Ya received the Grammy Award for Best Comedy Album, awarded posthumously.

Professional ratings
Review scores
Source	Rating
Allmusic	link
The Second Supper	link

== Track listing ==
1. "Opening" – 1:30
2. "Old Fuck" – 3:45
3. "Goin' Through My Address Book" – 2:52
4. "Things We Say When People Die" – 2:36
5. "He's Smiling Down" – 2:11
6. "Parents in Hell" – 1:08
7. "People Refuse to Be Realistic" – 1:10
8. "Dead Parents Helping" – 3:59
9. "A Couple of Other Questions" – 1:04
10. "Today's Professional Parents" – 5:48
11. "The Self-Esteem Movement" – 1:16
12. "Every Child Is Special" – 1:42
13. "Children Are Our Future" – 0:39
14. "Raisin' a Child Is Not Difficult" – 0:42
15. "I Like People" – 0:51
16. "Stupid Bullshit" – 3:12
17. "Stupid Bullshit on the Phone" – 2:33
18. "What a Phone Call Should Be" – 0:54
19. "In a Coma" – 0:49
20. "Their Kids!" – 1:09
21. "They Want to Show You the Pictures" – 4:29
22. "Just Enough Bullshit" – 1:33
23. "No One Questions Things" – 2:55
24. "Proud to Be an American" – 1:47
25. "God Bless America" – 2:59
26. "Takin' Off Yer Hat" – 3:04
27. "Swearing on the Bible" – 4:23
28. "You Have No Rights" – 5:14

== Award and nominations ==
The live HBO performance special was nominated for an Emmy Award for Outstanding Variety, Music, or Comedy Special at the 60th Primetime Emmy Awards. It lost to Mr. Warmth: The Don Rickles Project.

The audio recording of the special won the Grammy Award for Best Comedy Album in the 51st Grammy Awards.

== Charts ==
Chart (2008)	Peak position
US Billboard Top Comedy Albums Chart	2
US Billboard Top Independent Albums Chart	32
