= I Kinda Like It When a Lotta People Die =

Live album by George Carlin
- Released: September 16, 2016
- Recorded: 1957 (Boston Rant); June 23, 2001 (Bonus track); September 9 & 10, 2001 (Main show); 2016 (Interviews)
- Genre: Comedy
- Length: 56:18
- Label: Eardrum/MPI Media
- Producer: George Carlin

George Carlin chronology
| It's Bad for Ya (2008) | I Kinda Like It When a Lotta People Die (2016) |

I Kinda Like It When a Lotta People Die is the 20th and final album by American stand-up comedian George Carlin, released posthumously on September 16, 2016.

The album opens with an unreleased home recording from 1957, and proceeds with live recordings from shows Carlin performed at the MGM Grand Las Vegas on the nights of September 9 and 10, 2001. In the set's 10-minute closer, "Uncle Dave", Carlin explains why he likes "big, fatal disasters with lots of dead people", asking: "Y'know what's the best thing I can hear on television? 'We interrupt this program' ... y'know the worst thing I can hear? 'No one was hurt' ... I'm always rooting for a really high death toll, that's why I like natural disasters." He goes on to list the pros and cons of various natural disasters, culminating in a doomsday scenario in which Earth collapses and "trillions" of disgruntled "Uncle Daves" everywhere are finally happy. An earlier joke in the set includes reference to Osama bin Laden and an exploding airplane.

Carlin planned to use the material at the taping of his next HBO special in November, which was to be titled "I Kinda Like It When a Lotta People Die". The special was shelved due to the September 11 attacks the very next day, in which nearly 3,000 people died in airplane hijacking attacks orchestrated by al-Qaeda. Carlin abandoned much of the set, including the closer; the renamed special, Complaints and Grievances, was recorded at the Beacon Theatre in November. The original title was planned to be re-used for a special in 2005 but was again discarded due to Hurricane Katrina. The special, Life Is Worth Losing, features a re-worked version of "Uncle Dave" titled "Coast-to-Coast Emergency".

The original September 2001 set was lost until cassette recordings were discovered in Carlin's archives. The material was arranged as an album by Carlin's daughter Kelly, his long-time manager and confidant Jerry Hamza, and archivist Logan Heftel, and features liner notes written by comedian Lewis Black, plus interviews with Hamza and Carlin's long-time comedy special producer Rocco Urbisci. The album streamed on SiriusXM's Comedy Greats channel hosted by Ron Bennington two weeks prior to its release.

== Track listing ==
| No. | Title | Length |
|---|---|---|
| 1. | "Boston Rant 1957" | 5:36 |
| 2. | "Rats and Squealers" | 6:58 |
| 3. | "Cocaine" | 0:27 |
| 4. | "The Fecal Differential" | 3:12 |
| 5. | "Tired of Songs" | 3:23 |
| 6. | "The First Enema" | 5:26 |
| 7. | "Uncle Dave" | 9:46 |
| 8. | "Jerry Hamza Interview" (bonus track) | 7:57 |
| 9. | "Rocco Urbisci Interview" (bonus track) | 4:55 |
| 10. | "I Kinda Like It When a Lotta People Die, 6-23-2001" (bonus track) | 8:38 |

== Charts ==
| Chart (2016) | Peak position |
|---|---|
| US Billboard 200 | 176 |
