= Eardrum (disambiguation) =

Eardrum, a thin membrane that separates the external ear from the middle ear.

Eardrum may also refer to:

- Eardrum (album), an album by Talib Kweli
- Eardrum Records, a record label
