= Complaints and Grievances =

Live album by George Carlin
- Released: December 11, 2001
- Recorded: November 17, 2001
- Venue: Beacon Theatre, New York City
- Genre: Comedy
- Length: 56:16
- Label: Eardrum/Atlantic
- Producer: George Carlin

George Carlin chronology
The Little David Years (1971–1977) (1999)	Complaints and Grievances (2001)	Life Is Worth Losing (2006)

Complaints and Grievances is the 17th album and 12th HBO stand-up special by comedian George Carlin. It was nominated for the 2003 Grammy Award for Best Spoken Comedy Album.

Professional ratings
Review scores
Source	Rating
Allmusic	3/5 stars

== Production ==
The working title of the show was I Kinda Like It When a Lot of People Die, but it was changed after the September 11 2001 attacks. In an interview on Opie and Anthony on October 24, 2001, Carlin explained:

It's gonna be good, though. It's a strong show. I had to make a few alterations 'cause—you wanna hear the name of what the show was called and I'm telling you the truth? ... The name of it was I Kinda Like It When a Lot of People Die. Yeah. And it was all about natural disasters and stuff and I had a nice nine minute piece on that but the morning I woke up and saw the special effects thing on the TV I thought "Oh yeah. Oh. Change. Changing the name."

After briefly explaining the nature of the show, Carlin added, "Everything's the same, except I had to take that piece out. I just knew ... no-one would laugh. You know. Obviously."

Complaints and Grievances was recorded live at the Beacon Theatre in New York City on November 17, 2001, and was broadcast live on HBO.

== Legacy ==
Cassette recordings of the original working version of the show, recorded in Las Vegas on September 9 and 10, 2001, were discovered in the 2010s and released in 2016 as I Kinda Like It When a Lotta People Die. The album includes the routine removed from Complaints and Grievances, titled "Uncle Dave". A recording of the first performance of the routine from June 2001 is also included as a bonus track, under its original title of "I Kinda Like It When a Lotta People Die". Portions of this routine were later reused for "Coast-to-Coast Emergency", the closing bit from Carlin's 2005 special Life Is Worth Losing.

== Track listing ==
All tracks by George Carlin.

1. "The Opening" – 9:22
2. "Traffic Accidents: Keep Movin'!" – 6:16
3. "You and Me (Things That Come Off of Your Body)" – 10:38
4. "People Who Oughta Be Killed: Self-Help Books" – 1:16
5. "Motivation Seminars" – 1:05
6. "Parents of Honor Students" – 2:15
7. "Baby Slings" – 0:59
8. "My Daddy" – 0:51
9. "Telephone Mimes" – 1:09
10. "Hands-Free Telephone Headsets" – 0:38
11. "Answering Machines" – 0:52
12. "Family Newsletters" – 1:23
13. "Music on Answering Machines" – 1:39
14. "People Who Wear Visors" – 0:39
15. "Singers with One Name" – 0:41
16. "Rich Guys in Hot Air Balloons" – 1:01
17. "People Who Misuse Credit Cards" – 0:51
18. "Guys Named Todd" – 1:30
19. "Gun Enthusiasts" – 1:26
20. "White Guys Who Shave Their Heads" – 0:48
21. "NASA-Holes" – 1:32
22. "Why We Don't Need 10 Commandments" – 7:14

== Personnel ==
- George Carlin – writing, production
- Greg Calbi – editing, mastering
- Terry Kulchar – location sound
- Winston Smith – illustration
- Dan Dion – photography
- JDK – art direction
