= Geraldine Jones =

Geraldine Jones may refer to:

- Geraldine Jones (character), a recurring comedy persona of Flip Wilson
- Geraldine Jones, the first woman president of the Oxford Union (in 1968), and later panellist on the BBC Radio 4 show Just a Minute.
