= Daniel Cassidy =

American writer

- Born: 1943
- Died: October 11, 2008 (aged 64–65); San Francisco, California, US
- Education: Cornell University
- Occupations: Writer, filmmaker, musician
- Employer: New York Times
- Notable work: How the Irish Invented Slang
- Spouse: Clare McIntyre (m. 1983)
- Awards: American Book Awards; 2007 How the Irish Invented Slang – non-fiction
- Musical career
- Instruments: Reeds, singing
- Label: Little David

Daniel Cassidy (1943 – October 11, 2008) was an American writer, filmmaker, musician, and academic. He is known for his 2007 book How the Irish Invented Slang in which he suggests that many American slang words are of Irish origin. His theories have, however, not stood up to academic scrutiny and are considered factually incorrect.

== Biography ==
Cassidy grew up in Queens and on Long Island in New York. He was the son of a Navy chief petty officer. He graduated from New York Military Academy on a full scholarship and studied English literature and creative writing at Cornell University. Cassidy worked for The New York Times as a news assistant. His work appeared in the San Francisco Chronicle, The New York Observer and the Atlantic Monthly.

He was a professional musician, starting as a reed player, and cutting an album as a singer and composer. He played Carnegie Hall, the Civic Auditorium, and The Tonight Show – performing with comedian George Carlin, Kenny Rankin, and Lilly Tomlin.

Cassidy married Clare McIntyre, in 1983.

In 1995, he founded and co-directed the Irish Studies program at New College of California. In 2007 The magazine Irish America designated him as being among the most influential Irish Americans of the year.

Cassidy died of pancreatic cancer at his home in San Francisco.

== Irish slang ==
In his 2007 book How the Irish Invented Slang, Cassidy maintains that many common American slang words are of Irish origin, with the word dude for example being derived from "dúid" (meaning "foolish-looking fellow") and snazzy coming from "snasach" (meaning "polished, elegant"). Among other hundreds of other words he mentions are jazz, poker, sucker, and scam. Cassidy proposes that since Irish immigrants were a marginalized group their influence on English would mainly be found in lower-status or colloquial slang expressions, leading them to be overlooked by mainstream dictionaries.

The book won the 2007 American Book Awards for non-fiction.

His etymological theories have not stood up to academic scrutiny and are considered factually incorrect and wishful thinking. The book relies almost entirely on phonetic similarity, finding coincidences where sound and meaning happen to look similar. It did not include historical analysis. Among those who have criticized his theories as being completely wrong are American lexicographer Grant Barrett and Irish lexicographer Terence Dolan, Professor of Old and Middle English at University College Dublin.

Cassidy could speak no Irish when beginning this project.

== Other works ==
=== Documentary films ===
- Civil Rights and Civil Wrongs
- Uncensored Voices

=== Albums ===
- "Dan Cassidy" was released by Little David Records (LD 1002) in 1972. Billboard said, "Dan Cassidy projects an immense strength and a rare understanding of the human predicament circa early 1970s on this his initial album effort. He's seen his share of the unpretty side of life and his lyrics reflect this with the utmost sincerity and compassion."
