= Life Is Worth Losing =

Live album by George Carlin
- Released: January 10, 2006
- Recorded: November 5, 2005
- Venue: Beacon Theatre, New York City
- Genre: Comedy
- Length: 71:20
- Label: Eardrum/Atlantic
- Producer: George Carlin

George Carlin chronology
Complaints and Grievances (2001)	Life Is Worth Losing (2006)	It's Bad for Ya (2008)

Professional ratings
Review scores
Source	Rating
AllMusic	3.5/5 stars

Life Is Worth Losing is the 18th album and 13th HBO special by American comedian George Carlin. It was recorded simultaneously with the live broadcast of the special and was his final special recorded at the Beacon Theatre.

The special was the first project Carlin had undertaken since completing drug rehabilitation in 2005. Early on in the program, Carlin announced that he was 341 days sober at the time of the recording, and that 2006 would be his 50th year in show business. Much of the material in the special focuses on topics such as torture, depression, suicide and genocide, and the stage is adorned with tombstones. Carlin later revealed that he had been suffering from heart failure during the recording of the special and was subsequently hospitalized for a short time afterward.

Portions of "Coast-to-Coast Emergency" were originally part of a routine titled "Uncle Dave", intended for a planned 2001 Carlin special to be titled I Kinda Like It When a Lotta People Die, which was reworked after the September 11 attacks and retitled Complaints and Grievances. A live recording of "Uncle Dave" was later issued on the 2016 posthumous release I Kinda Like It When a Lotta People Die, derived from cassette tapes from Carlin's personal collection.

Life Is Worth Losing was nominated for Best Comedy Album at the 49th Annual Grammy Awards, but lost to Lewis Black's The Carnegie Hall Performance. A DVD of the special was released on February 27, 2007, by MPI Home Video.

== Track listing ==
1. "A Modern Man" – 3:53
2. "Three Little Words" – 3:51
3. "The Suicide Guy" – 7:06
4. "Extreme Human Behavior" – 13:41
5. "The All-Suicide TV Channel" – 3:13
6. "Dumb Americans" – 10:57
7. "Pyramid of the Hopeless" – 8:43
8. "Autoerotic Asphyxia" – 4:54
9. "Posthumous Female Transplants" – 3:34
10. "Yeast Infection" – 4:38
11. "Coast-to-Coast Emergency" – 6:50

== Charts ==
Chart (2005)	Peak position
US Billboard Top Comedy Albums Chart	4
