= New College of California =

Private college in California (1971–2008)

Coordinates: 37.7606°N 122.4212°W

- Type: Private College
- Active: 1971–2008
- Location: San Francisco, California, United States
- Campus: Urban
- Website: http://www.newcollege.edu (informational only)

New College of California was a college founded in the San Francisco Bay Area in 1971 by former Gonzaga University President John Leary. It ceased operations in early 2008.

New College's main campus was housed in several buildings in the Mission District in San Francisco. The offices at 777 Valencia Street and companion buildings across the street were home to its humanities-based programs, including the Humanities BA, Mathematics, Poetics, Writing and Consciousness, Media Studies, Graduate Psychology, Experimental Performance Institute, Women’s Spirituality MA, Humanities and Leadership, Activism and Social Change, the Teacher Credential Program, as well as a broadcast studio and administration offices. New College of California School of Law was located at 50 Fell Street in the city's Civic Center. The North Bay Campus in Culture, Ecology and Sustainable Community was housed in Santa Rosa, California, in a building owned by the Arlene Francis Foundation, a private foundation run by Peter Gabel, former president of New College and Arlene Francis's son. The Science and Math Institute classes were initially held at the building at 50 Fell Street then morphed online to become part of the Southern California University of Health Sciences in Whittier, California, within 12 miles (19 km) of downtown Los Angeles.

== History ==
The college was founded in 1971 by John Leary, who previously served as the president of Gonzaga University. A year earlier, while serving as the Vice President for University Relations at Santa Clara University, Leary first proposed the idea for an experimental college centered around Socratic Seminars. The idea was rejected by Santa Clara's administration, but served as the foundation for the New College of California, which Leary established with departing Santa Clara professor Bob Raines.

The New College began with approximately a dozen students enrolling in classes held in Leary's living room in Sausalito. Leary convinced various acquaintances of his to help fund this endeavor, and used this money to hire faculty. The following year, Leary moved the school's classes to a warehouse he purchased in Sausalito. By 1973, a tuition strike had engulfed the school, creating a deficit, and causing the school's trustees to pressure Leary for administrative and financial reform. Instead, Leary resigned in 1974, and was replaced by Les Carr.

The college moved to 777 Valencia in San Francisco in 1975. The college was accredited by the Western Association of Schools and Colleges (WASC) in 1976. In 1978, local newspapers uncovered that Carr had been selling Honorary PhD degrees for $25,000, and was subsequently fired. In place of Carr, Martin Hamilton, Mildred Henry, and Peter Gabel took over as "collaborative leadership". WASC issued a warning to the school in 1980, and placed the school on probation in 1984, citing concerns of the school's curriculum.

The association re-affirmed the school's accreditation in 1985, but issued the school another warning in 1988 due to concerns regarding governance, faculty and finances. In 1996, some of the school's staff, including the faculty for the law school, humanities program, and poetry program, unionized, leading to modest economic gains, but no significant change regarding college governance.

In 2002, Martin Hamilton took over as the school's president. The same year, WASC reported that the school did not have stable revenue, adequate financial controls, and suffered from "extremely serious management problems". WASC issued another warning in 2005, noting concerns about the college's long-term financial stability. In 2006, it was revealed that the school's founder, John Leary, sexually abused minors while president of Gonzaga University.

=== Activism ===
Throughout the college's history, groups of faculty, students, alumni and staff mounted challenges to the school's governance system, but these efforts failed to achieve lasting change. Numerous campaigns by faculty groups seeking reform, often regarding specific academic programs, had no more than limited, short-term influence. Several waves of students organized throughout the college's history, addressing a variety of issues, as well as a greater voice in the college's administration. Student efforts, which sometimes included complaints to WASC, were also unable to achieve lasting change.

=== 2007 WASC investigation ===
In June 2007, the Western Association of Schools and Colleges (WASC) after years of accreditation, approvals and recertifications, launched an investigation into New College which obliquely alleged that the school suffered from poor record keeping, flawed financial controls and inadequate curricula, and that President Hamilton was corrupt and engaged in a number of conflicts of interest.

The report cited a number of incidents, such as one where a scammer posing as an international student requested class credits in exchange for a large financial gift which never materialized, and another where the school's administration couldn't explain course requirements and specific content of its "Pilot Hybrid Leadership in Urban Transformed Environments" program. As a result, the association put the school on probation.

During the week of July 16, 2007, New College held a school-wide faculty meeting. The full-time faculty formed a Core Faculty Council, which met and gave a vote of no confidence in Hamilton. The part-time faculty formed an Adjunct Faculty Council, and the students formed a Student Council. Alumni and alumnae decided to form an Independent Alumni/ae Association. The report sparked protests by students and faculty alike, who pressured Hamilton into resigning on August 2.

Though initially Hamilton remained on the board after his resignation, he was forced out, along with Gabel. In his resignation letter, Hamilton claimed that criticism of his administration was due to New College being held to an unfairly high standard and said that criticisms of the school were "petty". After WASC imposed sanctions against the college, the school's faculty tried to move toward greater accountability by forming a college-wide Faculty Council, an effort that drew praise from the association.

WASC credited the Faculty Council and the school's new academic leadership for making improvements in the academic affairs of the college. Adjunct faculty, students and alumni also formed new organizations seeking change.

=== Financial collapse ===
After Hamilton's resignation, Luis Molina, an attorney who served on the school's board of trustees was inaugurated as the college's interim president. Francisco Leite, a former university administrator from Brazil who Martin Hamilton met while contracting an exchange program with UNAES, became Chief Financial Officer. Molina stated he was working with the school's other board members to earn back the school's accreditation. Molina also promised to reform the school's governance, as students and faculty complained that all real administrative power lay in the hands of Hamilton and his confidants. Molina's interim administration hired an educational consultant to help bring the college into compliance with accreditation standards of WASC, an effort which drew praise from faculty and the association.

After WASC's report, the school's enrollment consequently fell to less than 600; finances of course only worsened, unpaid utility bills prompted Pacific Gas and Electric Co. threaten to turn the school's power off, the Department of Education alleged that the school illegally mishandled scholarships and other aid money, and federal loans and grants were withheld due to unfilled paperwork.

By the end of 2007, the United States Department of Education (DOE) placed the college on heightened cash monitoring after discovering improprieties in the financial aid office, preventing financial aid funds from being disbursed until after New College's paperwork passed a review. The financial aid staff hired by Molina and Leite were unable to fix the files to conform to DOE standards, and DOE investigation also revealed that the school failed to keep required records and could not account for large amounts of federal financial aid funds. As a result, DOE revoked New College's eligibility to receive federal financial aid funds.

A meeting in November 2007 found that the school was losing $80,000 each month, and was contemplating pay cuts for faculty, layoffs, and even bankruptcy protection. The same month, the school stopped paying its faculty. The school, which was set to begin its spring 2008 trimester on January 8, effectively shuttered, and classes were not held. Law School faculty continued teaching through the spring semester after being promised that pay would be forthcoming at the start of the semester. The DOE, citing the college's poor record keeping and financial issues, withheld financial aid from the school.

The college owes its faculty and staff millions of dollars in back pay. In July 2008, the college acknowledged its debts in agreements it signed to settle wage claim disputes filed with the Department of Industrial Relations. A number of creditors of the college have prevailed in lawsuits.

Accreditation was revoked in February 2008 by WASC for numerous violations, including lack of proper governing structure, failure to keep proper student records, and lack of oversight by the Board.

Students of the New College of California School of Law transferred to John F. Kennedy University Law School in April 2008. The Women’s Spirituality MA program transferred to the Institute of Transpersonal Psychology in Palo Alto in May 2008. The North Bay Campus' Green MBA moved to Dominican University of California in March 2007.

== Notable people ==
=== Alumni ===
- Susie Bright, feminist author
- Dossie Easton, author and psychotherapist
- Ford Greene, attorney
- Marya Hornbacher, author
- Michael Lerner, author and rabbi
- Eric Mar, San Francisco Supervisor (also served as an instructor)
- Gene Ransom, Athlete and coach

=== Faculty ===
- Harry Britt, gay political activist and former Supervisor for San Francisco, California. Britt also directed the Weekend BA Degree Completion Program.
- Daniel Cassidy, author, filmmaker, and founder and codirector of the Irish Studies Program.
- Robert Duncan, founding member of the New College Poetics program.
- Peter Gabel, Ph.D., was a law professor at New College of California's Law School for 30 years, and served as President for 20 years.
- Richard Heinberg, scholar on such topics as Peak Oil and Transition strategies, served as core faculty in the North Bay Campus' BA program in Culture, Ecology, and Sustainable Communities.
- Edie Meidav, novelist, director of the MFA in Writing and Consciousness.
- David Meltzer, poet and musician of the Beat Generation and the San Francisco Renaissance, taught in the Poetics Program.
- A. C. Thompson, winner of the George Polk Award for Local Reporting for his series Forgotten City about San Francisco's public housing, and instructor in the Media Studies Graduate Program.
