= On the Road (George Carlin album) =

Live album by George Carlin
- Released: April 1977
- Recorded: October 3, 1976
- Venue: Dorothy Chandler Pavilion, Los Angeles, California
- Genre: Comedy
- Length: 46:03
- Label: Little David/Atlantic

George Carlin chronology
An Evening with Wally Londo (1975)	On the Road (1977)	Indecent Exposure (1978)

Professional ratings
Review scores
Source	Rating
AllMusic	3/5 stars

On the Road is an album by the American comedian George Carlin, released in 1977. It was recorded on October 3, 1976, at the Dorothy Chandler Pavilion in Los Angeles, California. It peaked at No. 90 on the Billboard 200. The album was included as part of the 1999 The Little David Years (1971-1977) box set.

The original LP included a "libretto" - a word-for-word transcript of the album.

On the Road would be Carlin's last album for three years, due to a heart attack in 1978.

A warning label that says "R: Recommended Adult Listening" appears on the cover of the album.

== Track listing ==
No.	Title	Length
1.	"On the Road"	4:46
2.	"Death and Dying"	13:48
3.	"Head Lines"	4:23
4.	"Kids Are Too Small"	3:11
5.	"Rules, Rules, Rules!"	2:32
6.	"Parents' Clichés and Children's Secret Answers"	3:19
7.	"Words We Leave Behind"	1:55
8.	"How's Your Dog?"	5:06
9.	"Supermarkets"	7:03
