= New College of California School of Law =

Former law school in San Francisco, California

- Parent school: New College of California
- Established: 1973 (closed 2008)
- School type: Private law school
- Location: San Francisco, California, US

New College of California School of Law was a private, non-profit law school in San Francisco, California. It was founded in 1973 as a part of the now defunct New College of California, and deemed itself the oldest public interest law school in the United States. It offered a full-time three-year program and a part-time four-year program. New College of California was investigated for financial aid mismanagement, and financial aid funds were frozen while the investigation took place. While no proof of financial wrongdoing was ever released to the public, the financial aid freeze caused the school to become unable to meet its financial demands. In February 2008, due to the college's inability to meet its payroll, the Western Association of Schools and Colleges withdrew its accreditation of New College of California. As a result, the college folded. As of April 1, 2008, the law students transferred to John F. Kennedy University School of Law (as did several faculty members,) and New College School of Law ceased to exist.

A number of well-known lawyers and activists taught and studied at the school, including Roberta Achtenberg, Stephen Bingham, Angela Davis, Peter Gabel, Randolph Daar, and Tom Hayden.

A documentary film, "Practitioners of Justice," about the history, faculty, and alumni of the New College School of Law was made in 2022.

== See also ==
- List of defunct law schools in the United States
