= An Evening with Wally Londo Featuring Bill Slaszo =

An Evening With Wally Londo Featuring Bill Slaszo

Live album by George Carlin
- Released: October 1975
- Recorded: March 18, 1975, UNLV, Las Vegas, Nevada
- Genre: Comedy
- Length: 47:54
- Label: Little David/Atlantic

George Carlin chronology
Toledo Window Box (1974)	An Evening With Wally Londo Featuring Bill Slaszo (1975)	On the Road (1977)

An Evening With Wally Londo Featuring Bill Slaszo is the seventh album released by George Carlin, released in October 1975. Art Director and album cover designer John Kosh. It was also included as part of the 1999 The Little David Years (1971–1977) box set.

Professional ratings
Review scores
Source	Rating
Allmusic	link

== Track listing ==
No.	Title	Length
1.	"New News"	4:21
2.	"Teenage Masturbation"	4:53
3.	"Mental Hot Foots"	2:54
4.	"High on the Plane"	4:29
5.	"Bodily Functions"	5:44
6.	"Wurds"	1:01
7.	"For Names' Sake"	6:58
8.	"Baseball-Football"	2:03
9.	"Good Sports"	2:30
10.	"Flesh Colored Band-Aids"	2:48
11.	"Religious Lift"	3:31
12.	"Radio Dial"	1:52
13.	"Y'Ever"	2:29
14.	"Unrelated Things"	2:21

== Notes ==
- Carlin mentioned the album's release when he hosted the first episode of Saturday Night Live.
- The "Baseball-Football" bit can be frequently heard at the National Baseball Hall of Fame Museum in Cooperstown, New York.
- In his autobiography, Last Words, Carlin stated that he hated the title of this album due to himself being "put on the bill" with two other people, although he did not explain the background of the two names in the title, or why the names were placed in the title.
- In a 2001 interview with Mark Pitta, the album is brought up and Carlin remarks "I thought that was a very clever name for an album." Discussion then turns to the track "Teenage Masturbation" and no more is said of the title.
