= Toledo Window Box =

Live album by George Carlin
- Released: November 1974
- Recorded: July 20, 1974, Paramount Theater, Oakland, California
- Genre: Comedy
- Length: 44:26
- Label: Little David/Warner Bros.

George Carlin chronology
Occupation: Foole (1973)	Toledo Window Box (1974)	An Evening with Wally Londo (1975)

Toledo Window Box is the sixth album released by comedian George Carlin, and the fourth on the Little David label (distributed by Warner Bros. Records in this one instance; Carlin's other Little David albums were released by Warner Communications' Atlantic Records label). It was recorded on July 20, 1974 at the Paramount Theater in Oakland, California, and released in November of that year. It was also included as part of the 1999 The Little David Years box set.

Toledo Window Box is a type of marijuana that Carlin said that a man once offered him - an antithesis to pot names like "Acapulco Gold" and "Colombian Red". This was Carlin's fourth and final gold album.

The front cover features Carlin wearing a white T-shirt with a planter growing marijuana plants, pointing his thumbs back at it, while the back cover shows Carlin wearing almost the same shirt but with the plants gone, while standing there red-eyed and looking "high". The illustration on the t-shirt was done by Drew Struzan, who went on to become a notable illustrator of album covers and movie posters. The version of the album in The Little David Years boxset includes a slip to put the CD in, which shows a picture of a burning joint.

The album's name refers to a report Carlin read stating that the chief of police of Toledo, Ohio had gone to see a viewing of Reefer Madness and a training session by the FBI. Afterwards he made the statement that "You can grow enough marijuana in an average window box to drive the entire population of Toledo stark, raving mad". Carlin then stated that he wanted one of those Toledo Window Boxes.

Professional ratings
Review scores
Source	Rating
Allmusic	4.5/5 stars
Christgau's Record Guide	C+

== Track listing ==
No.	Title	Length
1.	"Goofy Shit"	3:59
2.	"Toledo Window Box"	4:56
3.	"Nursery Rhymes"	4:15
4.	"Some Werds"	7:57
5.	"Water Sez"	1:05
6.	"The Metric System"	2:09
7.	"God"	6:43
8.	"Gay Lib"	2:06
9.	"Snot, the Original Rubber Cement"	2:54
10.	"Urinals Are 50 Percent Universal"	2:27
11.	"A Few More Farts"	5:55
