= Martin Gabel =

American actor (1911-1986)

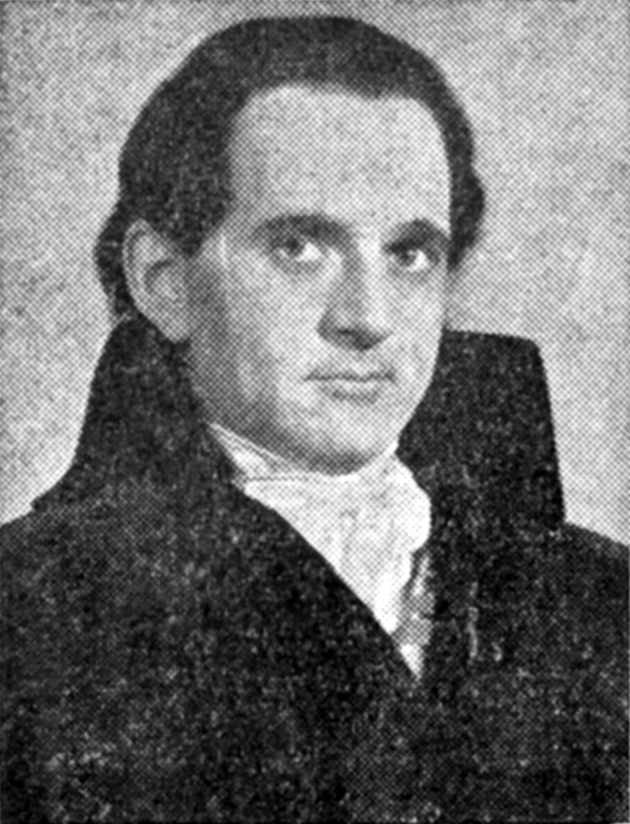
- Martin Gabel as Danton in the Mercury Theatre stage production of Danton's Death (1938)
- Born: June 19, 1911; Philadelphia, Pennsylvania, U.S.
- Died: May 22, 1986 (aged 74); New York City, U.S.
- Occupations: Actor; director; producer
- Years active: 1934–1980
- Spouse: Arlene Francis (m. 1946)
- Children: Peter Gabel
- Relatives: Seth Gabel (great-nephew)

Martin Gabel (June 19, 1911 – May 22, 1986) was an American actor, film director and film producer.

== Early life ==
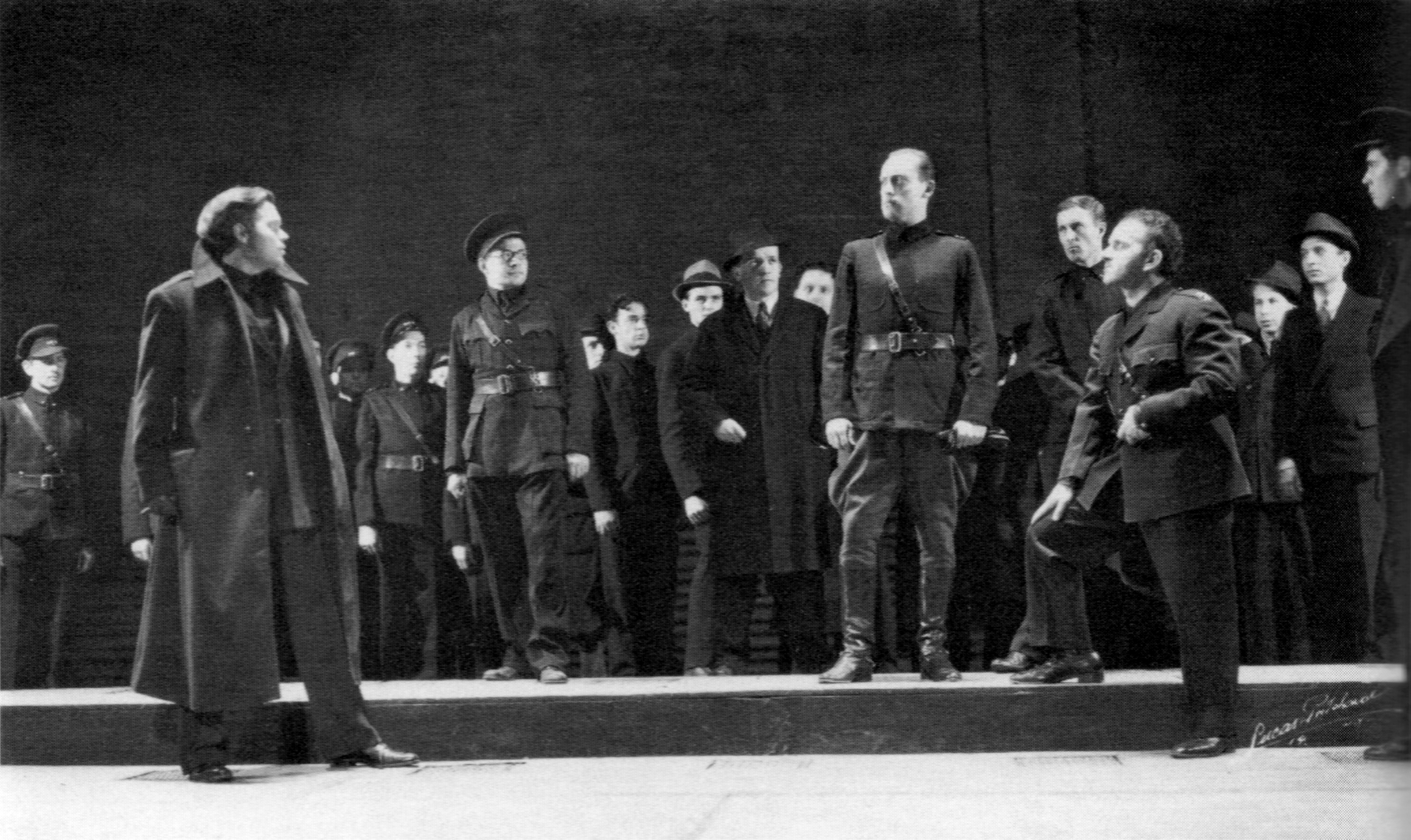
Martin Gabel (fourth from right) played the role of Cassius in the Mercury Theatre production of Caesar (1937)

Gabel was born in Philadelphia, Pennsylvania, to Rebecca and Isaac Gabel, a jeweler, both Jewish immigrants.

== Career ==
One of Gabel's earliest noted roles was as Neil Williams, a newspaper reporter, on the radio serial comedy Easy Aces in the mid-to-late 1930s. Gabel's most noted work was as narrator and host of the May 8, 1945, CBS Radio broadcast of Norman Corwin's epic dramatic poem On a Note of Triumph, a commemoration of the fall of the Nazi regime in Germany and the end of World War II in Europe. The broadcast was so popular that the CBS, NBC, Blue and Mutual networks broadcast a second live production of the program on May 13. The Columbia Masterworks record label subsequently published an album of the May 13 production. The production became the title focus of the Academy Award-winning short film A Note of Triumph: The Golden Age of Norman Corwin in 2005, the 60th anniversary year of the broadcast.

Gabel was first associated with Orson Welles when he played Javert in his six-part radio adaptation of Les Misérables (1937). He became one of the original members of Welles's Mercury Theatre repertory company. On the stage Gabel portrayed Cassius in Caesar (1937), a critically acclaimed modern-dress adaptation of Shakespeare's tragedy streamlined into an anti-fascist tour de force, and starred as Danton in Danton's Death (1938). On radio, he played Professor Van Helsing in "Dracula" (1938), the debut episode of The Mercury Theatre on the Air.

In 1947, he directed his only film, The Lost Moment. Gabel appeared in few films over his career, usually in small roles. A notable large supporting part was as crime boss Tomas Rienzi in Richard Brooks's Deadline U.S.A. (1952), starring Humphrey Bogart. He played a Russian spy in the dialogue free 'The Thief' (1952) alongside Ray Milland, but in a studio error he was billed as 'Martin Gable'. Gabel played another mob figure in a Frank Sinatra private-detective film, Lady in Cement (1968), then co-starred again with Sinatra in Contract on Cherry Street and The First Deadly Sin.

Gabel won the 1961 Tony Award for Best Performance by a Featured Actor for the comedy Big Fish, Little Fish; he was also noted for his performances in the Broadway productions of Baker Street, in which he played Professor Moriarty; and The Rivalry, in which he played Stephen A. Douglas.

He portrayed Hercule Poirot in an unsold TV pilot, which later aired as an episode of General Electric Theater. He played businessman Mr. Strutt in Alfred Hitchcock's Marnie (1964), and the psychiatrist in the Billy Wilder version of The Front Page (1974) with Walter Matthau and Jack Lemmon. He was a frequent guest panelist on the CBS Television Sunday night game show What's My Line?, on which his wife, Arlene Francis, was a regular panelist.

== Personal life ==
Gabel married Arlene Francis in a private wedding at the private chambers of Judge Alexander MacLeod in his courthouse in Paterson, New Jersey, on the morning of May 14, 1946. The pair were joined by Louis Calhern and James M. Cannon. They had a son named Peter, who was an editor for Tikkun Magazine.

== Death ==
Gabel suffered from cancer and by May 1986 had been paralyzed. On May 22, 1986, Gabel suffered a heart attack at his Park Avenue apartment in Manhattan. He was brought to New York Hospital–Cornell Medical Center, where he was pronounced dead at the age of 74. Francis was beside him when he died.

== Selected theatre credits ==
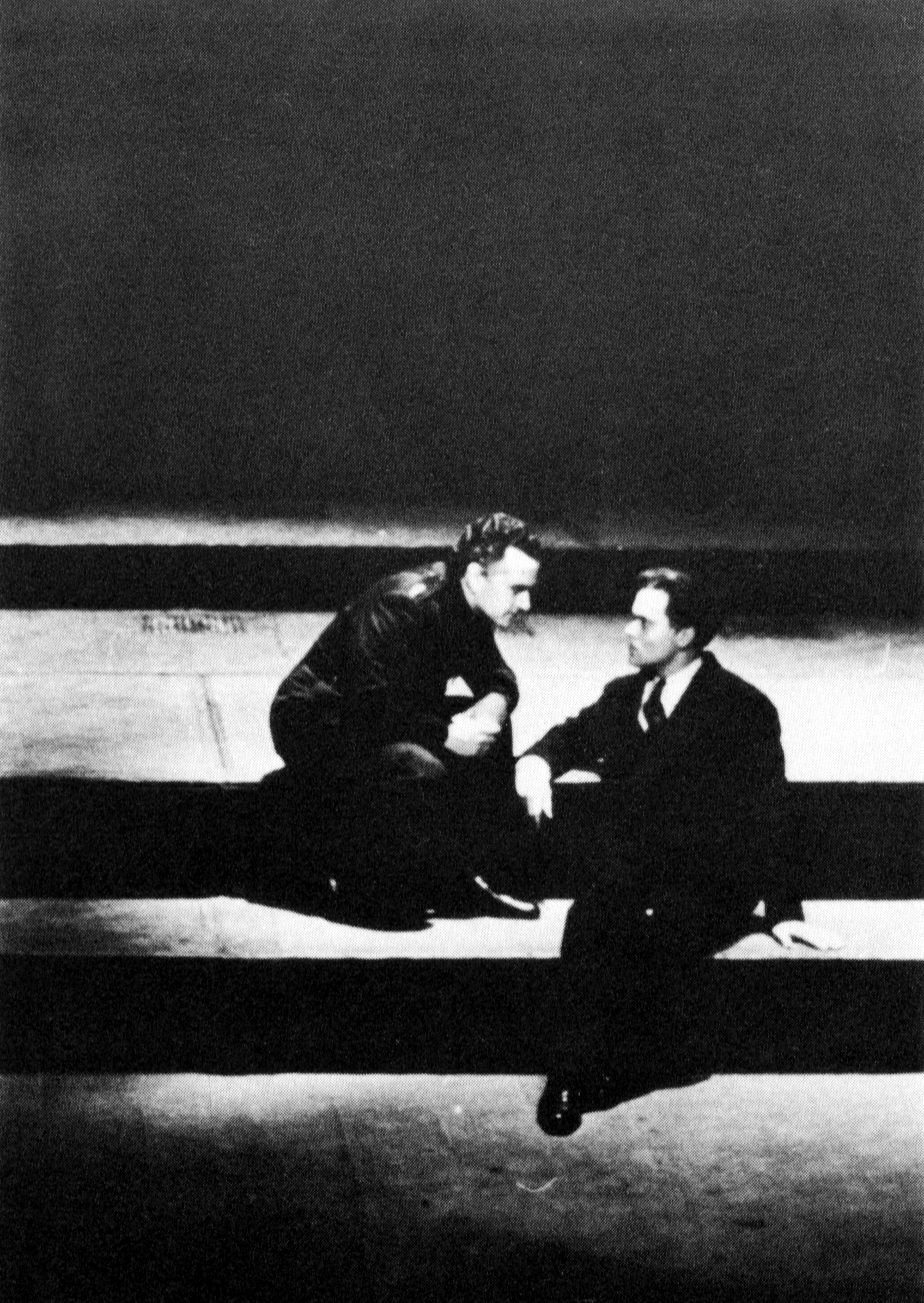
Martin Gabel and Orson Welles in Caesar (1937)

- Caesar (1937–1938) as Cassius
- Danton's Death (1938) as Danton
- Medicine Show (1940) as Statistician; also producer
- Will Success Spoil Rock Hunter? (1955–1956) as Irving LaSalle
- Once More, With Feeling (1958–1959) (producer)
- Big Fish, Little Fish (1961) as Basil Smythe
- Baker Street (1965) as Professor Moriarty
- Sheep on the Runway (1970) as Joseph Mayflower
- In Praise of Love (1973–1975) as Mark Walters

== Filmography ==
Film
Year	Title	Role	Notes
1947	The Lost Moment		Director
1947	Smash-Up, the Story of a Woman		Associate producer
1951	Pictura: An Adventure in Art	Co-Narrator	Voice
1951	M	Charlie Marshall, crime boss	
1951	Fourteen Hours	Dr. Strauss	
1952	Deadline – U.S.A.	Tomas Rienzi	
1952	The Thief	Mr. Bleek	
1957	The James Dean Story	Narrator	
1957	Tip on a Dead Jockey	Bert Smith	
1961	The Crimebusters	George Vincent	
1961	The Power and the Glory	Chief of police	
1963	The Making of the President 1960	Narrator	
1964	Marnie	Sidney Strutt	
1964	Goodbye Charlie	Morton Craft	
1966	Lord Love a Duck	T. Harrison Belmont	Uncredited
1967	Divorce American Style	Dr. Zenwinn	
1968	Lady in Cement	Al Munger	
1970	There Was a Crooked Man...	Warden LeGoff	
1974	The Front Page	Dr. Max J. Eggelhofer	
1980	The First Deadly Sin	Christopher Langley	(final film role)
Television
Year	Title	Role	Notes
1956–1967	What's My Line?	Frequent guest panelist	114 episodes
1960	Thriller	Mr Freitag	1 episode
1960	Have Gun – Will Travel	Nathan Shotness	1 episode
1960	General Electric Theater	Hercule Poirot	1 episode
1967	Tarzan	Peter Maas	1 episode
1972	Harvey	Judge Omar Gaffney	TV movie
1974	Smile, Jenny, You're Dead	Meade De Ruyter	TV movie
1975	What’s My Line?	Mystery Guest	
1977	Contract on Cherry Street	Baruch 'Bob' Waldman, Crime Boss	TV movie
