= Arlene Francis =

American actress and TV host (1907–2001)

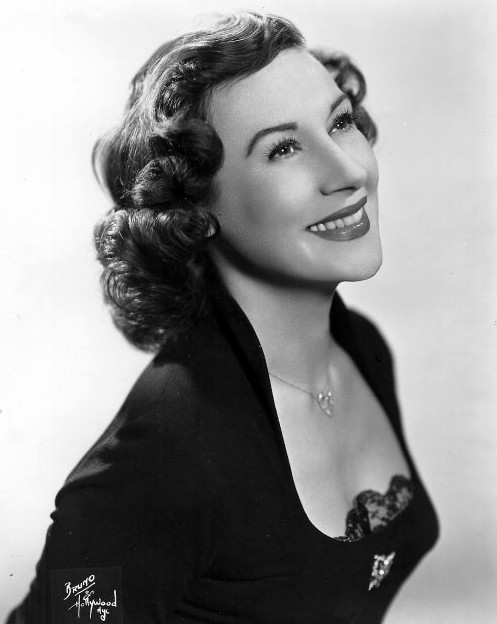
- Francis c.1950
- Born: Arline Frances Kazanjian; October 20, 1907; Boston, Massachusetts, U.S.
- Died: May 31, 2001 (aged 93); San Francisco, California, U.S.
- Resting place: Roosevelt Memorial Park, Trevose, Pennsylvania, U.S.
- Education: Finch College
- Occupations: Actress; radio presenter; television personality
- Years active: 1928–1991
- Spouses: Neil Agnew (m. 1935; div. 1945) Martin Gabel (m. 1946; died 1986)
- Children: Peter Gabel
- Relatives: Seth Gabel (great-nephew)

Arlene Francis (born Arline Frances Kazanjian; October 20, 1907 – May 31, 2001) was an American game show panelist, actress, and radio and television talk show host. She was a pioneer for women in television, and is best known for her long-running role as a panelist on the television game show What's My Line?, on which she appeared regularly from 1950 to 1975.

== Early life ==
Francis was born on October 20, 1907, in Boston, Massachusetts, the daughter of Leah (née Davis) and Aram Kazanjian. Her father, an Armenian, was studying art in Paris at the age of 16 when he learned that both his parents had died in one of the massacres perpetrated by the Ottoman government in Turkey between 1894 and 1896, known as the Hamidian massacres. He immigrated to the United States and became a portrait photographer, opening his own studio in Boston in the early 20th century. Later in life, Kazanjian painted canvases of dogwoods, "rabbits in flight", and other nature scenes, selling them at auction in New York.

When Francis was seven years old, her father decided that opportunities were greater in New York and moved the family to a flat in Washington Heights, Manhattan. She remained a New York resident until she entered a San Francisco nursing home in 1993.

== Career ==
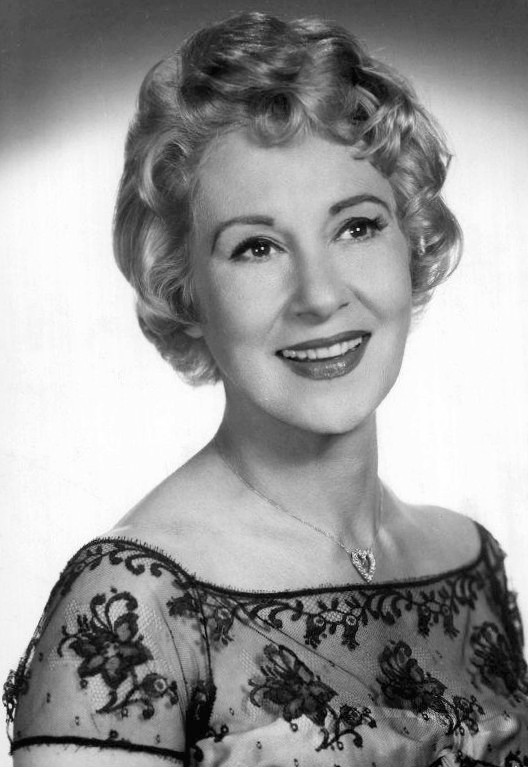
Francis 1958

After attending Finch College, Francis began a varied career as an entertainer based in New York City. She became an accomplished stage actress, performing in many local theatre and off-Broadway plays and in 25 Broadway plays through 1975. In 1932, she made her film debut in Universal's Murders in the Rue Morgue. She appeared in films sporadically until the 1970s.

Francis became a well-known New York City radio personality, hosting several programs. In 1938 she became the female host of the radio game show What's My Name?. Although several men appeared as co-hosts over the years, Francis was the sole female host throughout the program's long run (on ABC, NBC, and Mutual networks) until it ended in 1949.

In 1940, Francis played Betty in Betty and Bob, an early radio soap opera broadcast.

In 1943, she began as host of a network radio game show, Blind Date, which she hosted also on ABC and NBC television from 1949 to 1952. From 1952 to 1961 she was a regular substitute for Dave Garroway on the Today Show. She was a regular contributor to NBC Radio's Monitor in the 1950s and 1960s and hosted a long-running midday chat show on WOR-AM that ran from 1960 to 1984.

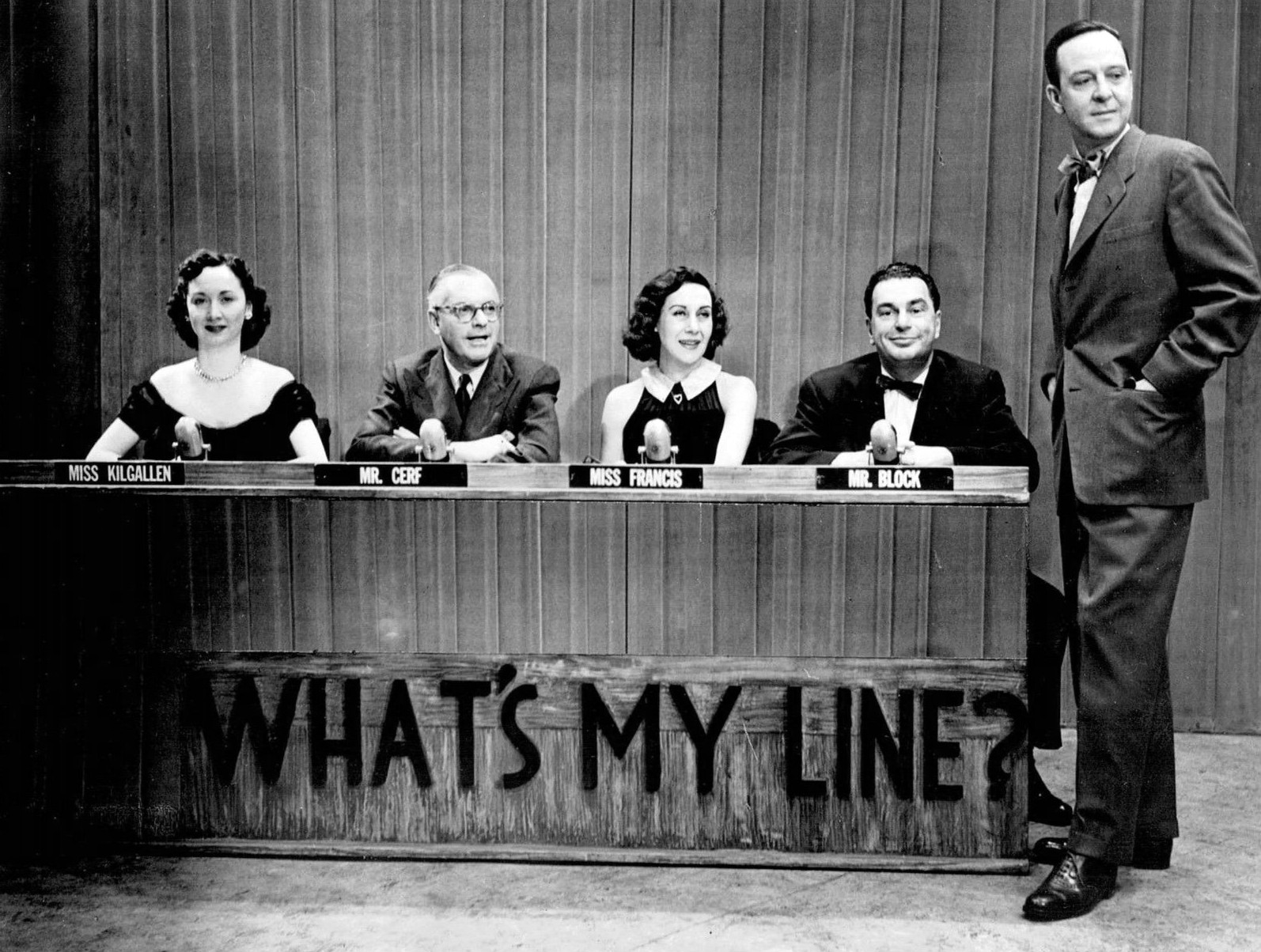
The What's My Line? panel in 1952. From left: Dorothy Kilgallen, Bennett Cerf, Francis, and Hal Block; newscaster John Daly was host of the show.

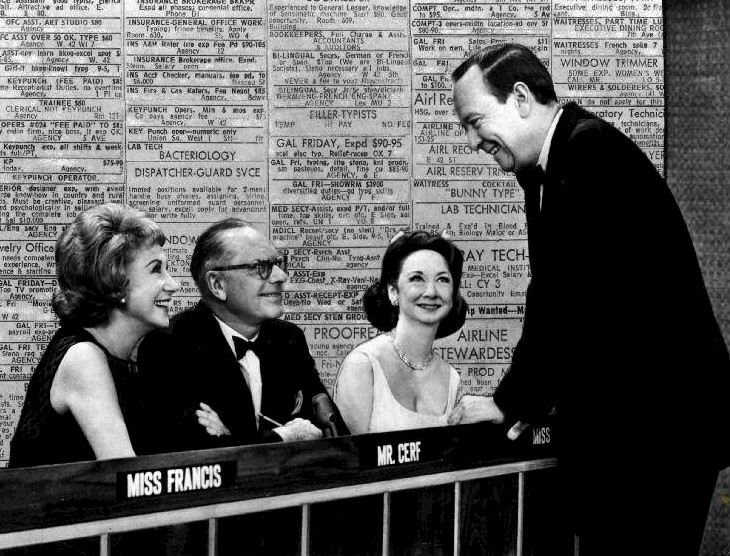
Francis (left) with Cerf, Kilgallen, and Daly on What's My Line? in 1965

Francis was a panelist on the weekly game show What's My Line? from its second episode on CBS in 1950 until its network cancellation in 1967, and in its daily syndicated version from 1968 to 1975.

The original show, which featured guests whose occupation, or "line," the panelists were to guess, became one of the classic television game shows, noted for the urbanity of its host and panelists.

She appeared on other game shows, including Match Game, Password, To Tell the Truth, and other programs produced by Mark Goodson and Bill Todman, including a short-lived hosting stint on the Goodson-Todman show By Popular Demand, replacing original host Robert Alda.

According to TV Guide, Francis was the highest-earning game show panelist in the 1950s, making $1,000 (equivalent to $9,200 in 2024) per show on the prime time version of What's My Line?. By contrast, the second-highest-paid panelists on TV, Dorothy Kilgallen and Faye Emerson, received $500 (equivalent to $4,600 in 2024) per appearance.

Francis was the emcee on the last episodes of The Comeback Story, a short-lived 1954 reality show on ABC in which mostly celebrities shared stories of having overcome adversity in their personal lives.

Francis was a pioneer for women on television, one of the first to host a program that was not musical or dramatic in nature. From 1954 to 1957, she was host and editor-in-chief of Home, NBC's hour-long daytime magazine program oriented toward women, which was conceived by network president Pat Weaver to complement the network's Today and Tonight programs. In 1954, she appeared on the cover of Newsweek magazine. She hosted Talent Patrol in the mid-1950s. In 1962, Francis was one of numerous people recruited to guest host Tonight during an interval period before Johnny Carson took over as host from Jack Paar. This made her the first woman to host not only Tonight but a national late-night U.S. network talk show. In November 1961, she hosted The Price is Right for Bill Cullen while he was on vacation.

She acted in a few Hollywood films, debuting in the role of a streetwalker who falls prey to mad scientist Bela Lugosi in Murders in the Rue Morgue (1932). In her memoir, Francis said she was cast for the movie even though her only acting experience at the time was in a small Shakespearean production in a convent school she had attended. Some sixteen years later, she appeared in the film version of Arthur Miller's play All My Sons (1948) with Edward G. Robinson.

In the 1960s, Francis made three films: One, Two, Three (1961), directed by Billy Wilder and filmed in Munich, in which she played James Cagney's wife; The Thrill of It All (1963) with Doris Day and James Garner; and, in 1968, the television version of the play Laura, which she had played on stage several times. Her final film performance was in Wilder's Fedora (1978). Also in the 1960s, Francis appeared for three summers at the historic Elitch Theatre in Denver, Colorado.

In 1978, Francis wrote her autobiography, Arlene Francis: A Memoir, with longtime friend Florence Rome. In 1960, she wrote That Certain Something: The Magic of Charm, and she published a cookbook, No Time for Cooking, in 1961. She was a member of the Peabody Awards Board of Jurors from 1980 to 1982. Francis also guested on television programs including Mrs. G. Goes to College in 1962 in the episode "The Mother Affair".

Francis made sporadic television appearances throughout the 1980s, with her final appearances being during Mark Goodson's birthday party and on The Howard Stern Show with Robin Quivers and Kitty Carlisle, in 1991.

== Personal life ==
Francis was married twice. Her first marriage, from 1935 to 1945, was to Neil Agnew, an executive with Paramount Pictures; they divorced in 1945.

She wrote of this experience in her 1978 autobiography:

Having made the actual physical break, it was easier for me than I had thought to explain to Neil some of what I felt, what I had been feeling for so long a time. Not all, of course. There were areas which I couldn't discuss even then, which would be too hurtful to him, I felt. I saw him fairly often, and he courted me as though we had just met, but I was building up strengths which enabled me to resist not only his blandishments (including a lovely little house which he bought in New York as an enticement to get me to change my mind) but those of my parents, who also would have given anything to see me go back to the status which had been quo.

As she disclosed in her autobiography, she admitted she never should have married Neil Agnew because she was not in love with him. During the marriage, she met producer and actor Martin Gabel and fell in love with him. He encouraged her to divorce Agnew, which was one of the sources of her torment because her parents loved Agnew like a son. After Francis divorced him to marry Gabel, they initially did not like Gabel for several reasons, including her divorce.

Francis's marriage to Gabel lasted from 1946 until his death in 1986. Gabel was a frequent guest panelist on What's My Line?. The couple, who often exchanged endearments on the show, had a son, Peter Gabel, born January 28, 1947, a legal scholar associated with New College of California in San Francisco. Peter Gabel was an associate editor of Tikkun, a Jewish-community commentary magazine. While working as a tour guide at the 1964 New York World's Fair, Peter surprised his mother as a contestant on What's My Line?.

In 1962, Francis and her husband paid $185,000 to settle a lawsuit stemming from an incident in which a dumbbell, which the family maid had used to prop open a window, became dislodged and killed a pedestrian below.

On May 26, 1963, Francis was involved in a serious car accident while driving alone from a theater on Long Island to the Manhattan studio where she was expected for a live telecast of What's My Line?. The force from a car that struck her car caused her to skid on the wet surface of the Northern State Parkway, jump the highway's concrete divider, and collide with a car containing five passengers, one of whom was killed. Francis suffered a broken collarbone, a concussion and many cuts and bruises.

Francis was known for wearing a heart-shaped diamond pendant, a gift from Gabel, which she wore on nearly all of her What's My Line? appearances. A mugger robbed her of the pendant as she was walking down the street in New York City in 1988.

== Death ==
Francis died at the age of 93 on May 31, 2001, in San Francisco, California, from Alzheimer's disease and cancer.

== Bibliography ==
- Francis, Arlene (1978). Arlene Francis: A Memoir. with Florence Rome. New York: Simon & Schuster. ISBN 978-0-671-22808-8.
