= Gene Ransom =

American basketball player (1957–2022)

Personal information
- Born: January 21, 1957
- Died: February 4, 2022 (aged 65) Oakland, California, U.S.
- Listed height: 5 ft 9 in (1.75 m)

Career information
- High school: Berkeley (Berkeley, California)
- College: California (1975–1978)
- NBA draft: 1979: 9th round, 175th overall pick
- Drafted by: Golden State Warriors
- Position: Point guard

Career highlights
- Second-team All-Pac-8 (1977)
- Stats at Basketball Reference

Horace Eugene Ransom II (January 21, 1957 – February 4, 2022), was a prominent basketball player for the California Golden Bears from 1975 to 1978. Ransom moved as a young boy from Fresno, California, to Berkeley, where he became a "three-sport legend" at Berkeley High School, excelling in baseball, football, and basketball.

Ransom emulated the basketball style of Berkeley High School basketball stars Phil Chenier, Doug Kagawa, and Carl Shelton. Ransom "shadowed Chenier... trying to pick up on his game."

When Ransom started playing for the Jackets his sophomore year at BHS, he quickly garnered the attention of the local and regional press, filling stadiums with local fans eager to watch the kid play.

“Gene is the only person that I know that they could sell out the Oakland Coliseum for a high school basketball game,” said Harris, a filmmaker who has captured Ransom’s accomplishments, along with those of many other athletes, on camera. Sports journalists started calling the rising Berkeley star a nickname that followed him throughout his career: Gene “the Dream” Ransom.

Ransom averaged 14.8 points per game in his college career at the University of California, Berkeley, and led Cal's Golden Bears in assists all three years that he played. In one game for Cal, Ransom was on the court for all but the final 90 seconds of a five-overtime game against Oregon, ultimately won by the Bears. Ransom played 63 1/2 minutes, which as of 2001 remained the Pac-10 record for most minutes played in a game.

Ransom was inducted into the California Athletics Hall of Fame in 2001.

== Later life ==
After his time as a player, Ransom later served as a basketball coach at Berkeley High School, leading the freshman boys team to a 27–0 record, and served as a youth mentor in other ways. He worked with the nonprofit Athletes United for Peace, which provided healthy alternatives for youth caught up in street violence. With his stepson Jonathon Smith, Ransom also started Dynasty Basketball, an Amateur Athletic Union summer team for promising high school players. As described in the Berkeley Daily Planet in 2002,

Ransom coached the freshman team at Berkeley High during the 2000-01 season, but decided to step away after his proposals for study programs and community service for the players fell on deaf ears. With the budget getting tighter every year at BHS, the support system for younger players can be lacking. In fact, with the newest set of budget cuts, the freshman team has been eliminated for the upcoming school year. So when Davis asked Ransom to help organize a team for him and his friends, Ransom jumped at the chance. While taking classes at the New College of California in San Francisco, he had written a proposal for a comprehensive program for high school athletes, complete with study sessions and community service as equal components with practice and games. Dynasty Basketball is the beginning stages of that vision.

Ransom explained that

They asked me (to coach) because they knew I'm a coach that's concerned with them as true student-athletes... My kids didn't feel as if they were getting enough from their high schools. They know I'm about them, not about myself.... These kids were overlooked, and now they're getting a chance to show how good they are.

Following the occupation of his father, Ramsom also worked as a longshoreman. Having not completed his degree at the University of California, Berkeley, Ransom eventually completed his undergraduate coursework and obtained a college degree from New College of California.

== Death ==
On Friday, February 4, 2022, at about 5:08pm, Ransom was killed in a freeway shooting in Oakland, California. The killing appeared to be a murder motivated by road rage. The freeway was shut down for several hours. A 25-year-old man was arrested the next day, and was later charged with murder.
