= Occupation: Foole =

Live album by George Carlin
- Released: October 1973
- Recorded: March 2–3, 1973, Circle Star Theater, San Carlos, California
- Genre: Comedy
- Length: 48:03
- Label: Little David/Atlantic

George Carlin chronology
Class Clown (1972)	Occupation: Foole (1973)	Toledo Window Box (1974)

Professional ratings
Review scores
Source	Rating
Allmusic	3.5/5 stars

Occupation: Foole is the fifth album released by American comedian George Carlin. It was recorded on March 2 and 3, 1973 at the Circle Star Theater in San Carlos, California, and released in October of that year. The album was later included as part of the 1992 Classic Gold collection, and The Little David Years (1971-1977) box set in 1999.

Much of Occupation: Foole is devoted to Carlin's observations about growing up on the Upper West Side of New York City in the 1950s, covering everything from gang culture to school life. The final track, "Filthy Words", is a continuation and expansion of "Seven Words You Can Never Say on Television" from his previous album, Class Clown.

== Background and legacy ==
When asked in the January 1982 issue of Playboy if any of his albums had been done during a heavy cocaine period, Carlin said, "The Class Clown album was done totally sober. I'd realized what a hell I'd made for myself and I cleaned up completely for three months. You can hear the clarity of my thinking and of my speech on that album. But by the next one, Occupation: Foole, I was right back into the trip again. I'm more frantic, more breathless. You can hear how sick I am. If you want to see a cokehead, just look at the pictures on the Occupation: Foole album. The angles of my body show you an awful lot. I started doing coke to feel open but by that time the hole had opened so wide that I'd fallen through. The body language in those photos tells you everything."

During the performance of his "Filthy Words" routine Carlin was handed a piece of paper by a stage hand, and after reading the paper announced that he had just won the 1973 Grammy Award for Best Comedy Recording for his FM & AM release. The Grammy Awards were being broadcast at the same time he was on stage, and he had not attended because he was contracted to perform the concert which became Occupation Foole on the same night.

The "Filthy Words" routine also became the subject of a complaint made to the United States Federal Communications Commission after it was broadcast uncensored on New York City radio station WBAI on October 30, 1973. Following the lodging of a complaint, the FCC proceeded to ask Pacifica, the owners of WBAI, for a response, then issued a declaratory order upholding the complaint. No specific sanctions were included in the order but WBAI was put on notice that "in the event subsequent complaints are received, the Commission will then decide whether it should utilize any of the available sanctions it has been granted by Congress." Pacifica appealed this decision, which ultimately made its way to the Supreme Court of the United States. In Federal Communications Commission v. Pacifica Foundation, the Court declared that the FCC has the authority to prohibit broadcasts containing indecent language during hours in which children could be listening.

== Track listing ==
=== Side one ===
1. "Welcome to My Job" - 3:02
2. "Occupation: Foole" - 3:41
3. "White Harlem" - 4:45
4. "The Hallway Groups" - 2:07
5. "Black Consciousness" - 2:38
6. "New York Voices" - 7:06

=== Side two ===
1. "Grass Swept the Neighborhood" - 1:25
2. "Childhood Cliches" - 4:04
3. "Cute Little Farts" - 5:10
4. "Raisin Rhetoric" - 2:06
5. "Filthy Words" - 11:30
