= Luther Burbank Center for the Arts =

Performing arts venue in Santa Rosa, California

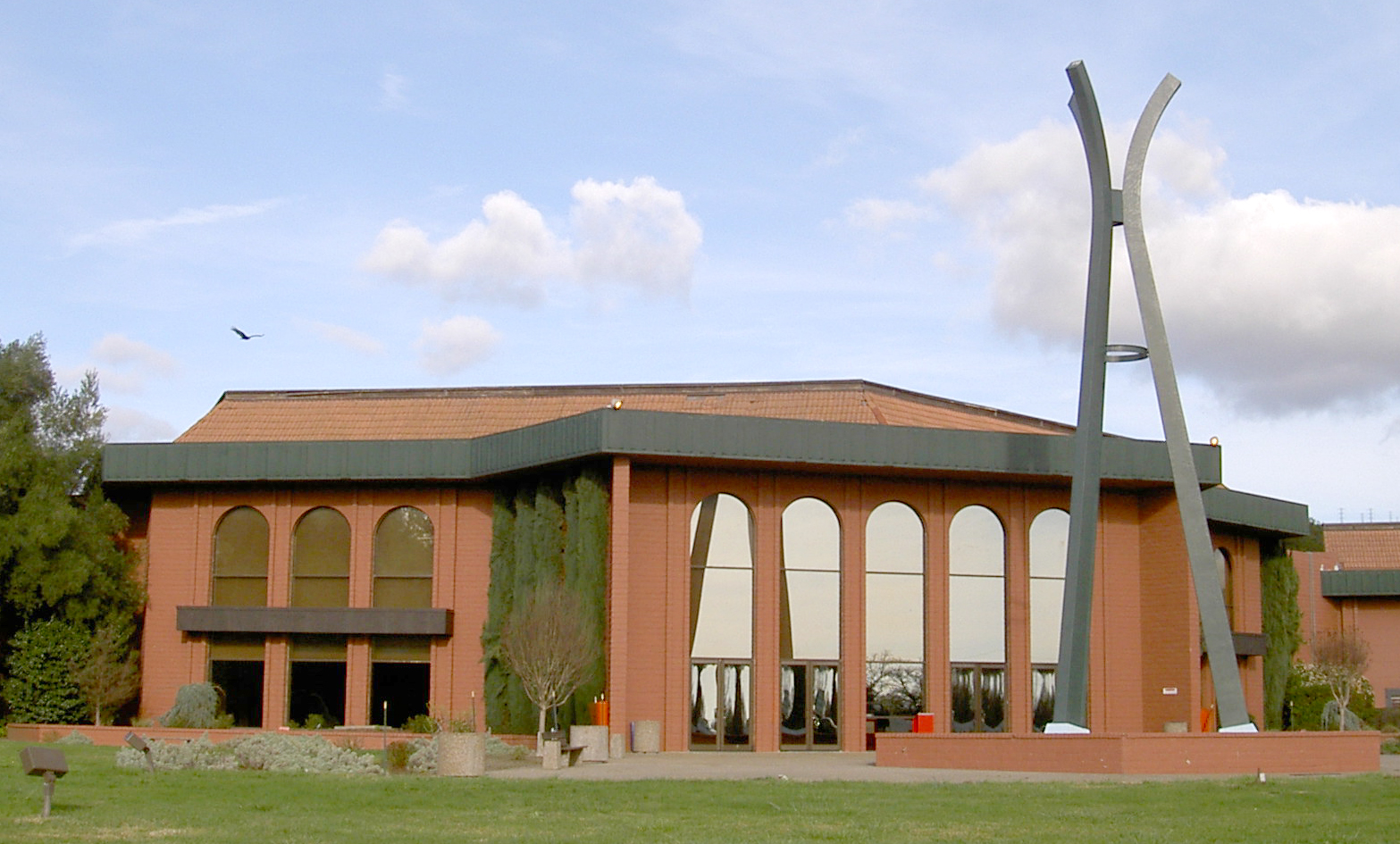
- The center in 2009
- Interactive map of Luther Burbank Center for the Arts
- Former names: Wells Fargo Center for the Arts (2005–2016)
- Address: 50 Mark West Springs Rd; Santa Rosa, CA 95403
- Coordinates: 38.4932°N 122.7492°W
- Owner: Luther Burbank Memorial Foundation
- Capacity: 1,612 (Ruth Finley Person Theater); 399 (East Auditorium)
- Type: Performing arts center

Construction
- Opened: 1981
- Cost: $4.5 million

Website
- http://lutherburbankcenter.org/

The Luther Burbank Center for the Arts (sometimes called the LBC), and previously known as the Wells Fargo Center for the Arts from March 2005 to March 2016) is a performance venue located just north of Santa Rosa, California, near U.S. 101. The facility is owned and operated by the Luther Burbank Memorial Foundation, a non-profit arts organization established in 1979.

== Facilities ==
The principal performance space is the Ruth Finley Person Theater, which seats 1,612 around a 58-foot (18 m) wide stage, with no seat further than 75 feet (23 m) from the stage. In addition to performing arts, the Center offers facilities for parties and community events.

The Center's smaller venues include:

- Carston Cabaret (capacity: 100–300 people)
- East Auditorium (capacity: 400) formerly known as The Merlo Theater
- Fireside Room, with gas-powered fireplace
- Pavilion (outdoor location)
- Lytton Rancheria Grand Lobby
- Atrium
- A 9,000-square-foot (840 m^{2}) atrium
- three conference rooms

== Presentations and tenants ==
The Center presents more than 100 performances each year. Many notable artists have performed at the Center. Resident companies include the North Bay Stage Company and Roustabout Theater.

Other tenants include the Santa Rosa Original Certified Farmers Market and various medical and educational organizations like Anova Center for Education.

== History ==
The Foundation purchased the property from the Christian Life Center in the 1970s for $4.5 million. The facility opened to the public in 1981. Henry Trione, a philanthropist affiliated with Wells Fargo bank, assembled a group of donors, dubbed "Henry's Angels", who purchased the property for $4.5 million cash in a bankruptcy court in 1981. In 2006, the Foundation sold the naming rights to Wells Fargo Bank for ten years, coming into effect on March 12, 2005. The foundation continued to own and operate the center, which reverted to its original name on March 12, 2016. The center's east wing was heavily damaged in the Tubbs fire.

=== Notable performances ===
The venue was the site of the taping of comedian Lewis Black's fourth album, Luther Burbank Performing Arts Center Blues, and the final recorded performance by legendary comedian George Carlin, his 14th HBO special, It's Bad for Ya.

== See also ==
- List of concert halls
- Luther Burbank
