= Kenny Rankin =

American singer and songwriter (1940–2009)

- Rankin performing at The Bottom Line club in Greenwich Village in New York City in 1976, photographer Richard E. Aaron

Background information
- Born: February 10, 1940; Manhattan, New York City, U.S.
- Died: June 7, 2009 (aged 69) Los Angeles, California, U.S.
- Genres: Jazz, pop, rock, folk
- Occupations: Musician, songwriter
- Instruments: Vocals, guitar, piano
- Years active: 1967–2009
- Labels: Mercury, Little David, Atlantic, Cypress, Private Music, Chesky, Verve

Kenneth Joseph Rankin (February 10, 1940 – June 7, 2009) was an American singer and songwriter in the folk rock and singer-songwriter genres; he was influenced by jazz. Rankin often sang notes which were in a high range to express emotion.

== Biography ==
Rankin was born in Manhattan, New York City. He was introduced to music by his mother, who sang at home and for friends. Early in his career he worked as a singer-songwriter.

Three of Rankin's albums entered the Billboard magazine Album Chart. Most of his career was in pop music. He was a guitarist on the album Bringing It All Back Home by Bob Dylan. He appeared on The Tonight Show more than twenty times. Late night TV host Johnny Carson wrote the liner notes to Rankin's 1967 debut album, Mind Dusters, which included the single "Peaceful." Georgie Fame had had a UK hit with the song in 1969. This was Rankin's only songwriting credit which made the British charts; it reached No. 16 and was on the chart for nine weeks. He re-recorded the song for his album Like a Seed (1972). Helen Reddy covered "Peaceful" in 1973; it reached No. 2 on the US Adult Contemporary chart and No. 12 on the pop charts in both the US and Canada.

When Rankin worked with Alan Broadbent, Mike Wofford, and Bill Watrous, his music became more like jazz. His songs were performed by Peggy Lee, Mel Tormé, and Carmen McRae. Stan Getz said his voice was like "a horn with a heartbeat". Reflecting his interest in Brazilian music Rankin recorded the album Here in My Heart in Rio de Janeiro with jazz musicians Michael Brecker and Ernie Watts. Rankin returned to performing and recording more contemporary songs after signing with Verve Records, including "A Song for You" by Leon Russell and "I've Just Seen a Face" by the Beatles. After recording the Beatles' song "Blackbird" for his album Silver Morning, he was asked by Paul McCartney to perform it when McCartney and John Lennon were inducted into the Songwriters Hall of Fame.

Rankin befriended comedian George Carlin; both were signed to Little David Records. Beginning in 1972 Rankin was often the opening act or musical guest for Carlin's live performances. The two flew in Carlin's private jet and toured together intermittently for nearly ten years. Although Rankin had overcome his drug habit at Phoenix House, he returned to using cocaine while on tour with Carlin. Rankin sang at Carlin's memorial service in June 2008.

== Personal life and death ==
He was married to Yvonne Rodriguez-Calderone. He died of lung cancer on June 7, 2009, three weeks after he was diagnosed with the illness.

== Selected discography ==
=== Albums ===
- Mind-Dusters (Mercury, 1967)
- Family (Mercury, 1969)
- Like a Seed (Little David, 1972)
- Silver Morning (Little David, 1974)
- Inside (Little David, 1975)
- The Kenny Rankin Album (Little David, 1977)
- After the Roses (Atlantic, 1980)
- Hiding in Myself (Cypress, 1988)
- Because of You (Chesky, 1991)
- Professional Dreamer (Private Music, 1995)
- Here in My Heart (Private Music, 1997)
- The Bottom Line Encore Collection (The Bottom Line, 1999)
- A Christmas Album (Rankin Music, 1999)
- Haven't We Met? (Image Entertainment, 2001)
- A Song for You (Verve, 2002)

=== As guest ===
With Benny Carter

- Benny Carter Songbook (MusicMasters, 1996)
- Benny Carter Songbook Volume II (MusicMasters, 1997)

Art Garfunkel's album Lefty, duet on "I Wonder Why" 1988

Michael Franks' album Passion Fruit, background vocals on "Sunday Morning Here With You" 1983
