= Peter Gabel =

American legal scholar (1947–2022)

- Born: January 28, 1947
- Died: October 25, 2022 (aged 75)
- Education: Deerfield Academy; Harvard University (B.A.)(J.D.); The Wright Institute (Ph.D.)
- Years active: 1964-2022
- Children: 1
- Parents: Martin Gabel; Arlene Francis
- Relatives: Seth Gabel (first cousin once removed)

Peter Gabel (January 28, 1947 – October 25, 2022) was an American law academic and associate editor of Tikkun, a bi-monthly Jewish critique of politics, culture, and society. He wrote a number of articles for the magazine on subjects ranging from the original intent of the framers of the Constitution ("Founding Father Knows Best") to the creationism/evolution controversy ("Creationism and the Spirit of Nature").

Gabel was a founder of both the Institute for Labor and Mental Health in Oakland, California, and the Critical Legal Studies movement. He published more than a dozen articles in law journals such as the Harvard Law Review and Texas Law Review, focusing on the role of law in shaping popular consciousness and on how law can best be used to bring about progressive social change.

== Biography ==
=== Early life and education ===
Gabel was the only child of actress, radio and television talk show host, and television game show personality Arlene Francis and actor and director Martin Gabel. His father was Jewish while his mother was of Armenian, English and German descent.

He graduated from Deerfield Academy, received his B.A. (1968) and J.D. (1972) from Harvard University, where he served as editor for The Harvard Lampoon, and received his Ph.D. from the Wright Institute in 1981.

As a teenager he worked as a guide for the 1964 New York World's Fair, a fact he revealed on the game show What's My Line?, where he appeared as a guest and stumped the panel, which included his mother. He appeared a second time in 1967 along with Jonathan Cerf as the editors of The Harvard Lampoon, once again stumping the panel which included both his mother and father, plus Cerf's father, Bennett Cerf, although Bennett disqualified himself at the beginning of the segment because he revealed later that he'd been tipped off the two would appear on the show. Gabel appeared again in a 1973 syndicated episode but was guessed by Soupy Sales.

=== Career ===
Gabel taught law at the University of California, Berkeley and at the University of Minnesota before becoming a law professor for 30 years at the New College of California School of Law. He also served as New College's president for 20 years. The college, founded in 1971, was an alternative school in the Mission District that offered undergraduate degrees as well as graduate degrees in psychology and law before its accreditation was revoked and the school was forced to close in June 2008.

Gabel was active in the Project for Integrating Spirituality, Law, and Politics, a group in the San Francisco Bay Area that: "will bring together law teachers, lawyers, and law students in the Bay Area who share our group's aspiration to connect the inner and the outer in a fundamental transformation of legal culture." He was also strongly focused on communalizing the neighborhood in Noe Valley, San Francisco. One of the group's successful actions was to save a small independent bookstore, Cover to Cover, which was hurt by a publishing slump. Gabel created a group email for neighbors who wanted to help and distributed fliers in the neighborhood, asking neighbors to sign a list pledging to buy a hardback book every month.

=== Social activism ===
From 1968 on, Gabel was an outspoken supporter of multiple social causes including women's rights, LGBTQ+ rights and the environmental movement.

In 2015, when receiving his honorary doctorate, he commented how "in 1968 there was a radiant spirit of idealism in the air that drew me into the great social movements of that time—the civil rights movement, the anti-Vietnam war movement, the women’s movement, the environmental movement, the gay and lesbian movement, all movements that sought to transform the world in a more loving and just direction."

=== Personal life and death ===
Gabel had a son, Samuel, with his long-time partner, Unite Here union organizer Lisa Jaicks.

Gabel was the bassist in The Central Park Zoo, a dance band.

Gabel died of amyloidosis on October 25, 2022, at the age of 75.

== Published works ==
- The Desire for Mutual Recognition: Social Movements and the Dissolution of the False Self (Routledge, 2018)
- Another Way of Seeing: Essays on Transforming Law, Politics and Culture (Quid Pro Books, 2013)
- The Political Meaning of Bush v. Gore, 2 N.C.C. J. PUB INTR. L.1 (2001)
- The Bank Teller and Other Essays on the Politics of Meaning (Acada Books/New College of California Press, 2000)
- The Spiritual Truth of JFK (Tikkun magazine, March/April 1992)
- The Phenomenology of Rights-Consciousness and the Pact of the Withdrawn Selves, 62 Tex. L. Rev. 1563 (1984).
- Roll Over Beethoven, 36 Stan. L. Rev. 1 (1984) (with Duncan Kennedy).
- Book Review of Ronald Dworkin, Taking Rights Seriously, 91 Harv. L. Rev. 302 (1977).
