= Class Clown =

Live album by George Carlin
- Released: September 29, 1972
- Recorded: May 27, 1972
- Venue: Santa Monica Civic Auditorium, Santa Monica, California
- Genre: Comedy
- Length: 48:03
- Label: Little David/Atlantic

George Carlin chronology
FM & AM (1972)	Class Clown (1972)	Occupation: Foole (1973)

Class Clown is the fourth album released by American comedian George Carlin. It was recorded on May 27, 1972 at the Santa Monica Civic Auditorium in Santa Monica, California, and released in September.

== Background ==
At the time Carlin was relatively well known for tame satirical routines about the entertainment industry. His previous album FM & AM released the same year, showed that he was already drifting towards counter-culture icon, but Class Clown was a landmark. Besides musings about his youth, the album featured strongly directed remarks against the Vietnam War and his attachment to taboo topics. The album contains "Seven Words You Can Never Say on Television", which became the focus of government harassment in the year that followed, and perhaps Carlin's most famous calling card. Carlin continued to explore the use of profanity for the rest of his career. The album marks the first time Carlin used the word "fuck" in any of his recordings.

In the liner notes, Carlin dedicates the album to Lenny Bruce, "for taking all the risks". He also lists all the nuns and priests that worked at Corpus Christi School which he had attended as a child, and who are spoken of at length through the album. In a 2004 appearance on Inside the Actors Studio (episode 1013), Carlin explained that, "I wanted people to know that the disrespect that I had for the dogmatic aspect, and for the inconsistency, and in a lot of cases the cruelty of Catholic doctrine, was tempered with an affection and a gratitude that I had for this wonderful setting that I considered like a garden, where they let me grow, be a creative person and think for myself there, so I kind of wanted to kind of illustrate that, and go, thanks and no thanks".

== Release and reception ==
Professional ratings
Review scores
Source	Rating
AllMusic	link
Newsday	A−

Reviewing the record in 1973 for Newsday, Robert Christgau found Carlin's humor "organic" and wrote, "Like Bill Cosby, Carlin seems genuinely good-natured—his takeoffs on his old parochial school buddies are affectionate and respectful. This is probably why his political humor tends to go a little flat—he can't muster the sustained hostility it requires."

Class Clown was reissued by Atlantic Records in 2000. It was also included as part of the 1992 Classic Gold collection, and The Little David Years (1971–1977) box set in 1999.

In 2016, the album was selected for preservation in the National Recording Registry due to its "cultural, historic, or artistic significance."

== Chart performance ==
The album debuted on Billboard magazine's Top LP's & Tape chart in the issue dated October 14, 1972, peaking at No. 22 during a thirty-five-week run on the chart.

== Track listing ==
All tracks by George Carlin.

=== Side one ===
1. "Class Clown: (a) Bi-Labial Fricative (b) Attracting Attention (c) Squeamish" - 16:06
2. "Wasted Time - Sharing a Swallow" - 2:27
3. "Values (How Much Is That Dog Crap in the Window?)" - 5:16

=== Side two ===
1. "I Used to Be Irish Catholic" - 2:57
2. "The Confessional" - 4:12
3. "Special Dispensation - Heaven, Hell, Purgatory and Limbo" - 3:41
4. "Heavy Mysteries" - 1:59
5. "Muhammad Ali - America the Beautiful" - 4:35
6. "Seven Words You Can Never Say on Television" - 7:03

== Personnel ==
- Peter Abbott - editing, remixing
- Barry Feinstein - photography, production design

== Charts ==
Chart (1972)	Peak position
US Billboard Top LPs & Tape	22
