= The Little David Years (1971–1977) =

Box set by George Carlin
- Released: October 19, 1999
- Recorded: 1971–1977
- Genre: Comedy
- Label: Atlantic

George Carlin chronology
You Are All Diseased (1999)	The Little David Years (1971–1977) (1999)	Complaints and Grievances (2001)

Professional ratings
Review scores
Source	Rating
Allmusic	5/5 stars

The Little David Years (1971–1977) is a box set by American comedian George Carlin. It consists of his six albums recorded with the Little David record label, with an additional CD of previously unreleased bonus material, including "The Coney Island recordings"; a recording he made as a child. This seven-disc set was released on October 19, 1999, on the Atlantic Records label.

== Production ==
In December 1999, Carlin discussed the box set with Scott Simon of NPR:

Scott Simon: To listen to these CDs is to understand what changed in you, the process that you went through.
George Carlin: Well, that would exclude any further growth. Uh, there has been considerable further growth since 1977.

Simon and Carlin then went on to discuss the final disc in the set: Free Complimentary Extra Bonus Disc Not for Sale Anywhere!

Carlin: There is a twentieth cut that isn't listed. The nineteenth cut is the last one listed. And down in number twenty—and this happened because of a mistake in indexing when we made this box set—these are tapes I made when I was twelve years old in little booths.
Simon: I'm embarrassed to say I didn't listen to it because I thought it was over at nineteen.
Carlin: And you would be right and I don't know how I'm going to explain this to the consumer... administration or whoever they are.
Simon: Well take a second now.
Carlin: Well what happened is before tape recorders were common, you would go to a booth in an amusement park or something and put a quarter in and for a minute you could record your voice. It used to say "Record your voice, send a letter to your loved one in the service" or something and I used to go in there and do my little routines, my childhood routines. Imitating newsmen, imitating sports announcers, imitating commercials on radio and TV. So when I was twelve years old, I made about eight of these and we've included them in the box set.

== Track listing ==
=== Disc 1: FM & AM ===
1. Shoot (5:55)
2. The Hair Piece (2:53)
3. Sex in Commercials (5:20)
4. Drugs (4:23)
5. Birth Control (5:10)
6. Son of Wino (6:31)
7. Divorce Game (4:29)
8. Ed Sullivan Self Taught (3:26)
9. Let's Make a Deal (4:48)
10. 11 O'Clock News (7:10)

=== Disc 2: Class Clown ===
1. Class Clown (16:06)
2. Wasting Time: Sharing a Swallow (2:27)
3. Values (How Much Is That Dog Crap in the Window?) (5:13)
4. I Used to Be Irish Catholic (2:57)
5. The Confessional (4:11)
6. Special Dispensation: Heaven, Hell. Purgatory and Limbo (3:42)
7. Heavy Mysteries (1:59)
8. Muhammad Ali-America the Beautiful (4:34)
9. Seven Words You Can Never Say on Television (7:00)

=== Disc 3: Occupation: Foole ===
1. Welcome to My Job (3:02)
2. Occupation: Foole (3:41)
3. White Harlem (4:45)
4. Hallway Groups (2:05)
5. Black Consciousness (2:37)
6. New York Voices (7:04)
7. Grass Swept the Neighborhood (1:25)
8. Childhood Cliches (4:02)
9. Cute Little Farts (5:10)
10. Raisin Rhetoric (2:04)
11. Filthy Words (11:32)

=== Disc 4: Toledo Window Box ===
1. Goofy Shit (3:58)
2. Toledo Window Box (4:55)
3. Nursery Rhymes (4:13)
4. Some Werds (7:56)
5. Water Sez (1:03)
6. The Metric System (2:06)
7. God (6:42)
8. Gay Lib (2:05)
9. Snot, the Original Rubber Cement (2:52)
10. Urinals Are 50 Percent Universal (2:25)
11. A Few More Farts (5:53)

=== Disc 5: An Evening with Wally Londo Featuring Bill Slaszo ===
1. New News (4:19)
2. Teenage Masturbation (4:52)
3. Mental Hot Foots (2:53)
4. High on the Plane (4:28)
5. Bodily Functions (5:42)
6. Wurds (1:00)
7. For Name's Sake (6:56)
8. Baseball - Football (2:01)
9. Good Sports (2:28)
10. Flesh Colored Band-Aids (2:47)
11. Religious Lift (3:30)
12. Radio Dial (1:50)
13. Y'ever (2:28)
14. Unrelated Things (2:21)

=== Disc 6: On the Road ===
1. On the Road (4:45)
2. Death and Dying (13:48)
3. News (4:24)
4. Kids Are Too Small (3:10)
5. Rules, Rules, Rules! (2:31)
6. Parents' Cliches and Children's Secret Answers (3:18)
7. Words We Leave Behind (1:55)
8. Dogs (5:03)
9. Supermarkets (7:01)

=== Disc 7: Free Complimentary Extra Bonus Disc Not for Sale Anywhere! ===
1. George's Disc Jockey Theme and Show Opening (0:59)
2. Tattoos (3:12)
3. Hitchhiking (Short version) (0:55)
4. Clerks, Hankies & Emma (5:16)
5. Elmo's Song - Johnny Badcheck (1:12)
6. Monopoly (4:03)
7. New Sports (4:16)
8. Hitchhiking (Long version) (1:48)
9. Guacamole (0:44)
10. Nuts in Cake and Toenail Clippings (1:41)
11. 400,000 American Musical Favorites (6:26)
12. Peas (5:56)
13. Losing Your Place (6:18)
14. I'm Musical (7:00)
15. Lost and Found (3:19)
16. Public Affairs (4:18)
17. Snapper Lawn Mowers (2:34)
18. How to Handle a Heckler (1:05)
19. Closing (1:47)
20. The Coney Island Recordings (unlisted track) (8:40)
