= Geraldine Jones (character) =

Fictional character played by Flip Wilson

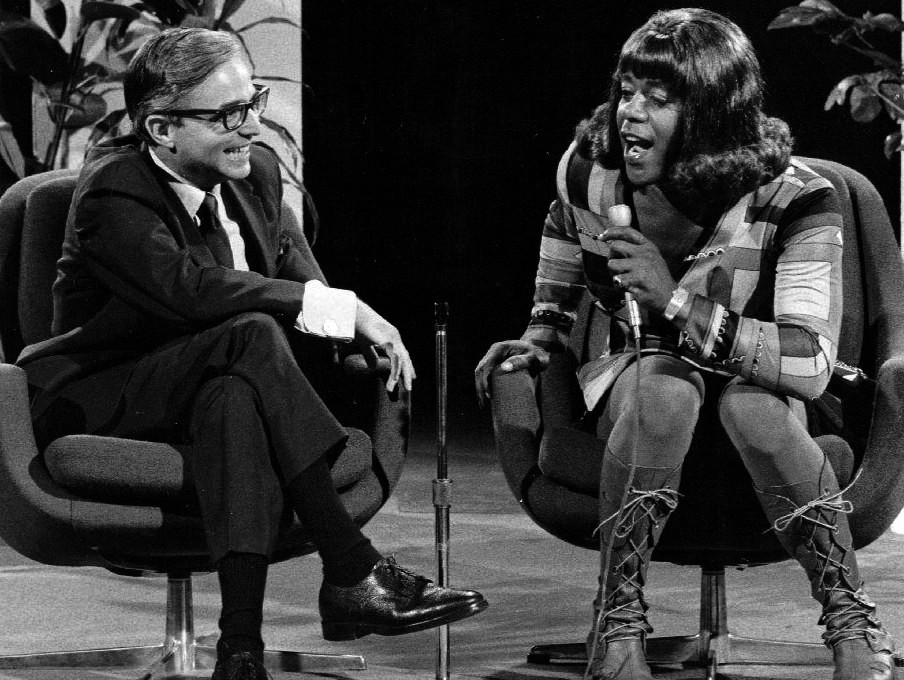
- Geraldine interviews sex expert Dr. David Reuben (1971)
- First appearance: September 1, 1969
- Created by: Flip Wilson

Geraldine Jones is a fictional African American character and the most famous recurring persona of comedian Flip Wilson. Geraldine was played by Wilson in drag, as a sassy and liberated Southern woman who was coarsely flirty yet faithful to her (unseen) boyfriend "Killer". She was direct and confident and did not change her persona to suit anyone. Several catchphrases popularized by Geraldine entered American popular culture, especially "When you're hot, you're hot; when you're not, you're not", "The Devil made me do it", and "What you see is what you get!"

Wilson portrayed Geraldine many times in the early 1970s on his variety series The Flip Wilson Show, though not on every episode. He made comedy albums featuring Geraldine, notably The Devil Made Me Buy This Dress, and he appeared as Geraldine on other programs such as Saturday Night Live. He sang and danced as Geraldine at the Kennedy Center in 1983 for Bob Hope's 80th birthday celebration. Wilson tired of the Geraldine character late in his career; he responded to most requests by saying: "She's retired."

== Origin ==
Since the mid-1960s, Wilson had been using high-pitched voices to characterize women in his comedy routines. He said he was inspired by Butterfly McQueen's innocent depiction of "Prissy", Scarlett O'Hara's maid in the 1939 film Gone with the Wind. He used a high, brassy voice to portray, from a black perspective, both Queen Isabella (introduced as Queen Isabel Johnson) and a West Indian woman in a comedy routine titled "Christopher Columbus", appearing on his 1967 album Cowboys and Colored People. Wilson worked at developing his own version of the voice, imagining a black Southern woman living in a rural area. He performed embryonic Geraldine-type routines at stand-up comedy clubs, but not wearing women's clothing and not with the name Geraldine.

Wilson said he got the name Geraldine from a friend he had when he was eight or nine, a pretty girl that did not return his adoration. He said he always held a warm regard for her.

The character of Geraldine was intended by Wilson to "relate to women" without putting them down. Wilson said he wanted Geraldine to be strong, proud, and honest in her dedication to her man—a woman who felt free to act spontaneously. In contrast to other comedians who belittled women, Wilson wanted Geraldine to be "the heroine of the story."

== Introduction ==
Wilson first introduced Geraldine by name and appearance in a comedy sketch on Labor Day, September 1, 1969, within a television special put together by Wilson, his manager Monte Kay, and NBC executives. The show was called The Flip Wilson Special. In the skit, comedian Jonathan Winters, dressed in drag as his popular character Maude Frickert—a gray-haired lady with a sharp tongue—was a passenger in an airliner. Wilson's Geraldine character entered, walking down the jet's aisle in a stewardess's miniskirt and a bouffant flip hairdo topped by a pillbox hat. Geraldine sat down next to Maude, and the comedic interaction was immediately infectious. Wilson said that Winters was chosen because his Maude character was well-known and because there would be several points of comic tension: both men playing women, the generational difference in apparent age, and the difference in race.

Wilson also performed as Geraldine on The Ed Sullivan Show on January 11, 1970. In the routine, Wilson takes on the persona of a preacher's wife. The wife (Geraldine) explains to her angry husband why she has an expensive new dress, telling him that "the devil made me buy this dress". This skit was also performed by Wilson on his fourth comedy album, The Devil Made Me Buy This Dress—its title taken from Geraldine's retort. The album, featuring Geraldine on the cover, was certified Gold, and it won the 1970 Grammy Award for Best Comedy Recording.

== Production ==
The Flip Wilson Special was seen by 42% of all U.S. television viewers; this success led to NBC signing Wilson to The Flip Wilson Show. Wilson portrayed Geraldine many times during the four-year run of the show. Geraldine was cast in skits with a number of guests on the show, including David Frost, Richard Pryor, George Carlin, Lily Tomlin (playing Ernestine), Joe Namath, Jim Brown, Arte Johnson, Moms Mabley, Sammy Davis Jr., Tim Conway, Ray Charles, Lola Falana, Perry Como, and Muhammad Ali.

On television, Geraldine wore $500 dresses designed by Emilio Pucci and $50 shoes. It took Wilson 20 minutes to prepare for the role, including having makeup applied by a cosmetician and the setting of a wig. After the first TV special, Wilson was asked by NBC executives to reduce the size of Geraldine's bust, which he did. Geraldine often made reference to her boyfriend "Killer", who was not shown; following his television success, Wilson drove a series of Rolls-Royce cars, each one named KILLER as established by his vanity plate.

Wilson developed other characters such as Sonny, the White House janitor who seemed better informed than the president; Freddy the Playboy, who was never successful in his constant quest for a date; and Wilson's second-most popular character—the larcenous and lecherous Reverend Leroy of the Church of What's Happenin' Now. Geraldine, however, received more attention from the media, gaining a cover photo on Ebony magazine in December 1970, Jet magazine in January 1971, and another Jet cover in January 1983.

== Legacy ==
The character of Geraldine has been compared to previous depictions of fictional African American women, from Hattie McDaniel's silver screen portrayal of "Mammy" in Gone with the Wind (1939) to television's Sapphire Stevens, the wife of Kingfish on the Amos 'n' Andy show, played by Ernestine Wade in the 1950s.

Professor Marjorie Garber writes that Geraldine was, in the early 1970s, television's favorite transvestite alter-ego. Wilson contributed to U.S. culture in several ways, for instance, by helping to popularize Pigmeat Markham's earlier catchphrase, "Here come da judge", and by introducing to a wider audience the practice of prearranged complex handshakes combined with the bumping of hips and elbows, but his Geraldine character's influence was greater. She planted three long-lived catchphrases: "When you're hot, you're hot; when you're not, you're not", "The devil made me do it", and "What you see is what you get!" The last was made into the acronym WYSIWYG by computer engineers to designate a text editing system that appears on screen much as it will appear in print.

Geraldine has influenced subsequent fictional characters, notably Martin's Sheneneh Jenkins, played by Martin Lawrence in the 1990s; In Living Color's Wanda Wayne, played by Jamie Foxx in the early '90s; Ella Mitchell's Hattie Mae Pierce, the title role of the 2000 film Big Momma's House; and Tyler Perry's recurring character Madea (1999–present). Today, Wilson's portrayal of Geraldine can be seen in rebroadcasts of the 1970s The Flip Wilson Show, shown on Magic Johnson's aspireTV.
