= Monte Kay =

- Born: September 18, 1924; New York City, U.S.
- Died: May 25, 1988 (aged 63) Los Angeles, California, U.S.
- Occupations: Music producer, club manager, television producer
- Formerly of: Miles Davis; Herbie Mann; Stan Getz; Sonny Rollins; Modern Jazz Quartet; Flip Wilson

Monte Kay (September 18, 1924 – May 25, 1988) was an American music agent and record producer.

Kay acted as a talent scout and musical director of several night clubs on the New York jazz scene in the late 1940s and 1950s. According to some accounts, during those years, the Caucasian Kay would sometimes introduce himself as a fair-skinned African American. In May and June 1945, Mal Braveman and Kay's New Jazz Foundation produced concerts at New York's Town Hall that included Dizzy Gillespie, Pearl Bailey, Erroll Garner, Don Byas, Charlie Parker, Max Roach and Sidney Catlett. As the artistic director of the Royal Roost (a jazz venue on 52nd Street) he succeeded in persuading the owner, Ralph Watkins, to hire Miles Davis's nonet—sometimes called the "Tuba Band"—with which Davis was pursuing a project that gave birth to the cool jazz movement later to be called Birth of the Cool. Kay befriended Davis and, during his later marriage to singer and actress Diahann Carroll, was for a time Miles' neighbor.

In 1949, he founded the jazz club Birdland (later, he would also open another jazz club, Le Downbeat, in Chicago). During the 1950s, Kay produced several musicians, including Herbie Mann, Stan Getz, Sonny Rollins and the Modern Jazz Quartet. In the same period, he married (1956–1963) singer and actress Diahann Carroll. Their daughter, Suzanne Kay, is a journalist and television author.

In 1963, Kay became the manager of the comedian Flip Wilson. The two formed the record label Little David Records, which featured comedy albums by Wilson, George Carlin and others. Kay was executive producer of the TV show The Flip Wilson Show.

Kay died of heart failure in Los Angeles in 1988.
