= Flip Wilson =

American comedian and actor (1933–1998)

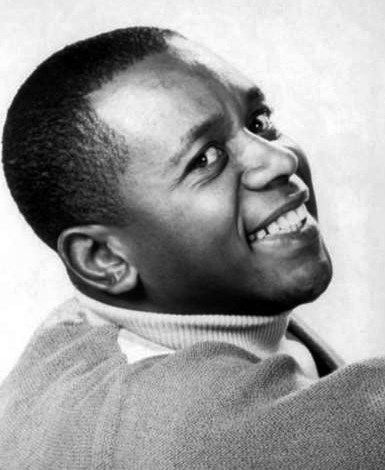
- Wilson in 1969
- Born: Clerow Wilson Jr. December 8, 1933; Jersey City, New Jersey, U.S.
- Died: November 25, 1998 (aged 64); Malibu, California, U.S.
- Notable work: The Flip Wilson Show
- Spouses: Lavenia Patricia "Peaches" Wilson Dean (m. 1957; div. 1967) Tuanchai "Cookie" MacKenzie (m. 1979; div. 1984)
- Partner: Blonell Pittman (c. 1959-1976)
- Children: 5

Comedy career
- Years active: 1959–1998
- Medium: Stand-up, television, film

Clerow "Flip" Wilson Jr. (December 8, 1933 – November 25, 1998) was an American comedian and actor best known for his television appearances during the late 1960s and 1970s. From 1970 to 1974, Wilson hosted his own weekly variety series The Flip Wilson Show, and introduced viewers to his recurring character Geraldine. The series earned Wilson a Golden Globe and two Emmy Awards, and it was the second highest-rated show on network television for a time.

Wilson was the first African American comedian to host a successful TV variety show. (Note: Nat King Cole was the first African American entertainer to host a television variety show, in 1956. Sammy Davis Jr. hosted a short-lived variety show in 1966.) In January 1972, Time magazine featured Wilson's image on its cover and named him "TV's first black superstar". He released a number of comedy albums in the 1960s and 1970s and won a Grammy Award for his 1970 album The Devil Made Me Buy This Dress. (Note: Some sources, including Wilson's obituary in The New York Times, erroneously state that Wilson won his Grammy in 1968 for his album Flip Wilson You Devil You.)

Wilson kept performing and acting into the 1990s, though at a reduced schedule, until his death from cancer in 1998. He hosted a short-lived revival of People Are Funny in 1984, and he had the lead role in the 1985–1986 sitcom Charlie & Co.

== Early life ==
Born Clerow Wilson Jr. in Jersey City, New Jersey, he was one of ten children born to Cornelia Bullock and Clerow Wilson Sr. His father worked as a handyman but, because of the Great Depression, was often out of work. When Wilson was seven years old, his mother abandoned the family. His father was unable to care for the children alone and he placed many of them in foster homes.

After bouncing from foster homes to reform school, sixteen-year-old Wilson lied about his age and joined the United States Air Force. His outgoing personality and funny stories made him popular; he was even asked to tour military bases to cheer up other servicemen. Claiming that he was always "flipped out", Wilson's barracks mates gave him the nickname "Flip", which he used as his stage name. He was stationed on Guam.

Discharged from the Air Force in 1954, Wilson started working as a bellhop in San Francisco's Manor Plaza Hotel. At the Plaza's nightclub, Wilson found extra work playing a drunken patron between regularly scheduled acts. His inebriated character proved popular and Wilson began performing it in clubs throughout California. At first Wilson would simply ad-lib onstage, but eventually he added written material and his act became more sophisticated.

== Career ==
In the late 1950s and early 1960s, Wilson toured regularly through nightclubs with a black clientele in the so-called "Chitlin' Circuit". During the 1960s, Wilson became a regular at the Apollo Theater in Harlem. An unexpected break came in 1965, when comedian Redd Foxx was a guest on The Tonight Show and host Johnny Carson asked him who was the funniest comedian at the time; Foxx answered, "Flip Wilson". Carson then booked Wilson to appear on The Tonight Show and Wilson became a favorite guest on that show as well as on The Ed Sullivan Show. Wilson later singled out Sullivan as providing his biggest career boost. Wilson also made guest appearances on numerous TV comedies and variety shows, such as Here's Lucy (in which he played the role of "Prissy" in a spoof of Gone with the Wind with Lucille Ball as Scarlett), Laugh-In, and The Dean Martin Show, among others.

Wilson's warm and ebullient personality was infectious. Richard Pryor told Wilson, "You're the only performer that I've ever seen who goes on the stage and the audience hopes that you like them."

A routine titled "Columbus", from the 1967 album Cowboys and Colored People, brought Wilson to Hollywood industry attention. In this bit, Wilson retells the story of Christopher Columbus from an anachronistic urbanized viewpoint in which Columbus convinces the Spanish monarchs to fund his voyage by noting that discovering America means that he can also discover Ray Charles. Hearing this, Queen "Isabel Johnson", whose voice is an early version of Wilson's eventual "Geraldine" character, says that "Chris" can have "all the money you want, honey – You go find Ray Charles!" When Columbus departs from the dock, an inebriated Isabella is there, testifying to one and all that "Chris gonna find Ray Charles!"

In 1970, Wilson won a Grammy Award for his comedy album The Devil Made Me Buy This Dress. He was also a regular cast member on Rowan & Martin's Laugh-In. DePatie-Freleng Enterprises featured Wilson in two animated TV specials, Clerow Wilson and the Miracle of P.S. 14 and Clerow Wilson's Great Escape.

=== The Flip Wilson Show ===
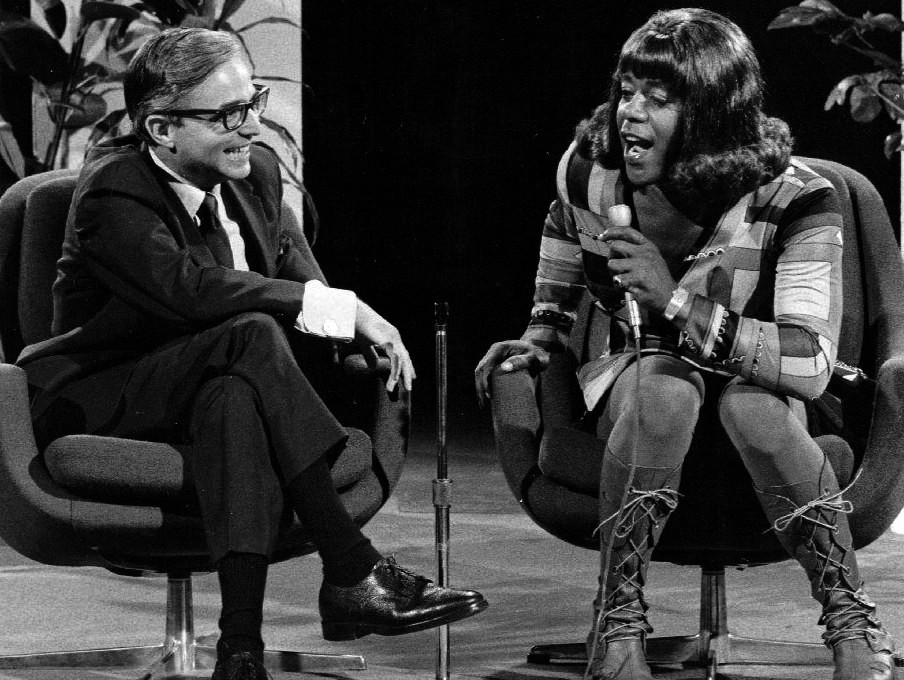
Flip Wilson as Geraldine Jones interviews sex expert Dr. David Reuben in a sketch from The Flip Wilson Show (1971)

In 1970, Wilson's variety series, The Flip Wilson Show, debuted on NBC. He performed in comedy sketches and played host to many African-American entertainers, including Lena Horne, Harry Belafonte, Diahann Carroll, the Supremes, the Jackson Five, Aretha Franklin, the Temptations, Gladys Knight & the Pips, Melba Moore, Redd Foxx, boxer Muhammad Ali and basketball player Bill Russell. He greeted all his guests with the "Flip Wilson Handshake": four hand slaps, two elbow bumps, finishing with two hip-bumps. George Carlin was one of the show's writers, and Carlin also made frequent appearances on the show, as the two would expand Carlin's news-weather-sports satire. Wilson's characters included Reverend Leroy, the materialistic pastor of the "Church of What’s Happnin' Now", and his most popular character, Geraldine Jones, who frequently referred to her unseen boyfriend, "Killer", and whose lines "The devil made me do it" as well as "What you see is what you get" became national catchphrases.

The Flip Wilson Show aired through 1974, generating high ratings and popularity among viewers and winning strong critical acclaim, with 11 Emmy Award nominations during its run, winning two. Wilson also won a Golden Globe Award for Best Actor in a Television Series.

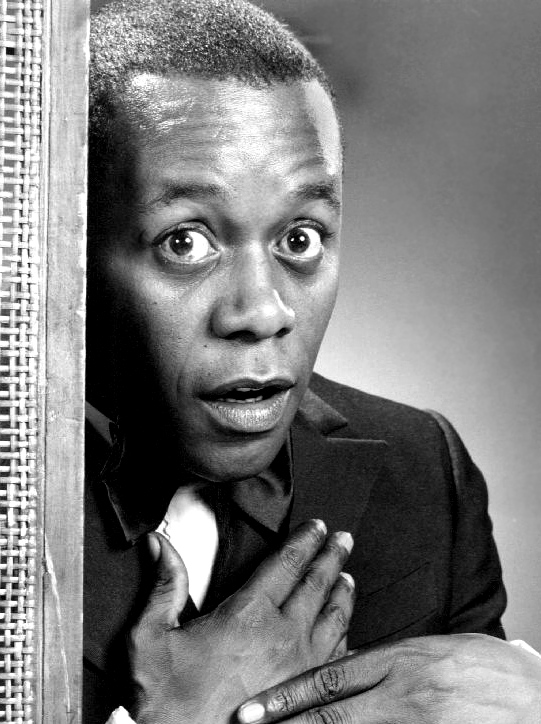
Wilson in 1970

=== Later years ===
Wilson acted in TV and theatrical movies, including Uptown Saturday Night and The Fish that Saved Pittsburgh. In 1976, he appeared as the Fox in a television musical adaptation of Pinocchio, starring Sandy Duncan in the title role and Danny Kaye as Geppetto, with songs by Laugh-In composer Billy Barnes. In November of the same year, he hosted Nadia: From Romania With Love, an upbeat, one-hour TV special featuring Olympic gymnastics champion Nadia Comaneci. In 1981, he made a guest appearance on The Love Boat. On December 10, 1983, Wilson hosted NBC's Saturday Night Live, giving what could be considered a master's class in comedy for Eddie Murphy and Joe Piscopo, with his opening Geraldine sketch.

During March–July 1984, Wilson hosted a revival of People are Funny. In 1985–1986, Wilson played the lead role in the CBS sitcom Charlie & Co. Two of his last TV appearances were cameos on the sitcoms Living Single in 1993, and The Drew Carey Show in 1996.

== Personal life ==
Wilson was married twice. In 1957, he married Lavenia Patricia "Peaches" Wilson (née Dean); they divorced in 1967. He had four children with his common-law wife Blonell Pitman before they divorced in 1976. After winning custody of his children in 1979, Wilson performed less in order to spend more time with them. In 1979, he married Tuanchai "Cookie" MacKenzie; they divorced in 1984.

In March 1981, Wilson was arrested and charged with possession of a small quantity of cocaine.

In 1993, a motorcycle accident left Wilson's son David paralyzed.

During a 1997 visit to the Howard Stern Show, Wilson divulged that he had a penile implant.

== Death ==
On November 25, 1998, Wilson died from metastatic liver cancer in Malibu, California. He was cremated at Pierce Brothers Westwood Village Memorial Park and Mortuary. His ashes were scattered off Malibu Beach.

== Discography ==
- 1961 — Flippin' (Minit)
- 1964 — Flip Wilson's Pot Luck (Scepter, reissued as Funny and Live at the Village Gate, Springboard)
- 1967 — Cowboys and Colored People (Atlantic)
- 1968 — You Devil You (Atlantic)
- 1970 — The Devil Made Me Buy This Dress (Little David)
- 1970 — The Flip Wilson Show (Little David)
- 1970 — Flipped Out (Sunset Records)
- 1972 — Geraldine (Little David)

== In popular culture ==
Wilson popularized the phrase "The devil made me do it." The catchphrase "What you see is what you get," often used by Wilson's Geraldine character, inspired researchers at PARC (and elsewhere) to create the acronym WYSIWYG for computer software.

== Bibliography ==
- "Wilson, Flip". Encyclopædia Britannica. 1998. 9124128.
- Miles, J.H.; Davis, J.J.; Ferguson-Roberts, S.E.; Giles, R.G. (2001). Almanac of African American Heritage. Paramus, NJ: Prentice Hall Press. ISBN 978-0735202269.
- Potter, J. (2002). African American Firsts. New York, NY: Kensington Publishing Corp. ISBN 978-0758292414.
