= The Flip Wilson Show =

American variety television series (1970–1974)

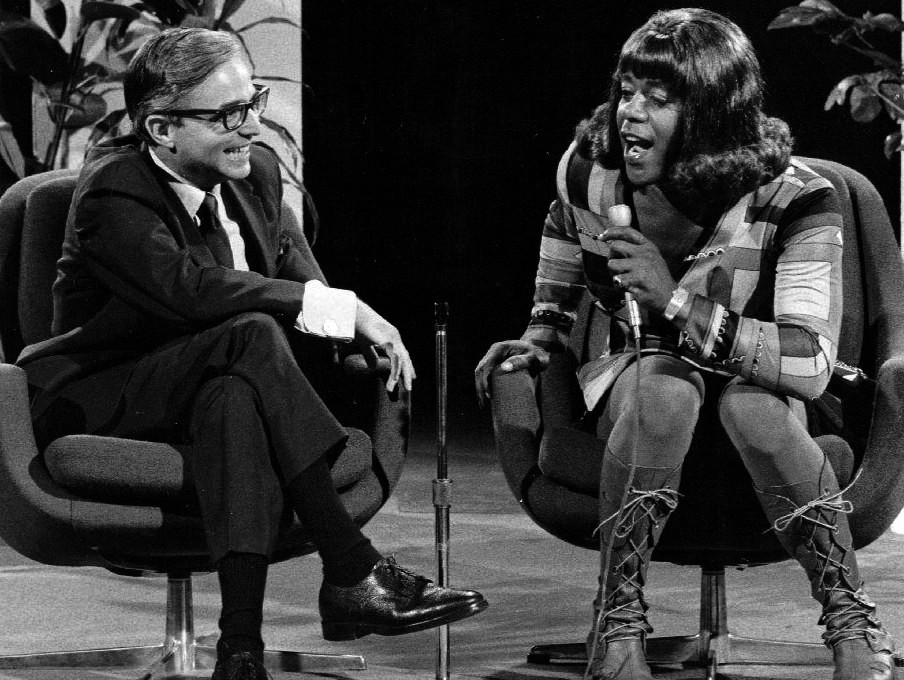
- Geraldine (Wilson) interviews sex expert Dr. David Reuben (1971)
- Starring: Flip Wilson
- Country of origin: United States
- No. of seasons: 4
- No. of episodes: 94

Production
- Running time: 60 Minutes

Original release
- Network: NBC
- Release: September 17, 1970 – June 27, 1974

The Flip Wilson Show is an hour-long variety show that originally aired in the United States on NBC from September 17, 1970, to June 27, 1974. The show starred American comedian Flip Wilson; the program was one of the first American television programs starring a black person in the title role to become highly successful with a white audience. Specifically, it was the first successful network variety series starring an African American. During its first two seasons, it was the nation's second most watched show according to Nielsen ratings.

== Overview ==
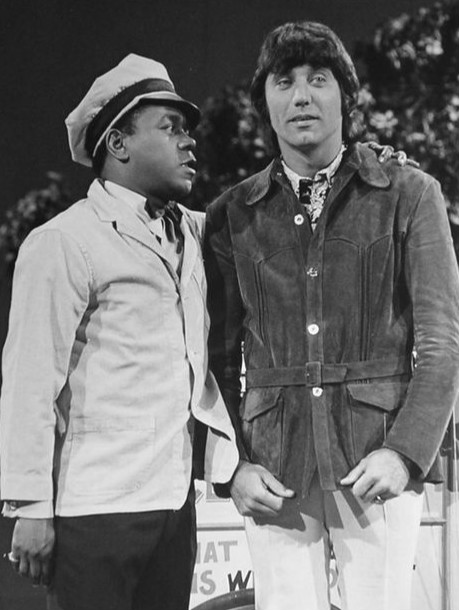
Wilson as Herbie, the ice cream man with an attitude, and guest star Joe Namath, 1972

The show consisted of many skits in a 60-minute variety format. It also broke new ground in American television by using a "theatre-in-the-round" stage format, with the audience seated on all sides of a circular performance area (with some seats located behind the sketch sets on occasion).

Wilson was most famous for creating the role of Geraldine Jones, a sassy, modern woman who had a boyfriend named Killer (who, when not in prison, was at the pool hall). Flip also created the role of Reverend Leroy, who was the minister of the Church of What's Happening Now! New parishioners were wary of coming to the church as it was hinted that Reverend Leroy was a con artist. Wilson popularized the catchphrase "The Devil made me do it!".

Geraldine Jones was a recurring character played by Wilson wearing women's clothing. Some of Geraldine's most famous quotes are, "The Devil made me buy this dress!", "Don't you touch me, honey, you don't know me that well! You devil, you!" and "What you see is what you get!"

In addition to the skits, Wilson also signed many popular singers to provide entertainment. African-American singers such as Ella Fitzgerald, James Brown, Louis Armstrong, Lena Horne, Stevie Wonder, The Jackson 5, The Chi-Lites, Ray Charles, Aretha Franklin, Gladys Knight & the Pips, The Pointer Sisters, Charley Pride, Johnny Mathis, The Temptations, and The Supremes appeared on the program, as well as many contemporary white entertainers like Bobby Darin (a frequent guest on his show), Bing Crosby (two appearances), Roy Clark, Joan Rivers, The Osmonds, Johnny Cash, Roger Miller, and Pat Boone. Usually, the singers also appeared in skits with Wilson.

Wilson's clout allowed him to get both the new breakout performers (such as The Jackson 5, Roberta Flack, Sandy Duncan, Lily Tomlin, George Carlin, Bill Cosby, Richard Pryor, Albert Brooks, Lola Falana, and Melba Moore, all of whom became popular during this period) as well as established singers. In late 1971, gospel legend Mahalia Jackson made one of her last public performances on The Flip Wilson Show.

While The Flip Wilson Show first shared a studio with other television series, Wilson's massive popularity allowed for him to get his own set of soundstages, starting in the fall 1972 season. As the seasons went on, however, the show's ratings slipped; ratings across the variety show genre began a terminal decline in the mid-1970s. This, coupled with Wilson's repeated demands for higher raises in his salary, caused the series to go over its budget and led to its cancellation.

Half-hour versions of the series aired on TV Land from 1997 to 2006. From 2011 to 2012, the show aired on TV One. From 2012 to 2016, half-hour versions of the show aired on the Aspire network. Decades presented a Weekend Binge of the half-hour version on October 8–9, 2022. Decades' successor network Catchy Comedy ran a "Catchy Binge" of the half-hour version on July 29–30, 2023, and again on April 6–7, 2024.

== Broadcast history and ratings ==
Season	Time	Rank	Rating
1 (1970–71)	Thursday at 7:30–8:30 pm	No. 2	27.9
2 (1971–72)	Thursday at 8:00–9:00 pm	No. 2	28.2
3 (1972–73)	Thursday at 8:00–9:00 pm	No. 12	23.1
4 (1973–74)	Thursday at 8:00–9:00 pm	No. 50	17.1

== Reception ==
The Flip Wilson Show won two Emmy Awards out of 18 nominations. The wins were both in 1971, for Outstanding Variety Series—Musical and Outstanding Writing Achievement in Variety or Music. Wilson won both awards, with producer Bob Henry and executive producer Monte Kay also earning statuettes for the variety series honor and Herbert Baker, Hal Goodman, Larry Klein, Bob Schiller, Bob Weiskopf and Norman Steinberg for their writing.

Other nominations included Outstanding Variety Series in 1972 and 1973; Outstanding Writing Achievement in Variety or Music in 1972 and 1973 (Dick Hills and Sid Green replaced Norman Steinberg in 1972 on the nomination, and Stan Burns, Peter Gallay, Don Hinkley, Mike Marmer and Paul McCauley replaced Hal Goodman, Larry Klein, Bob Schiller and Bob Weiskopf in 1973); Outstanding New Series in 1971; Outstanding Directorial Achievement in Variety or Music in 1971, 1972 and 1973, all for Tim Kiley; Outstanding Achievement in Live or Tape Sound Mixing in 1971 and 1972 for Dave Williams; Outstanding Achievement in Art Direction or Scenic Direction in 1971, 1972 and 1973 for Romain Johnston; Outstanding Single Program – Variety or Musical in 1972; Outstanding Achievement in Lighting Direction in 1972 for John Nance; and Outstanding Achievement in Technical Direction in 1972 for technical director Louis Fusari and cameramen Ray Figelski, Rich Lombardo, Jon Olson and Wayne Osterhoudt.

Flip Wilson won one Golden Globe award in 1971 and received two other nominations in 1972 and 1973 for Best Performance by an Actor in a Television Series – Comedy or Musical. The Flip Wilson Show received an additional Golden Globe nomination in 1972 for Best Television Series—Comedy or Musical.

== Episodes ==
Episode #		Original Air Date	Guests
Season 1
1.	1-1	17 Sep 70	David Frost, James Brown, The Muppets
2.	1-2	24 Sep 70	Roy Clark, Bobby Darin, Stanley Myron, Denise Nicholas
3.	1-3	01 Oct 70	Lily Tomlin, Redd Foxx, The Tempatations, Roger Miller
4.	1-4	08 Oct 70	Perry Como, Charlie Callas, Denise Nicholas, Lola Falana
5.	1-5	15 Oct 70	Raymond Burr, Stanley Myron Handelman, The Muppets, Loretta Long, Sunday's Child
6.	1-6	22 Oct 70	Louis Armstrong, Charlie Callas, Laura Greene, Pat Morita
7.	1-7	29 Oct 70	Bill Cosby, Gina Lolabrigida, John Sebastian
8.	1-8	06 Nov 70	Robert Goulet, Lola Falana, Robert Klein, Dean Martin
9.	1-9	13 Nov 70	Moms Mabley, Marcel Marceau, Arte Johnson, Doug Kershaw
10.	1-10	20 Nov 70	Bobby Darin, Charlie Pride, Ella Fitzgerald
11.	1-11	03 Dec 70	Stevie Wonder, Connie Stevens, John Byner, Johnny Brown
12.	1-12	10 Dec 70	Lena Horne, Tony Randall, John Lawrence
13.	1-13	17 Dec 70	Sid Caesar, Bobby Darin, B.B. King
14.	1-14	24 Dec 70	Slim Gaillard, Burl Ives, Sha-Na-Na
15.	1-15	07 Jan 71	Bing Crosby, The Supremes, David Steinberg
16.	1-16	17 Jan 71	Steve Lawrence, Zero Mostel, Roberta Flack
17.	1-17	21 Jan 71	Muhammad Ali, Lily Tomlin, Bobby Darin
18.	1-18	28 Jan 71	Bill Cosby, Claudine Longet, Nancy Wilson
19.	1-19	04 Feb 71	Joe Namath, George Carlin, Johnny Mathis, Abbey Lincoln
20.	1-20	11 Feb 71	Art Carney, Barbara Feldon, Hal Frazier, Modern Jazz Quartet
21.	1-21	18 Feb 71	Aretha Franklin, David Frost, Charlie Callas
22.	1-22	25 Feb 71	Don Rickles, Leslie Uggams, Ray Charles
23.	1-23	04 Mar 71	Tim Conway, Diahann Carroll, Robert Klein
24.	1-24	11 Mar 71	George Carlin, Lena Horne, Ray Stevens
25.	1-25	18 Mar 71	Hamilton Camp, Lily Tomlin, Gaylord & Holiday
26.	1-26	01 Apr 71	Johnny Brown, Raymond Burr, Tim Conway, Sandy Duncan
Season 2
27.	2-1	16 Sep 71	Lucille Ball, Ed Sullivan, Osmond Brothers
28.	2-2	23 Sep 71	George Gobel, Joan Rivers, Mahalia Jackson
29.	2-3	30 Sep 71	Raymond Burr, Ruth Gordon, Stevie Wonder
30.	2-4	07 Oct 71	Tim Conway, Ruth Buzzi, Erroll Garner
31.	2-5	14 Oct 71	Pat Boone & Family, George Carlin, Sugar Ray Robinson
32.	2-6	21 Oct 71	David Frost, The Supremes, Willie Tyler & Lester
33.	2-7	28 Oct 71	The Smothers Brothers, Melba Moore
34.	2-8	04 Nov 71	The Jackson 5, Lily Tomlin, Dr. David Rueben
35.	2-9	11 Nov 71	Dom DeLuise, Diahann Carroll, the Muppets
36.	2-10	18 Nov 71	Tim Conway, Andy Griffith, Clara Ward
37.	2-11	25 Nov 71	Sid Caesar, Carl Reiner, Lena Horne
38.	2-12	02 Dec 71	Phyllis Diller, Billy Eckstine, Tony Randall
39.	2-13	16 Dec 71	Petula Clark, Roy Clark, Redd Foxx
40.	2-14	23 Dec 71	Melba Moore, Jimmy Osmond, Marty Feldman
41.	2-15	30 Dec 71	Carol Channing, David Steinberg, Modern Jazz Quartet
42.	2-16	06 Jan 72	Ray Charles, Dan Blocker, Kaye Ballard
43.	2-17	13 Jan 72	Tim Conway, Bobby Darin, Redd Foxx
44.	2-18	20 Jan 72	George Carlin, Aretha Franklin, Dom DeLuise
45.	2-19	27 Jan 72	Jim Brown, Johnny Cash, June Carter
46.	2-20	03 Feb 72	Phil Silvers, B.B. King, Barbara Feldon
47.	2-21	10 Feb 72	Sandy Duncan, Jim Nabors, Slappy White
48.	2-22	17 Feb 72	Roy Clark, Barbara McNair, Stiller and Meara
49.	2-23	24 Feb 72	Joe Namath, George Carlin, Miss Black America
50.	2-24	02 Mar 72	Sammy Davis Jr., Lily Tomlin, Ed McMahon
51.	2-25	09 Mar 72	Ruth Buzzi, Lee Marvin, Jackie Vernon, Chi-Lites
52.	2-26	16 Mar 72	Bing Crosby, Tim Conway, Melba Moore
Season 3
53.	3-1	14 Sep 72	Pearl Bailey, the Muppets, Jack Benny
54.	3-2	21 Sep 72	The Fifth Dimension, Tim Conway
55.	3-3	28 Sep 72	Melba Moore, Don Knotts, Dan Hicks & Hot Licks
56.	3-4	05 Oct 72	Ruth Buzzi, Burns and Schreiber, the Supremes
57.	3-5	12 Oct 72	Stiller and Meara, Bill Russell, Kenny Rankin, Paul McCartney and Wings (video)
58.	3-6	26 Oct 72	Diana Sands, David Steinberg, the Jackson Five
59.	3-7	02 Nov 72	Carol Channing, Ed Asner, Donny Hathaway
60.	3-8	09 Nov 72	Don Adams, the Staple Singers, Roscoe Lee Browne
61.	3-9	16 Nov 72	Burt Reynolds, Roberta Flack, Tim Conway
62.	3-10	23 Nov 72	The Temptations, Joan Rivers, Frank Gorshin
63.	3-11	30 Nov 72	Raymond Burr, Dom DeLuise, Gladys Knight and the Pips
64.	3-12	07 Dec 72	Tony Randal, Dionne Warwick, Burns and Schreiber
65.	3-13	14 Dec 72	Albert Brooks, Bill Russell, Johnny Cash & June Carter
66.	3-14	21 Dec 72	Tim Conway, Slappy White, Rita Coolidge, Kris Kristofferson
67.	3-15	04 Jan 73	Jim Nabors, James Coco, Barbara McNair
68.	3-16	11 Jan 73	Andy Griffith, Curtis Mayfield, Roscoe Lee Browne
69.	3-17	18 Jan 73	Howard Cosell, Marty Feldman, Taj Mahal
70.	3-18	25 Jan 73	Sammy Davis Jr., Marilyn Michaels, Ed Sullivan
71.	3-19	01 Feb 73	Ray Charles, Phyllis Diller, The Committee
72.	3-20	08 Feb 73	Dom DeLuise, Helen Reddy, Diana Sands, Kreskin
73.	3-21	15 Feb 73	Roy Clark, George Carlin, Della Reese
74.	3-22	22 Feb 73	Rich Little, Ed McMahon, Cicely Tyson, Bill Withers
75.	3-23	01 Mar 73	Tim Conway, Joe Namath, Papa John Creach
76.	3-24	08 Mar 73	Don Knotts, Richard Pryor, Oscar Brown Jr, Jean Pace
Season 4
77.	4-1	20 Sep 73	Buddy Hackett, Ruth Buzzi, Richard Pryor, William Attmore II, Flippettes
78.	4-2	27 Sep 73	The Pointer Sisters, Monty Hall, Sandy Duncan, William Windom
79.	4-3	04 Oct 73	Richard Pryor, Ralph Edwards, Bobby Sandler, Nat Purefoy
80.	4-4	11 Oct 73	Redd Foxx, Joan Rivers, Helen Reddy
81.	4-5	18 Oct 73	Burns & Schreiber, Falumi Prince, Harry Belafonte
82.	4-6	25 Oct 73	Robert Goulet, Carol Lawrence, Slappy White
83.	4-7	01 Nov 73	Lee Grant, Gladys Knight and the Pips, Andrew Johnson, Henry Aaron
84.	4-8	15 Nov 73	Tim Conway, Richard Pryor & Romark the Mentalist
85.	4-9	29 Nov 73	Ed McMahon, Leonard Nimoy, Charlie Callas
86.	4-10	06 Dec 73	Stiller and Meara, Aretha Franklin, Tim Conway
87.	4-11	13 Dec 73	The Fifth Dimension, Burns and Schreiber
88.	4-12	20 Dec 73	Anthony Newley, Jack Klugman, Roscoe Browne, Ajaye
89.	4-13	03 Jan 74	Pointer Sisters, Ted Knight, Philip Paley
90.	4-14	10 Jan 74	Roy Clark, George Carlin, Della Reese
91.	4-15	17 Jan 74	Steve Lawrence, Richard Pryor, Kitty Lester
92.	4-16	07 Feb 74	Dennis Weaver, O.J. Simpson, Len Glascow, Ernie Robinson
93.	4-17	21 Feb 74	Don Adams, Redd Foxx, McLean Stevenson, Mac Davis
94.	4-18	28 Feb 74	Tony Randall, Bob Elliott & Ray Goulding, Lena Horne
95.	4-19	07 Mar 74	Andy Williams, Jonathan Winters, Arte Johnson, Bob Hope
