= Eardrum Records =

Record label formed by George Carlin

- Country of origin: United States

Eardrum Records was a record label owned by American comedian George Carlin, who formed the label in 1986. He then bought out Little David Records, the label that previously released his material.

Eardrum was distributed by Atlantic Records, which had also distributed Little David, and Carlin was the sole artist on the label until his death. Eardrum released all of Carlin's later recordings starting with Playin’ with Your Head in 1986 and also remastered and reissued Carlin's classic Little David albums on CD.

== See also ==
- List of record labels
