= List of HBO Documentary Films films =

This is a list of films produced and distributed by HBO Documentary Films.

== 1990s ==
Release date	Title	Notes
June 10, 1996	Paradise Lost: The Child Murders at Robin Hood Hills	
July 9, 1997	4 Little Girls	
January 21, 1998	Frat House	

== 2000s ==
Release date	Title	Notes
March 13, 2000	Paradise Lost 2: Revelations	
April 22, 2001	Just, Melvin: Just Evil	
January 22, 2002	Britney Spears Live from Las Vegas	
April 30, 2003	Spellbound	distributed by ThinkFilm
May 30, 2003	Capturing the Friedmans	distributed by Magnolia Pictures
February 11, 2005	Inside Deep Throat	distributed by Universal Pictures and Imagine Entertainment
April 18, 2007	Autism: The Musical	
August 6, 2007	White Light/Black Rain: The Destruction of Hiroshima and Nagasaki	
July 24, 2009	One Minute to Nine	
August 7, 2009	By the People: The Election of Barack Obama	

== 2010s ==
Release date	Title	Notes
January 24, 2010	12th & Delaware	
March 10, 2010	Magic & Bird: A Courtship of Rivals	
November 22, 2010	Public Speaking	
May 7, 2011	Lady Gaga Presents the Monster Ball Tour: At Madison Square Garden	
July 11, 2011	Love Crimes of Kabul	
January 12, 2012	Paradise Lost 3: Purgatory	
December 6, 2012	In Vogue: The Editor's Eye	
February 16, 2013	Beyoncé: Life Is But a Dream	
April 8, 2013	50 Children: The Rescue Mission of Mr. and Mrs. Kraus	
May 1, 2013	Manhunt: The Search for Bin Laden	
July 15, 2013	The Crash Reel	
October 28, 2013	Seduced and Abandoned	
December 9, 2013	Six by Sondheim	
June 18, 2014	Love Child	
September 20, 2014	On the Run Tour: Beyoncé and Jay-Z	
October 11, 2014	Banksy Does New York	
October 24, 2014	Citizenfour	co-production with Participant Media and Praxis Films
December 8, 2014	Regarding Susan Sontag	
December 31, 2014	Jennifer Lopez: Dance Again	
November 25, 2015	3 1/2 Minutes, 10 Bullets	
February 22, 2016	Becoming Mike Nichols	
March 7, 2016	A Girl in the River: The Price of Forgiveness	
March 11, 2016	Beware the Slenderman	
March 21, 2016	Everything Is Copy	
December 16, 2016	Risky Drinking	
October 7, 2017	Spielberg	
November 13, 2017	War Dog: A Soldier's Best Friend	
November 20, 2017	Baltimore Rising	
December 4, 2017	The Newspaperman	
December 8, 2017	Arthur Miller: Writer	
January 19, 2018	The Final Year	
March 26 and 27, 2018	The Zen Diaries of Garry Shandling	
April 2, 2018	King in the Wilderness	
April 16, 2018	I Am Evidence	
June 25, 2018	Believer	
July 16, 2018	Robin Williams: Come Inside My Mind	
September 10, 2018	Swiped: Hooking Up in the Digital Age	
September 24, 2018	Jane Fonda in Five Acts	
January 28, 2019	Breslin and Hamill: Deadline Artists	
February 18, 2019	United Skates	
March 3, 2019	Leaving Neverland	in association with Channel 4
March 18, 2019	The Inventor: Out for Blood in Silicon Valley	
May 3, 2019	At the Heart of Gold: Inside the USA Gymnastics Scandal	
May 12, 2019	Home Videos	
May 26, 2019	Game of Thrones: The Last Watch	
May 28, 2019	Running with Beto	
June 11, 2019	Ice on Fire	
June 18, 2019	Wig	
June 26, 2019	True Justice: Bryan Stevenson's Fight for Equality	
June 30, 2019	Sermon on the Mount	
September 25, 2019	Buzz	
July 9, 2019	I Love You, Now Die: The Commonwealth V. Michelle Carter	
October 17, 2019	Liberty: Mother of Exiles	
November 12, 2019	Very Ralph	

== 2020s ==
Release date	Title	Notes
March 19, 2020	After Truth: Disinformation and the Cost of Fake News	
March 26, 2020	Kill Chain: The Cyber War on America's Elections	
May 5, 2020	Natalie Wood: What Remains Behind	
June 18, 2020	Bully. Coward. Victim. The Story of Roy Cohn	
June 30, 2020	Welcome to Chechnya	
July 14, 2020	Showbiz Kids	
July 28, 2020	Stockton on My Mind	
August 4, 2020	The Swamp	
October 6, 2020	Siempre, Luis	
October 7, 2020	Wild Card: The Downfall of a Radio Loudmouth	
October 16, 2020	The Perfect Weapon	
October 21, 2020	537 Votes	
October 27, 2020	The Soul of America	
October 28, 2020	Burning Ojai: Our Fire Story	
November 12, 2020	Transhood	
November 18, 2020	Crazy, Not Insane	
November 21, 2020	Between the World and Me	
December 2, 2020	Baby God	
December 3, 2020	40 Years a Prisoner	
December 9, 2020	Alabama Snake	
December 12, 2020	The Bee Gees: How Can You Mend a Broken Heart	
December 16, 2020	The Art of Political Murder	
February 2, 2021	Fake Famous	
February 9, 2021	Black Art: In the Absence of Light	
March 9, 2021	Covid Diaries NYC	
March 27, 2021	Tina	
March 30, 2021	The Last Cruise	
April 13, 2021	Our Towns	
May 10, 2021	The Crime of the Century	
June 15, 2021	Revolution Rent	
June 29, 2021	The Legend of the Underground	
July 23, 2021	Woodstock 99: Peace, Love, and Rage	
August 12, 2021	In the Same Breath	
October 20, 2021	Four Hours at the Capitol	in association with the BBC
November 9, 2021	Dear Rider: The Jake Burton Story	
November 15, 2021	A Choice of Weapons: Inspired by Gordon Parks	
November 16, 2021	Simple as Water	
November 18, 2021	Jagged	
November 25, 2021	DMX: Don't Try to Understand	
November 30, 2021	Life of Crime 1984-2020	
December 1, 2021	Adrienne	
December 2, 2021	Listening to Kenny G	
December 6, 2021	The Forever Prisoner	
December 7, 2021	Slow Hustle	
December 9, 2021	Mr. Saturday Night	
December 13, 2021	Street Gang: How We Got to Sesame Street	co-produced with Macrocosm Entertainment; distributed by Screen Media Films
December 14, 2021	The Murders at Starved Rock	
December 16, 2021	Juice WRLD: Into the Abyss	
December 20, 2021	Reopening Night	
December 27, 2021	Insecure: The End	
December 28, 2021	The Super Bob Einstein Movie	
February 1, 2022	Terry Bradshaw: Going Deep	
February 15, 2022	Icahn: The Restless Billionaire	
February 23, 2022	Frederick Douglass: In Five Speeches	
March 8, 2022	Undercurrent: The Disappearance of Kim Wall	
March 15, 2022	Phoenix Rising	
March 29, 2022	How to Survive a Pandemic	
March 30, 2022	When We Were Bullies	Oscar-nominated documentary short
April 5, 2022	Tony Hawk: Until The Wheels Fall Off	co-production with Duplass Brothers Productions
May 3, 2022	Spring Awakening: Those You've Known	
May 20 and 21, 2022	George Carlin's American Dream	
June 8, 2022	The Janes	co-production with Pentimento Productions
June 22, 2022	Chernobyl: The Lost Tapes	
June 28, 2022	Endangered	
July 27, 2022	We Met in Virtual Reality	
August 13, 2022	The Princess	
August 24, 2022	Katrina Babies	
September 21, 2022	Escape From Kabul	
October 11, 2022	38 at the Garden	
October 18, 2022	Mama's Boy	
October 19, 2022	Year One: A Political Odyssey	
October 26, 2022	A Tree of Life: The Pittsburgh Synagogue Shooting	
November 8, 2022	Say Hey, Willie Mays!	
November 16, 2022	Master of Light	
November 18, 2022	Camilo: El Primer Tour De Mi Vida	
November 19, 2022	2022 Rock & Roll Hall of Fame Induction Ceremony	
November 27, 2022	The Howard Stern Interview: Bruce Springsteen	
November 29, 2022	My So-Called High School Rank	
December 13, 2022	Pelosi In The House	
December 16, 2022	Sex Diaries	
December 30, 2022	This Place Rules	
February 7, 2023	All That Breathes	
March 19, 2023	All the Beauty and the Bloodshed	
April 7, 2023	Jason Isbell: Running with Our Eyes Closed	
April 29, 2023	Moonage Daydream	
May 2, 2023	1000% Me: Growing Up Mixed	
May 20, 2023	Love to Love You, Donna Summer	
May 26, 2023	Being Mary Tyler Moore	
June 14, 2023	How Do You Measure a Year?	
June 21, 2023	The Stroll	
June 27, 2023	Taylor Mac's 24-Decade History of Popular Music	
June 28, 2023	Rock Hudson: All That Heaven Allowed	
July 1, 2023	Brandi Carlile: In the Canyon Haze	
July 26, 2023	After the Bite	
August 23, 2023	BS High	
September 13, 2023	Donyale Luna: Supermodel	
October 1, 2023	The Ringleader: The Case of the Bling Ring	
October 8, 2023	Last Stop Larrimah	
October 10, 2023	No Accident	
October 15, 2023	The Insurrectionist Next Door	
October 22, 2023	AKA Mr. Chow	
November 7, 2023	Stand Up & Shout: Songs From a Philly High School	
November 8, 2023	You Were My First Boyfriend	
November 11, 2023	Albert Brooks: Defending My Life	
November 14, 2023	How We Get Free	
November 15, 2023	David Holmes: The Boy Who Lived	
November 28, 2023	South To Black Power	
December 5, 2023	Great Photo, Lovely Life	
December 12, 2023	Trees and Other Entanglements	
December 20, 2023	Daniel	
December 30, 2023	Time Bomb Y2K	
January 8, 2024	Going to Mars: The Nikki Giovanni Project	
January 19, 2024	Super/Man: The Christopher Reeve Story	
January 27, 2024	Lil Nas X: Long Live Montero	
January 31, 2024	The Unbreakable Tatiana Suarez	
March 5, 2024	A Revolution on Canvas	
March 12, 2024	The Lionheart	
March 26, 2024	The Truth vs. Alex Jones	
May 25, 2024	Gaga Chromatica Ball	
May 29, 2024	MoviePass, MovieCrash	
July 13, 2024	Faye	
August 3, 2024	Elizabeth Taylor: The Lost Tapes	
September 7, 2024	Wise Guy: David Chase and the Sopranos	
June 17, 2025	Surviving Ohio State	
June 24, 2025	Enigma	
June 27, 2025	My Mom Jayne	
September 23, 2025	The Devil Is Busy	
October 10, 2025	The Alabama Solution	
October 21, 2025	Armed Only with a Camera: The Life and Death of Brent Renaud	
November 18, 2025	Thoughts & Prayers	
March 10, 2026	Fukushima: A Nuclear Nightmare	
June 7, 2026	Earth, Wind & Fire (To Be Celestial vs That's the Weight of the World)	
June 23, 2026	The Welcome Table	
June 30, 2026	Bang My Box: The Robin Byrd Story	
July 31, 2026	Wild Inside	produced by; theatrically distributed by Sandbox Films
September 9, 2026	Band of Brothers: Legacy	

== Upcoming ==
Release date	Title	Notes
October 9, 2026	Musk	
TBA	The Larry David Story	
TBA	Untitled George Santos film	

== HBO Comedy Specials ==
Title	Premiere
Robert Klein: An Evening with Robert Klein	December 31, 1975
George Carlin at USC	April 08, 1977
Robert Klein Revisited	June 17, 1977
George Carlin: Again!	September 8, 1978
Robert Klein at Yale	May 24, 1982
George Carlin: Carlin at Carnegie	January 8, 1983
Eddie Murphy: Delirious	October 15, 1983
Billy Crystal: A Comic's Line	February 10, 1984
George Carlin: Carlin on Campus	June 22, 1984
Robert Klein: Child of the 50s, Man of the 80s	August 24, 1984
Whoopi Goldberg: Direct from Broadway	July 20, 1985
Comic Relief	March 29, 1986
George Carlin: Playin' with Your Head	June 14, 1986
Robert Klein on Broadway	July 26, 1986
Jerry Seinfeld: Stand-Up Confidential	September 5, 1987
An All-Star Toast to the Improv	January 30, 1988
Dennis Miller: Mr. Miller Goes to Washington	February 27, 1988
George Carlin: What Am I Doing in New Jersey?	June 12, 1988
Whoopi Goldberg: Fontaine... Why Am I Straight	August 6, 1988
Whoopi Goldberg Presents Billy Connolly	September 10, 1989
George Carlin: Doin' It Again	June 2, 1990
Bob Saget: In the Dream State	August 5, 1990
Dennis Miller: Black and White	December 15, 1990
Sinbad: Brain Damaged	January 12, 1991
Richard Jeni: Platypus Man	January 30, 1993
George Carlin: Jammin' in New York	April 25, 1992
Dennis Miller: Live from Washington D.C.: They Shoot HBO Specials, Don't They?	March 27, 1993
Sinbad: Afros and Bellbottoms	April 17, 1993
Rosie O'Donnell	April 29, 1995
20 Years of Comedy on HBO	August 12, 1995
Bill Maher: Stuff That Struck Me Funny	September 23, 1995
Dana Carvey: Critics' Choice	October 14, 1995
Dennis Miller: Citizen Arcane	March 2, 1996
George Carlin: Back in Town	March 30, 1996
Sinbad: Son of a Preacher Man	April 13, 1996
Chris Rock: Bring the Pain	June 1, 1996
Bill Maher: The Golden Goose Special	January 6, 1997
George Carlin: Personal Favorites	February 23, 1997
George Carlin: 40 Years of Comedy	February 28, 1997
Sinbad: Nothin' But the Funk	July 19, 1997
Richard Jeni: A Good Catholic Boy	October 4, 1997
Denis Leary: Lock 'n Load	November 15, 1997
David Spade: Take the Hit	April 17, 1998
Jerry Seinfeld: I'm Telling You for the Last Time	August 8, 1998
George Carlin: You Are All Diseased	February 6, 1999
Chris Rock: Bigger & Blacker	July 10, 1999
D. L. Hughley: Goin' Home	August 7, 1999
David Cross: The Pride Is Back	September 18, 1999
Larry David: Curb Your Enthusiasm	October 17, 1999
Dennis Miller: The Millennium Special - 1,000 Years, 100 Laughs, 10 Really Good Ones	December 4, 1999
Bill Maher: Be More Cynical	June 10, 2000
Ellen DeGeneres: The Beginning	July 23, 2000
Dave Chappelle: Killin' Them Softly	July 26, 2000
Robert Klein: Child in His 50s	December 2, 2000
George Carlin: Complaints and Grievances	November 17, 2001
The Vagina Monologues	February 14, 2002
Jamie Foxx: I Might Need Security	February 23, 2002
Dennis Miller: The Raw Feed	April 12, 2003
Ellen DeGeneres: Here and Now	June 25, 2003
Bill Maher: Victory Begins at Home	July 19, 2003
Tracey Ullman in the Trailer Tales	August 3, 2003
Chris Rock: Never Scared	April 17, 2004
Lewis Black: Black on Broadway	May 15, 2004
Elaine Stritch at Liberty	May 29, 2004
Tracey Ullman: Live and Exposed	May 14, 2005
Richard Jeni: A Big Steaming Pile of Me	January 15, 2005
Whoopi: Back to Broadway - The 20th Anniversary	April 9, 2005
Bill Maher: I'm Swiss	July 30, 2005
George Carlin: Life Is Worth Losing	November 5, 2005
Robert Klein: The Amorous Busboy of Decatur Avenue	December 3, 2005
Dennis Miller: All In	January 21, 2006
Lewis Black: Red, White, and Screwed	June 10, 2006
Cedric the Entertainer: Taking You Higher	July 15, 2006
Dane Cook: Vicious Circle	September 4, 2006
Katt Williams: The Pimp Chronicles Pt. 1	September 16, 2006
Wanda Sykes: Sick and Tired	October 14, 2006
Louis C.K.: Shameless	January 13, 2007
George Lopez: America's Mexican	February 24, 2007
Bill Maher: The Decider	July 21, 2007
Bob Saget: That Ain't Right	August 25, 2007
D. L. Hughley: Unapologetic	September 22, 2007
Jim Norton: Monster Rain	October 13, 2007
Dave Attell: Captain Miserable	December 8, 2007
George Carlin: It's Bad for Ya	March 1, 2008
Dana Carvey: Squatting Monkeys Tell No Lies	June 14, 2008
Chris Rock: Kill the Messenger	September 27, 2008
You're Welcome America. A Final Night With George W Bush	March 14, 2009
Jim Jefferies: I Swear to God	May 16, 2009
George Lopez: Tall, Dark & Chicano	August 9, 2009
Wanda Sykes: I'ma Be Me	October 10, 2009
Bill Maher: But I'm Not Wrong	February 13, 2010
Robert Klein: Unfair and Unbalanced	June 12, 2010
Tracy Morgan: Black and Blue	November 13, 2010
Dennis Miller: The Big Speech	November 19, 2010
Carrie Fisher: Wishful Drinking	December 12, 2010
Colin Quinn: Long Story Short	April 9, 2011
George Lopez: It's Not Me, It's You	July 14, 2012
Louis C.K.: Oh My God	April 13, 2013
Bob Saget: That's What I'm Talkin' About	May 10, 2013
Sarah Silverman: We Are Miracles	November 23, 2013
Billy Crystal: 700 Sundays	April 19, 2014
Katt Williams: Priceless: Afterlife	August 16, 2014
Bill Maher: Live from D.C.	September 12, 2014
Jerrod Carmichael: Love at the Store	October 4, 2014
Mel Brooks: Live at the Geffen	January 31, 2015
Rosie O'Donnell: A Heartfelt Stand Up	February 14, 2015
Tig Notaro: Boyish Girl Interrupted	August 22, 2015
Ferrell Takes the Field	September 12, 2015
Amy Schumer: Live at the Apollo	October 17, 2015
Whitney Cummings: I'm Your Girlfriend	January 23, 2016
Lady Day at Emerson's Bar & Grill	March 12, 2016
Quincy Jones: Burning the Light	June 2, 2016
Pete Holmes: Faces and Sounds	December 3, 2016
Jerrod Carmichael: 8	March 11, 2017
Chris Gethard: Career Suicide	May 6, 2017
T.J. Miller: Meticulously Ridiculous	June 17, 2017
George Lopez: The Wall, Live from Washington D.C.	August 5, 2017
Felipe Esparza: Translate This	September 30, 2017
Michelle Wolf: Nice Lady	December 2, 2017
Notes from the Field	February 25, 2018
Bill Maher: Live from Oklahoma	July 7, 2018
Drew Michael: Drew Michael	August 25, 2018
Flight of the Conchords: Live in London	October 6, 2018
Amanda Seales: I Be Knowin'	January 26, 2019
My Dad Wrote a Porno	May 11, 2019
Ramy Youssef: Feelings	June 29, 2019
My Favorite Shapes by Julio Torres	August 10, 2019
Gary Gulman: The Great Depresh	October 5, 2019
Daniel Sloss: X	November 2, 2019
Lil Rel Howery: Live in Crenshaw	November 23, 2019
Dan Soder: Son of a Gary	December 7, 2019
Whitmer Thomas: The Golden One	February 22, 2020
Yvonne Orji: Momma, I Made It	June 25, 2020
David Byrne's American Utopia	October 17, 2020
Tig Notaro: Drawn	July 24, 2021
Ricky Velez: Here's Everything	October 23, 2021
Drew Michael: Red Blue Green	December 4, 2021
Jerrod Carmichael: Rothaniel	April 1, 2022
Bill Maher: #Adulting	April 15, 2022
Nikki Glaser: Good Clean Filth	July 16, 2022
Jesus Sepulveda: Mr. Tough Life	August 5, 2022
Yvonne Orji: A Whole Me	October 1, 2022
Lil Rel Howery: I Said It, Y'all Thinking It	November 12, 2022
Atsuko Okatsuka: The Intruder	December 10, 2022
Marc Maron: From Bleak to Dark	February 11, 2023
Sarah Silverman: Someone You Love	May 27, 2023
John Early: Now More Than Ever	June 17, 2023
Sam Jay: Salute Me or Shoot Me	September 23, 2023
Leo Reich: Literally Who Cares?!	December 16, 2023
Ramy Youssef: More Feelings	March 23, 2024
Alex Edelman: Just for Us	April 6, 2024
Nikki Glaser: Someday You'll Die	May 11, 2024
Seth Meyers: Dad Man Walking	October 26, 2024
