= Gordon Parks =

American photographer, musician, writer and film director (1912–2006)

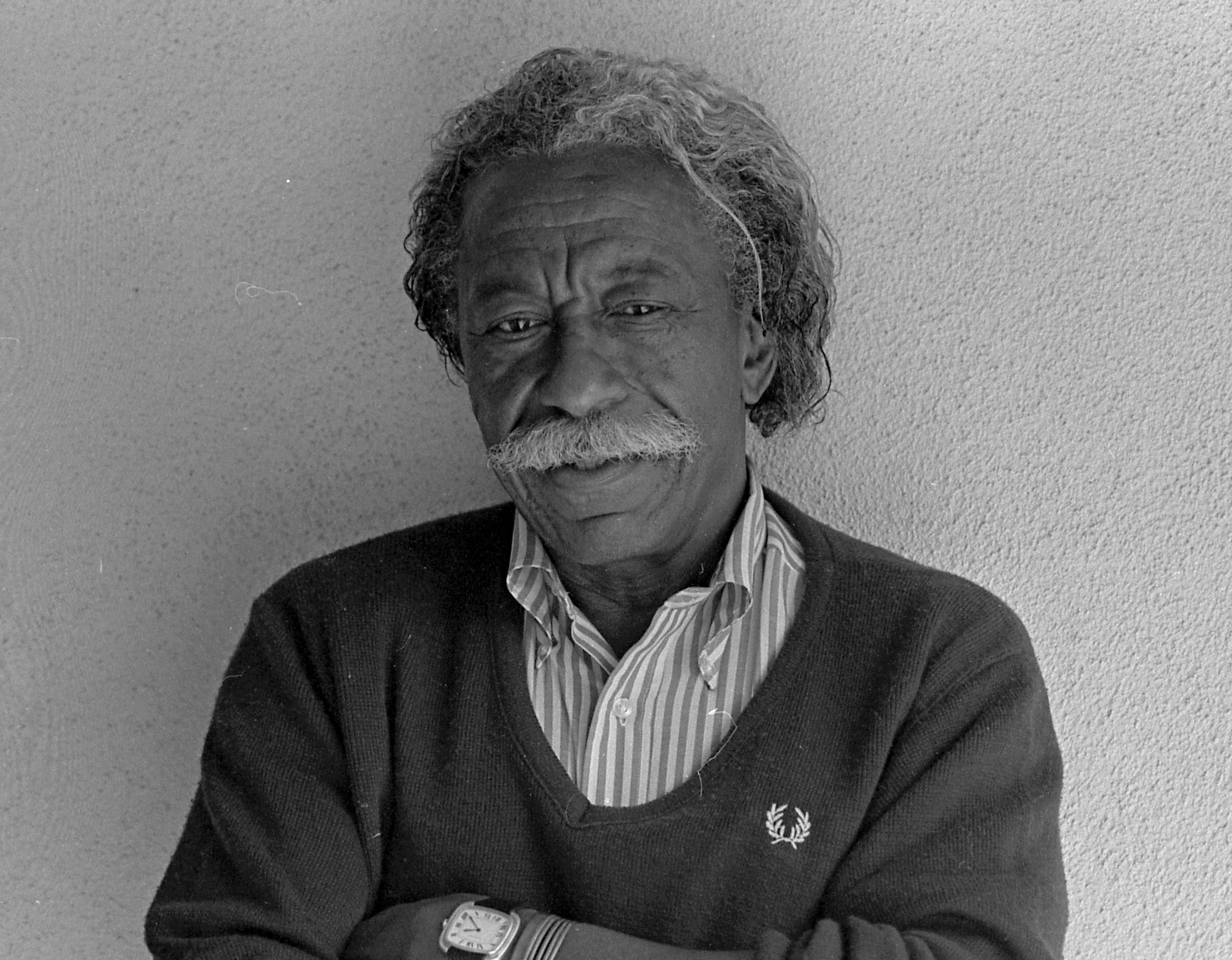
- Parks in 1984
- Born: Gordon Roger Alexander Buchanan Parks; November 30, 1912; Fort Scott, Kansas, U.S.
- Died: March 7, 2006 (aged 93); New York City, U.S.
- Works: Life photographic essays Shaft; The Learning Tree; Solomon Northup's Odyssey; A Choice of Weapons (memoir)
- Children: 4, including Gordon Parks Jr.
- Awards: NAACP Image Award (2003); PGA Oscar Micheaux Award (1993); National Medal of Arts (1988); Spingarn Medal (1972)

Gordon Roger Alexander Buchanan Parks (November 30, 1912 – March 7, 2006) was an American photographer, composer, author, poet, and filmmaker, who became prominent in U.S. documentary photojournalism in the 1940s through 1970s—particularly in issues of civil rights, poverty and African Americans—and in glamour photography. He is best remembered for his iconic photos of poor Americans during the 1940s (taken for a federal government project), for his photographic essays for Life magazine, and as the director of the films Shaft, Shaft's Big Score, and the semiautobiographical The Learning Tree.

Parks was one of the first black American filmmakers to direct films within the Hollywood system, developing films relating the experience of slaves and struggling black Americans, and helping create the "blaxploitation" genre. The National Film Registry cites The Learning Tree as "the first feature film by a black director to be financed by a major Hollywood studio."

== Early life ==
Parks was born in Fort Scott, Kansas, the son of Andrew Jackson Parks and Sarah Ross, on November 30, 1912. He was the youngest of 15 children. His father was a farmer who grew corn, beets, turnips, potatoes, collard greens, and tomatoes. They also had a few ducks, chickens, and hogs.

He attended a segregated elementary school. Because the town was too small for segregated high schools, his high school was integrated. However, black students were not allowed to participate in sports or school social activities, and they were discouraged from developing aspirations for higher education. Parks related in a documentary on his life that his teacher told him his desire to go to college would be a waste of money.

When Parks was 11 years old, three white boys threw him into the Marmaton River believing he couldn't swim. He had the presence of mind to duck underwater so they wouldn't see him make it to land. His mother died when he was fourteen. He spent his last night at the family home sleeping beside his mother's coffin seeking not only solace, but a way to face his own fear of death.

Soon after, he was sent to St. Paul, Minnesota to live with his sister and her husband. He and his brother-in-law argued frequently, and Parks was finally turned out onto the street to fend for himself at the age of 15. Struggling to survive, he worked in brothels, and as a singer, piano player, bus boy, traveling waiter, and semi-pro basketball player. In 1929, he briefly worked in an elite gentlemen's club, the Minnesota Club. There he observed the trappings of success and was able to read many books from the club library. When the Wall Street Crash of 1929 brought an end to the club, he jumped a train to Chicago, where he managed to land a job in a flophouse.

== Career ==
=== Photography ===
At the age of twenty-eight, Parks was struck by photographs of migrant workers in a magazine. He bought his first camera, a Voigtländer Brillant, for $12.50 at a Seattle, Washington pawnshop and taught himself how to take photos. The photography clerks who developed his first roll of film applauded his work and prompted him to seek a fashion assignment at a women's clothing store in St. Paul, Minnesota owned by Frank Murphy. Those photographs caught the eye of Marva Louis, wife of heavyweight boxing champion Joe Louis. She encouraged Parks and his wife, Sally Alvis, to move to Chicago in 1940, where he began a portrait business and specialized in photographs of society women. Parks's photographic work in Chicago, especially in capturing the myriad experiences of African Americans across the city, led him to receive the Julius Rosenwald Fellowship in 1942. The fellowship paid him $200 a month and offered him his choice of employer. This, in turn, contributed to being asked to join the Farm Security Administration (FSA) which was chronicling the nation's social conditions under the auspice of Roy Stryker.

Parks's commercial photography extended beyond fashion to include editorial assignments, portraits, and work documenting a wide range of subjects. His photographs appeared in publications including Glamour, Ebony, Vogue, and Life. His assignments often bridged commercial and documentary photography, allowing him to photograph subjects across different social environments and cultural contexts. His work in fashion photography included photographing designers and models in New York and Paris, while his photojournalistic work explored poverty, racial discrimination, and everyday life in the United States.

==== Government photography ====
Over the next few years, Parks moved from job to job developing a freelance portrait and fashion photographer sideline. He began to chronicle the city's South Side black ghetto, and in 1941, an exhibition of those photographs won Parks a photography fellowship with the FSA.

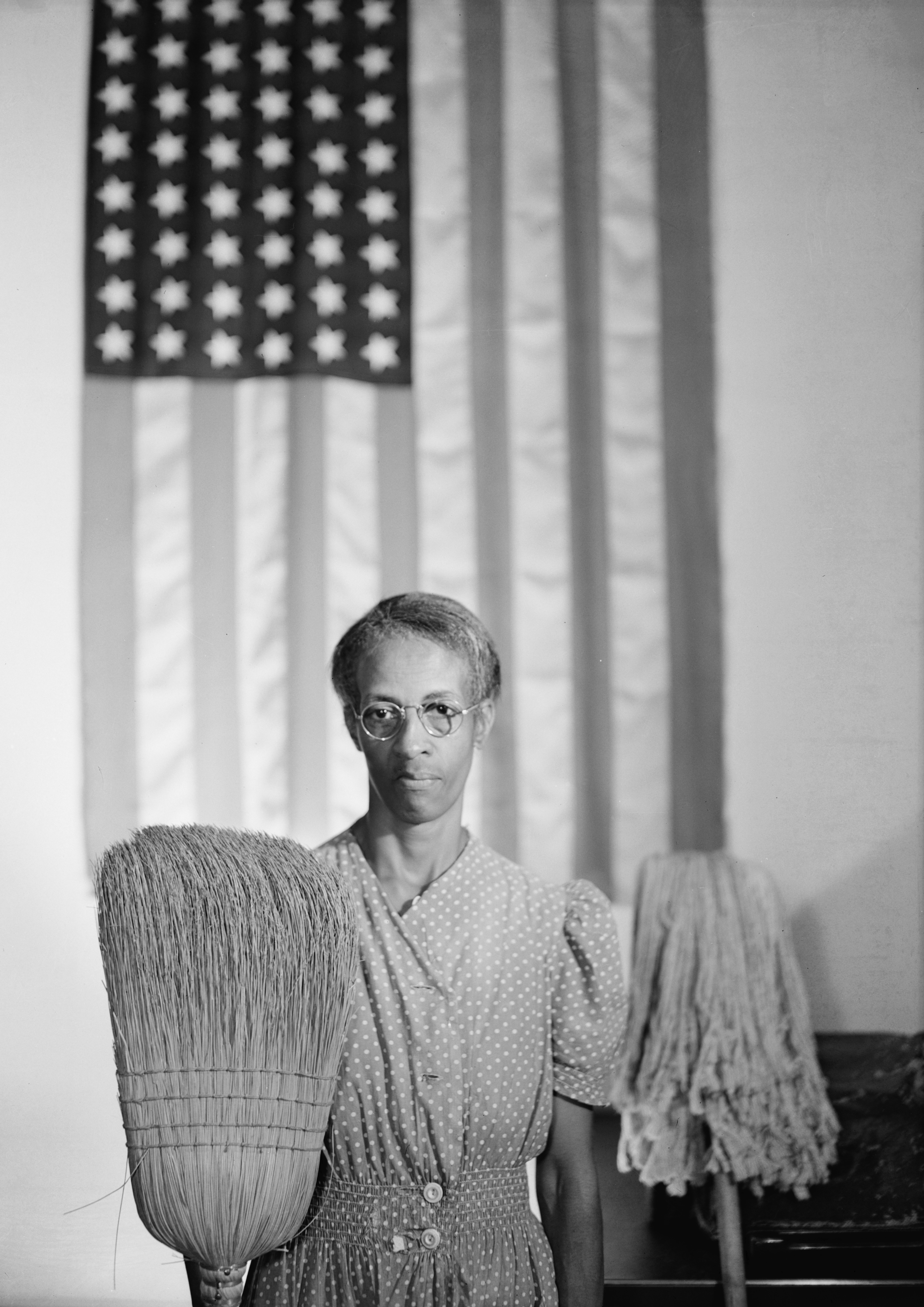
American Gothic, Washington, D.C. – a well-known photograph by Parks

Working at the FSA as a trainee under Roy Stryker, Parks created one of his best-known photographs, American Gothic, Washington, D.C. Inspired and named after the iconic Grant Wood painting American Gothic, Parks' "haunting" photograph shows Ella Watson, a black woman who worked on the cleaning crew of the FSA building, standing stiffly in front of an American flag—a broom in one hand and a mop in the background. Parks was inspired to create the image after encountering racism repeatedly in restaurants and shops in the segregated capital city.

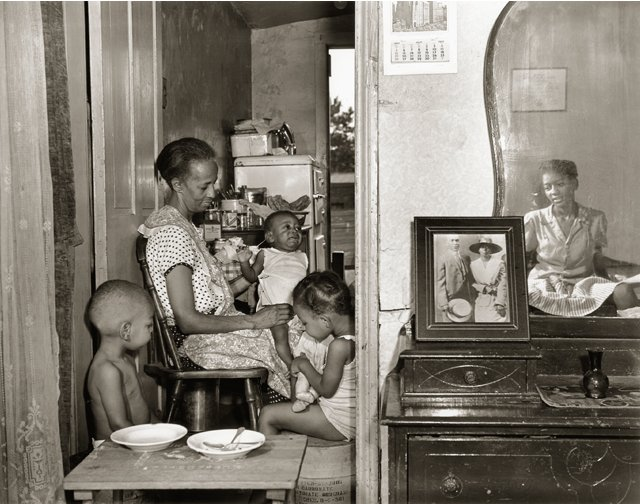
A later photograph in Parks' FSA series shows Ella Watson and her family.

Upon viewing the photograph, Stryker said that it was an indictment of America, and that it could get all of his photographers fired. He urged Parks to keep working with Watson which led to a series of photographs of her daily life. Parks said later that his first image was overdone and not subtle; other commentators have argued that it drew strength from its polemical nature and its duality of victim and survivor, and thus affected far more people than his subsequent pictures of Mrs. Watson.

(Parks's overall body of work for the federal government—using his camera "as a weapon"—would draw far more attention from contemporaries and historians than that of all other black photographers in federal service at the time. Today, most historians reviewing federally commissioned black photographers of that era focus almost exclusively on Parks.)

After the FSA disbanded, Parks remained in Washington, D.C. as a correspondent with the Office of War Information where he photographed the all-black 332d Fighter Group known as the Tuskegee Airmen. He was unable to follow the group in the overseas war theatre, so he resigned from the O.W.I. He would later follow Stryker to the Standard Oil Photography Project in New Jersey, which assigned photographers to take pictures of small towns and industrial centers. The most striking work by Parks during that period included: Dinner Time at Mr. Hercules Brown's Home, Somerville, Maine (1944); Grease Plant Worker, Pittsburgh, Pennsylvania (1946); Car Loaded with Furniture on Highway (1945); Self Portrait (1945); and Ferry Commuters, Staten Island, N.Y. (1946).

==== Commercial and civic photography ====
Parks renewed his search for photography jobs in the fashion world. Following his resignation from the Office of War Information, Parks moved to Harlem and became a freelance fashion photographer for Vogue under the editorship of Alexander Liberman. Despite racist attitudes of the day, Vogue editor Liberman hired him to shoot a collection of evening gowns. As Parks photographed fashion for Vogue over the next few years, he developed the distinctive style of photographing his models in motion rather than in static poses. During this time, he published his first two books, Flash Photography (1947) and Camera Portraits: Techniques and Principles of Documentary Portraiture (1948).

A 1948 photographic essay on a young Harlem gang leader won Parks a staff job as a photographer and writer with America's leading photo-magazine, Life. His involvement with Life would last until 1972. For over 20 years, Parks produced photographs on subjects including fashion, sports, Broadway, poverty, and racial segregation, as well as portraits of Malcolm X, Stokely Carmichael, Muhammad Ali, and Barbra Streisand. He became "one of the most provocative and celebrated photojournalists in the United States."

His photographs for Life magazine, namely his 1956 photo essay, titled "The Restraints: Open and Hidden," illuminated the effects of racial segregation while simultaneously following the everyday lives and activities of three families in and near Mobile, Alabama: the Thorntons, Causeys, and Tanners. As curators at the High Museum of Art Atlanta note, while the photo essay by Parks served as decisive documentation of the Jim Crow South and all of its effects, he did not simply focus on demonstrations, boycotts, and brutality that were associated with that period; instead, he "emphasized the prosaic details" of the lives of several families.

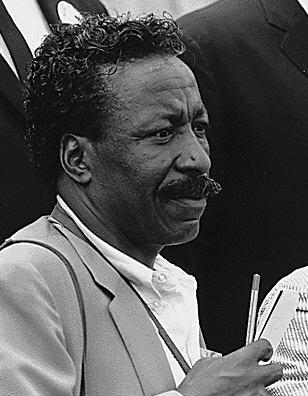
Parks at the Civil Rights March in Washington, 1963

An exhibition of photographs from a 1950 project Parks completed for Life was exhibited in 2015 at the Boston Museum of Fine Arts. Parks returned to his hometown, Fort Scott, Kansas, where segregation persisted, and he documented conditions in the community and the contemporary lives of many of his 11 classmates from the segregated middle school they attended. The project included his commentary, but the work was never published by Life.

During his years with Life, Parks also wrote a few books on the subject of photography (particularly documentary photography), and in 1960 was named Photographer of the Year by the American Society of Magazine Photographers.

His fashion photography continued to be published in Vogue from the mid-1940s to the late 1970s.

=== Film ===
In the 1950s, Parks worked as a consultant on various Hollywood productions. He later directed a series of documentaries on black ghetto life that were commissioned by National Educational Television. With his film adaptation of his semi-autobiographical novel, The Learning Tree, in 1969 for Warner Bros.-Seven Arts. It was filmed in his home town of Fort Scott, Kansas. Parks also wrote the screenplay and composed the musical score for the film, with assistance from his friend, the composer Henry Brant.

Shaft, a 1971 detective film directed by Parks and starring Richard Roundtree as John Shaft, became a major hit that spawned a series of films that would be labeled as blaxploitation. The blaxploitation genre was one in which images of lower-class blacks being involved with drugs, violence and women, were exploited for commercially successful films featuring black actors, and was popular with a section of the black community. Parks's feel for settings was confirmed by Shaft, with its portrayal of the super-cool leather-clad, black private detective hired to find the kidnapped daughter of a Harlem racketeer.

Parks also directed the 1972 sequel, Shaft's Big Score, in which the protagonist finds himself caught in the middle of rival gangs of racketeers. Parks's other directorial credits include The Super Cops (1974) and Leadbelly (1976), a biographical film of the blues musician Huddie Ledbetter. In the 1980s, he made several films for television and composed the music and a libretto for Martin, a ballet tribute to Martin Luther King Jr., which premiered in Washington, D.C., during 1989. It was screened on national television on King's birthday in 1990.

In 2000, as an homage, he had a cameo appearance in the Shaft sequel that starred Samuel L. Jackson in the title role as the namesake and nephew of the original John Shaft. In the cameo scene, Parks was sitting playing chess when Jackson greeted him as, "Mr. P."

=== Musician and composer ===
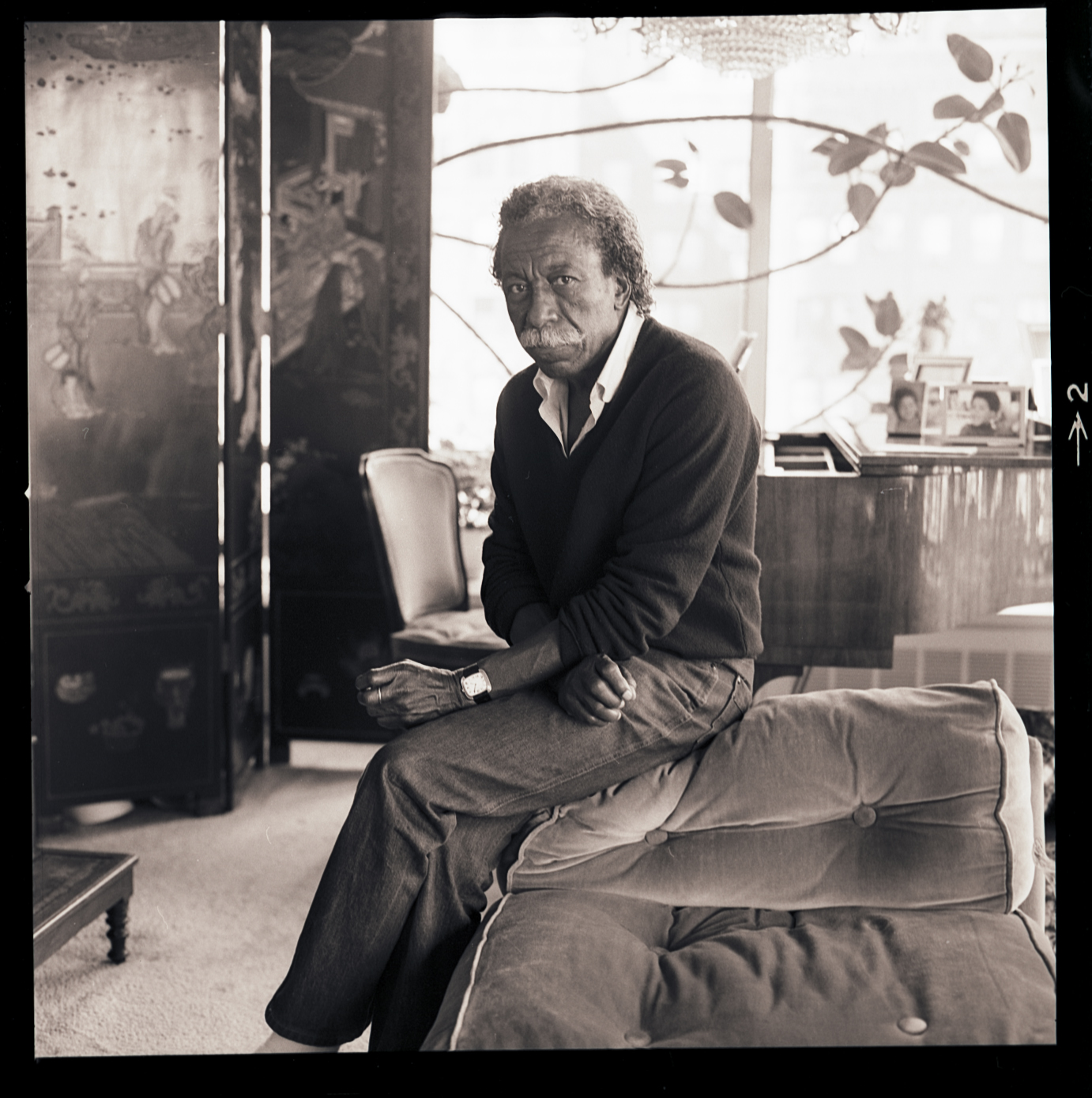
Gordon Parks next to his piano, photograph by David Finn (late 1980s)

His first job was as a piano player in a brothel when he was a teenager. Parks also performed as a jazz pianist. His song "No Love", composed in another brothel, was performed during a national radio broadcast by Larry Funk and his orchestra in the early 1930s.

Parks composed Concerto for Piano and Orchestra (1953) at the encouragement of black American conductor Dean Dixon and Dixon's wife Vivian, a pianist, and with the help of the composer Henry Brant. He completed Tree Symphony in 1967. In 1989, he composed and directed Martin, a ballet dedicated to Martin Luther King Jr., the civil-rights leader, who had been assassinated.

=== Writing ===
In the late-1940s, Parks began writing books on the art and craft of photography. This second career would produce 15 books and lead to his role as a prominent black filmmaker. His semi-autobiographical novel The Learning Tree was published in 1963. He authored several books of poetry, which he illustrated with his own photographs, and he wrote three volumes of memoirs: A Choice of Weapons (1966), Voices in the Mirror (1990), and A Hungry Heart (2005).

In 1981, Parks turned to fiction with Shannon, a novel about Irish immigrants fighting their way up the social ladder in turbulent early 20th-century New York. Parks's writing accomplishments include novels, poetry, autobiography, and non-fiction, including both photographic instructional manuals and books about filmmaking.

=== Painting ===
Parks's photography-related abstract oil paintings were showcased in a 1981 exhibition at Alex Rosenberg Gallery in New York titled "Gordon Parks: Expansions: The Aesthetic Blend of Painting and Photography."

=== Essence magazine ===
In 1970, Parks helped found Essence magazine, and served as its editorial director during the first three years of its circulation.

== Personal life ==
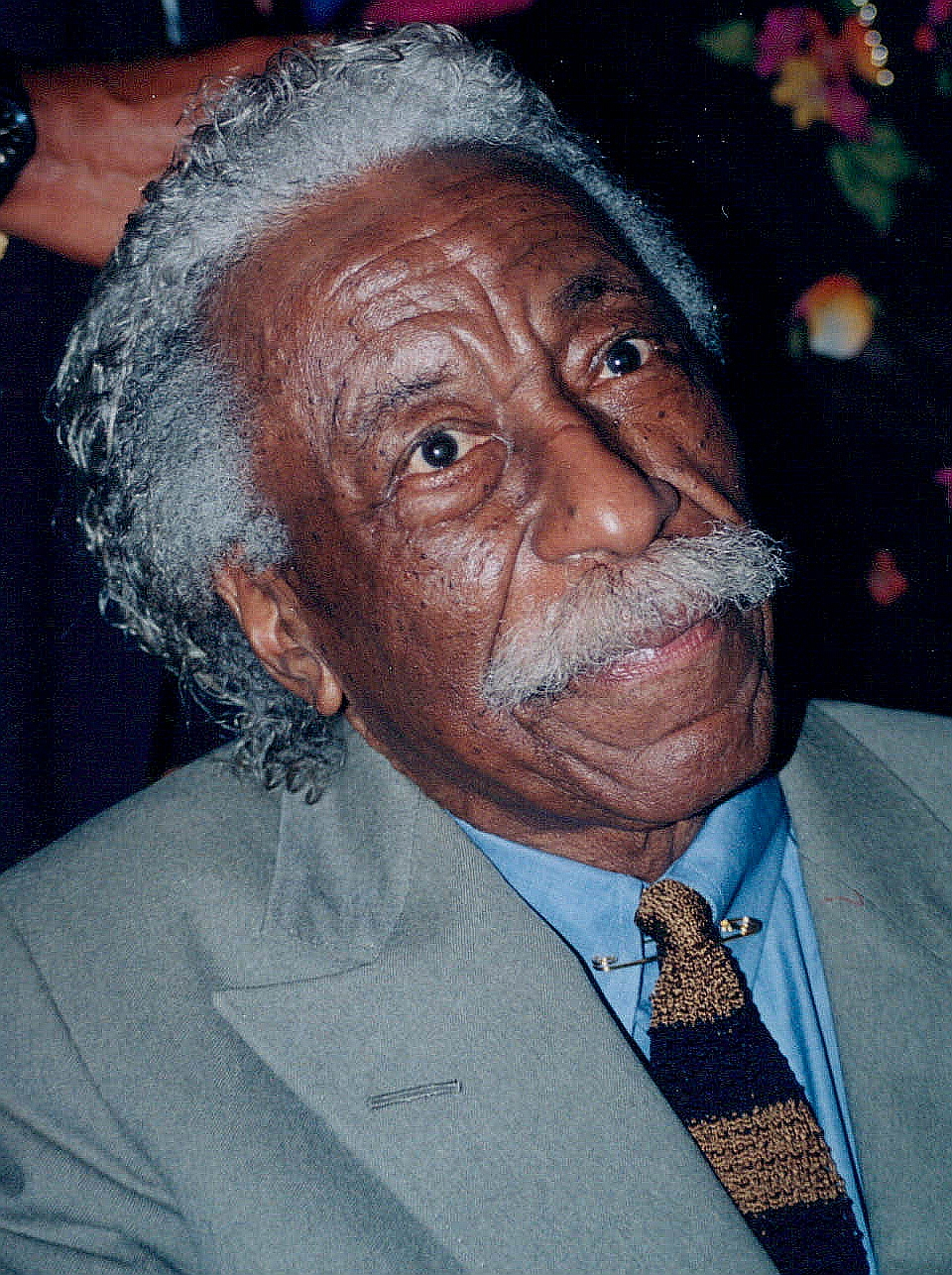
Parks in 2000

Parks was married and divorced three times. His first two wives, comprising almost 40 years of marriage, were Black. He married Sally Alvis in Minneapolis in 1933 and they divorced in 1961, after more than 25 years. In 1962, he married Elizabeth Campbell, daughter of cartoonist E. Simms Campbell, and they divorced in 1973. Parks first met Chinese-American editor Genevieve Young (stepdaughter of Chinese diplomat Wellington Koo) in 1962 when he began writing The Learning Tree. At that time, his publisher assigned her to be his editor. They became romantically involved at a time when they both were divorcing previous spouses, and married in 1973. This was his shortest marriage, lasting only six years. After their divorce in 1979, Parks and Young remained close friends until his death in 2006. Parks was in a long-term relationship with Gloria Vanderbilt until his death in 2006.

Parks had four children by his first two wives: Gordon, Jr., David, Leslie, and Toni (Parks-Parsons). His oldest son Gordon Parks, Jr., whose talents resembled his father's, was killed in a plane crash in 1979 in Kenya, where he had gone to direct a film. David is an author, with his first book, GI Diary, published in 1968. The book is included in the Howard University Press Classic Editions, Library of African American Literature and Criticism.

Parks was a longtime resident of Greenburgh, New York in Westchester County, New York, and his house was landmarked in 2007.

Parks has five grandchildren: Alain, Gordon III, Sarah, Campbell, and Satchel. Malcolm X honored Parks when he asked him to be the godfather of his daughter, Qubilah Shabazz.

== Legacy ==
=== In film ===
With his 1971 film Shaft (along with Melvin Van Peebles's Sweet Sweetback's Baadasssss Song, released earlier the same year), Parks co-created the genre of blaxploitation, an ethnic subgenre of the exploitation film that emerged in the United States during the early 1970s. The action film also helped to alter Hollywood's view of African Americans, introducing the black action hero into mainstream cinema.

Director Spike Lee cites Parks as an inspiration, stating "You get inspiration where it comes from. It doesn't have to be because I'm looking at his films. The odds that he got these films made under, when there were no black directors, is enough."

The Sesame Street character Gordon Robinson was named after Parks.

=== In music ===
- One of Parks' photographs, 1956 Alabama, is used for the album cover of Common's Like Water for Chocolate. It is a photo of a young black woman in Alabama, dressed for church, and drinking from a "colored only" drinking fountain.
- Parks is referenced in Kendrick Lamar's music video for his song "ELEMENT.". In the video, some of Parks's iconic photographs are transformed into moving vignettes.

== Preservation and archives ==
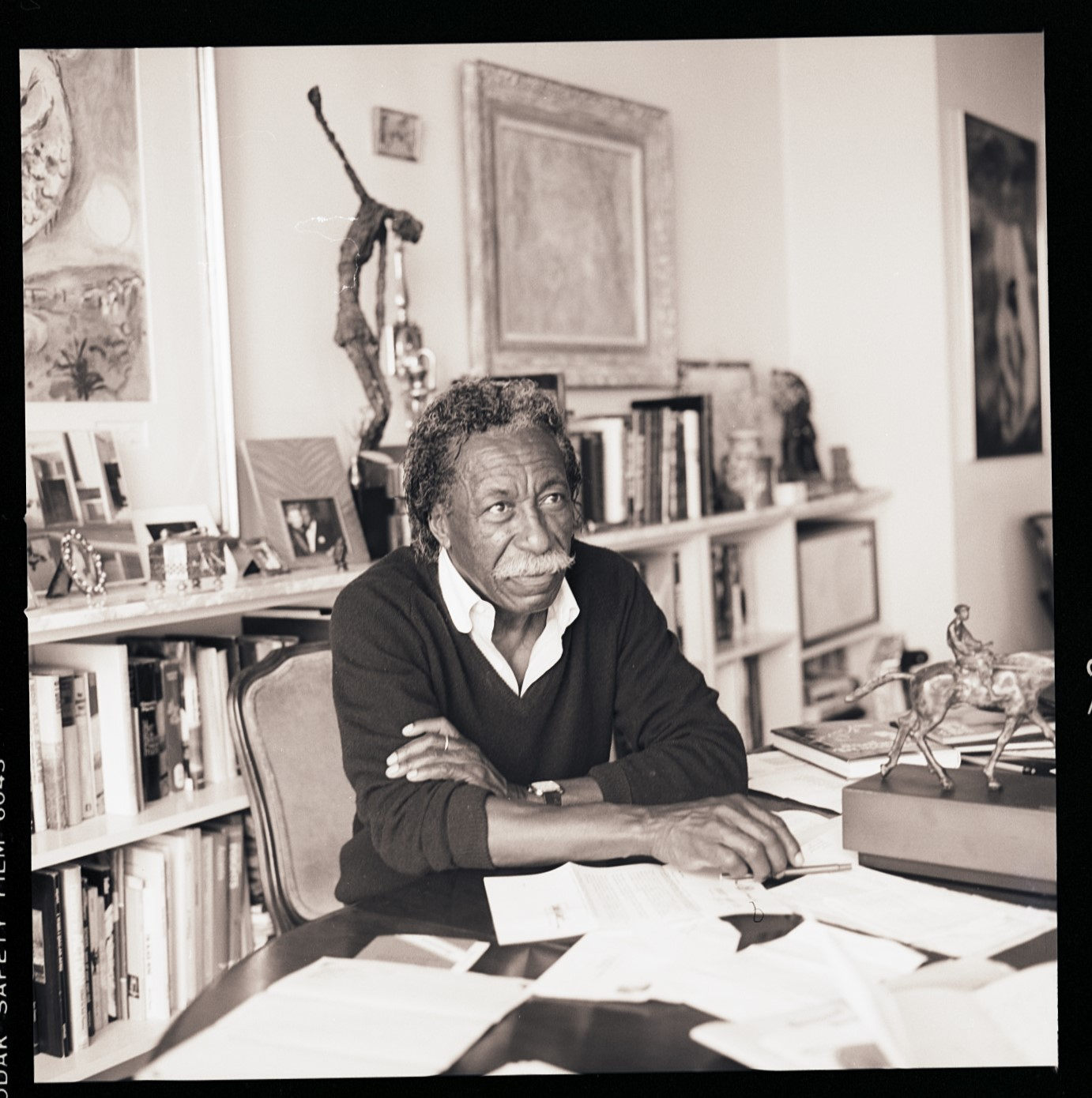
Gordon Parks in his study, photograph by David Finn (late 1980s)

Several parties are recipients or heirs of different parts of Parks's archival record.

The Gordon Parks Foundation

After his passing, Genevieve Young established the Gordon Parks Foundation in Pleasantville, New York (formerly in Chappaqua, New York) reports that it "permanently preserves the work of Gordon Parks, makes it available to the public through exhibitions, books, and electronic media." The organization also says it "supports artistic and educational activities that advance what Gordon described as 'the common search for a better life and a better world.'" That support includes scholarships for "artistic" students, and assistance to researchers. Their headquarters includes an exhibition space with rotating photography exhibits, open free to the public, with guided group tours available by arrangement. The foundation admits "qualified researchers" to their archive, by appointment. The foundation collaborates with other organizations and institutions, nationally and internationally, to advance its aims.

The Gordon Parks Museum/Center

The Gordon Parks Museum/Center in Fort Scott, Kansas, holds dozens of Parks's photos and various belongings, both given to the museum by Parks, and bequeathed to the museum by him upon his death. The collection includes "awards and medals, personal photos, paintings and drawings of Gordon, plaques, certificates, diplomas and honorary doctorates, selected books and articles, clothing, record player, tennis racket, magazine articles, his collection of Life magazines and much more." The museum has also separately received some of Parks's cameras, writing desk and photos of him.

Library of Congress, Washington, D.C.

The Library of Congress (LOC) reports that, in 1995, it "acquired Parks' personal collection, including papers, music, photographs, films, recordings, drawings and other products of his... career."

The LOC was already home to a federal archive that included Parks's first major photojournalism projects—photographs he produced for the Farm Security Administration (1942–43), and for the Office of War Information (1943–45).

In April 2000, the LOC awarded Parks its accolade "Living Legend", one of only 26 writers and artists so honored by the LOC. The LOC also holds Parks's published and unpublished scores, and several of his films and television productions.

National Film Registry

Parks's autobiographical motion picture, The Learning Tree, and his African-American anti-hero action-drama Shaft, are both permanently preserved as part of the National Film Registry of the Library of Congress. The Learning Tree was one of the original group of 25 films first selected by the LOC for the National Film Registry.

National Archives, Washington, D.C.

The National Archives hold the film My Father, Gordon Parks (1969: archive 306.8063), a film about Parks and his production of his autobiographical motion picture, The Learning Tree, along with a print (from the original) of Solomon Northup's Odyssey, a film made by Parks for a Public Broadcasting System telecast about the ordeal of a slave. The Archives also hold various photos from Parks's years in government service.

Smithsonian Institution, Washington, D.C.

The Smithsonian Institution has an extensive list of holdings related to Parks, particularly photos.

Wichita State University

In 1991, Wichita State University (WSU), in Wichita, the largest city in Parks's home state of Kansas, awarded him its highest honor for achievement: the President's Medal. However, in the mid-1990s, after Parks entrusted WSU with a collection of 150 of his famous photos, WSU—for various reasons (including confusion as to whether they were a gift or loan, and whether the university could adequately protect and preserve them)—returned them, stunning and deeply upsetting Parks. A further snub came from Wichita's city officials, who also declined the opportunity to acquire many of his papers and photos.

By 2000, however, WSU and Parks had healed their division. The university resumed honoring Parks and accumulating his work. In 2008, the Gordon Parks Foundation selected WSU as repository for 140 boxes of his photos, manuscripts, letters and other papers. In 2014, another 125 of his photos were acquired from the foundation by WSU, with help from Wichita philanthropists Paula and Barry Downing, for display at the university's Ulrich Museum of Art.

Kansas State University

The Gordon Parks Collection in the Richard L. D. and Marjorie J. Morse Department Special Collections at Kansas State University primarily documents the creation of his film The Learning Tree. The Marianna Kistler Beach Museum of Art at Kansas State University holds a collection of 204 Gordon Parks photographs as well as artist files and artwork documentation. This collection is made up of 128 photographs that were chosen and gifted by Parks in 1973 to K-State, after receiving an honorary doctor of letters degree from the university in 1970. The gift included black and white images printed from negatives made between 1949 and 1970 and stored in the LIFE magazine archives; the donation also included color photographs printed from negatives in the artist's private collection. The K-State gift is the first known set of photographs specifically selected by Parks for a public institution. The collection also includes a group of 73 photographs printed after two residences by Parks in Manhattan, Kansas. Parks first returned for a residency in 1984, sponsored by the local newspaper The Manhattan Mercury for its centennial; he returned for another in 1985, initiated by the Manhattan Arts Council and sponsored by the city and various community organizations and individuals. Seventy-three photographs printed after these visits were transferred from the Manhattan Arts Center to K-State in 2017. The photographs are of locations in and around Manhattan, including churches and historic homes and K-State architecture and students.

== Exhibitions ==
- 1984: The Photographs of Gordon Parks, Minnesota Museum of American Art, Landmark Center Galleries, St. Paul, Minnesota
- 1997: Half past autumn : a retrospective Gordon Parks, Corcoran Gallery of Art, Washington, D.C. A career retrospective.
- 2013: Gordon Parks: The Making of an Argument, New Orleans Museum of Art.
- 2015: Gordon Parks: Back to Fort Scott, Boston Museum of Fine Arts.
- 2015: Gordon Parks: Segregation Story, High Museum of Art, Atlanta.
- 2016: Invisible Man: Gordon Parks and Ralph Ellison in Harlem, Art Institute of Chicago, Chicago, Illinois.
- 2017: Gordon Parks: camera is my weapon, Zachęta Gallery, Warsaw, Poland.
- 2018: Gordon Parks: The Flavio Story, Ryerson Image Centre, Toronto, Ontario and the Getty Museum, Los Angeles.
- 2019: Gordon Parks: The New Tide, Early Work 1940-1950, organized by National Gallery of Art in collaboration with The Gordon Parks Foundation, traveled to the Cleveland Museum of Art, Amon Carter Museum of American Art, Fort Worth, Texas and Addison Gallery of American Art.
- 2020: Gordon Parks X Muhammad Ali, The Image of a Champion, 1966/1970, Nelson-Atkins Museum of Art, Kansas City, Missouri. Comprising photographs from two Life magazine assignments.
- 2020: A Choice of Weapons Honor and Dignity: The Visions of Gordon Parks and Jamel Shabazz, Minnesota Museum of American Art, St. Paul, Minnesota.
- 2021: "The Impact of Gordon Parks," multiple Parks films (including Leadbelly) screened and retrospective panel, Tallgrass Film Festival, Wichita, Kansas
- 2024-2025: Gordon Parks: Camera Portraits from the Corcoran Collection, the National Gallery of Art, Washington, D.C.
- 2026: Homeward to the Prairie I Come: Gordon Parks Photographs from the Beach Museum of Art, Brigham Young University Museum of Art, Provo, Utah.

== Collections ==
Work by Parks is held in the following public collections:

- Art Institute of Chicago, Chicago, Illinois
- Minneapolis Institute of Art, Minneapolis, Minnesota
- Cleveland Museum of Art
- Minnesota Museum of American Art, St. Paul, Minnesota
- Nelson-Atkins Museum of Art, Kansas City, Missouri
- Untitled, Harlem, New York. Pérez Art Museum Miami, Florida

== Awards and honors ==
- Parks received more than 20 honorary doctorates in his lifetime.
- 1941: Awarded a fellowship for photography from the Rosenwald Fund. The fellowship allowed him to work with the Farm Security Administration.
- 1961: Named "Magazine Photographer of the Year" (1960) by the American Society of Magazine Photographers.
- 1970: Kansas State University awarded Parks the honorary degree of Doctor of Letters.
- 1972: The NAACP awarded Parks the Spingarn Medal.
- 1973: Kansas State University hosted a week-long "Gordon Parks Festival", November 4–11.
- 1976: Honorary Doctor of Humanities degree from Thiel College, a private, liberal arts college in Greenville, Pennsylvania
- 1989: The United States Library of Congress selects The Learning Tree as one of the first 25 films chosen for permanent preservation as part of the National Film Registry, deeming it to be "culturally, historically, or aesthetically significant" in part due to its being the first film directed by an African American to be financed by a major Hollywood studio.
- 1990: Missouri Honor Medal for Distinguished Service in Journalism, Missouri School of Journalism, University of Missouri, Columbia, Missouri
- 1998: Anisfield-Wolf Book Award for Lifetime Achievement
- 1999: Gordon Parks Elementary School, a nonprofit, K-5 grade public charter school in Kansas City, Missouri, was established to educate the urban-core inhabitants.
- 2000: The Congress of Racial Equality Lifetime Achievement Award.
- 2000: Library of Congress selects Parks's film Shaft for National Film Registry preservation—deeming it to be "culturally, historically, or aesthetically significant"
- 2000 (April): Library of Congress awards Parks its accolade "Living Legend"—honoring "artists, writers, activists, filmmakers, physicians, entertainers, sports figures and public servants who have made significant contributions to America's diverse cultural, scientific and social heritage"—one 26 writers and artists so honored by the LOC.
- 2001: Kitty Carlisle Hart Award, Arts & Business Council, New York
- 2003: Royal Photographic Society's Special 150th Anniversary Medal and Honorary Fellowship (HonFRPS) in recognition of a sustained, significant contribution to the art of photography.
- 2002: Jackie Robinson Foundation Lifetime Achievement Award.
- 2002: Inducted into the International Photography Hall of Fame and Museum.
- 2004: The Art Institute of Boston awarded the honorary degree of Doctor of Humane Letters.
- 2008: An alternative learning center in Saint Paul, Minnesota, renamed their school Gordon Parks High School after receiving a new building
- 2021: The Gordon Parks Award for Black Excellence in Filmmaking, Tallgrass Film Festival, Wichita, Kansas, instituted in Parks' honor.

== Works ==
=== Books ===
- Flash Photography (1947)
- Camera Portraits: Techniques and Principles of Documentary Portraiture (1948) (documentary)
- The Learning Tree (1964) (semi-autobiographical)
- A Choice of Weapons (1967) (autobiographical)
- Born Black (1970) (compilation of essays and photographs)
- Flavio (1978)
- To Smile in Autumn (1979) (autobiographical)
  - New edition with foreword by Alexs D. Pate. Minneapolis: University of Minnesota Press, 2009
- Voices in the Mirror, New York: Doubleday (1990) (autobiographical)
- The Sun Stalker (2003) (biography on J. M. W. Turner)
- A Hungry Heart (2005) (autobiographical)
- Gordon Parks: Collected Works (2012), Göttingen, Germany: Steidl; Slp Edition, ISBN 978-3869305301
- The New Tide: Early Work 1940–1950 (2018), Göttingen, Germany: Steidl

=== Poetry ===
- Half Past Autumn: A Retrospective, memoir excerpts by Gordon Parks. Bulfinch Press/Little, Brown (1997), ISBN 0-8212-2298-8
- A Star for Noon – An Homage to Women in Images Poetry and Music Bulfinch. (2000), ISBN 978-0821226858
- Eyes With Winged Thoughts Atria Books (2005) ASIN B001EYHY00

=== Photography ===
- Arias of Silence (1994) Bulfinch Press, ISBN 978-0821221204
- Glimpses Towards Infinity. Bulfinch Press (1996), ISBN 978-0821222973
- A Harlem Family 1967. Göttingen, Germany: Steidl (2012), ISBN 978-3-86930-602-5
- Gordon Parks: a Poet and His Camera by Gordon Park, Viking Press (1968), ISBN 978-0233961088
- The Atmosphere of Crime, 1957. Göttingen, Germany: Steidl (2020), ISBN 978-3-95829-696-1

=== Films ===
- Flavio (1964) (short)
- The World of Piri Thomas (1968)
- The Learning Tree (1969)
- Shaft (1971)
- Shaft's Big Score! (1972)
- The Super Cops (1974)
- Leadbelly (1976)
- Solomon Northup's Odyssey (1984)
- Moments Without Proper Names (1987)

Parks also wrote Diary of a Harlem Family (1968) for Joseph Filipowic, and appeared in the 2000 remake of Shaft as Lenox Lounge Patron / Mr. P.

=== Music ===
- Shaft's Big Score (1972)
- Moments Without Proper Names (1987)
- Martin (1989) (ballet about Martin Luther King Jr.)

== Publications about Parks ==
- Peter W. Kunhardt, Jr., Philip Brookman (eds), Gordon Parks: The New Tide, Early Work 1940–1950. National Gallery of Art, Washington, D.C. and Steidl, 2018, ISBN 9783958294943
- Paul Roth and Amanda Maddox (eds),Gordon Parks: The Flavio Story. Gordon Parks Foundation and Steidl, 2017, ISBN 978-3-95829-344-1
- Michal Raz-Russo and Jean-Christophe Cloutier, et al., Invisible Man: Gordon Parks and Ralph Ellison. Art Institute of Chicago and Steidl, 2016, ISBN 978-3-95829-109-6
- Peter Kunhardt, Jr. and Felix Hoffmann (eds), I Am You: Selected Works, 1942–1978. C/O Berlin, Gordon Parks Foundation and Steidl, 2016, ISBN 978-3-95829-248-2
- Karen Haas, Gordon Parks: Back to Fort Scott. Steidl, 2015, ISBN 978-3-86930-918-7
- Brett Abbott, et al., Gordon Parks: Segregation Story. High Museum of Art, Atlanta and Steidl, 2014, ISBN 978-3-86930-801-2
- Russell Lord, Gordon Parks: The Making of an Argument. Steidl, 2013, ISBN 978-3-86930-721-3
- Peter Kunhardt, Jr. and Paul Roth (eds), Gordon Parks: Collected Works. Gordon Parks Foundation and Steidl, 2012, ISBN 978-3-86930-530-1
- Berry, S. L. Gordon Parks. New York: Chelsea House Publishers, 1990, ISBN 1-55546-604-4
- Bush, Martin H. The Photographs of Gordon Parks. Wichita, Kansas: Wichita State University, 1983.
- Donloe, Darlene. Gordon Parks: Photographer, Writer, Composer, Film Maker [Melrose Square Black American series]. Los Angeles: Melrose Square Publishing Company, 1993, ISBN 0-87067-595-8
- Harnan, Terry, and Russell Hoover. Gordon Parks: Black Photographer and Film Maker [Americans All series]. Champaign, Illinois: Garrard Publishing Company, 1972, ISBN 0-8116-4572-X
- Parr, Ann, and Gordon Parks. Gordon Parks: No Excuses. Gretna, Louisiana: Pelican Publishing Company, 2006. ISBN 1-58980-411-2
- Stange, Maren. Bare Witness: Photographs by Gordon Parks. Milan: Skira, 2006, ISBN 88-7624-802-1
- Turk, Midge, and Herbert Danska. Gordon Parks. New York: Thomas Y. Crowell Company, 1971, ISBN 0-690-33793-0

== Documentaries on or including Parks ==
- My Father, Gordon Parks (1969) (National Archives item #306.08063A)
- Soul in Cinema: Filming Shaft on Location (1971)
- Passion and Memory (1986)
- Malcolm X: Make It Plain (1994)
- All Power to the People (1996)
- Half Past Autumn: The Life and Works of Gordon Parks (2000)
- A Great Day in Hip-Hop (2000)
- BaadAsssss Cinema (2002)
- Soul Man: Isaac Hayes (2003)
- Unstoppable: Conversation with Melvin Van Peebles, Gordon Parks, and Ossie Davis (2005)
- Documenting the Face of America: Roy Stryker & the FSA Photographers (2008)
- A Choice of Weapons: Inspired by Gordon Parks (2021)

== See also ==
- List of photographers of the civil rights movement
