= Courtland Milloy =

American journalist

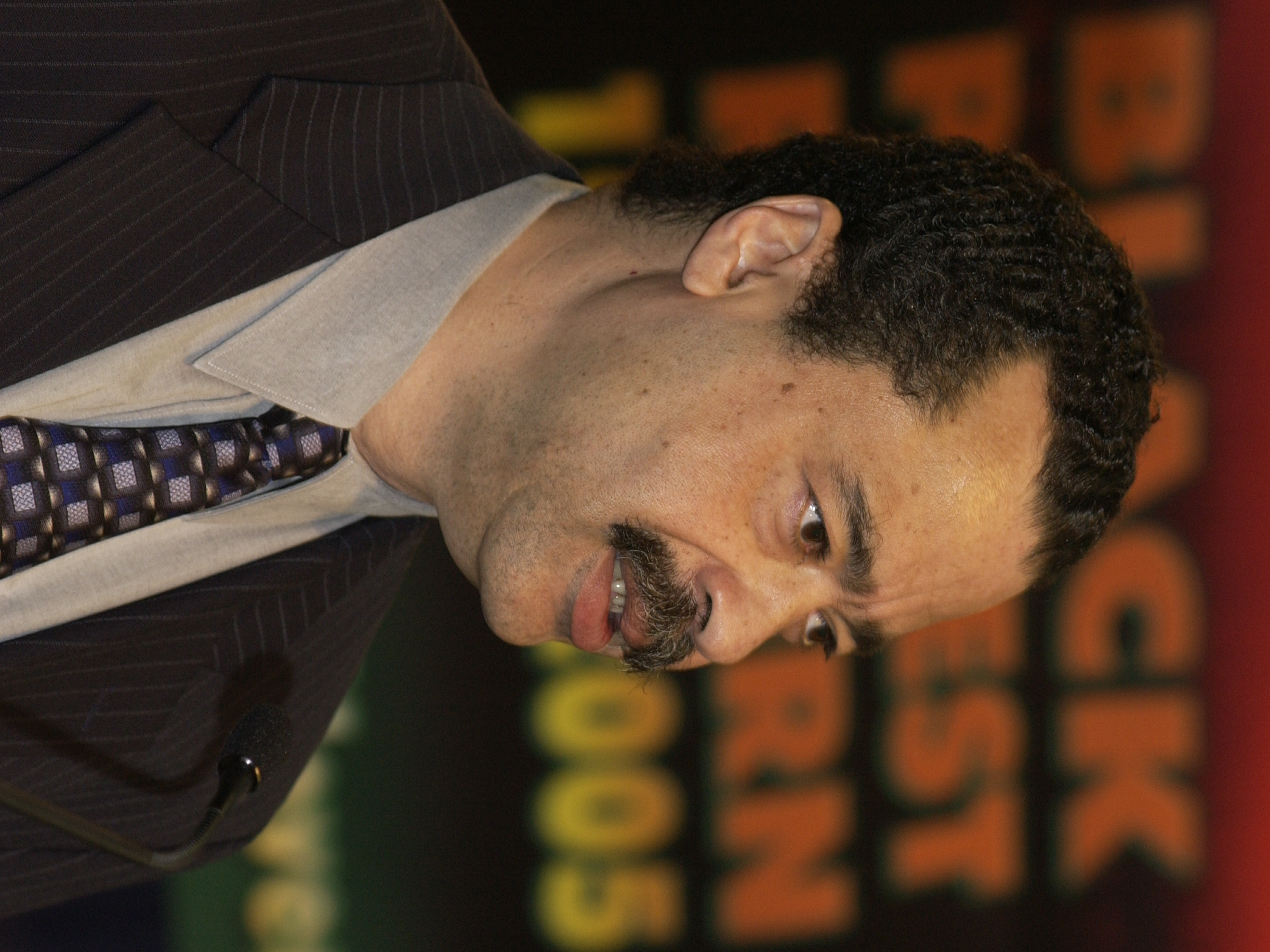
- Education: American
- Occupation: Journalist

Courtland Milloy is an American columnist and former reporter for The Washington Post. He joined the Post in 1975 after working at the Miami Herald. Milloy covers the Washington D.C. area's African-American community and highlighting issues in less affluent areas of Washington, D.C. He is a critic of gentrification and urban cyclists. Milloy hosted the BET show For Black Men Only in 1992. He is one of the journalists interviewed in the documentary film The Newspaperman.

A former critic of Twitter, he later began tweeting. Milloy has been critical of cyclists and has drawn their protests with his columns.

He was a critic of the Washington Redskins team name and has written on issues including panhandling, recovery from drug addiction, reparations, and traffic fines. In the aftermath of the September 11th attacks, Milloy wrote a column addressed as a letter to his son, trying to explain why the attacks had occurred.

On Dec. 19, 2023, Milloy published his farewell column.
