= John Maggio (director) =

American documentary director, writer and producer

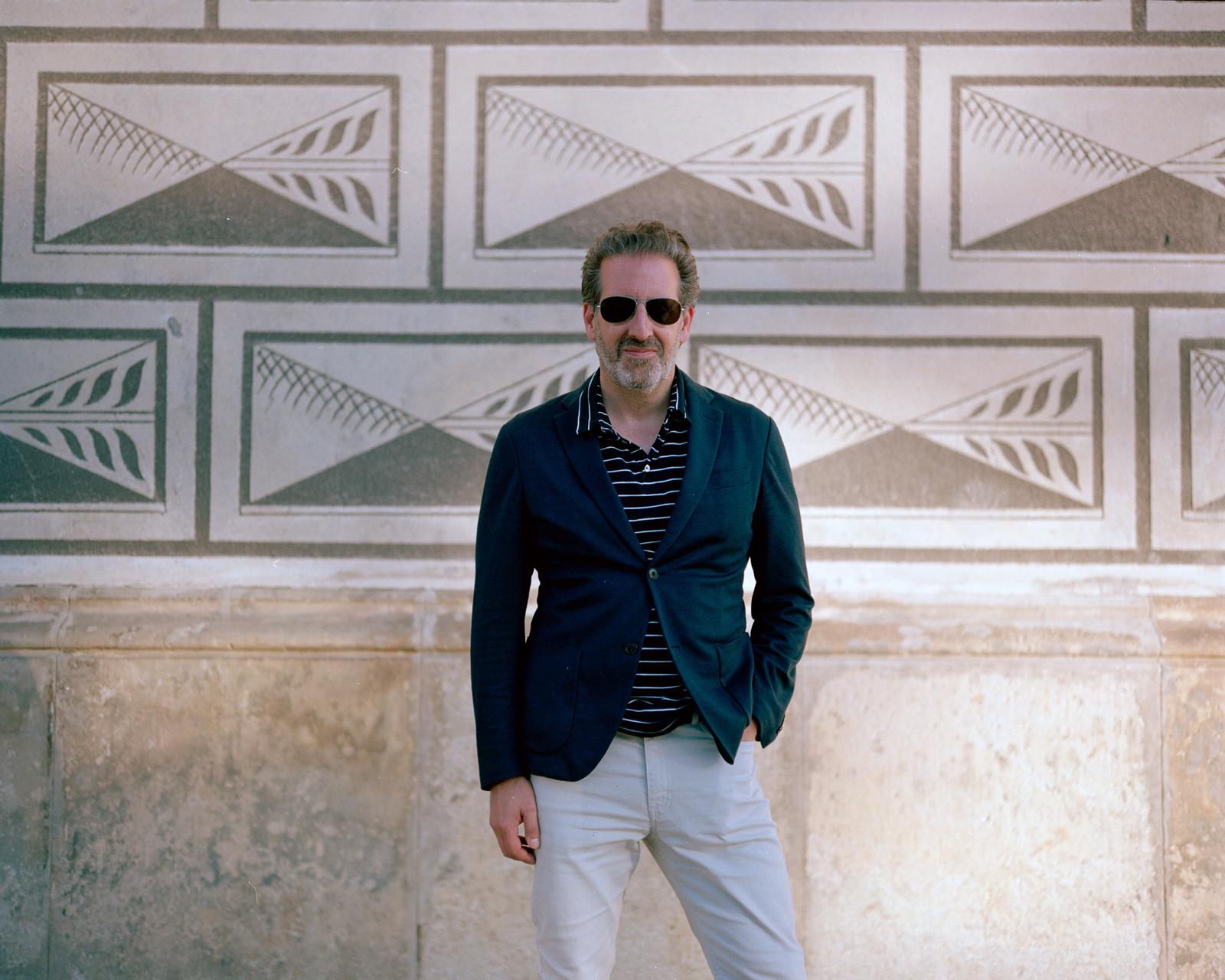
- Born: Buffalo, New York, U.S.
- Occupation(s): Director, writer, producer
- Years active: 2001–present

John Maggio is an American documentary film director, writer and producer. He is best known for his feature documentary films for HBO including The Perfect Weapon (HBO), Panic: The Untold Story of the 2008 Financial Crisis (HBO), The Newspaperman (HBO) and A Choice of Weapons: Inspired by Gordon Parks (HBO).

== Life and career ==
Maggio began his career as a musician as one of the founding members of the band, The Crosswalk with Cody ChesnuTT. Their debut album, Venus Loves A Melody was produced by Hollywood Records in 1999 with the legendary engineer Bob Clearmountain. After the band was dropped from their label Maggio pursued a career in documentary film and has been a partner at Brooklyn based film company Ark Media since 2003. In 2021, his film A Choice of Weapons: Inspired by Gordon Parks (HBO), had its world premiere at the Tribeca Film Festival. In 2023, his film Milano: The Inside Story of Italian Fashion had its premiere at the Milan Fashion Week. His latest film, Paul Anka: His Way, had its World Premiere at the Toronto International Film Festival in 2024 and was acquired by HBO. He is currently at work on a film documenting the immigration crisis in America.

== Filmography ==
| Year | Title | Contribution | Note |
|---|---|---|---|
| 2005-2018 | American Experience | Director, writer and producer | 7 Episodes |
| 2008-2016 | Frontline | Director, writer and Producer | 4 Episodes |
| 2017 | The Newspaperman | Director | Documentary |
| 2019 | Panic: The Untold Story of the 2008 Financial Crisis | Director and producer | Documentary |
| 2020 | The Perfect Weapon | Director and producer | Documentary |
| 2021 | A Choice of Weapons: Inspired by Gordon Parks | Director and producer | Documentary |
| 2021 | Music Box: Mr. Saturday Night | Director and producer | 1 Episode |
| 2022 | Year One: A Political Odyssey | Director and producer | Documentary |
| 2023 | Milano: The Inside Story of Italian Fashion | Director and producer | Documentary |
| 2024 | Paul Anka: His Way | Director and producer | Documentary |
| 2025 | Seen & Heard: The History of Black Television | Executive Producer | 2 Episodes |

== Awards and nominations ==
| Year | Result | Award | Category | Work | Ref. |
|---|---|---|---|---|---|
| 2001 | Nominated | Slamdance Film Festival | Grand Jury Prize | Virgil Bliss | |
| 2002 | Nominated | Independent Spirit Awards | John Cassavetes Award | Virgil Bliss | |
| 2007 | Nominated | News & Documentary Emmy Award | Outstanding Science, Technology and Nature Programming | American Experience - The Boy in the Bubble | |
| 2009 | Nominated | News & Documentary Emmy Award | Outstanding Informational Programming | Frontline - Growing Up Online | |
| 2010 | Nominated | Writers Guild of America Awards | Documentary Script – Current Events | Frontline - College, Inc. | |
| 2012 | Won | Writers Guild of America Awards | Outstanding Script for Breaking Report | Frontline - Educating Sergeant Pantzke | |
| 2018 | Won | News & Documentary Emmy Award | Outstanding Business and Economic Documentary | Panic: The Untold Story of the 2008 Financial Crisis | |
| 2018 | Nominated | Producers Guild of America Award | Outstanding Producer of Documentary Motion Pictures | The Newspaperman | |
| 2018 | Nominated | Writers Guild of America Awards | Documentary Script – Other Than Current Events | American Experience - Into The Amazon | |
| 2020 | Nominated | Writers Guild of America Awards | Documentary Script – Other Than Current Events | American Experience - The Poison Squad | |
| 2021 | Nominated | News and Documentary Emmy Awards | Outstanding Politics and Government Documentary | The Perfect Weapon | |
| 2022 | Nominated | News and Documentary Emmy Awards | Best Documentary | A Choice of Weapons: Inspired by Gordon Parks | |
| 2022 | Nominated | News and Documentary Emmy Awards | Outstanding Arts and Culture Documentary | A Choice of Weapons: Inspired by Gordon Parks | |
| 2022 | Nominated | News and Documentary Emmy Awards | Best Editing | A Choice of Weapons: Inspired by Gordon Parks | |
