= James Jones (documentary maker) =

British director (born 1982)

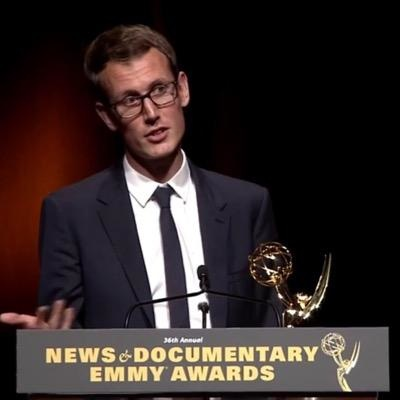
Jones receiving a News and Documentary Emmy in New York in September 2015

James Jones (born December, 1982) is a British director known for making documentary films on social issues for international television and theatrical release.

== Career ==
James Jones' films have been broadcast on the BBC, Channel 4, Sky, HBO, Apple TV+ and PBS Frontline.

Jones has tackled subjects including suicide in the military and homelessness. He has also made films in North Korea and Saudi Arabia. His film Children of the Gaza War was broadcast on the BBC in July 2015 on the first anniversary of the 2014 Gaza war. In 2016 he made a feature-length documentary Unarmed Black Male about the murder trial of a police officer in Portsmouth, Virginia. In 2017 he co-directed Mosul with Olivier Sarbil.

In 2019, he released a feature documentary on the drug war in the Philippines, On the President's Orders, for PBS's Frontline, Arte France, BBC's Storyville and Bertha Doc Society, in which he follows a newly installed police chief of Caloocan City who is a supporter of president Rodrigo Duterte's anti-drug campaign. It played at the Sheffield DocFest and Human Rights Watch Film Festival in New York.

In 2022, his film Chernobyl: The Lost Tapes was broadcast on Sky Documentaries. It told the story of the Chernobyl disaster using personal interviews with people who were there and newly discovered, dramatic footage filmed at the nuclear plant. The film was nominated for a BAFTA for Best Documentary and won a BAFTA for Best Editing.

In 2023, his series Wanted: The Escape of Carlos Ghosn was released on Apple TV+.

== Filmography ==
Year	Title	Awards and Nominations	Notes
2010	Secret Iraq	BAFTA for Best Current Affairs (nominated)	
2011	Sex, Lies and Black Magic		
2011	Landlords from Hell		
2011	Vlad's Army		
2012	Interviews Before Execution		
2013	Britain's Hidden Housing Crisis	BAFTA for Best Current Affairs (nominated)	
2013	Broken by Battle		
2013	North Korea: Life Inside the Secret State	BAFTA for Best Current Affairs (nominated)	Alternatively titled Secret State of North Korea
2014	Syria's Second Front		
2014	Battle for Ukraine		
2015	Children of the Gaza War	BAFTA for Best Current Affairs (nominated)	
2016	Saudi Arabia Uncovered		
2016	Unarmed Black Male	BAFTA for Best Current Affairs (nominated)	
2017	Mosul		As co-director and writer only
2019	On the President's Orders	Emmy Award for Outstanding Current Affairs Documentary (nominated)	Also producer
2022	Chernobyl: The Lost Tapes		Also producer
2023	Wanted: The Escape of Carlos Ghosn		Television series
2024	Antidote		Also producer
2026	Fukushima: A Nuclear Nightmare		Also executive producer
