= Antidote (2024 film) =

Documentary film by James Jones

- Release poster
- Directed by: James Jones
- Produced by: James Jones; David Moulton
- Cinematography: Edgar Dubrovskiy; Jean-Louis Schuller
- Edited by: Rupert Houseman
- Music by: Uno Helmersson
- Production companies: Impact Partners; Channel 4; Passion Pictures; Bellingcat
- Distributed by: Frontline
- Release dates: June 7, 2024 (Tribeca); May 6, 2025 (United States)
- Running time: 89 minutes
- Countries: United States; United Kingdom
- Language: English

Antidote is a 2024 documentary film, directed and produced by James Jones. It follows three individual whistleblowers and activists who face grave consequences for their efforts exposing Vladimir Putin's regime.

Antidote had its world premiere at Tribeca Festival on June 7, 2024. It was released in the United States on Frontline on May 6, 2025.

== Premise ==
Explores three individual whistleblowers and activists Christo Grozev, Vladimir Kara-Murza, and an unnamed scientist, who face grave consequences for their efforts exposing Vladimir Putin's regime.

== Production ==
Due to the sensitive nature of the project, the filmmakers kept the project secret, communicated using encrypted apps and worked in a bunker inside an office only they could access, and kept the post-production process offline. The unnamed scientist in the film was digitally altered to protect his identity.

== Release ==
It had its world premiere at Tribeca Festival on June 7, 2024. It also screened at DC/DOX Film Festival on June 15, 2024. In April 2025, Frontline acquired US distribution rights to the film, setting a May 6, 2025, release.

Following the release on PBS of Antidote on May 6, 2025, the interview of James Jones and Christo Grozev by Christiane Amanpour aired on PBS's Amanpour & Company on May 9, 2025.

== Reception ==
On review aggregator website Rotten Tomatoes, the film holds an approval rating of 91% based on 11 reviews, with an average rating of 7.8/10.

== See also ==
- Jan Marsalek
