= A Choice of Weapons: Inspired by Gordon Parks =

2021 documentary film

- Official poster
- Directed by: John Maggio
- Produced by: John Maggio; Monica Berra; Richard Lowe; Teddy Kunhardt; George Kunhardt; Matthew Henderson
- Cinematography: Joe Arcidiacono; Clair Popkin
- Edited by: Richard Lowe
- Music by: Gary Lionelli
- Production companies: HBO Documentary Films; Ark Media
- Distributed by: HBO
- Release date: June 18, 2021 (Tribeca)
- Running time: 89 minutes
- Country: United States
- Language: English

A Choice of Weapons: Inspired by Gordon Parks is a 2021 documentary film that follows the life of the photographer and filmmaker Gordon Parks. Its title derives from Parks’ 1967 autobiography. The film features Devin Allen, Jelani Cobb, Anderson Cooper, Ava DuVernay, Nelson George, Jamel Shabazz, Spike Lee, and LaToya Ruby Frazier.

It was directed and produced by John Maggio for HBO Documentary Films; Alicia Keys and Swizz Beatz served as executive producers. The film had its world premiere at the Tribeca Film Festival on June 18, 2021.

At the 43rd News and Documentary Emmy Awards the project received three nominations, including Best Documentary and Outstanding Arts and Culture Documentary.

== Reception ==
On review aggregator website Rotten Tomatoes, the film has an approval rating of 88% based on 7 critics, with an average rating of 7.3/10.

Matt Fagerholm of RogerEbert.com gave the documentary four stars and called it "deeply moving". Chris Barsanti of Slant Magazine gave it 3 stars out of 4 and called the film "[a] workmanlike in presentation but scintillating in its content".
