= HBO Films =

Filmed entertainment arm of HBO

- Formerly: HBO Premiere Films (1983–1986); HBO Film Licensing Inc. (1983–1984); HBO Pictures (1984–1999)
- Type: Division
- Industry: Film, cable television
- Founded: 1983; 43 years ago in New York, New York, United States
- Founder: Robert S. Halligan Jr. Nancy Parent; Eugene F. Van Buren
- Headquarters: Los Angeles, United States
- Key people: Len Amato (president)
- Parent: Home Box Office, Inc.
- Website: hbo.com/movies

HBO Films (formerly called HBO Premiere Films and HBO Pictures) is an American production and distribution company founded in 1983 as a division of the cable television network HBO that produces feature films and miniseries. The division produces fiction and non-fiction works under HBO Documentary Films, primarily for distribution to their own customers, though recently the company has been funding theatrical releases.

HBO Films slates three or four films per year and develops most of them internally with theatrical films being distributed by Warner Bros. Pictures.

== Background ==
After or around 1978, HBO was involved into preproduction financing films for exclusive pay-television rights, which was risky as the films could be unpopular while alienating movie studios. The original Silver Screen Partners, L.P. was organized by Roland W. Betts, New York film investment broker to fund movies for HBO in 1982. The limited partnership sold through EF Hutton were oversubscribed and raised $83 million. HBO made a 50% guarantee on their investment for exclusive cable rights. HBO then joined with Columbia Pictures and CBS to form TriStar Pictures, which was expected to become a major film studio, in 1983. HBO sold half of its ownership in TriStar in December 1985.

== History ==
=== Origin, as a television film production arm ===
HBO Premiere Films began in 1983 as a telefilm and miniseries production company with an "ambitious production schedule" for the HBO channel. With the high expense of theatrical film exclusive, those films appeared on multiple pay television channels. Thus, the unit was started to give the channel some exclusives. The company's first head, Jane Deknatel (an English-born television veteran), projected the unit would do 24 projects in 1984 and 50 a few years later. HBO Premiere Films was funding the productions at 60% for just the pay television rights. Their first film, The Terry Fox Story, shown in May 1983 was also the first feature film produced expressly for pay television. Two more films were produced and shown in 1983.

Beyond television movies, the company set up a new subsidiary HBO Film Licensing Inc. in February 1983, which was to produce theatrical feature films in collaboration with Silver Screen Partners. In November 1983, the venture signed distribution deal with Tri-Star Pictures for theatrical film distribution, and Thorn EMI Screen Entertainment for all media except English-language cable.

By the end of the first year the schedule was cut back and the unit moved into producing theatrical films. In January 1984, Donald March took over the company from Deknatel as senior vice president. He canceled a dozen projects in development and was reassessing star vehicle productions as being done as vanity projects. A production for each month from July to November was the new plan with a push for additional rights beyond pay television rights, like foreign theatrical, home video and network television. In January 1984, a telefilm and HBO Premiere Films' first two mini-series, All the Rivers Run then Far Pavilions were cablecast. In 1984, HBO decided to brand its theatrical films with the Silver Screen Partners joint venture as HBO Pictures from the former HBO Film Licensing name. In 1986, HBO Premiere Films changed its name to HBO Pictures in an effort to increase the number of original films. HBO Pictures started winning Emmy Awards in 1993 with two for Barbarians at the Gate and Stalin. During this time, HBO was also invested in the film Three Amigos! for Orion Pictures.

After the end of the partnership between HBO and Silver Screen Partners, HBO invested in funding productions jointly financed by Taft Entertainment Pictures and Keith Barish Productions, with HBO controlling pay television rights, 20th Century Fox intending to distribute, and Producers Sales Organization handled international sales, and Vestron Video handling home video rights to its titles, but in 1986, Fox's duties was later taken over by Tri-Star Pictures, and PSO later shuttered down with J&M Entertainment taking over international sales.

In 1987, HBO was an investor and financer in the film company led by Aaron Russo, Aaron Russo Entertainment, which had contracts with others like Vestron Video (which its duties later transferred to HBO itself in 1988), the Rank Organization for foreign film rights, Orion Pictures for theatrical distribution in North America (Canadian distribution later transferred to Cineplex Odeon Films) and the network holding cable and syndication rights (syndication rights transferred to Viacom).

Also in 1987, the company signed a feature agreement with Mercury/Douglas Films where HBO financed and distributed many of the budgets across $12 million, with a distribution deal with MGM to give the right to acquire the theatrical and nontheatrical distribution rights of many of the films.

Around the time, the company tried its hand into theatrical feature films again in early 1988 by partnering with Cinema Plus L.P. via its new film subsidiary HBO Film Management Inc., with MGM/UA Communications planning on to distribute its films, but in 1990, MGM/UA transferred distribution of the planned films to Warner Bros. due to the Time Inc.-Warner Communications merger. In late 1990, international sales of the films was picked up by the upstart company The Summit Group. In 1991, UK rights to the films were picked up by First Independent Films.

Around November 1996, John Matoian was appointed as president of HBO Pictures reporting to HBO chairman and CEO Jeff Bewkes. Bewkes decided by April 1999 that he want a single original programming division. Programming president Chris Albrecht oversaw original series development, specials and miniseries and was selected over Matoian. Matoian resigned because he lost his direct reporting status and would have reported to Albrecht. Executive vice president of HBO NYC Colin Callender, who reported to Matoian, was promoted to take over as president of HBO Pictures.

=== HBO Films ===
In October 1999, HBO NYC Productions was merged into HBO Pictures and renamed HBO Films under division president Callender. HBO Films Development Unit was also formed by November 1999.

Prior to July 2003, HBO Films made individual distribution deal for their films. The company formed its theatrical distribution division, HBO Films Domestic Theatrical Releasing, that month with a distribution label partnership pact with Fine Line Features and the hiring of Dennis O’Connor, United Artists marketing vice-president, as division head. The pact negotiation was started due to a single distribution film deal between Fine Line and HBO Films for American Splendor. HBO Films Domestic Theatrical Releasing's first release was Elephant on October 24, 2003. In 2005, HBO Films Domestic Theatrical Releasing and Fine Line were effectively merged with Warner Bros. decided HBO and New Line Cinema should form a new smaller and niche films distribution arm, Picturehouse.

Len Amato, producer and as the president of Spring Creek Productions, was appointed HBO Films senior vice president in March 2007. In 2008, Picturehouse was discontinued with distribution being handled by Warner Bros.' main distribution arm. HBO Films exited the theatrical film market with Picturehouse's closure. With Callender leaving to form his own production company in late 2008, no division president is appointed with department heads becoming president of their departments, Kary Antholis at HBO Miniseries, and Amato at HBO Films. Both answered to president of programming group/West Coast operations, Michael Lombardo.

== Top audiences ==
Movie	Date Released	Gross viewers (millions)
Behind the Candelabra	May 26, 2013	11.45
Taking Chance	February 21, 2009	10.45
Lackawanna Blues	February 12, 2005	10.14
Game Change	March 10, 2012	10.04
Something the Lord Made	May 30, 2004	9.75
The Wizard of Lies	May 20, 2017	8.93
Bury My Heart at Wounded Knee	May 27, 2007	8.00
Temple Grandin	February 6, 2010	7.80
Iron Jawed Angels	February 15, 2004	7.80
Grey Gardens	April 18, 2009	7.45

== Reception ==
The films produced by the company have garnered hundreds of Primetime Emmy Awards, 694 nominations with 162 wins, and Golden Globe Awards. HBO Films productions have won the Primetime Emmy Award for Outstanding Television Movie every year from 1993 to 2015 and 2020, except for four years. Elephant is the first film produced by HBO Films to win the Palme d'Or at the Cannes Film Festival.

== HBO NYC Productions ==
HBO Showcase was started as a second film banner for HBO in 1985 to expand the boundary of drama for 1986. The banner originally had a year suffix at the end of the label (e.g. "HBO Showcase '86"), before it was dropped in 1988. In 1987, Colin Callendar was hired as an executive producer for the company. Age Old Friends (1989) was the unit's first production to earn an Emmy Award. In 1996, HBO Showcase was expanded and given a new name HBO NYC Productions, reflecting the company's headquarters in New York City.

In April 1999, Colin Callender, executive VP of HBO NYC, was promoted to be HBO Pictures president. In October 1999, HBO NYC Productions was merged into HBO Pictures and renamed HBO Films under division president Callender.

In 2002, Keri Putnam was named the Executive Vice President of Movies and Mini-series at HBO Films before moving to Miramax Films in 2006.

== See also ==
- List of HBO Documentary Films films
- List of HBO original programming
- List of HBO Max original films
