= The Newspaperman =

The Newspaperman: The Life and Times of Ben Bradlee
- Directed by: John Maggio
- Produced by: Sheila Nevins; Richard Cohen; Jacqueline Glover; Peter W. Kunhardt; George Kunhardt; Teddy Kunhardt
- Starring: Carl Bernstein; Tom Brokaw; Henry Kissinger; Jim Lehrer; Sally Quinn; Bob Woodward
- Cinematography: Clair Popkin
- Edited by: Seth Bomse
- Music by: Gary Lionelli
- Production company: Kunhardt Films
- Distributed by: HBO
- Release date: December 4, 2017
- Running time: 89 minutes
- Country: United States
- Language: English

The Newspaperman: The Life and Times of Ben Bradlee is an American documentary film that premiered on December 4, 2017 on HBO. Directed by John Maggio, the film explores the life and legacy of journalist Ben Bradlee.

== Premise ==
The Newspaperman: The Life and Times of Ben Bradlee is "an intimate portrait of Bradlee that traces his ascent from a young Boston boy stricken with polio to one of the most consequential journalistic figures of the 20th century."

== Persons featured ==
The documentary includes interviews with:

- Bob Woodward
- Carl Bernstein
- Quinn Bradlee
- Courtland Milloy
- David Maraniss
- David Remnick
- Don Graham
- George Vaillant
- Henry Kissinger
- Ben Bradlee Jr.
- Jim Hoagland
- Jim Lehrer
- John Dean
- Norman Lear
- Richard Cohen
- Robert Kaiser
- Robert Redford
- Sally Bedell Smith
- Sally Quinn
- Tina Brown
- Tom Brokaw

== Release ==
=== Marketing ===
On November 13, 2017, HBO released the first trailer for the film.

=== Premiere ===
On November 29, 2017, the film held its New York premiere at the HBO Screening Room in New York City.

== Reception ==
=== Critical reception ===
The Newspaperman: The Life and Times of Ben Bradlee has been met with a positive response from critics. On the review aggregation website Rotten Tomatoes, the film holds a 94% approval rating with an average rating of 7.8 out of 10, based on 16 reviews. Metacritic, which uses a weighted average, assigned the film a score of 80 out of 100 based on 7 critics, indicating "generally favorable reviews".

In a positive review, The Hollywood Reporter's Frank Scheck said, "Chronicling its subject's life and career in fascinating detail, The Newspaperman: The Life and Times of Ben Bradlee will prove catnip to journalism and political buffs, not to mention anyone who cares about the free press and its role in our democracy." Similarly complimentary, The Wall Street Journal's Dorothy Rabinowitz said, "As any rational person would expect, the subject of HBO’s The Newspaperman: The Life and Times of Ben Bradlee--the executive editor who presided over the Washington Post’s coverage of the Watergate scandal that drove Richard Nixon from office--quickly emerges as a heroic figure. What’s not so expected, what comes as something bordering on shock, of a gratifying kind, is how much else the film takes on in this buoyant and mercilessly frank look at Bradlee’s life and career." In a more mixed review, Verne Gay of Newsday gave the film two and a half stars out of four and said, "In the argot of Bradlee’s glorious trade, “The Newspaperman” is a puff piece. That’s OK. Bradlee deserves one. He was the greatest editor of one of the world’s greatest newspapers who supervised a story that will forever grace the Valhalla of journalism. But the problem with puffery, however well-meaning, is that it obscures subtler, more complicated, perhaps less complimentary truths."

=== Accolades ===
Date of ceremony	Award ceremony	Category	Recipient(s)	Result	Ref.
January 20, 2018	29th Annual Producers Guild of America Awards	Outstanding Producer of Documentary Theatrical Motion Pictures	Teddy Kunhardt and George Kunhardt	Nominated	

== See also ==
- List of HBO Films films
- The Post
