= Chernobyl: The Lost Tapes =

2022 documentary film

- Poster
- Directed by: James Jones
- Produced by: James Jones
- Production companies: Top Hat Productions; Sky Documentaries; HBO Documentary Films
- Distributed by: Sky Studios; HBO Max; HBO
- Release date: 28 February 2022
- Running time: 91 minutes
- Country: United Kingdom
- Languages: Russian; Ukrainian; English

Chernobyl: The Lost Tapes is a 2022 British documentary film, directed and produced by James Jones. It tells the story of the Chernobyl disaster using personal interviews with people who were there and newly discovered, dramatic footage filmed at the nuclear plant, most of it never seen before in the West. It was released for streaming on Sky UK on 28 February 2022 and on HBO platforms on 22 June 2022.
