= The Perfect Weapon (2020 film) =

2020 documentary film

- Film poster
- Directed by: John Maggio
- Based on: The Perfect Weapon: War, Sabotage, and Fear in the Cyber Age by David E. Sanger
- Music by: Gary Lionelli
- Production companies: Ark Media; HBO Documentary Films
- Distributed by: HBO
- Release date: October 16, 2020
- Country: United States
- Language: English

The Perfect Weapon is a 2020 documentary film directed by John Maggio produced by Ark Media and HBO Documentary Films. Based on the book of the same name by David E. Sanger, the film details the rise of cyberwarfare and cyber spying on an international scale. The film premiered on October 16, 2020 on HBO, including streaming on HBO Max.
