= Very Ralph =

Documentary film about Ralph Lauren

Very Ralph is a 2019 documentary film about fashion designer Ralph Lauren. It was directed and produced by Susan Lacy.
