= Fukushima: A Nuclear Nightmare =

2026 American documentary film

- Film poster
- Directed by: James Jones; Megumi Inman
- Produced by: Megumi Inman
- Cinematography: Jean-Louis Schuller
- Edited by: Rupert Houseman
- Production companies: Blast Films; HBO Documentary Films; Dogwoof
- Distributed by: Dogwoof (United Kingdom); HBO (United States)
- Release dates: February 20, 2026 (United Kingdom); March 10, 2026 (United States)
- Running time: 90 minutes
- Countries: United States; United Kingdom
- Languages: English; Japanese

Fukushima: A Nuclear Nightmare is a 2026 British-American documentary film directed by James Jones and Megumi Inman. It explores the Fukushima nuclear accident on March 11, 2011.

It was released in the United Kingdom on February 20, 2026, by Dogwoof, and in the United States on March 10, 2026, by HBO Documentary Films.

== Premise ==
Explores the Fukushima nuclear accident, told through real-time detail with interviews from government advisors, power plant engineers, consultants and journalists, and emergency workers.

== Production ==
In February 2025, it was announced James Jones and Megumi Inman would direct a documentary revolving around the Fukushima nuclear accident, with Dogwoof set to distribute in the United Kingdom.

== Release ==
It was released in the United Kingdom on February 20, 2026, by Dogwoof. It was released in the United States on March 10, 2026, by HBO Documentary Films.

== Reception ==
=== Critical reception ===
Peter Bradshaw of The Guardian gave the film four out of five stars, writing: "This is a gripping film." Mansel Stimpson of Film Review Daily praised the film, writing: "Its importance lies in its first-hand account by those who were present."
