= Russell Lord =

American writer and curator (born 1977)

Russell Lord (born 1977) is an American writer and curator working in the field of photography and the history of art. He is currently the Chief of Curatorial Affairs at the Norman Rockwell Museum. He previously served as the Director of Exhibitions and Curatorial Initiatives at the American Federation of Arts (2023-2024) and the Freeman Family Curator of Photographs, Prints, and Drawings at the New Orleans Museum of Art, a position he held from October 2011 to April 2023.

== Life and work ==
Lord was born and raised in Massachusetts and Virginia. He received a B.A. in art history and French from James Madison University in 2000, and an M.Phil. in art history from The Graduate Center of the City University of New York in 2009. His graduate work focused on 19th-century French and British photography and its relationship to printmaking.

Prior to his graduate work, Lord worked at the Yale University Art Gallery in the Department of Prints, Drawings, and Photographs from 2000 to 2003. During that time he coordinated the production of a major monograph on photographer Emmet Gowin’s aerial work, Changing the Earth.

While enrolled as a graduate student, Lord was awarded a Jane and Morgan Whitney Fellowship to continue research on his doctoral dissertation and participate in the activities of the Metropolitan Museum of Art’s Department of Photographs. During the course of the two-year fellowship, he researched the Met's collection of early photography, and presented excerpts from two chapters of his dissertation. Lord organized an exhibition for the Johnson Galleries at the Met and assisted Malcolm Daniel on the exhibition Stieglitz, Steichen, Strand.

In 2011, Lord accepted the position of "Freeman Family Curator of Photographs, Prints, and Drawings" at the New Orleans Museum of Art. Since arriving at the museum, Lord has organized dozens of exhibitions on historic and contemporary photographs, prints, and drawings, working with artists such as Willie Birch, Edward Burtynsky, Lee Friedlander, Dawn DeDeaux, Vera Lutter, and more. In conjunction with these exhibitions, Lord organized and participated in a variety of programs, including interviewing Pulitzer Prize winning writer Tony Kushner about his work on the Steven Spielberg film Lincoln.

In 2013, Lord organized Gordon Parks: The Making of an Argument, an exhibition about the process behind Gordon Parks’ first photographic essay for LIFE magazine. The exhibition originated at NOMA then traveled to five other venues: The Faulconer Gallery at Grinnell College, The Fralin Museum of Art at the University of Virginia, The Frances Lehman Loeb Art Center at Vassar College, and the Berkeley Art Museum and Pacific Film Archive at the University of California, Berkeley.

During his time at NOMA, Lord has increased the museum's photography collection by over 30%, bringing the collection's total to around 12,000 works. Along with museum Director Susan M. Taylor, Lord helped organize the creation and endowment in 2013 of the A. Charlotte Mann and Joshua Pailet Gallery, a gallery dedicated to photographic works on paper. In 2018, the photography department was promised a donation of 1,300 photographs from the collection of Tina Freeman by artists such as Dorothea Lange, Sally Mann, Irving Penn, and Alfred Stieglitz. This donation was hailed as the “largest and most significant single gift of photographs in the institution’s history.”

In 2018, Lord published Looking Again: Photography at the New Orleans Museum of Art in conjunction with Aperture and the New Orleans Museum of Art. The book, a survey of the museum's photography collection, examines 131 photographic objects, many of which "actively embraced [photography's] curious connection to death and its unique capacity to simultaneously record reality and warp it."

In 2019, Lord secured another major gift for the photography department, when Del and Ginger Hall established a fund to support the department's activities. As Ginger Hall explained, “[Lord] nurtured a relationship that’s helped us grow and consider ways we might inspire others.” Also that year, In 2019, Lord was a visiting instructor at the University of New Orleans, teaching a class on the history of photography and curatorial practice.

It was announced in February, 2021, that NOMA was bequeathed Dr. H. Russell Albright's photography collection of over 350 works. Primarily masterworks by contemporary photographers such as Thomas Ruff, Cindy Sherman, Lorna Simpson, and Hiroshi Sugimoto, the collection also includes some examples of earlier twentieth-century photography by such artists as Brassaï, Bill Brandt, Man Ray, and many others. “Russell Albright’s eye was incredibly discerning, a trait that is visible across his collection, be it in his selection of a rich modernist print from the 1930s or a powerful contemporary photograph” said Lord. “Albright never shied away from adventurous or even controversial images, amassing a collection that is as critical as it is beautiful.”

Lord serves on the advisory board of The Gordon Parks Foundation, and is an at-large board member of the New Orleans Photo Alliance. He lives in the Berkshires with his wife and two children.

In April 2023, Lord was appointed Director of Exhibitions and Curatorial Initiatives at the American Federation of Arts. https://www.amfedarts.org/afa-staff/

In October 2024, Lord was appointed Chief of Curatorial Affairs at the Norman Rockwell Museum.

== Selected exhibitions curated by Lord ==
- 2011: Making a Mark: The Dorothy and Herbert Vogel Collection, New Orleans Museum of Art
- 2012: What is a Photograph? New Orleans Museum of Art; Photography, Sequence, and Time, New Orleans Museum of Art
- 2013: Shadow and Light, New Orleans Museum of Art; The Story in Pictures: Social Documents from the Permanent Collection, New Orleans Museum of Art; Gordon Parks: The Making of an Argument, New Orleans Museum of Art;Edward Burtynsky: Water, Contemporary Arts Center, New Orleans; Photography at NOMA, New Orleans Museum of Art
- 2014: Photo-Unrealism, New Orleans Museum of Art; Emmet Gowin: Concerning America and Alfred Stieglitz, and Myself, New Orleans Museum of Art; Josephine Sacabo: Salutations, New Orleans Museum of Art
- 2015: Ten Years Gone, New Orleans Museum of Art; Vera Lutter: Inverted Worlds (organized in association with the Houston Museum of Fine Arts), New Orleans Museum of Art; Paper Negatives | Negative Image, New Orleans Museum of Art
- 2016: Kenneth Josephson: Photography Is, New Orleans Museum of Art; Something in the Way: A Brief History of Photography and Obstruction, New Orleans Museum of Art
- 2017: Jim Steg: New Work, New Orleans Museum of Art
- 2018: Lee Friedlander in Louisiana, New Orleans Museum of Art
- 2019: Past Present Future: Building Photography at NOMA, New Orleans Museum of Art; You Are Here: A Brief History of Photography and Place, New Orleans Museum of Art

== Books and essays ==
- “Process and Progress: George Seeley and the Pictorial Recipe," Yale University Art Gallery Bulletin, 2003
- “The Ghosting of Photography” Visual Resources, June, 2010
- “Faithful Delineations: Rev. George Wilson Bridges and his Photographs of Palestine” in Breaking New Ground: New Perspectives on Caribbean History, Culture, Literature, and Education, Kingston: Ian Randle, 2011
- Gordon Parks: The Making of an Argument, Göttingen, Germany: Steidl, the New Orleans Museum of Art, and The Gordon Parks Foundation, 2013
- Edward Burtynsky: Water, Göttingen: The New Orleans Museum of Art and Steidl, 2013
- “The Treachery of Images: Photo-Unrealism” in Photorealism: Beginnings to Today, New York: Scala Arts and Heritage Publishers, 2014
- “Obscure Histories: The Salted Paper Print in the United States” in Natural Magic: The Salt Print in North America, Seattle: University of Washington Press and the Santa Barbara Museum of Art, 2015
- “The Interested Landscape” in East of the Mississippi: Nineteenth-Century American Landscape Photography, New Haven: Yale University Press in association with the National Gallery of Art and the New Orleans Museum of Art, 2017
- Looking Again: Photography at the New Orleans Museum of Art, New York: Aperture and the New Orleans Museum of Art, 2018
