= Katrina Babies =

2022 documentary film

- Official release poster
- Directed by: Edward Buckles Jr.
- Written by: Edward Buckles Jr.; Luther Clement Lam; Audrey Rosenberg
- Produced by: Edward Buckles Jr.; Audrey Rosenberg; Rebecca Teitel
- Starring: Miesha Williams; Cierra Chenier; Arnold Burks; Damaris Calliet; Calvin Baxter; Quintina Thomas Green
- Cinematography: Edward Buckles Jr.
- Edited by: Fiona Otway; Luther Clement Lam
- Music by: Osei Essed
- Production companies: Invisible Pictures; Time Studios
- Distributed by: HBO
- Release date: June 14, 2022 (Tribeca Festival)
- Running time: 79 minutes
- Country: United States
- Language: English

Katrina Babies is a 2022 documentary film, directed by Edward Buckles Jr. It explores the narratives of kids who experienced Hurricane Katrina and the impact of the storm’s aftermath on New Orleans youth. It premiered at the Tribeca Festival on June 14, 2022 and was released on HBO Max on August 24, 2022.

The film was first announced on August 26, 2021, the 16-year anniversary of the formation of Hurricane Katrina. New Orleans filmmaker Edward Buckles Jr., who was 13 years old during Katrina and its initial aftermath, spent seven years documenting the stories of his peers who survived the storm as children, using his community’s tradition of oral storytelling to open a door for healing and to capture the strength and spirit of his city.

== Synopsis ==
Sixteen years after Hurricane Katrina devastated New Orleans, an entire generation still grapples with the lifelong impact of having their childhood redefined by tragedy. Katrina Babies details the close-knit families and vibrant communities of New Orleans whose lives were uprooted by the 2005 disaster. These American children who were airlifted out of the rising waters, evacuated from their homes to refugee-like centers, or placed in makeshift, temporary living situations, have been neglected. As families were tasked with reintegrating into new communities, having experienced loss, displacement, and lack of support from government officials, the children were left to process their trauma in a wounded, fractured city.

Buckles raises his camera to elevate the voices of his city; utilizing confessional-style footage, home movies, animation, harrowing archival footage, and candid interviews with Katrina survivors, Buckles unearths a reservoir of grief and suppressed emotion. Through these moving, first-hand accounts, Katrina Babies journeys toward healing, not just from the most destructive storm in U.S. history, but also from the multi-generational traumas of being black and disenfranchised in America. In the face of systemic racism, government neglect, and the unprocessed pain of family separations, the children of Katrina are left to chart their own path toward healing.

== Cast ==
- Miesha Williams
- Cierra Chenier
- Arnold Burks
- Damaris Calliet
- Calvin Baxter
- Quintina Thomas Green

== See also ==
- When the Levees Broke
