= Juilliard School =

American performing arts conservatory in New York City

The Juilliard School
- Former names: Institute of Musical Art (1905–1926); Juilliard School of Music (1926–1968)
- Type: Private conservatory
- Established: 1905; 121 years ago
- Founder: Frank Damrosch
- Accreditation: MSCHE
- Endowment: $1.38 billion (2021)
- President: Damian Woetzel
- Academic staff: 138 FT/ 314 PT (2023)
- Students: 1,028 (plus ~290 pre-college)
- Undergraduates: 619 (2023)
- Postgraduates: 409 (2023)
- Location: New York City, United States; 40°46′26″N 73°59′00″W
- Campus: Small urban
- Colors: Red and blue
- Mascot: Penguin
- Website: juilliard.edu

The Juilliard School (/ˈdʒuːli.ɑːrd/ JOO-lee-ard) is a private conservatory for performing arts in New York City, United States. Founded by Frank Damrosch as the Institute of Musical Art in 1905, the school later added dance and drama programs and became the Juilliard School, named after its principal benefactor Augustus D. Juilliard.

The school is composed of three primary academic divisions: dance, drama, and music, of which the last is the largest and oldest. Juilliard offers degrees for undergraduate and graduate students and liberal arts courses, non-degree diploma programs for professional artists, and musical training for pre-college students. Juilliard has a single campus at the Lincoln Center for the Performing Arts, comprising numerous studio rooms, performance halls, a library with special collections, and a dormitory. It has one of the lowest acceptance rates of schools in the United States. With a total enrollment of about 950 students, Juilliard has several student and faculty ensembles that perform throughout the year, most notably the Juilliard String Quartet.

Juilliard alumni have won 105 Grammy Awards, 62 Tony Awards, 47 Emmy Awards, and 24 Academy Awards, including two alumni with EGOTs. Musicians from Juilliard have pursued careers as international virtuosos and concertmasters of professional symphony orchestras. Its alumni and faculty include more than 16 Pulitzer Prize and 12 National Medal of Arts recipients.

== History ==
=== Early years: 1905–1946 ===
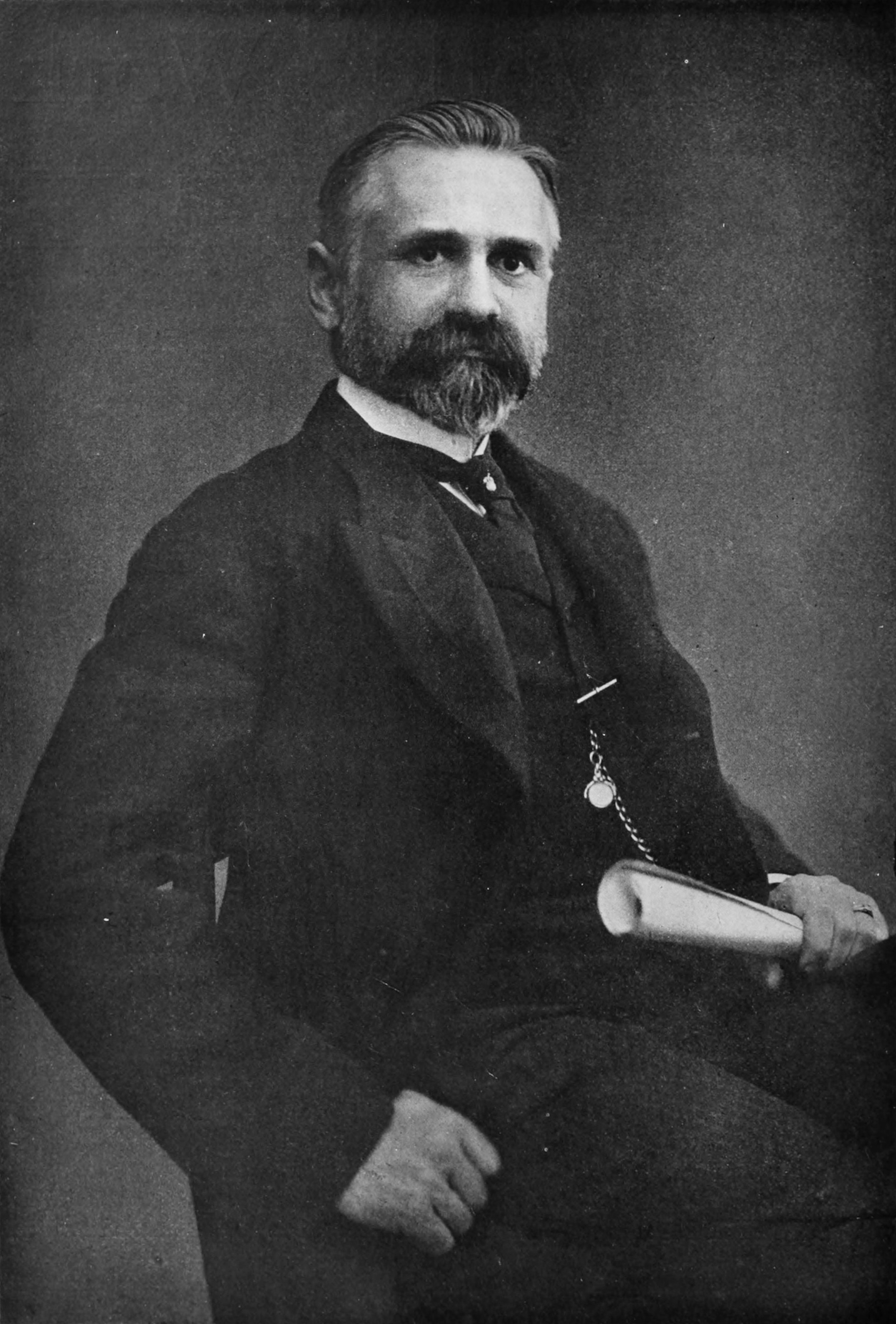
Frank Damrosch, founder of the Institute of Musical Art, commonly referred to as the "Damrosch School"

In 1905, the Institute of Musical Art (IMA), Juilliard's predecessor institution, was founded by Frank Damrosch, a German-American conductor and godson of Franz Liszt, on the premise that the United States did not have a premier music school and too many students were going to Europe to study music. Chartered by the Board of Regents of the University of the State of New York, the institute became one of first endowed music schools in the US, with significant funding provided by philanthropist and banker James Loeb. (Note: During the first decade of the 20th century, there were over forty conservatories in the United States. Unlike in Europe, these schools were privately funded, often relied on tuition or donations, and did not receive funding from the government. In the 1850s and 1860s, George Peabody had provided significant funding and endowment for the Peabody Institute (Peabody Conservatory of Music) in Baltimore. This funding included an initial gift of $300,000 and over $1,000,000 donated over twelve years. In 1905, James Loeb provided the Institute of Musical Art with an endowment of $500,000, the largest single, one-time endowment gift for a music school until that time.)

Damrosch and Loeb's mission was to establish a musical institution with high standards of teaching and learning that would incorporate a unified pedagogy and develop a "true musical culture among all classes". (Note: Damrosch visited several European conservatories to learn about their pedagogy and administration and observed that many lacked discipline or unified instruction. Damrosch wanted to form a school that trained musicians in the technicalities of their instruments and provided a comprehensive musical education with mandatory courses.) Accordingly, the school would rely on its endowment to ensure the quality of instruction was independent of students' financial status.

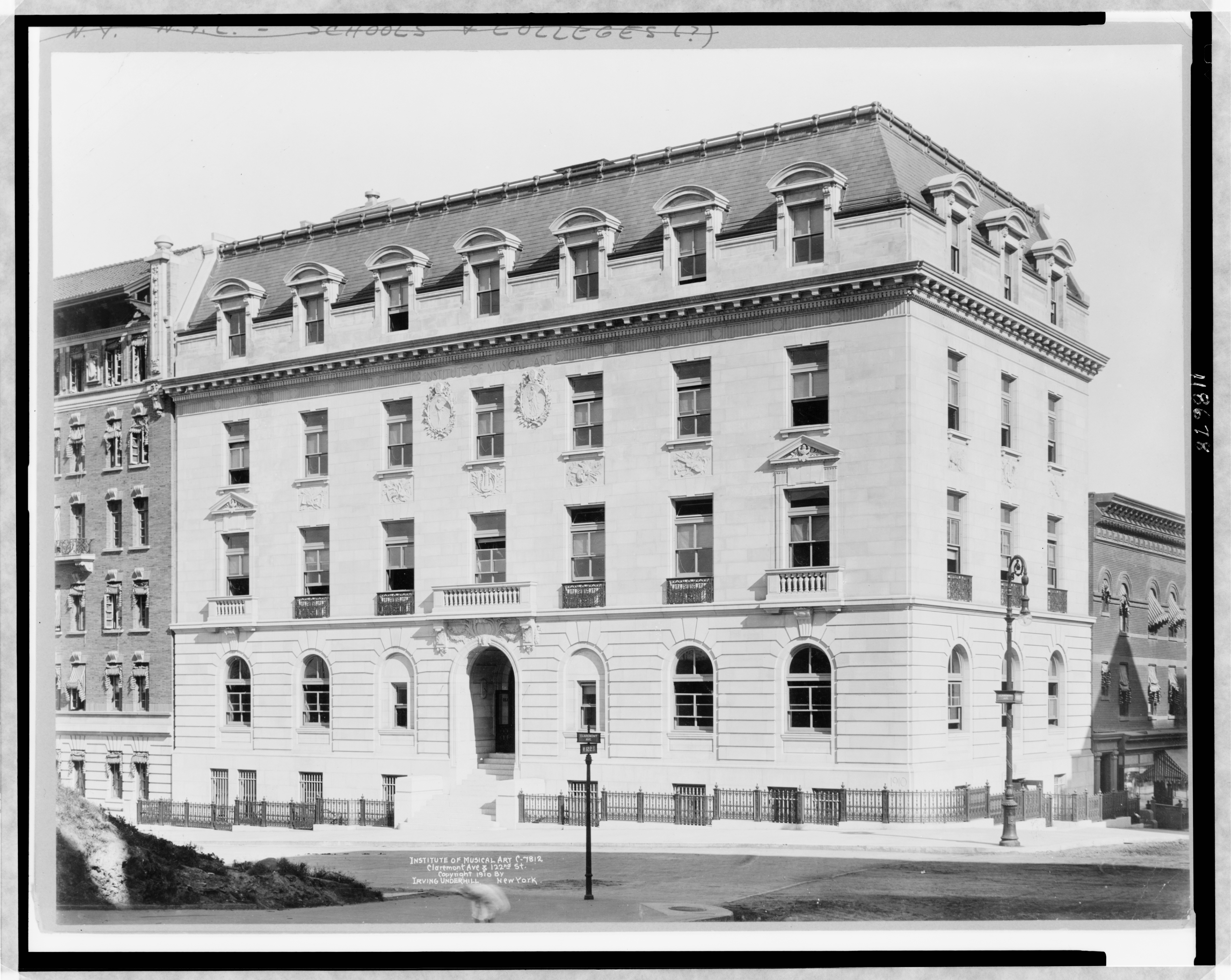
Institute of Musical Art at 120 Claremont Avenue in Manhattan

The Institute of Musical Art opened in the former Lenox Mansion, Fifth Avenue and 12th Street, on October 11, 1905. When the school opened, most teachers were European; however, only Americans were allowed to study at the institute. (Note: Members of the original faculty included notable figures such as members of the internationally known Kneisel Quartet, Sigismund Stojowski, Etelka Gerster, Georg Henschel, Georges Barrère, Gaston Dethier and Percy Goetschius. The school offered courses in voice culture, ear training, sight-singing, chorus, stringed instruments, organ, theory and composition, orchestral instruments, languages (French, German, Italian), and pedagogy. Walter Damrosch conducted the orchestra and chorus and taught sight-singing, ear training, and pedagogy courses.) Although orchestras were exclusively male, women made up most of the student population. The school had 467 students in the first year, but the enrollment soon doubled in size over the following years. Five years after its inception, the institute moved to 120 Claremont Avenue in the Morningside Heights neighborhood of Manhattan onto a property purchased from Bloomingdale Insane Asylum near the Columbia University campus.

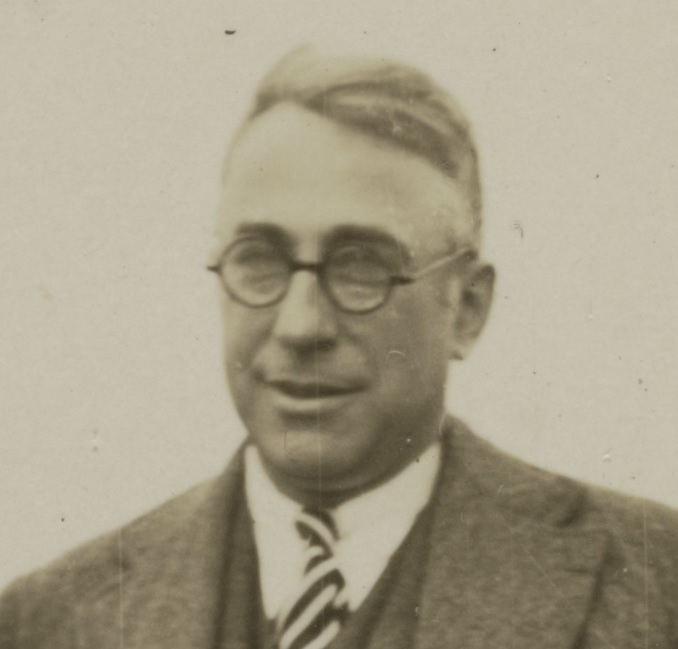
Columbia University English professor and first president of Juilliard, John Erskine

In 1919, a wealthy textile merchant named Augustus D. Juilliard died and left a vast sum of money for the advancement of music in his will, which set up the Juilliard Musical Foundation (JMF) a year later as one of its primary beneficiaries. Under Eugene Noble as executive secretary, the foundation purchased the Vanderbilt family guesthouse at 49 E. 52nd Street, and established a separate new music school, the Juilliard Graduate School (JGS), in 1924. (Note: The Juilliard Graduate School's first faculty members included well-known individuals like Ernst von Dohnányi, George Enescu, Rubin Goldmark, Paul Kochanski, Josef Lhevinne, César Thomson, Felix Salmond, Olga Samaroff and Marcella Sembrich. The school only offered fellowships to select students. However, it did not have a charter until 1930 and was not officially a graduate school. Further, the press heavily criticized the Juilliard Musical Foundation and Eugene Noble for mismanagement of its large endowment, arbitrary policies, and excessive interference in the school.)

After much discussion, the Juilliard School of Music was eventually created in 1926 through a merger of the institute and the graduate school. The JGS moved from E 52nd Street to 130 Claremont Avenue next to the IMA in 1931. The two schools had the same board of directors and president but maintained their distinct identities. Columbia University Professor John Erskine became the first president of the two institutions (1928–1937). Frank Damrosch continued as the institute's dean, and the Australian pianist and composer Ernest Hutcheson was appointed dean of the Graduate School. Hutcheson later served as president from 1937 to 1945. (Note: Under Ernest Hutcheson, the Juilliard Graduate School developed a strings orchestra and opera program that Albert Stoessel directed. Several students would go on to perform lead roles at the Metropolitan Opera. The Graduate School attempted to influence the Met and developed the Metropolitan Popular Season that showcased modern American works, but its influence only lasted a few years.)

=== Expansion and growth: 1946–1990 ===
Juilliard's third president, William Schuman, an American composer and the first Pulitzer Prize for Music winner, led the school from 1945 to 1961 and brought about several significant changes to raise the school's academic standards. In 1946, Schuman completely consolidated the Institute of Musical Art and the Juilliard Graduate School to form a single institution and created the Juilliard String Quartet as the school's main quartet-in-residence. (Note: William Schuman, a graduate from Columbia's Teachers College (BS 1935, MA 1937), attended the Juilliard Summer School in 1932, 1933 and 1936. While attending Juilliard Summer School, he developed a personal dislike for traditional music theory and ear training curricula, finding little value in counterpoint and dictation. When Schuman became president, he brought several new teachers to the school, including violinist Ivan Galamian, pianist Beveridge Webster, cellist Leonard Rose, and conductor Jean Morel.) During his tenure, Schuman cut down enrollment by more than half, eliminated the Juilliard Summer School and Music Education Program, (Note: The school had about 1,400 students in 1945, which decreased to 600 students at the end of Schuman's tenure in 1961. After World War II, more than 500 were supported by the G.I. Bill.) and opened Juilliard's admission to non-Americans. (Note: The Juilliard Graduate School previously allowed students from Australia to enter the school since the former president Ernest Hutcheson was from Australia. In 1946, about 52 international students enrolled in Juilliard, making up 2 percent of the student population. The two most represented countries were Canada and Australia. In 1950, the percentage of international was 8.5 percent, with many students coming from Israel. Later Japanese and Korean students would make up the most significant portion of internationals.)

Schuman discontinued the Theory Department and initiated a new curriculum called the Literature and Materials of Music (L&M), which began in 1947–1948, and was based on the assumption that musical theory education "should transfer theoretical knowledge into practical performance". Designed for composers to teach, the more practical-orientated curriculum would provide an overview of the "literature of music". L&M was a reaction against more formal theory and ear training, and as a result did not have a formal structure and allowed for more flexibility. (Note: The general mandate was "to give the student an awareness of the dynamic nature of the materials of music". The quality and degree of each student's education in harmony, music history, or ear training depended on how each composer-teacher decided to interpret this mandate. In the first couple of years, students from all musical backgrounds would study together and obtain a general survey of music materials and literature. Later years would focus on the literature specific to one's musical instrument or area of study.)

Schuman established the school's Dance Department under Martha Hill's direction in 1951, intending that students in the program would receive an education in dance, choreography, and music. The department, later renamed the Dance Division, offered performance opportunities through the Juilliard Dance Theatre (1954–1958) and later the Juilliard Dance Ensemble (founded c. 1960), which often collaborated with the Juilliard Orchestra. For many years, the Juilliard Dance Department shared facilities with the School of American Ballet.

In 1957, after two years of deliberation, the Juilliard School of Music board announced that the school would relocate from upper Manhattan to the future Lincoln Center. The Lincoln Center would cover the costs for the construction project, but the school would have to instruct exclusively advanced students, introduce a drama program and cut its Preparatory School. (Note: The committee that created the Lincoln Center, which included Charles Spofford and John D. Rockefeller III, wanted to have an educational center at the Lincoln Center. The committee looked at several possibilities, including the Juilliard School of Music, Columbia University, and New York University, but did not consider the Mannes College of Music or Manhattan School of Music. The main requirement was that the school should focus on professional and advanced training for performance.) Juilliard's new building at the Lincoln Center would be designed by Pietro Belluschi with associates Eduardo Catalano and Helge Westermann. The Juilliard School building at the Lincoln Center was completed on October 26, 1969, officially opening with a dedication ceremony and concert. (Note: The opening ceremony included a concert at Alice Tully Hall (built into the Juilliard School) with the Juilliard Orchestra under Leopold Stokowski and Jean Paul Morel, and with soloists Itzhak Perlman, Shirley Verrett, and Van Cliburn.) (Note: Construction of the Lincoln Center began in 1959. However, the new Juilliard school building was only completed in 1969, even though it was one of the first structures to be included in the design of the Lincoln Center. Many factors contributed to this delay, such as the complexity of the building (with soundproof rooms and various-sized rooms having to be fit together), excessive engineering and material costs, and land disputes. The total cost of the Lincoln Center amounted to $185 million, of which nearly $30 million was for the new Juilliard school complex.) With Lincoln Center's prestige came a newly elevated status for the Juilliard School.

The Juilliard School at the Lincoln Center as initially opened in 1969

William Schuman assumed the presidency of the Lincoln Center in 1962 and composer Peter Mennin succeeded him. Mennin made substantial changes to the L&M program—ending ear training and music history, adding performances and composition in class, and hiring the well-known pedagogue Renée Longy to teach solfège. Mennin organized several new programs, such as Juilliard's Master Class Program and Doctoral Music Program. (Note: Mennin additionally started the American Opera Center, Conductors' Training Program, Contemporary Music Festival, Playwrights' Program and the Theater Center. Mennin brought several notable composers to teach at Juilliard, including Roger Sessions, Elliott Carter and David Diamond.) Under Mennin, Juilliard's international reputation grew as several alumni won competitive international competitions. (Note: Notable alumni, who won competitive international and national competitions and led international careers in the 1960s and 1970s, include Itzhak Perlman, Yo-Yo Ma, Leontyne Price, Kyung Wha Chung, and Pinchas Zukerman.) In the 1950s, the school received international attention when alumnus Van Cliburn won the International Tchaikovsky Competition.

In 1968, Mennin hired John Houseman to manage the new Drama Division as director and Michel Saint-Denis as associate director and consultant. The school's name was changed to The Juilliard School to reflect its broadened mission to educate musicians, dancers, directors, and actors. The drama department first only trained actors, of which the first class graduated as Group 1 in 1972, but added playwrights and directors programs in the 1990s. Houseman founded The Acting Company in 1972, which allowed Juilliard students to perform and tour throughout the country. Also in 1972, Lila Acheson Wallace donated $5 million to Juilliard, which later named the Lila Acheson Wallace American Playwrights Program after her.

=== Modernization: 1990–2020 ===
Juilliard's longest-serving president Joseph W. Polisi (1984–2017), helped the school modernize by developing educational outreach, formalizing and expanding its music programs, establishing interdisciplinary programs and reforming the school's finances. In 1991, Polisi founded the Music Advancement Program (MAP) to help underrepresented students affected by music education budget cuts throughout public schools in New York. (Note: That year, 40 students from across Manhattan, Brooklyn, Queens, and the Bronx successfully auditioned and were chosen to participate in the program. Like the pre-college division, it is a Saturday program.) Between 1990 and 1993, individual departments for all instruments and voice were established, the Meredith Willson Residence Hall was built next to the school, salaries for teachers were increased, and the school hoped to accept fewer people and eventually cut 100 students to allow for more funding. In 2001, the school established a jazz performance training program.

By the end of the 20th century, Juilliard had established itself as a prestigious performing arts school. At the time, graduates comprised approximately 20 percent of the Big Five American Orchestras and half of the New York Philharmonic. Juilliard's endowment nearly tripled over the 1980s, reaching a quarter billion in the mid-1990s. Despite high tuition fees, on average over 90 percent of accepted students ended up attending the school. In 1999, the Juilliard School was awarded the National Medal of Arts and became the first educational institution to receive the award.

In September 2005, Colin Davis conducted an orchestra that combined students from the Juilliard and London's Royal Academy of Music at the BBC Proms, and during 2008 the Juilliard Orchestra embarked on a successful tour of China, performing concerts as part of the Cultural Olympiad in Beijing, Suzhou, and Shanghai under the expert leadership of maestro Xian Zhang.

The school has received various gifts and donations since the 2000s. In 2006, Juilliard obtained a trove of precious music manuscripts from board chair and philanthropist Bruce Kovner that make up the Juilliard Manuscript Collection. Philanthropist James S. Marcus donated $10 million to the school to establish the Ellen and James S. Marcus Institute for Vocal Arts at the school in 2010. In 2014, Kovner gave $60 million for the Kovner Fellowship Program to provide expenses for exceptionally gifted students.

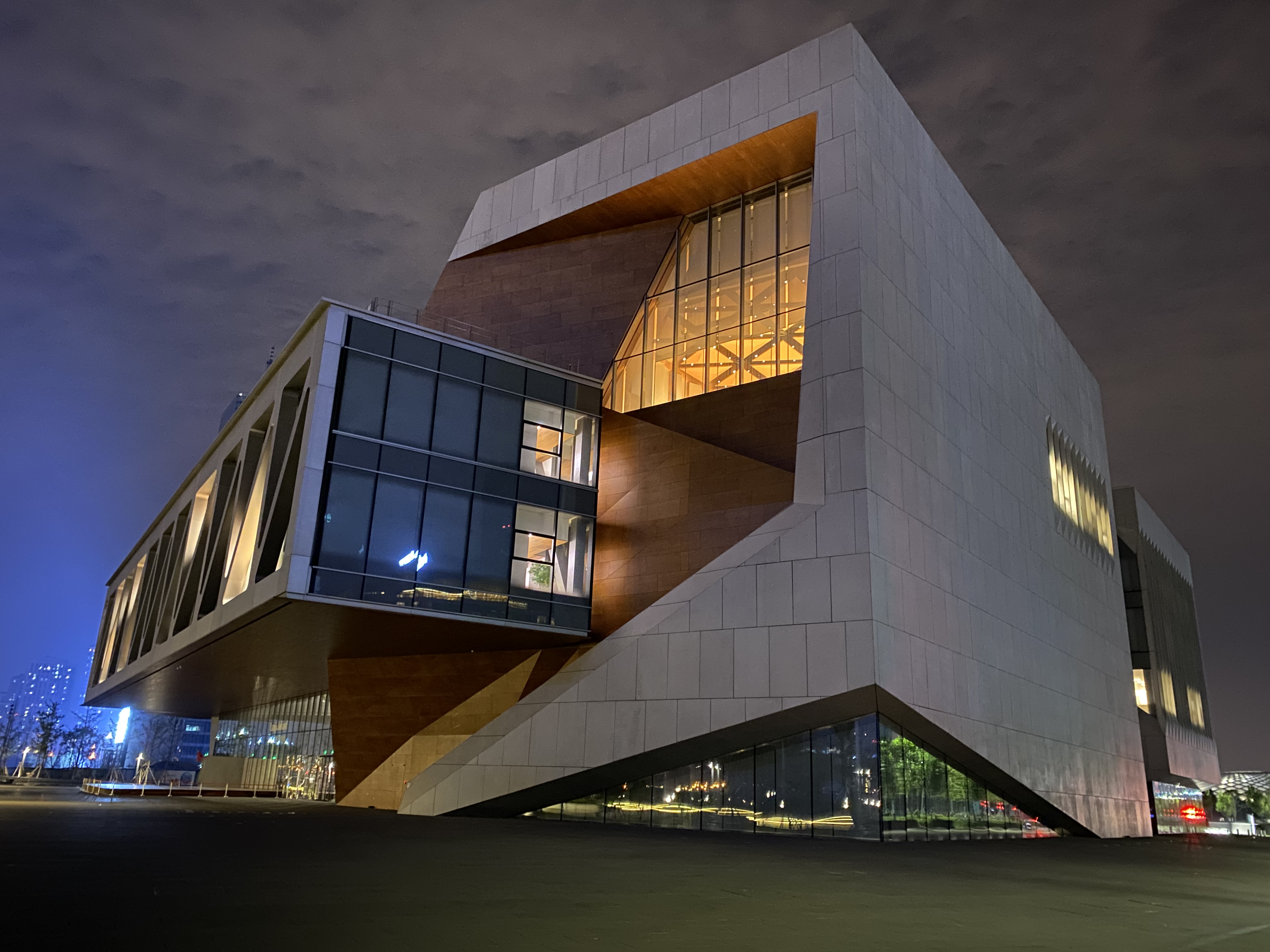
Tianjin Juilliard School

On September 28, 2015, the Juilliard School announced a major expansion into Tianjin during a visit by China's first lady, Peng Liyuan, the institution's first such full-scale foray outside the United States. The school opened in 2020 and offers a Master of Music degree program.

In May 2017, retired New York City Ballet principal dancer Damian Woetzel was named president, replacing Joseph W. Polisi. From March 2020 through the spring 2021 semester, the school switched to online classes and suspended live performances in response to the COVID-19 pandemic.

=== Post-pandemic: 2020–present ===
In June 2021, members of the student group The Socialist Penguins organized a protest against rising tuition costs after claiming that they "weren't being listened to" when meeting with president and provost about the tuition fees. In September, the school's Evening Division was renamed to Juilliard Extension which would broaden to offer programs in person and online. In December of the same year, a $50 million gift was given to the school's Music Advancement Program to help students of underrepresented backgrounds.

== Campus ==
Juilliard School Campus 1. Alice Tully Hall, 2. Irene Diamond Building, 3. Meredith Willson Residence Hall

The Juilliard School occupies a single main building, the Irene Diamond Building, in the Lincoln Center for the Performing Arts, along Broadway and West 65th Street. The Juilliard building contains several large studio rooms and performance venues, such as the Glorya Kaufman Dance Studio, Stephanie P. McClelland Drama Theater, Harold and Mimi Steinberg Drama Studio, the Judith Harris and Tony Woolfson Orchestral Studio, and Edwin and Nancy Marks Jazz Rehearsal Room. Recital halls include the Peter Jay Sharp Theater, Paul Recital Hall, and the Morse Recital Hall. The building also houses the Alice Tully Hall, where the Chamber Music Society of Lincoln Center performs.

Adjacent to the Juilliard building is the Samuel B. & David Rose Building, which is the home of the school's Meredith Willson Residence Hall, named after the composer, conductor and Juilliard alumnus Meredith Willson. The building consists of student dormitories, faculty suites, and studios for visiting artists. It is also home to the School of American Ballet.

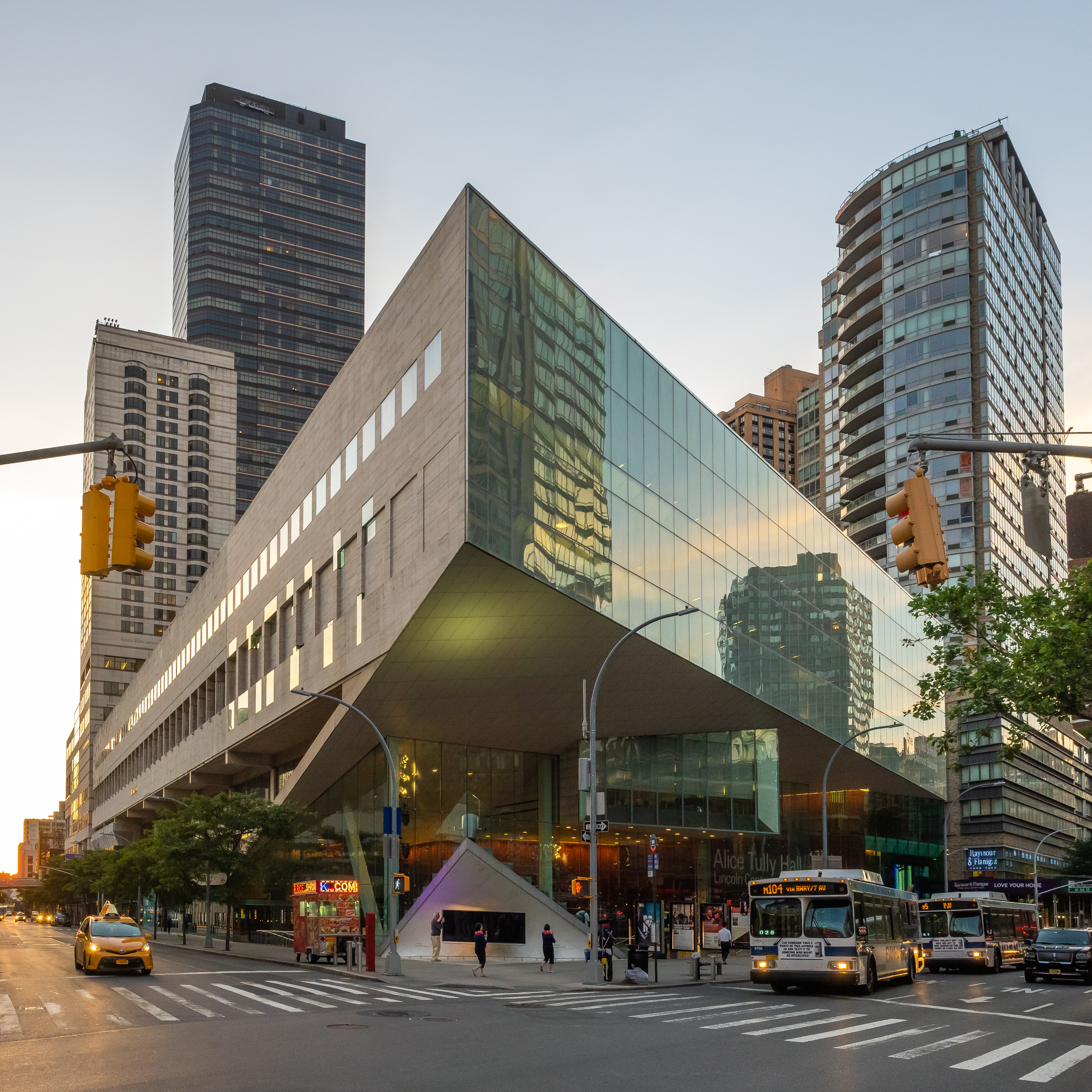
Alice Tully Hall

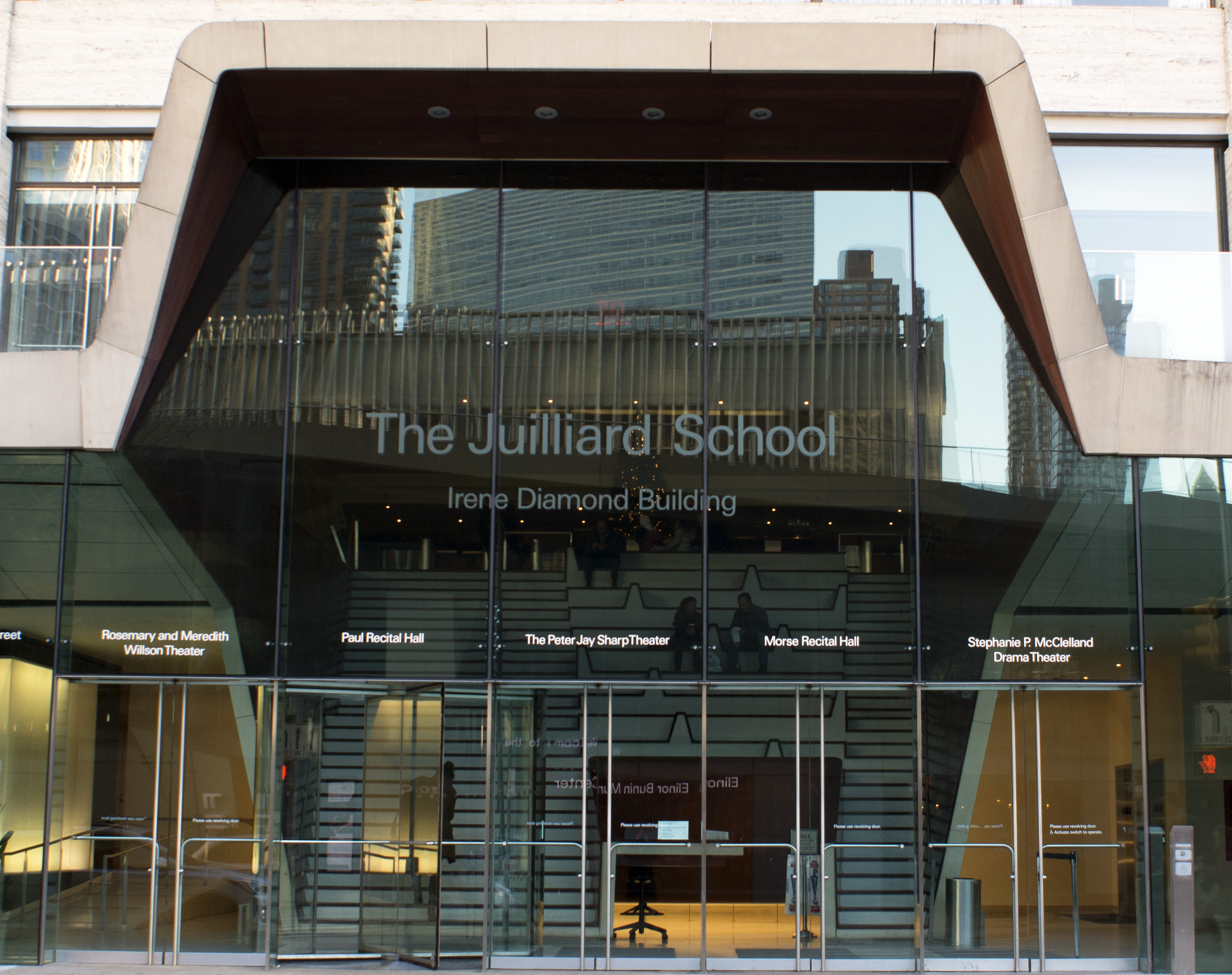
Main entrance

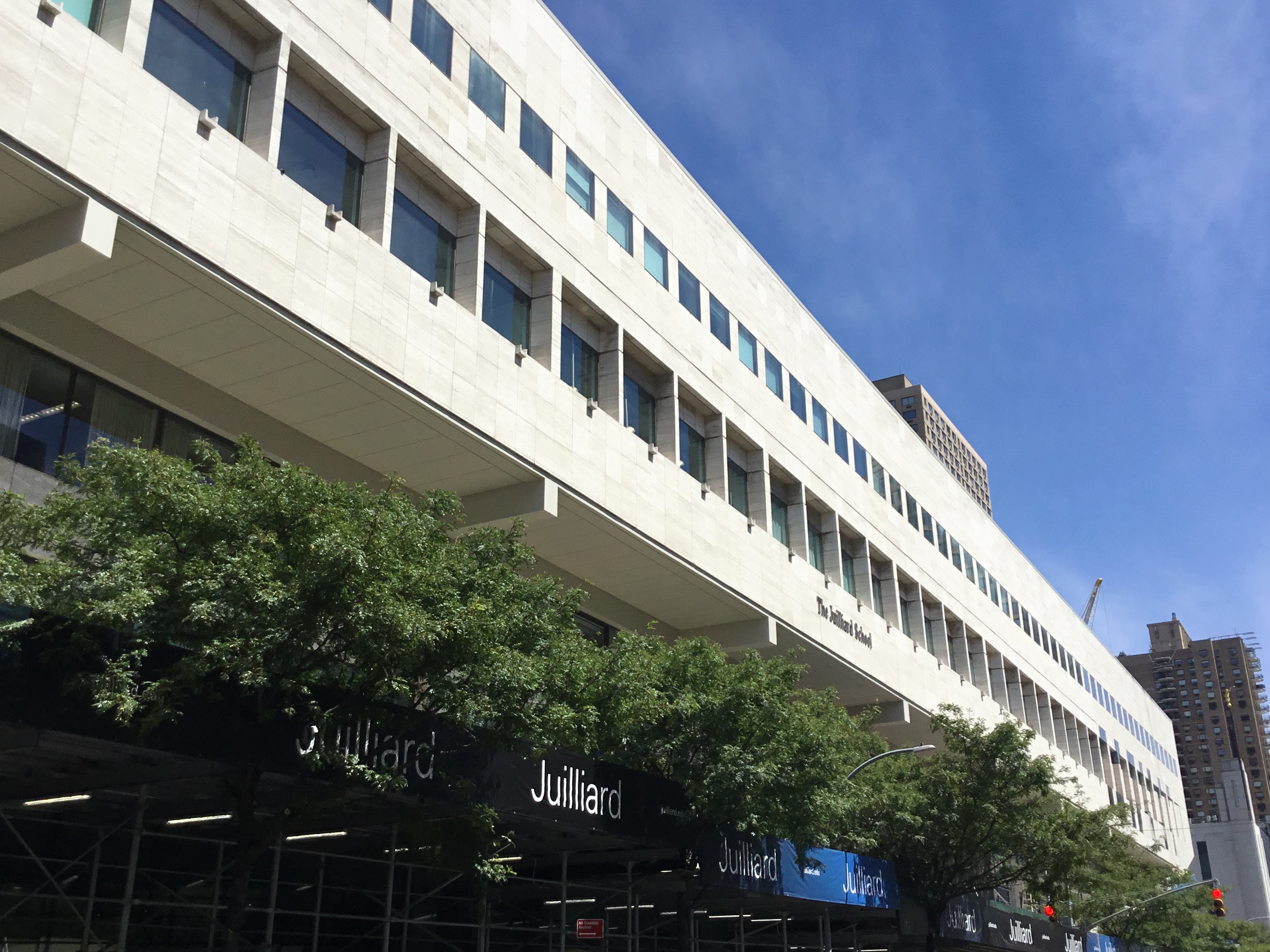
Irene Diamond Building

== Organization and administration ==
Juilliard's leadership and administration consist of a board of trustees, executive officers, and senior administrators. The board of trustees includes approximately thirty members, with a chair and two vice-chairs, and is responsible for appointing Juilliard's president and managing the school's business affairs. Executive offices include the offices of the president and provost. Four administrators serve each as dean and director of the dance, music, drama, and preparatory divisions. There is an additional director for the jazz program. Other academic subdivisions include the Ellen and James S. Marcus Institute for Vocal Arts and Lila Acheson Wallace Library. The vice president holds the position of chief advancement officer and manages the development of the school. Other administrative areas include the chief operating officer and corporate secretary, the public affairs office, and enrollment management and student development.

The Juilliard School has ties with higher education institutions such as Barnard College, Columbia University, and Fordham University and has associations with Nord Anglia Education for primary and secondary education since 2015. The school is accredited by the Middle States Commission on Higher Education (MSCHE), with its last reaffirmation in 2020.

== Academics ==
=== Admission ===
Juilliard admits both degree program seekers and pre-college division students. The latter enter a conservatory program for younger students to develop their skills; All applicants who wish to enroll in the Music Advancement Program, for the Pre-College Division, must perform an audition in person before members of the faculty and administration and must be between ages 8 and 18.

The Juilliard admissions program comprises several distinct steps. Applicants must submit a complete application, school transcripts, and recommendations; some majors also require that applicants submit prescreening recordings of their work, which are evaluated as part of the application. A limited number of applicants are then invited to a live audition, sometimes with additional callbacks. After auditions, the school invites select applicants to meet with a program administrator. The school has been considered one of the world's most prestigious conservatories.

Admission to the Juilliard School is highly competitive, as it ranks among the most selective schools in the United States. In 2007, the school received 2,138 applications for admission, of which 162 were admitted for a 7.6% acceptance rate. For the fall semester of 2009, the school had an 8.0% acceptance rate. In 2011, the school accepted 5.5% of applicants. For Fall 2012, 2,657 undergraduate applicants were received by the college division and 7.2% were accepted. The 75th percentile accepted into Juilliard in 2012 had a GPA of 3.96 and an SAT score of 1350.

A cross-registration program is available with Columbia University where Juilliard students who are accepted to the program are able to attend Columbia classes, and vice versa. The program is highly selective, admitting 10–12 students from Juilliard per year. Columbia students also have the option of pursuing an accelerated Master of Music degree at Juilliard and obtaining a bachelor's degree at Barnard or Columbia and an MM from Juilliard in five (or potentially six, for voice majors) years.

=== Academic programs ===
The school offers courses in dance, drama, and music. All Bachelor's and master's degree programs require credits from Liberal Arts courses, which include seminar classes on writing, literature, history, culture, gender, philosophy, environment, and modern languages.

The Dance Division was established in 1951 by William Schuman with Martha Hill as its director. It offers a Bachelor of Fine Arts or a Diploma. Areas of study include ballet and modern and contemporary dance, with courses ranging from dance technique and performance to dance studies. Since its inception, the dance program has had a strong emphasis not only on performance but also on choreography and collaboration.

The Drama Division was established in 1968 by the actor John Houseman and Michel Saint-Denis. Its acting programs offer a Bachelor of Fine Arts, a Diploma and, beginning in Fall 2012, a Master of Fine Arts. Until 2006, when James Houghton became director of the Drama Division, there was a "cut system" that would remove up to one-third of the second-year class. The Lila Acheson Wallace American Playwrights Program, begun in 1993, offers one-year, tuition-free, graduate fellowships; selected students may be offered a second-year extension and receive an Artist Diploma. The Andrew W. Mellon Artist Diploma Program for Theatre Directors was a two-year graduate fellowship that began in 1995 (expanded to three years in 1997); this was discontinued in the fall of 2006.

The Music Division is the largest of the school's divisions. Available degrees are Bachelor of Music or Diploma, Master of Music or Graduate Diploma, Artist Diploma and Doctor of Musical Arts. Academic majors are brass, collaborative piano, composition, guitar, harp, historical performance, jazz studies, orchestral conducting, organ, percussion, piano, strings, voice, and woodwinds. The largest music department is Juilliard's string department, followed by the piano department. The collaborative piano, historical performance, and orchestral conducting programs are solely at the graduate level; the opera studies and music performance subprograms only offer Artist Diplomas. The Juilliard Vocal Arts department now incorporates the former Juilliard Opera Center.

The school's non-degree diploma programs are for specialized training to advance a performer's professional career. These include undergraduate and graduate programs in dance, drama, and music. Musicians and performers can also complete Artist Diploma programs in jazz studies, performance, opera, playwriting, and string quartet studies.

=== Pre-College Division ===
The Pre-College Division teaches students enrolled in elementary, junior high, and high school. The Pre-College Division is conducted every Saturday from September to May in the Juilliard Building at Lincoln Center.

All students study solfège and music theory in addition to their primary instrument. Vocal majors must also study diction and performance. Similarly, pianists must study piano performance. String, brass and woodwind players, as well as percussionists, also participate in orchestra. The pre-college has two orchestras, the Pre-College Symphony (PCS) and the Pre-College Orchestra (PCO). Placement is by age and students may elect to study conducting, chorus, and chamber music.

The Pre-College Division began as the Preparatory Centers (later the Preparatory Division), part of the Institute of Musical Art since 1916. The Pre-College Division was established in 1969 with Katherine McC. Ellis as its first director. Olegna Fuschi served as director from 1975 to 1988. The Fuschi/Mennin partnership allowed the Pre-College Division to thrive, affording its graduates training at the highest artistic level (with many of the same teachers as the college division), as well as their own commencement ceremony and diplomas. In addition to Fuschi, directors of Juilliard's Pre-College Division have included composer Dr. Andrew Thomas. The current director of the Pre-College Division is Yoheved Kaplinsky.

=== Center for Innovation in the Arts ===
The Center for Innovation in the Arts (CIA), formerly called the Music Technology Center, at the Juilliard School was created in 1993 to provide students with the opportunity to use digital technology in the creation and performance of new music. Since then, the program has expanded to include a wide offering of classes, such as Introduction to Music Technology, Music Production, Film scoring, Computers In Performance and an Independent Study In Composition.

In 2009, the Music Technology Center moved to a new, state of the art facility that includes a mix and record suite and a digital "playroom" for composing and rehearsing with technology. Together with the Willson Theater, the Center for Innovation in the Arts is the home of interdisciplinary and electro-acoustic projects and performances at the Juilliard School.

=== Instruments ===
The Juilliard School has about 275 pianos, of which 231 are Steinway grand pianos. It is one of the world's largest collections of Steinway and Sons pianos in the space of concert halls and practice rooms.

Pipe organs at Juilliard include those by Holtkamp (III/57, III/44, II/7), Schoenstein (III/12), Flentrop (II/17), Noack (II/3) and Kuhn (IV/85), which are located in various practice rooms and recital halls.

The strings department allows students to borrow valuable historic stringed instruments for special concerts and competitions. There are more than 200 such stringed instruments, including several by Antonio Stradivari and Giuseppe Guarneri del Gesù.

=== Print and digital resources ===
The Lila Acheson Wallace Library is the main library at Juilliard that holds study scores, performance and sound recordings, books, and videos. The school's archives include manuscript collections with digitized holographs. The library has over 87,000 musical scores and 25,000 sound recordings. The Peter Jay Sharp Special Collections features the Igor and Soulima Stravinsky Collection, the Arthur Gold and Robert Fizdale Collection, and the Eugène Ysaÿe Collection.

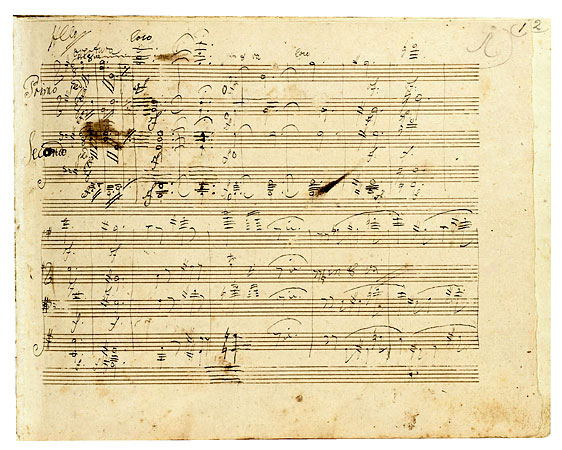
Manuscript of Beethoven's Grosse Fuge for piano four hands, part of the Juilliard Manuscript Collection

The school acquired the Juilliard Manuscript Collection in 2006, which includes autograph scores, sketches, composer-emended proofs and first editions of major works by Mozart, Bach, Beethoven, Brahms, Schumann, Chopin, Schubert, Liszt, Ravel, Stravinsky, Copland, and other composers of the classical music canon. Many of the manuscripts had been unavailable for generations. Among the items are the printer's manuscript of Beethoven's Ninth Symphony, complete with Beethoven's handwritten amendments, that was used for the first performance in Vienna in 1824; Mozart's autograph of the wind parts of the final scene of The Marriage of Figaro; Beethoven's arrangement of his monumental Große Fuge for piano four hands; Schumann's working draft of his Symphony No. 2; and manuscripts of Brahms's Symphony No. 2 and Piano Concerto No. 2. The entire collection has since been digitized and can be viewed online.

=== Rankings ===
Juilliard consistently ranks as one of the top performing arts schools in the world. Since Quacquarelli Symonds first published its QS World University Rankings for the subject performing arts in 2016, Juilliard held the top spot among academic institution for performing arts for six years. The school dropped its ranking to third place in 2022, falling behind the Royal College of Music and the University of Music and Performing Arts Vienna.

As part of Juilliard's ranking criteria for 2022, the school scored 100 out of 100 for academic reputation and 69.2 for employer reputation for an overall score of 93.8. Juilliard and the Curtis Institute of Music were the only two American conservatories that made the top ten in the 2022 QS World Rankings in performing arts. In another report, The Hollywood Reporter ranked the school first among drama schools in the world in 2021. According to The Hollywood Reporter's 2022 listing of the top-ranked music schools in the world, Juilliard ranked fourth.

== Student life ==
=== Student body and diversity ===
Student body composition as of May, 2022
Race and ethnicity	Total
White	34%
Foreign national	31%
Asian	11%
Hispanic	9%
Black	8%
Other (Note: Other consists of Multiracial Americans and those who prefer to not say.)	7%
Economic diversity
Low-income (Note: The percentage of students who received an income-based federal Pell Grant intended for low-income students.)	16%
Affluent (Note: The percentage of students who are a part of the American middle class or wealthier.)	84%

The Juilliard School enrolled 492 full-time undergraduates, 114 part-time undergraduates and 374 graduate students as of the 2019–2020 school year. Women made up 47% of all the students enrolled. The retention rate for that academic year was 94%. That same year, Juilliard awarded 116 Bachelor's Degrees and 140 Master's Degrees and had a graduation rate of 94%. Of the undergraduate degrees, 87 were in music, 20 in dance, and nine in drama. The school conferred 132 Master of Music Degrees and eight Master of Fine Arts Degrees in drama.

Juilliard has made efforts to diversify its student body and program. In 2001, the conservatory introduced a Jazz Studies Program, which Wynton Marsalis currently directs. The school launched an Equity, Diversity, Inclusion, and Belonging (EDIB) initiative in 2018, which includes a task force and provides workshops for all faculty and staff. Student Diversity Initiatives provide students forums and activities to educate the community on diversity, internationalism, culture and social justice. In the same year, Alicia Graf Mack, who previously danced with the Dance Theatre of Harlem, became the school's first black dance director. The school has recently invested in funding for minority students and schoolchildren to address inequalities. However, some have criticized the school's lack of diversity in its faculty and curriculum and focus on primarily Western Classical Music.

=== Student organizations ===
The Juilliard Black Student Union (JBSU) was founded in the fall of 2016. A group of students established the Alliance for Latin American & Spanish Students (ALAS) in the summer of 2018. The political organization, the Socialist Penguins, was created in 2021 to encourage "anti-capitalist and anti-racist discussions." Other Juilliard clubs include the Juilliard Chinese Student & Scholars Association (J-CSSA), the Juilliard Christian Fellowship (JCF) and the Juilliard Green Club, among others. Juilliard does not have any fraternities or sororities.

In the 1980s, Juilliard students assembled an ice hockey team called the Fighting Penguins to compete against a faculty team. The naming of the teams became the first usage of the penguin as the school's mascot. Later in the 1980s, the school had several running and racing events and a tennis team from the 1970s to 1990s. Today, there is a faculty-staff softball team and the student Juilliard Volleyball Club. However, no varsity teams play for the school.

=== Performing ensembles ===
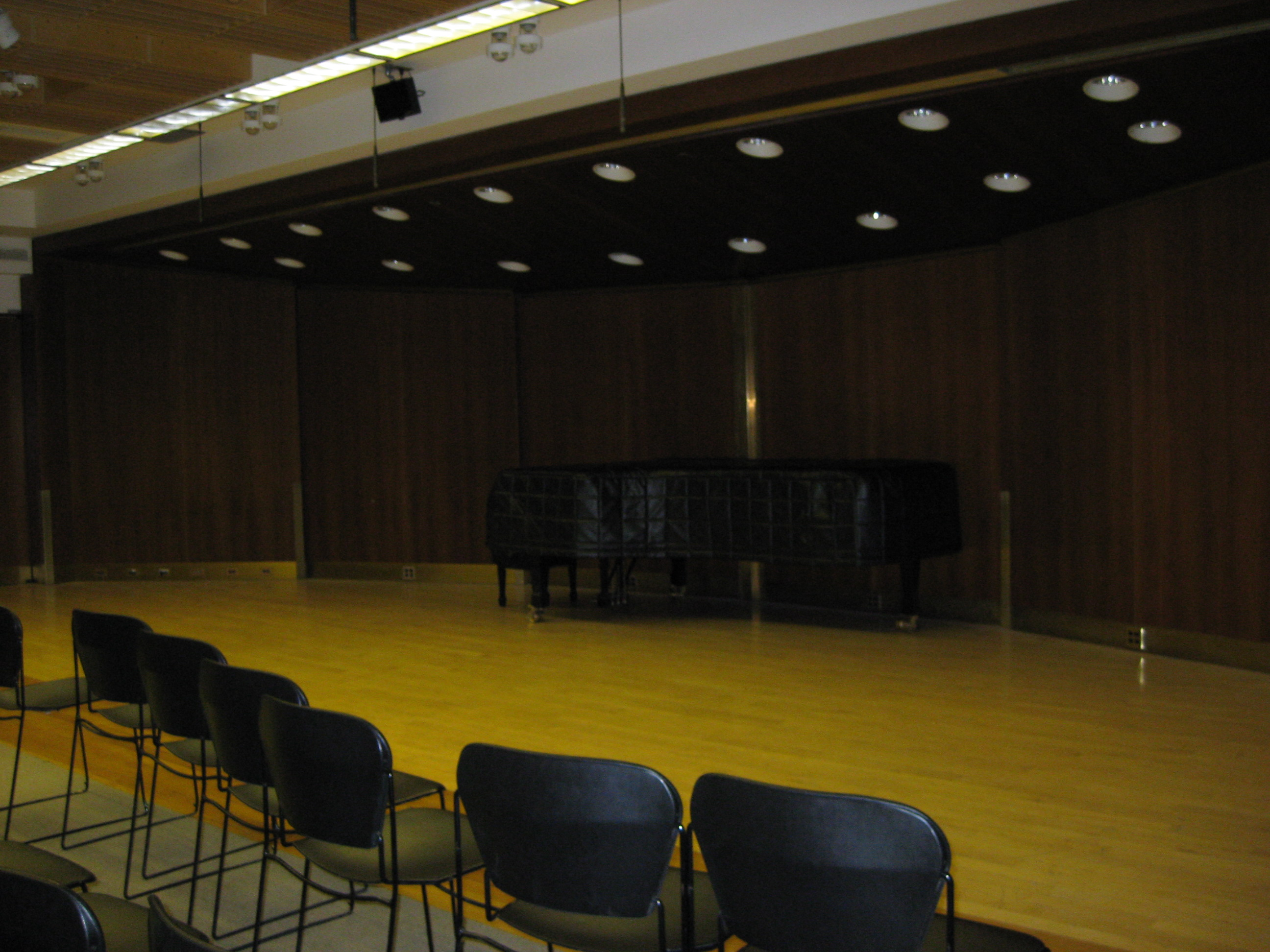
Morse Hall, one of the performing spaces inside the Juilliard School

The Juilliard School has a variety of ensembles, including chamber music, jazz, orchestras, and vocal/choral groups. Juilliard's orchestras include the Juilliard Orchestra, the Juilliard Chamber Orchestra, the Wind Orchestra, the New Juilliard Ensemble, the Juilliard Theatre Orchestra, and the Conductors' Orchestra. The Axiom Ensemble is a student directed and managed group dedicated to well-known 20th-century works.

Established in 2003, the Juilliard Electric Ensemble allows all students to use multi-media technology to produce and perform works. The ensemble has performed works that incorporate new technology by many contemporary composers.

In addition, Juilliard resident ensembles, which feature faculty members, perform frequently at the school. These groups include the Juilliard String Quartet and the American Brass Quintet, which are American ensembles that perform throughout the United States and abroad.

== Notable people ==
=== Alumni ===
Over the years, Juilliard alumni have contributed significantly to the arts and culture. Collectively, they have won numerous awards nationally and internationally, including more than 300 Grammy, Oscar, Emmy, and Tony Awards. Juilliard alumni include principal players and concertmasters of several symphony orchestras such as the New York Philharmonic, the Chicago Symphony Orchestra, the Philadelphia Orchestra and the Berlin Philharmonic. Other graduates have led international careers as soloists, playing with orchestras worldwide. (Note: Notable international concert soloists include the violinists Sarah Chang, Kyung Wha Chung, James Ehnes, Midori Goto, Nigel Kennedy, Bomsori Kim, Anne Akiko Meyers, Itzhak Perlman, Gil Shaham, Pinchas Zukerman, cellists Lynn Harrell, Yo-Yo Ma, pianists Lera Auerbach, Van Cliburn, Horacio Gutiérrez, Stephen Hough, Joseph Kalichstein, Alexis Weissenberg, and international singers Mario Frangoulis, Renée Fleming, Paul Groves, Isabel Leonard, Leontyne Price, Shirley Verrett, among others.) Juilliard alumni are the recipients of over 16 Pulitzer Prizes and 12 National Medals of Arts. Alumni have represented the United States as cultural ambassadors for the arts and include U.N. messengers of peace.

Notable Juilliard alumni include:

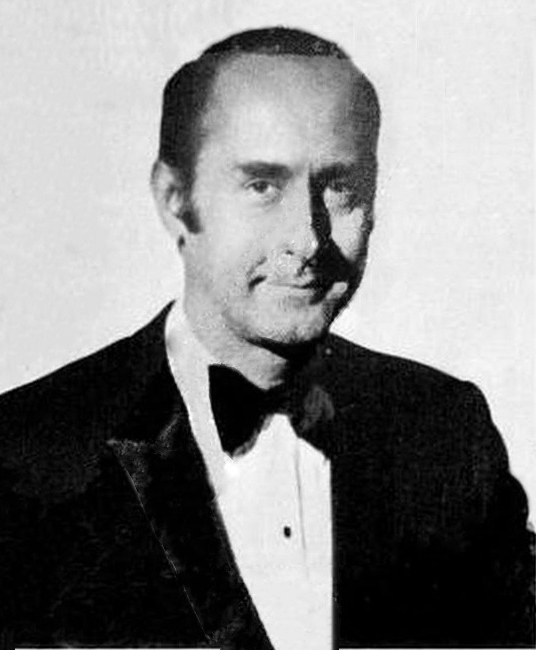
Henry Mancini, film composer and conductor (entered 1942, drafted for WWII)

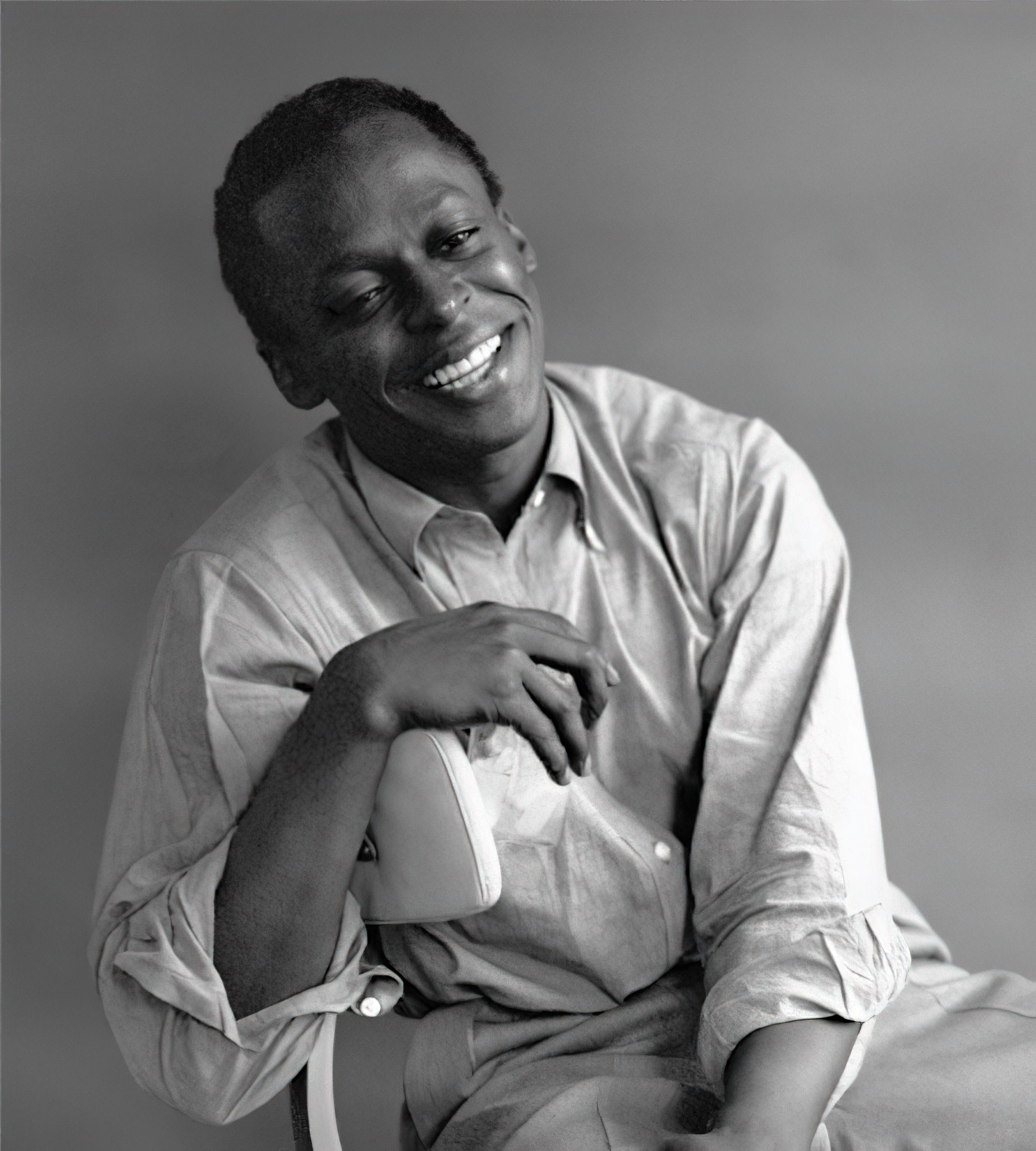
Miles Davis, jazz musician, trumpeter, bandleader, composer (entered Juilliard 1944)

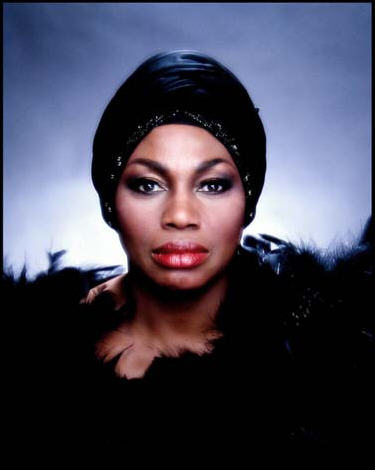
Leontyne Price, operatic soprano (Special Studies 1952)

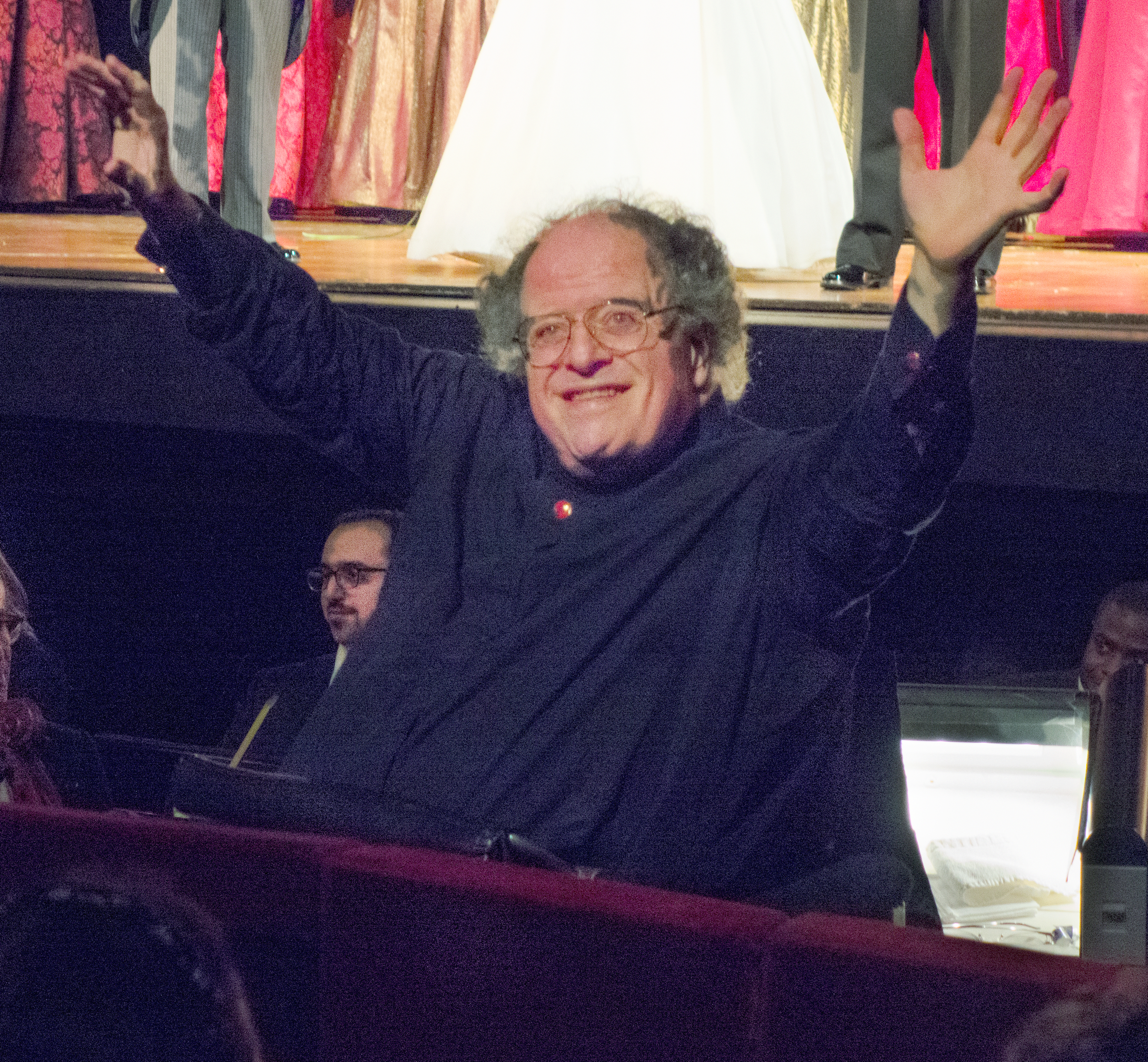
James Levine, conductor and pianist (graduated 1964)

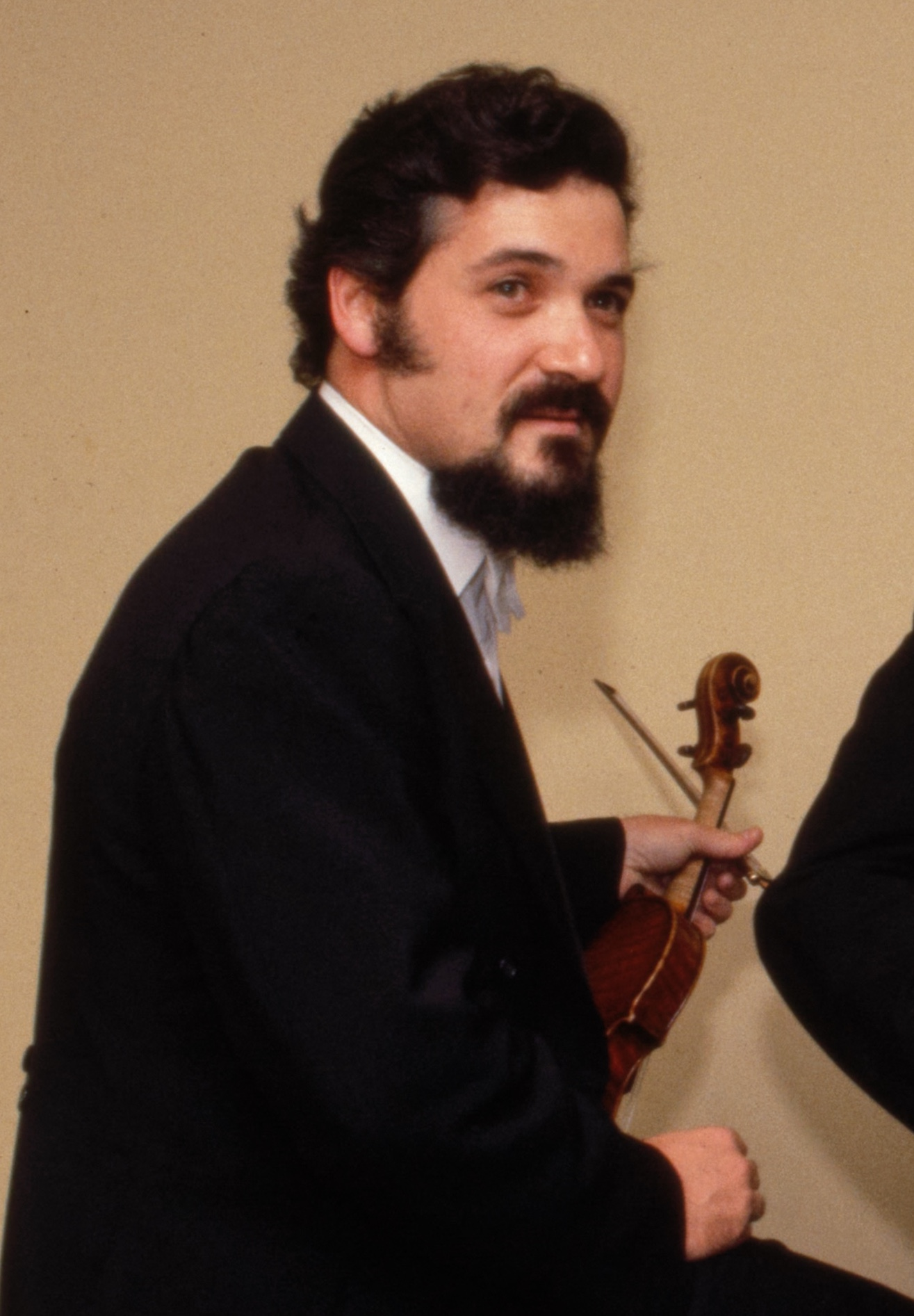
Pinchas Zukerman, violinist (Professional Studies, 1969)

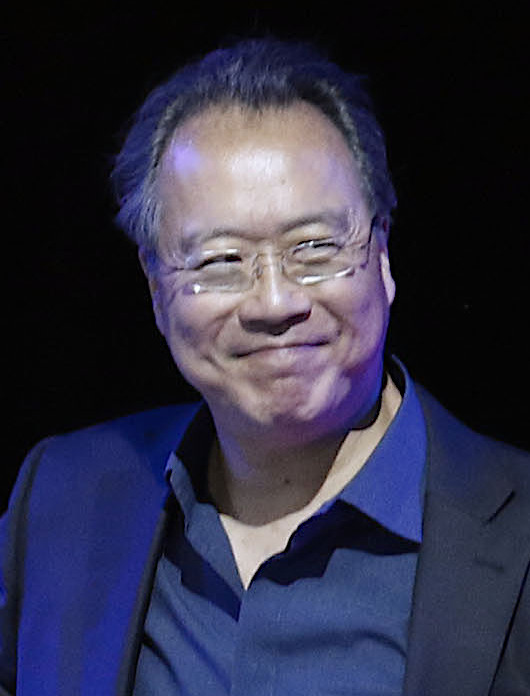
Yo-Yo Ma, cellist (Pre-College, 1971; Professional Studies, 1972)

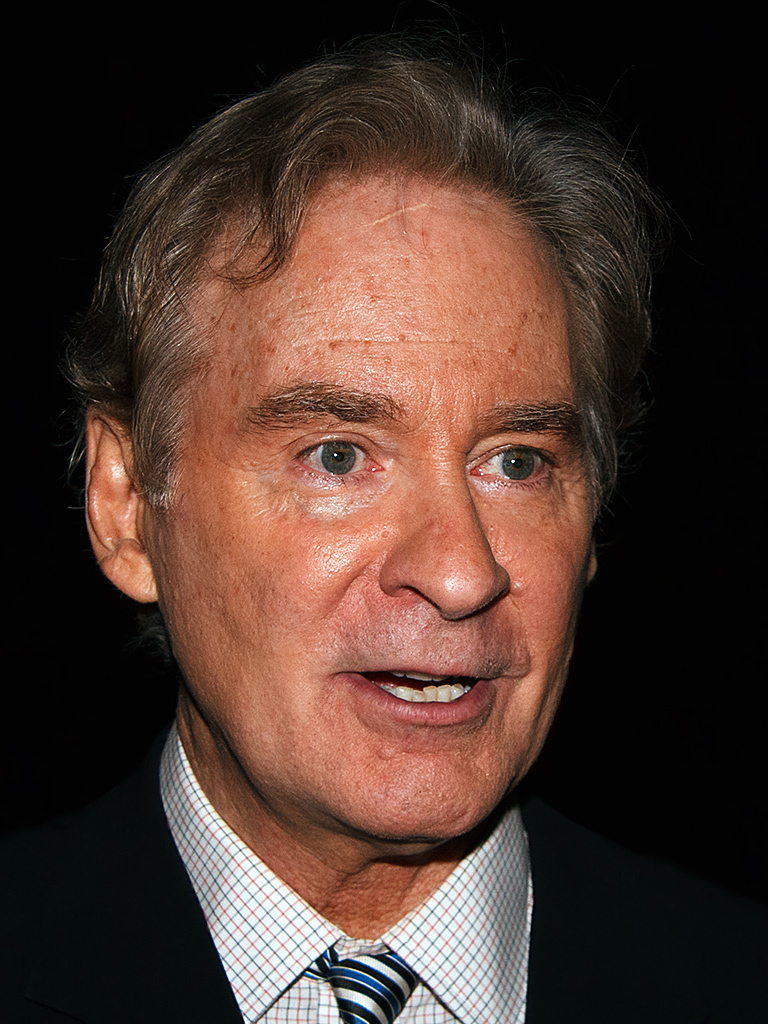
Kevin Kline, actor (GrDiP, 1972)

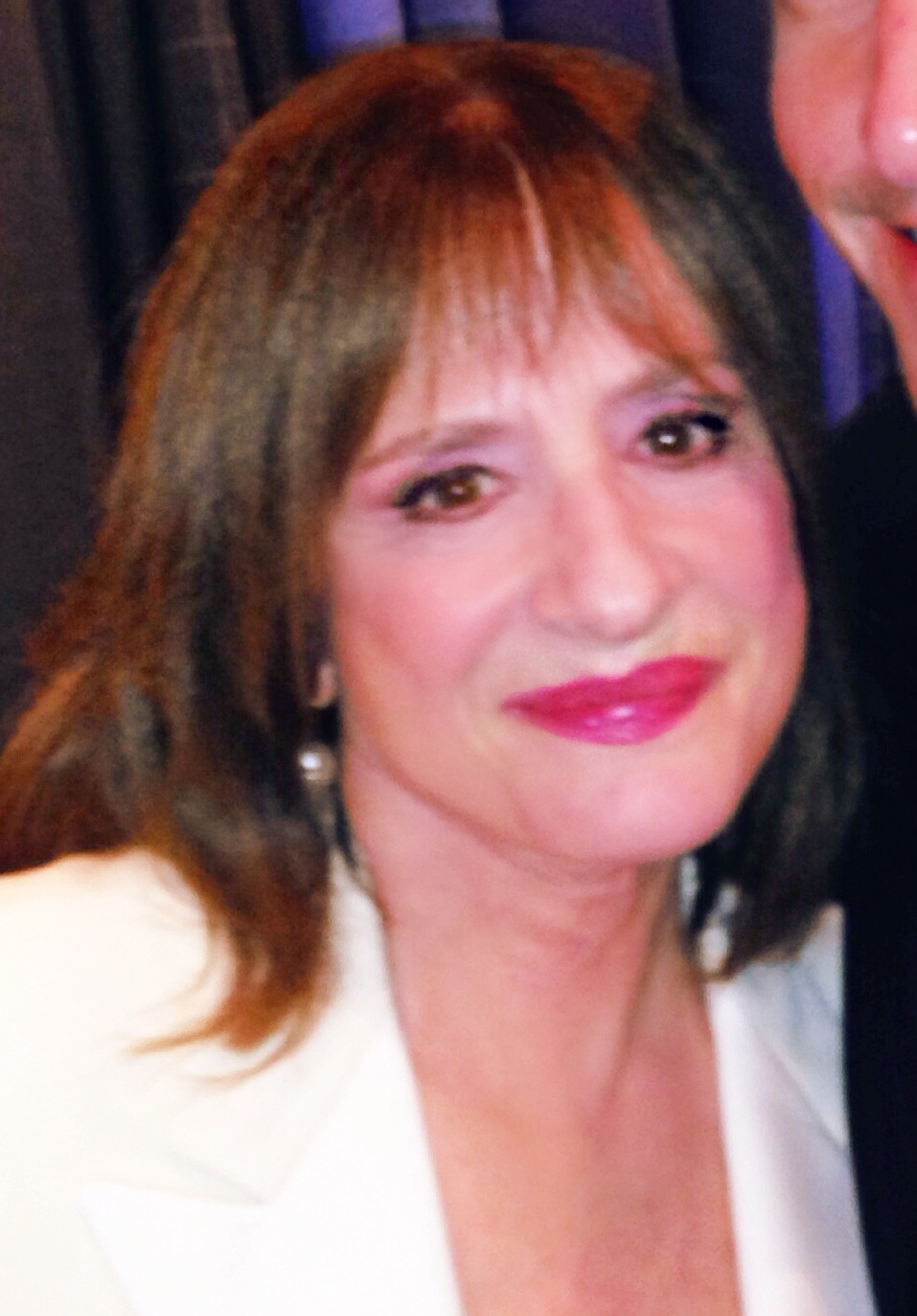
Patti LuPone, actress (GrDiP, 1972)

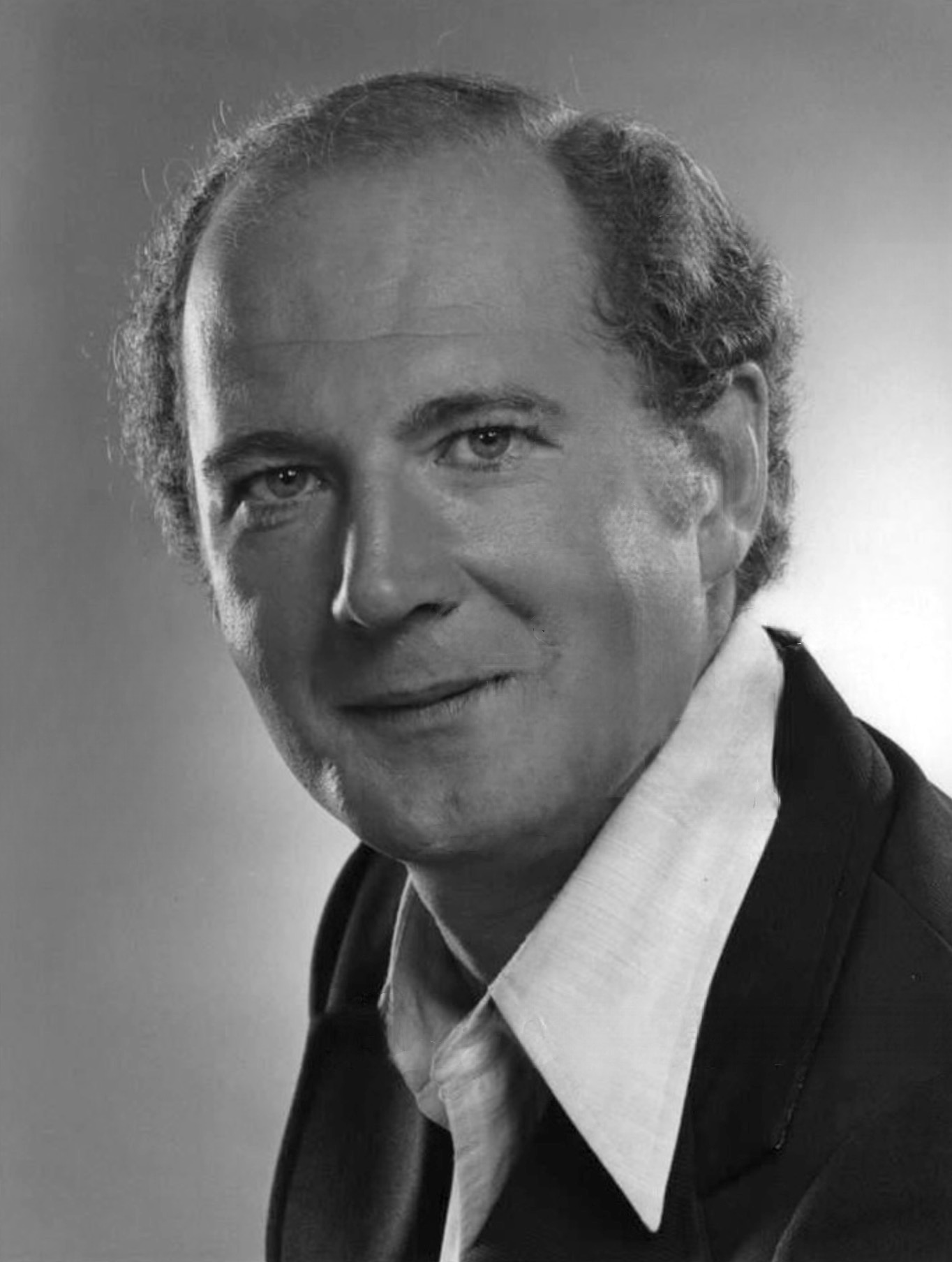
David Ogden Stiers, actor (graduated 1972)

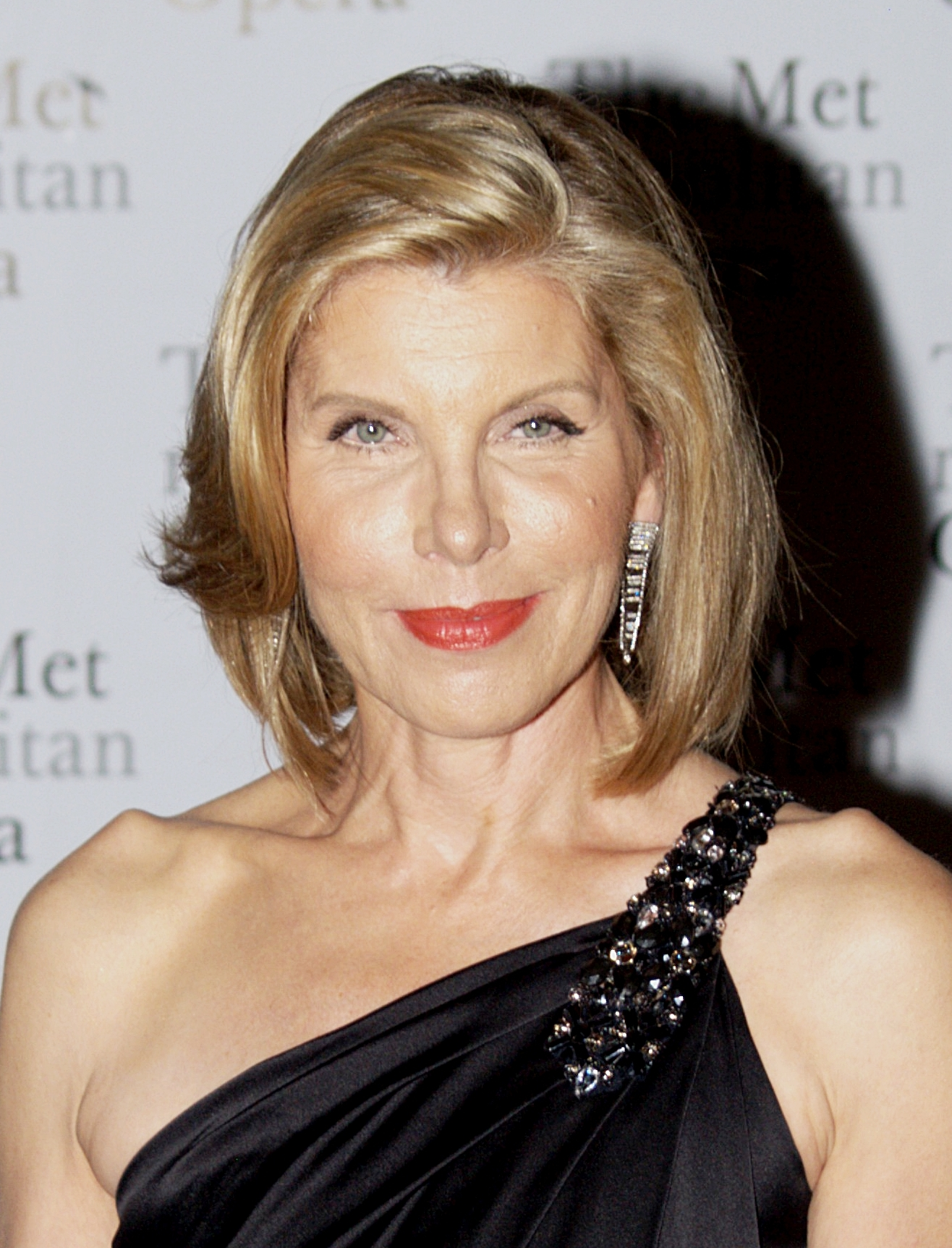
Christine Baranski, actress (BFA, 1974)

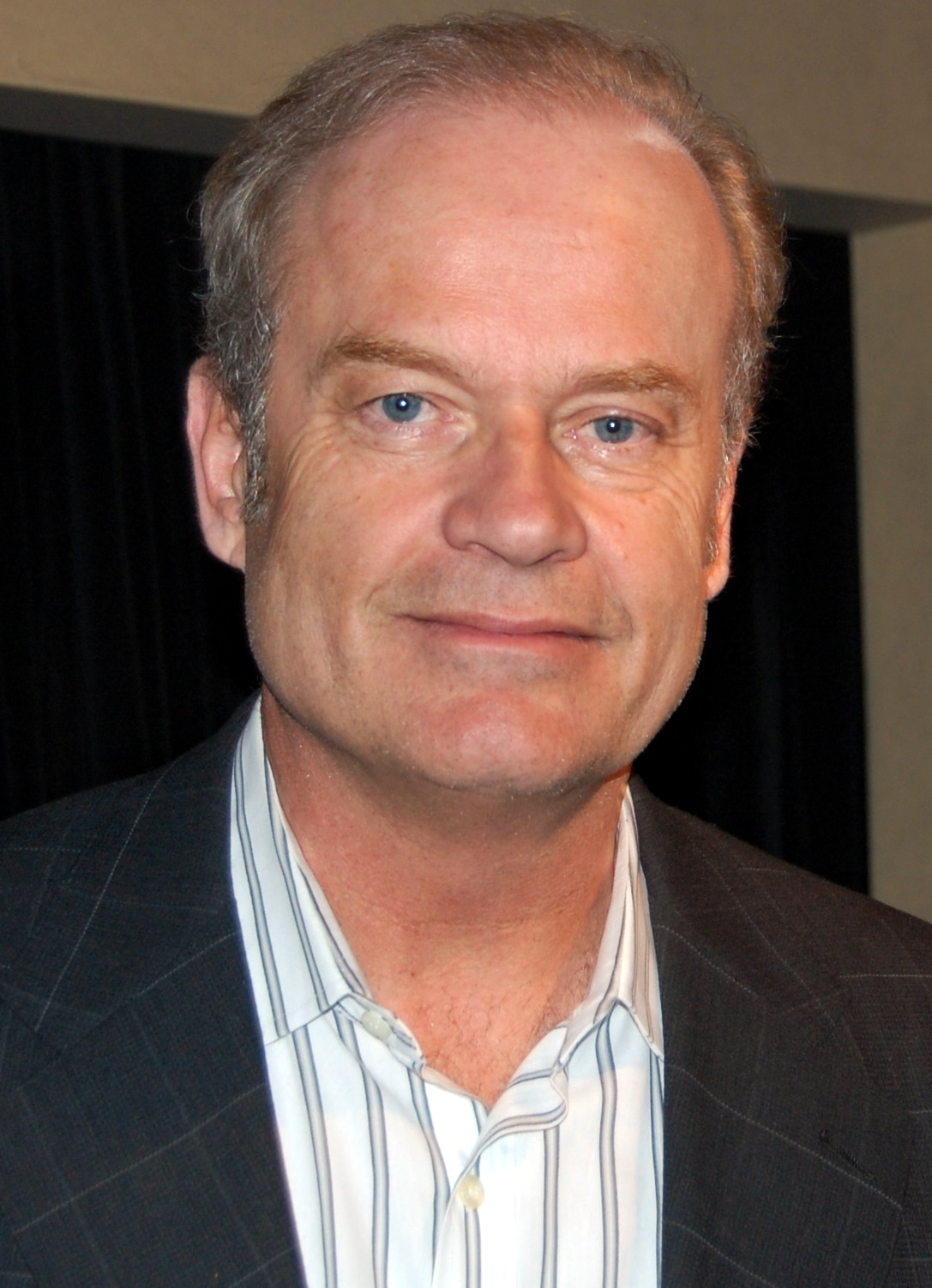
Kelsey Grammer, actor (1973–1975, left Juilliard)

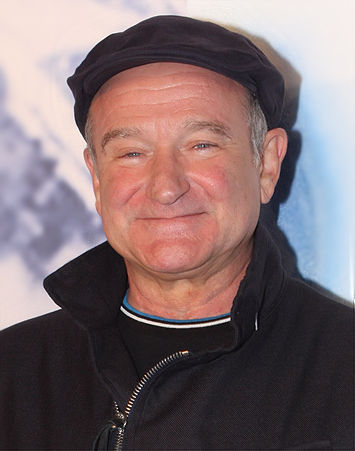
Robin Williams, comedian and actor (1973–1975, left Juilliard)

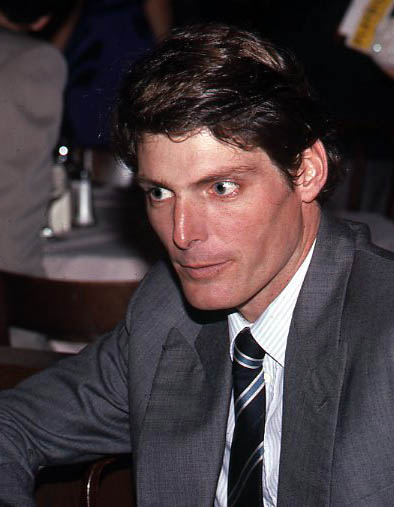
Christopher Reeve, actor, known for playing Superman (1973–1975, left Juilliard)

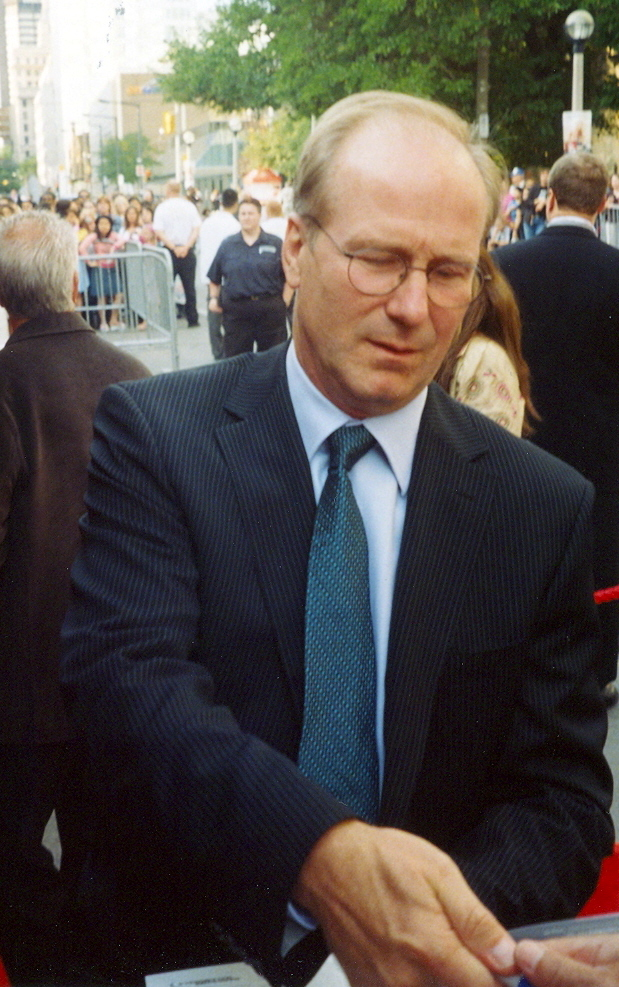
William Hurt, actor (GrDip, 1976)

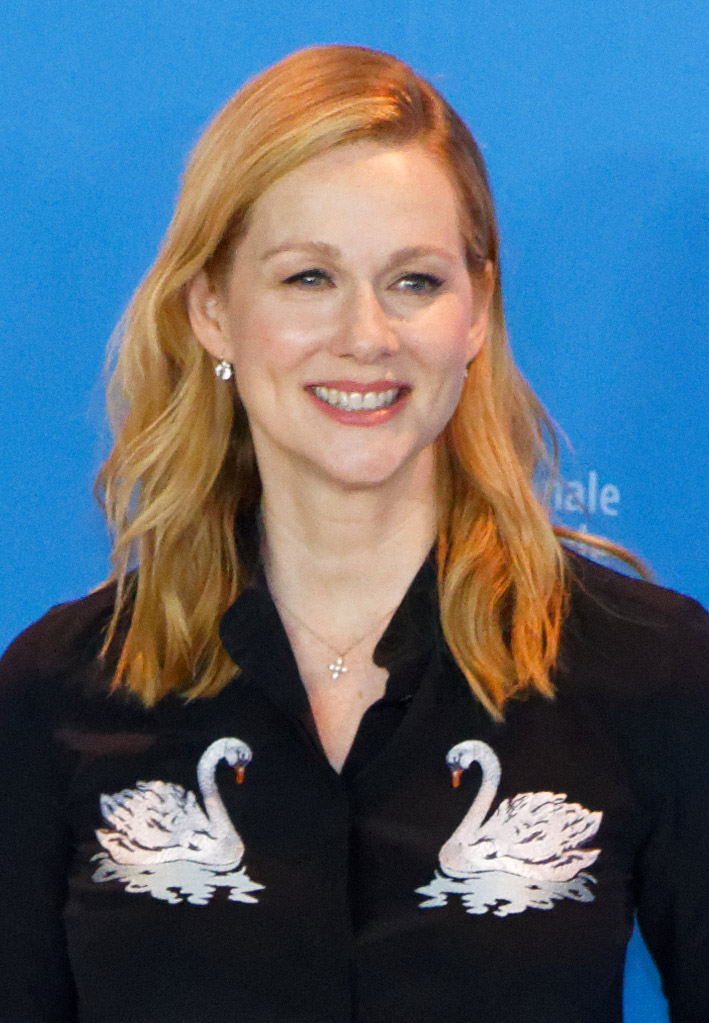
Laura Linney, actress (graduated 1990)

Jeanne Tripplehorn, actress (graduated 1990)

=== Faculty ===
Juilliard has over 350 college faculty members. Present and past faculty have included Pulitzer Prize, Presidential Medal of Freedom and Grammy Lifetime Achievement Award recipients, as well as members of the American Academy of Arts and Sciences and the American Philosophical Society. Since Peter Mennin's presidency, the school regularly offers master classes with various professional artists and its own faculty members. Past guest artists for these classes have included Leonard Bernstein, Herbert von Karajan, Arthur Rubinstein, Maria Callas, Luciano Pavarotti, Murray Perahia, András Schiff, Joyce DiDonato, Yannick Nézet-Séguin, Renée Fleming, Robert Levin, and Steven Isserlis, among others.

Notable present and past Juilliard faculty include:

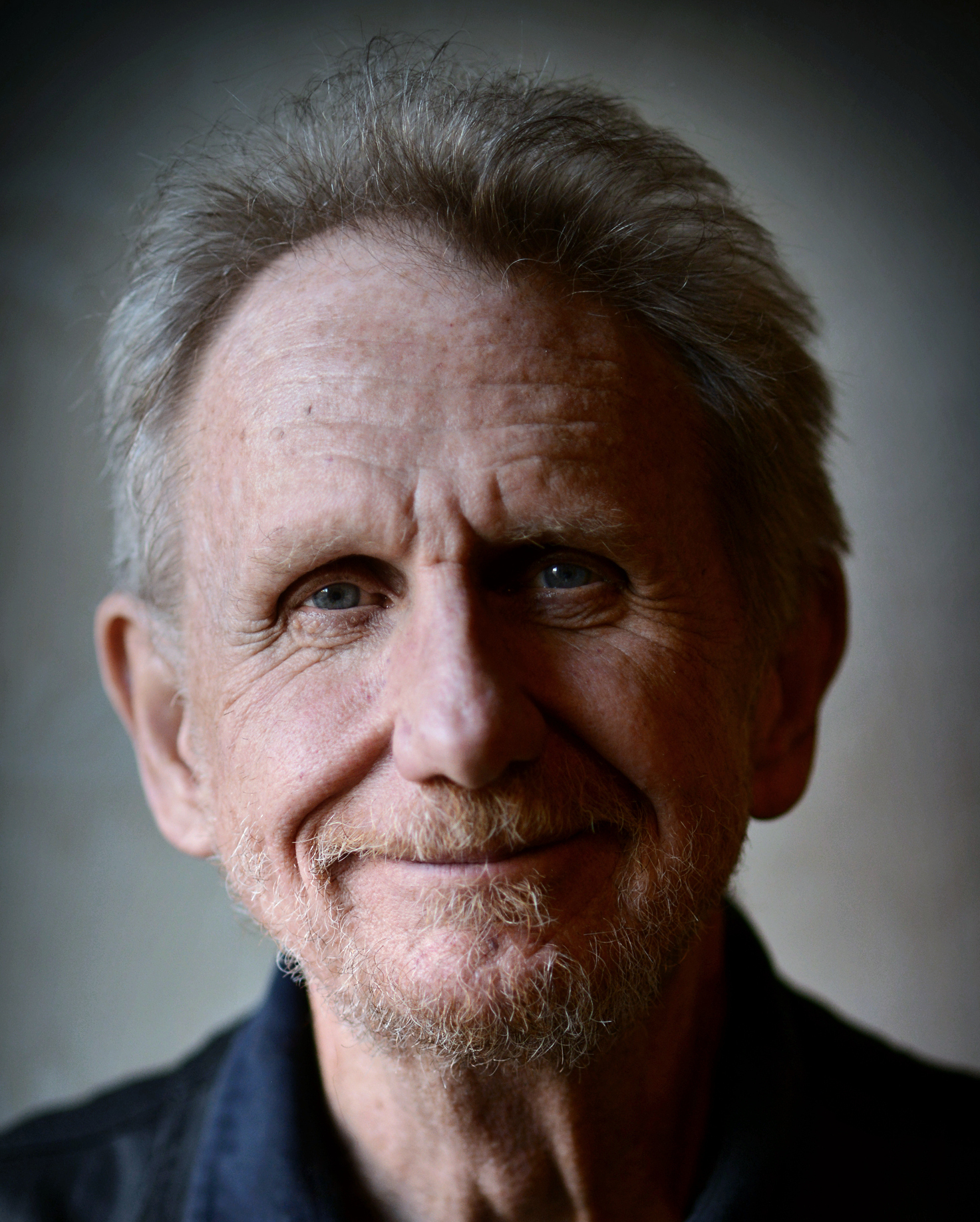
René Auberjonois

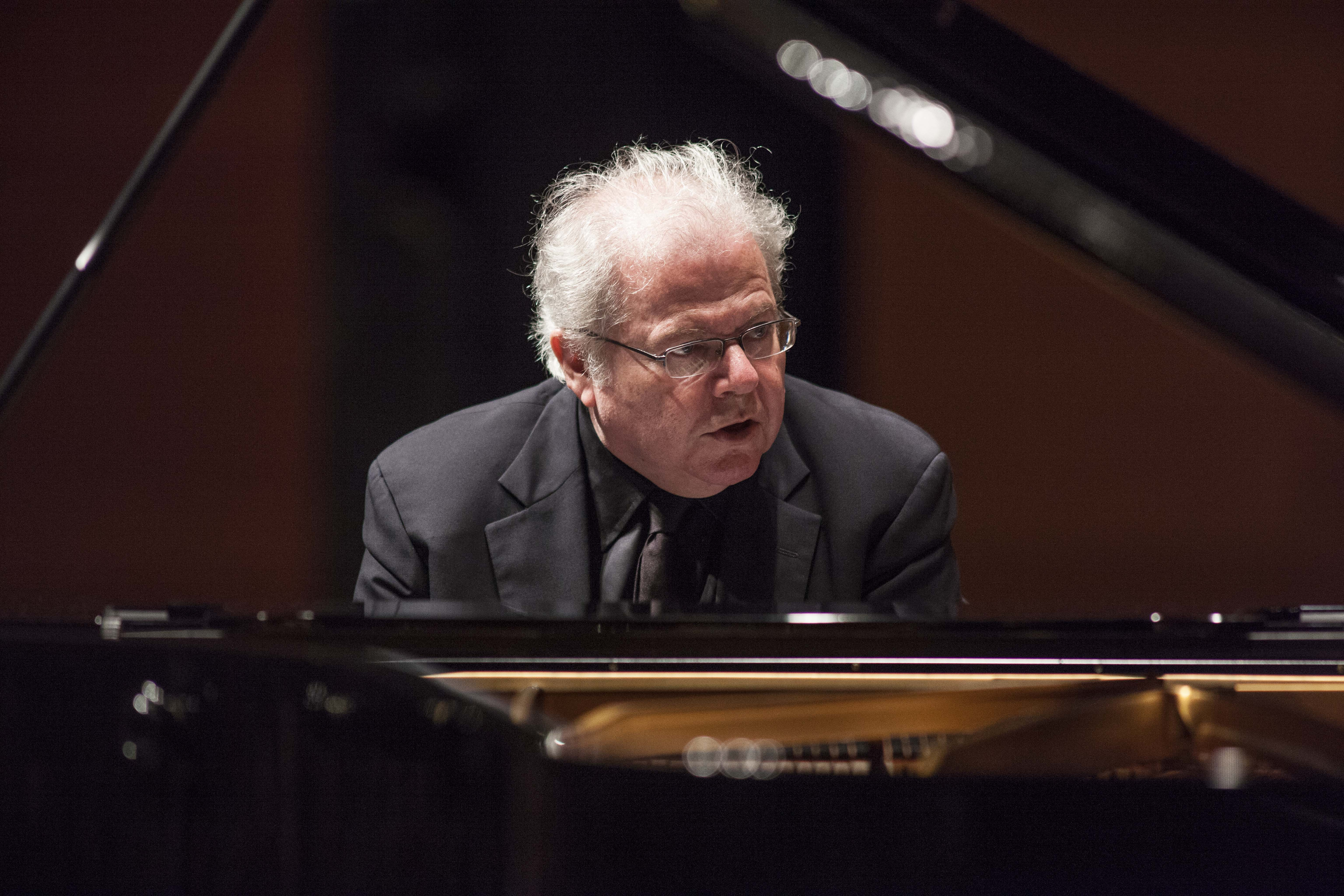
Emanuel Ax (Pre-College 1966; BM, 1970; MM, 1972)

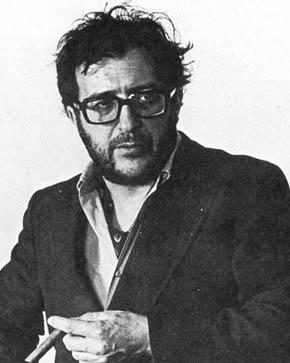
Luciano Berio

Elliott Carter

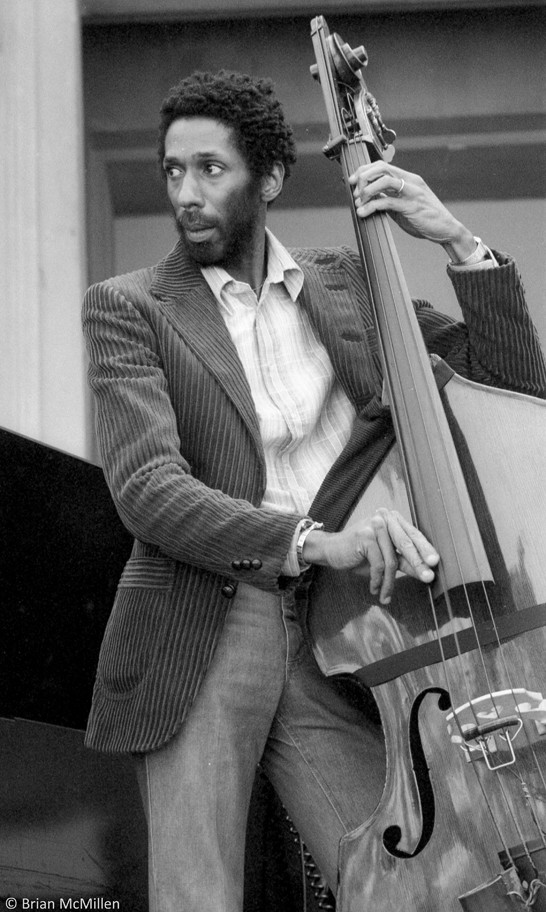
Ron Carter

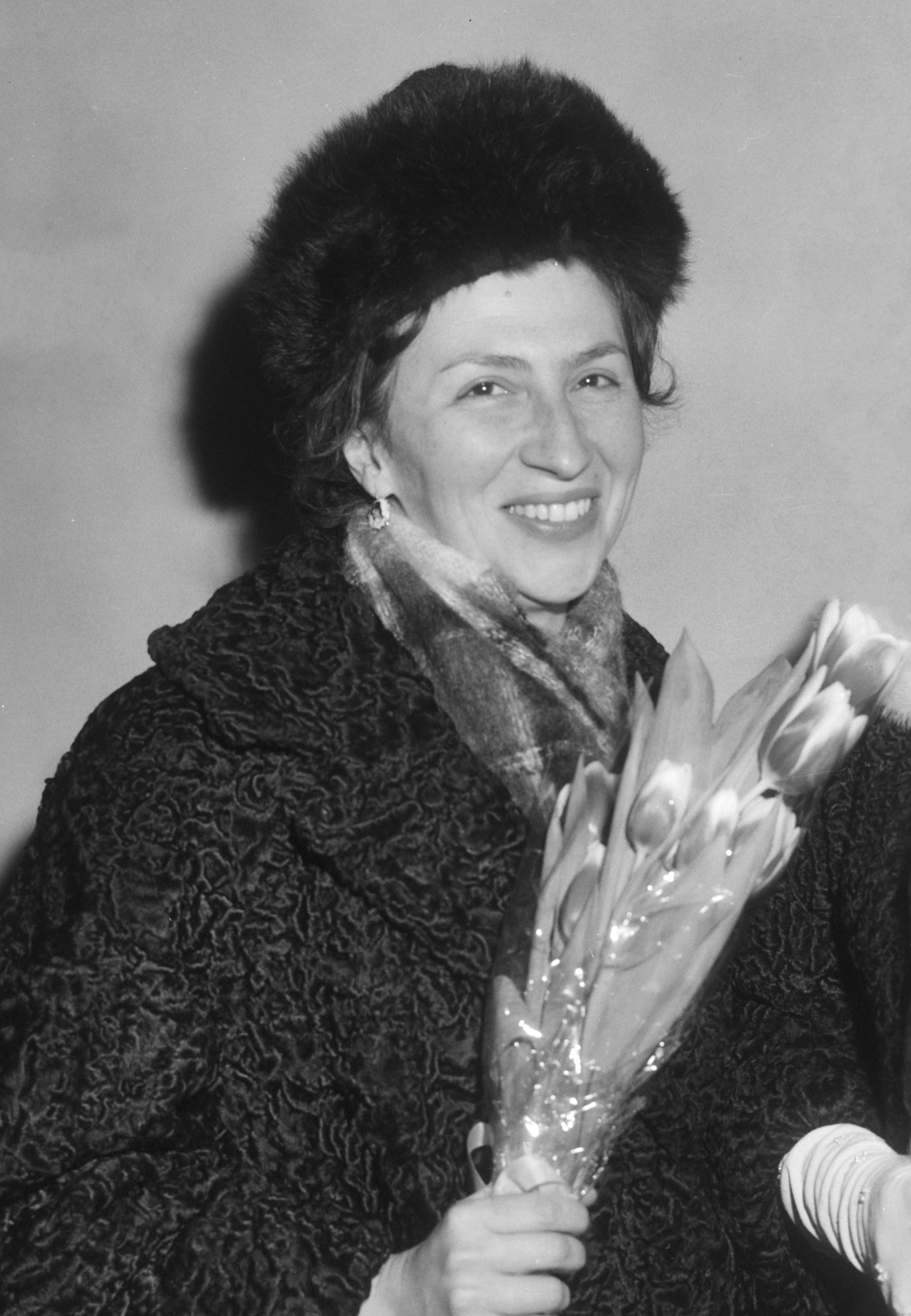
Bella Davidovich

Dorothy Delay

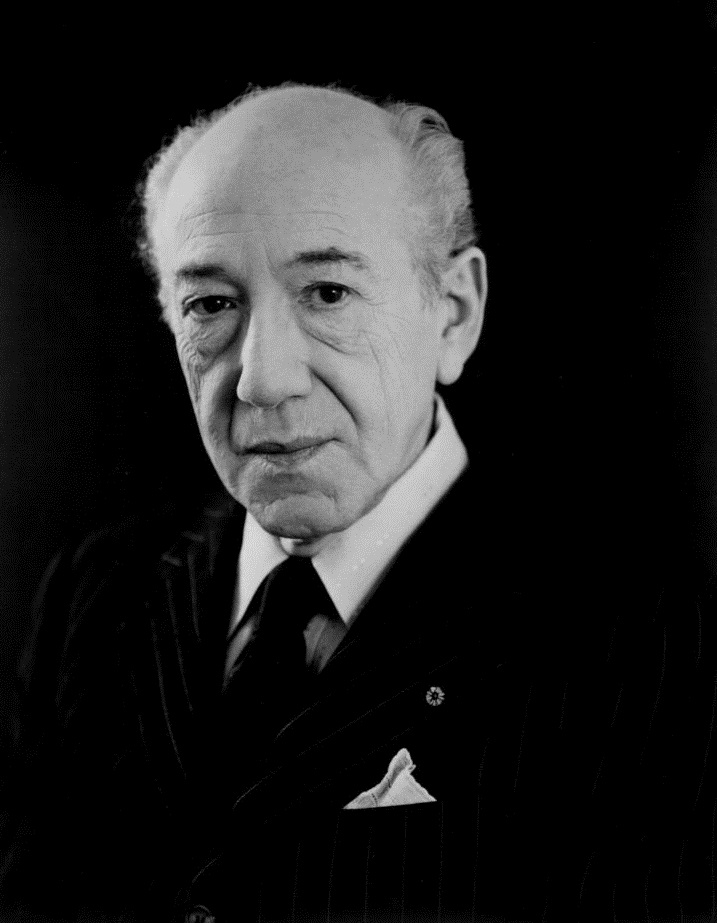
David Diamond

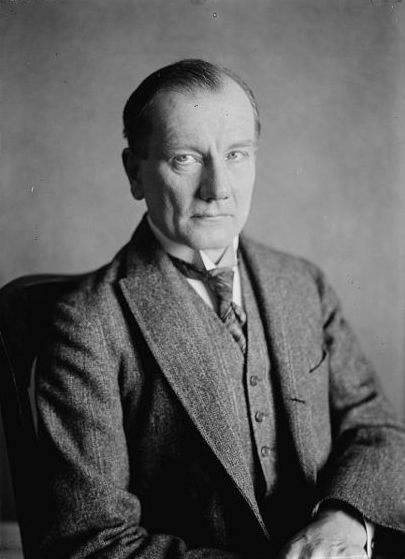
Ernst von Dohnányi

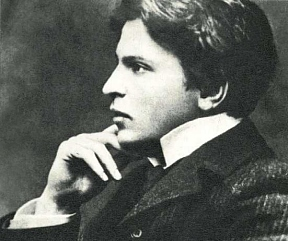
George Enescu

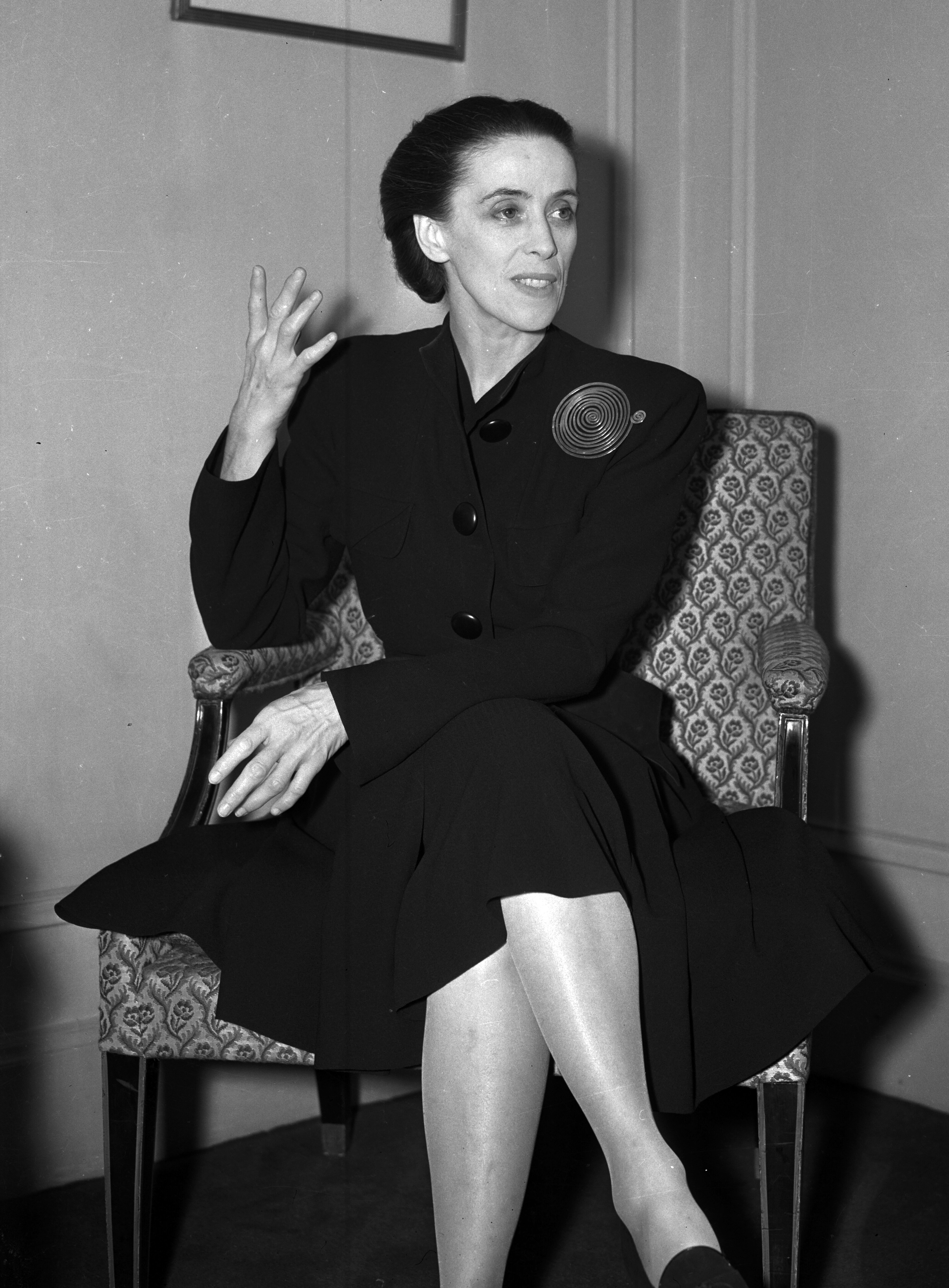
Martha Graham

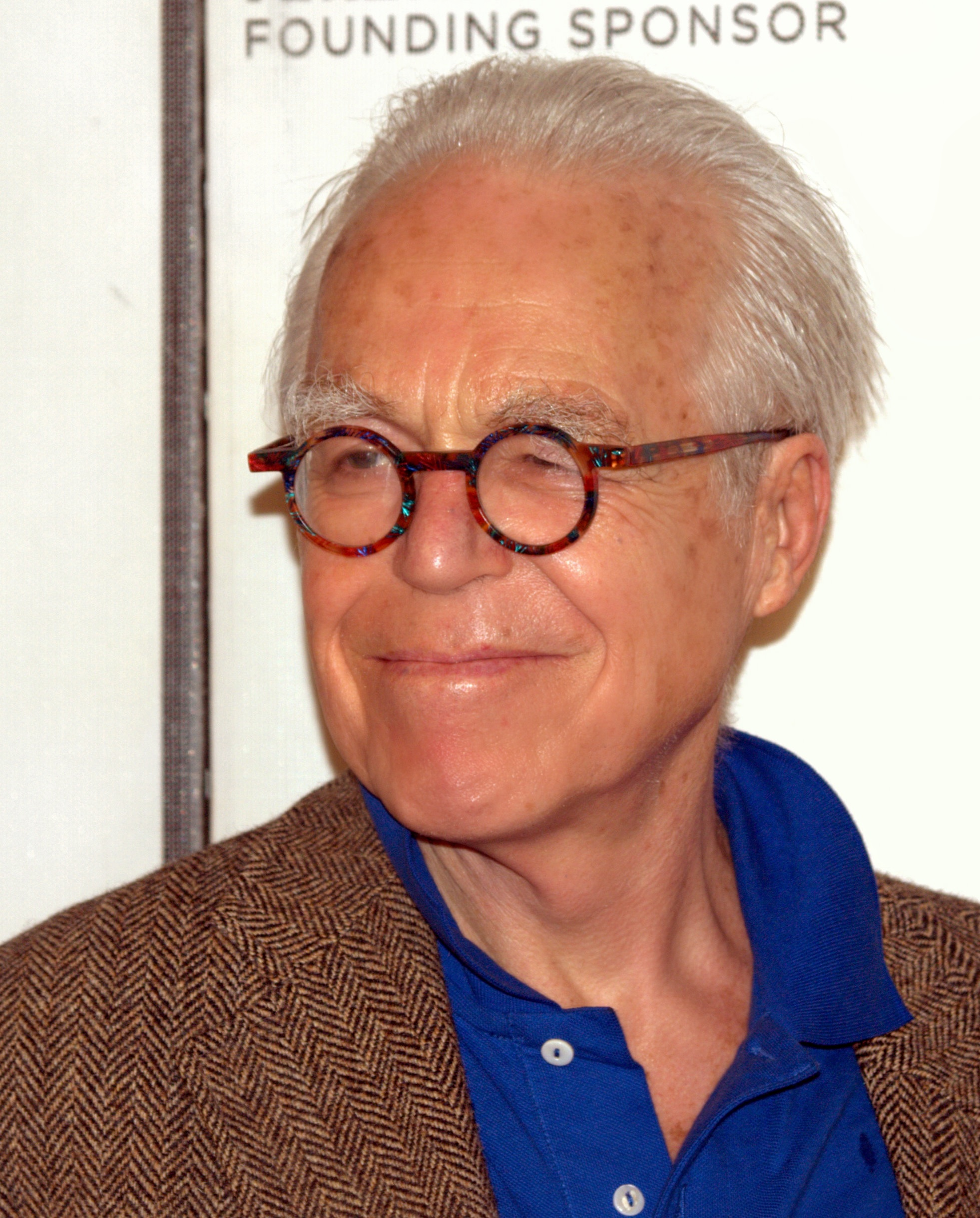
John Guare

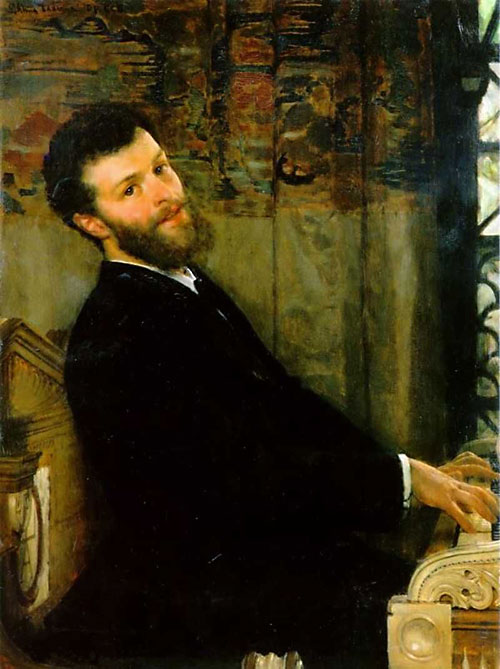
George Henschel

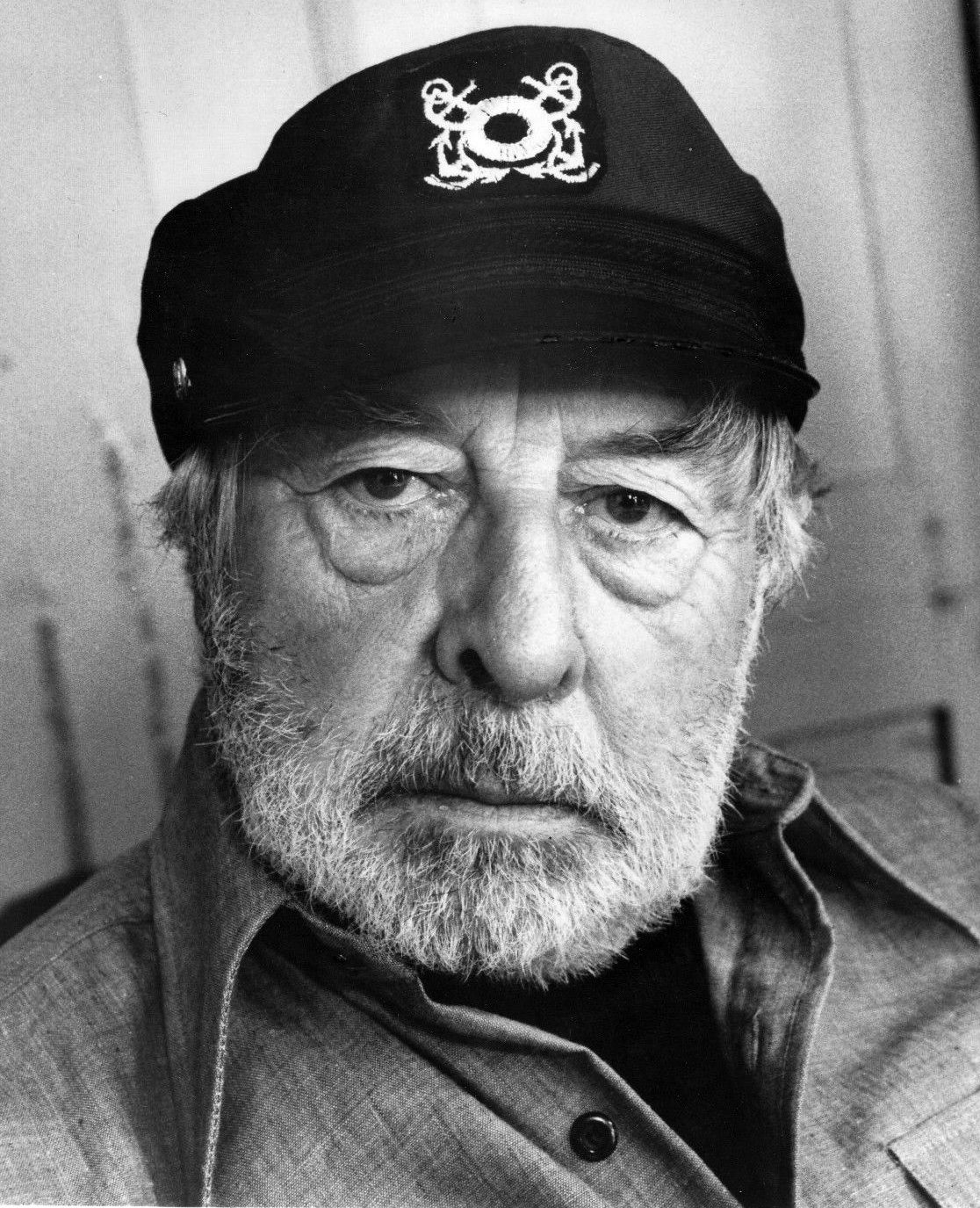
John Houseman

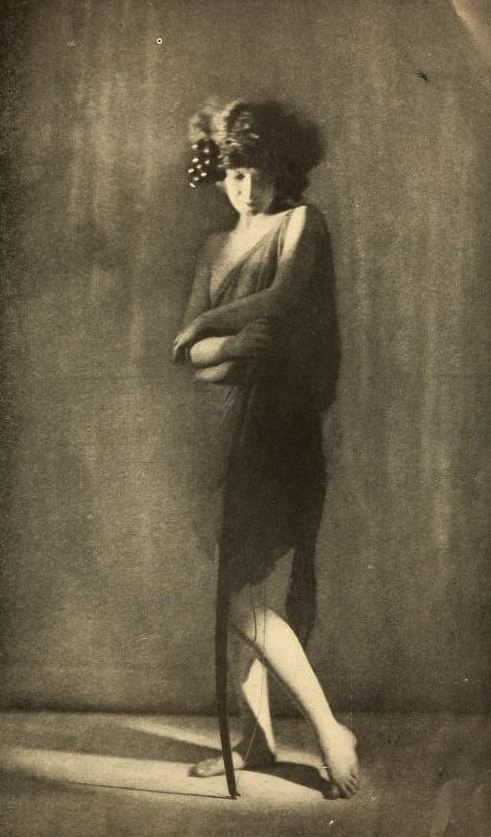
Doris Humphrey

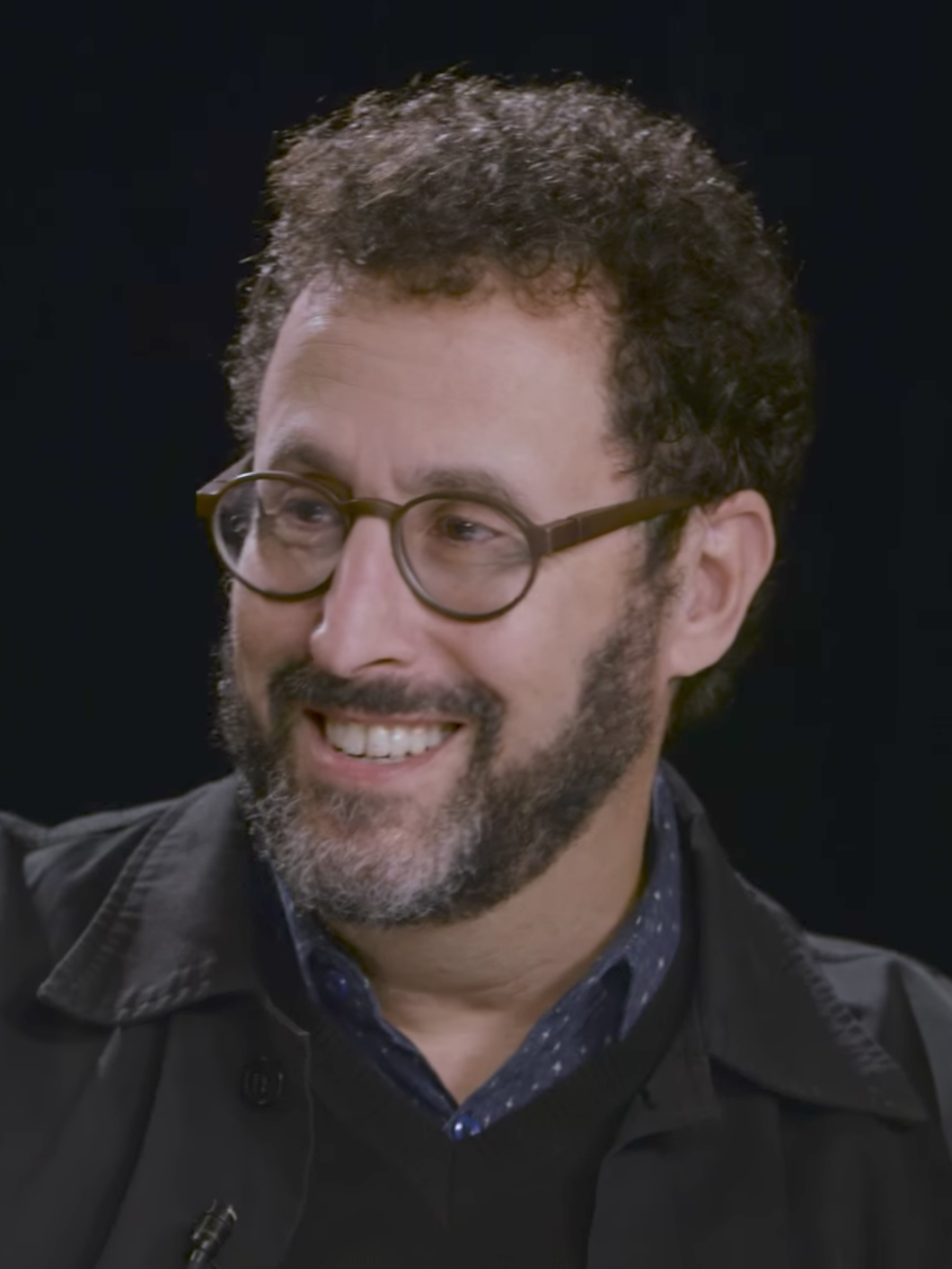
Tony Kushner

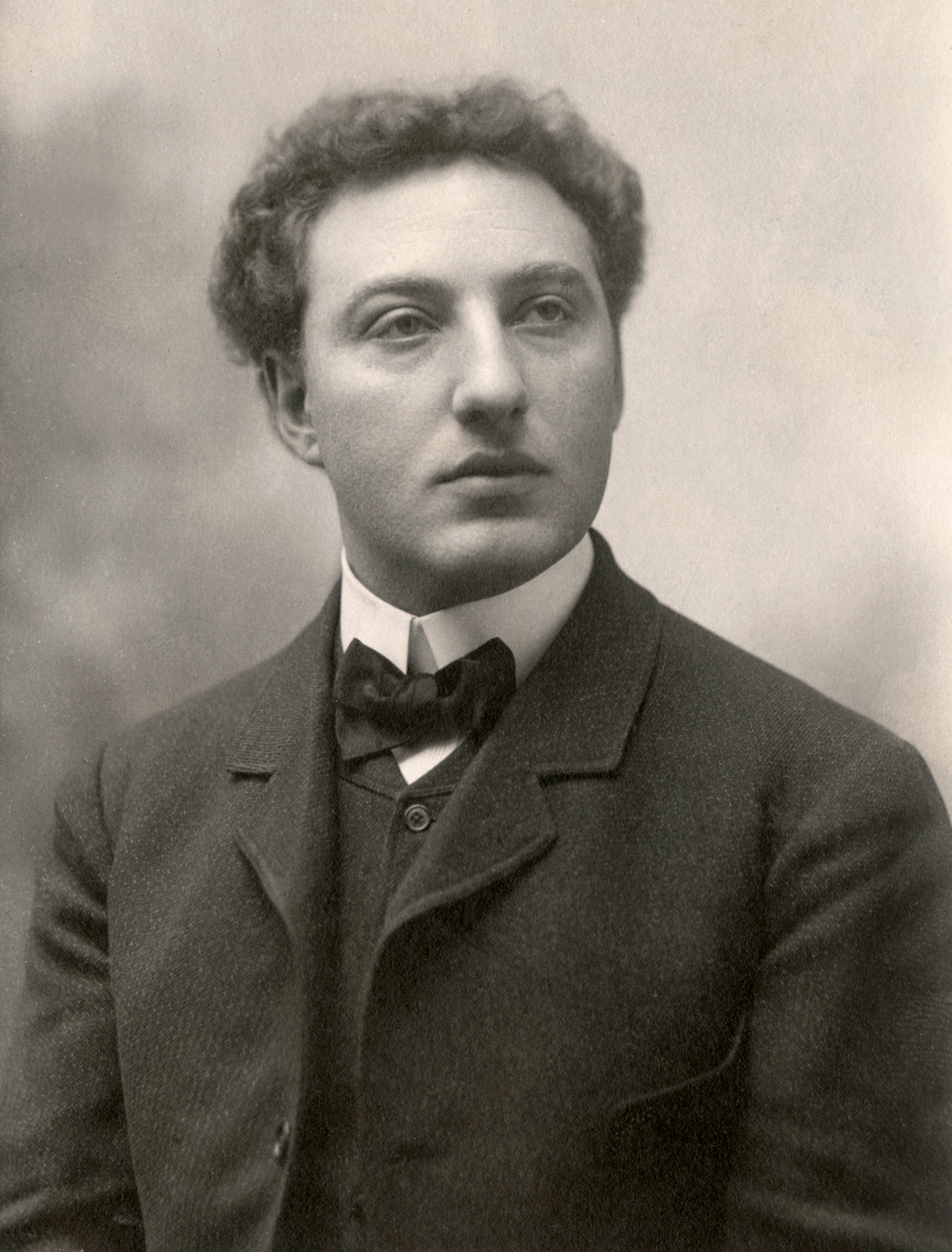
Josef Lhévinne

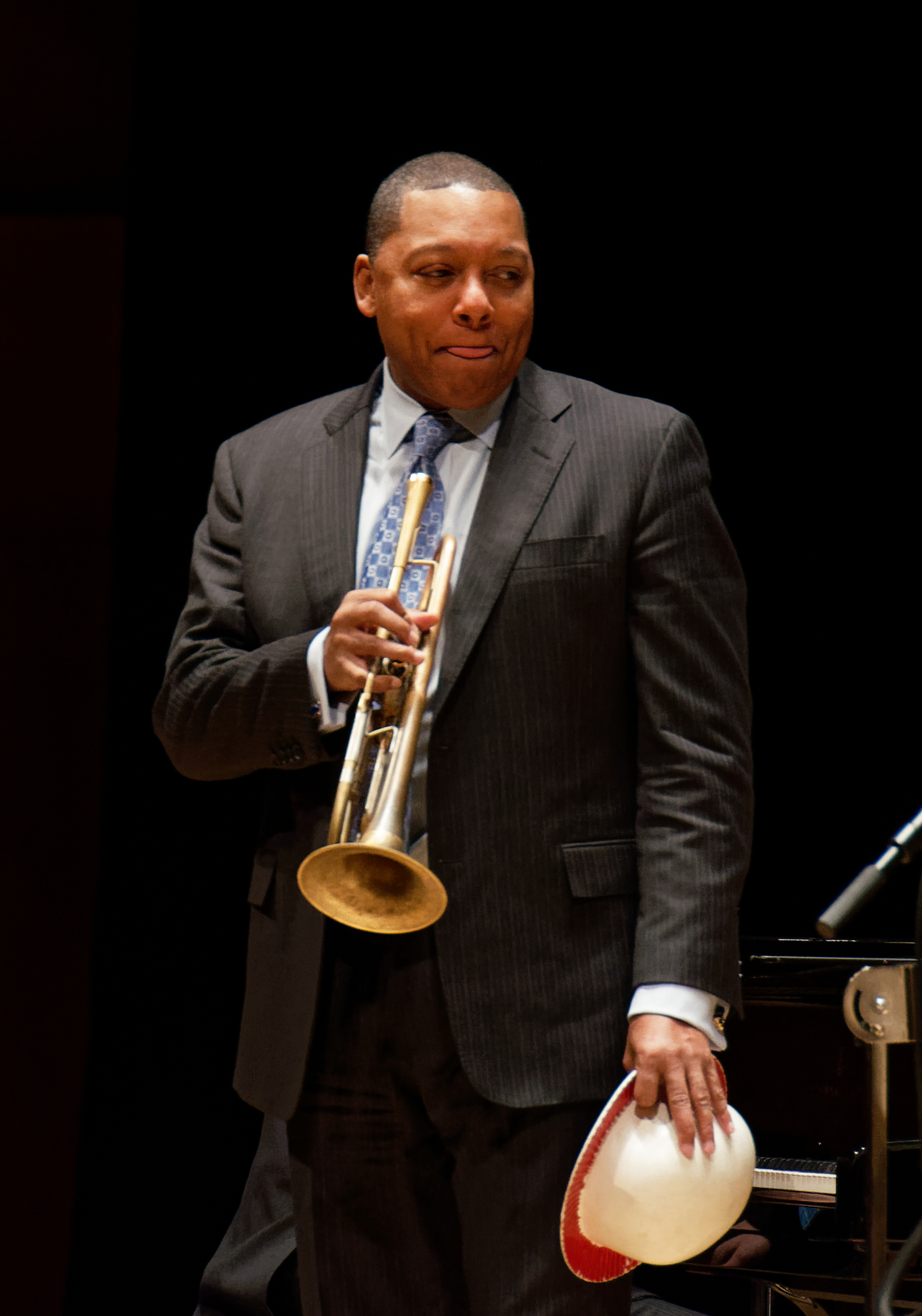
Wynton Marsalis, (BM, 1981)

Terrence McNally

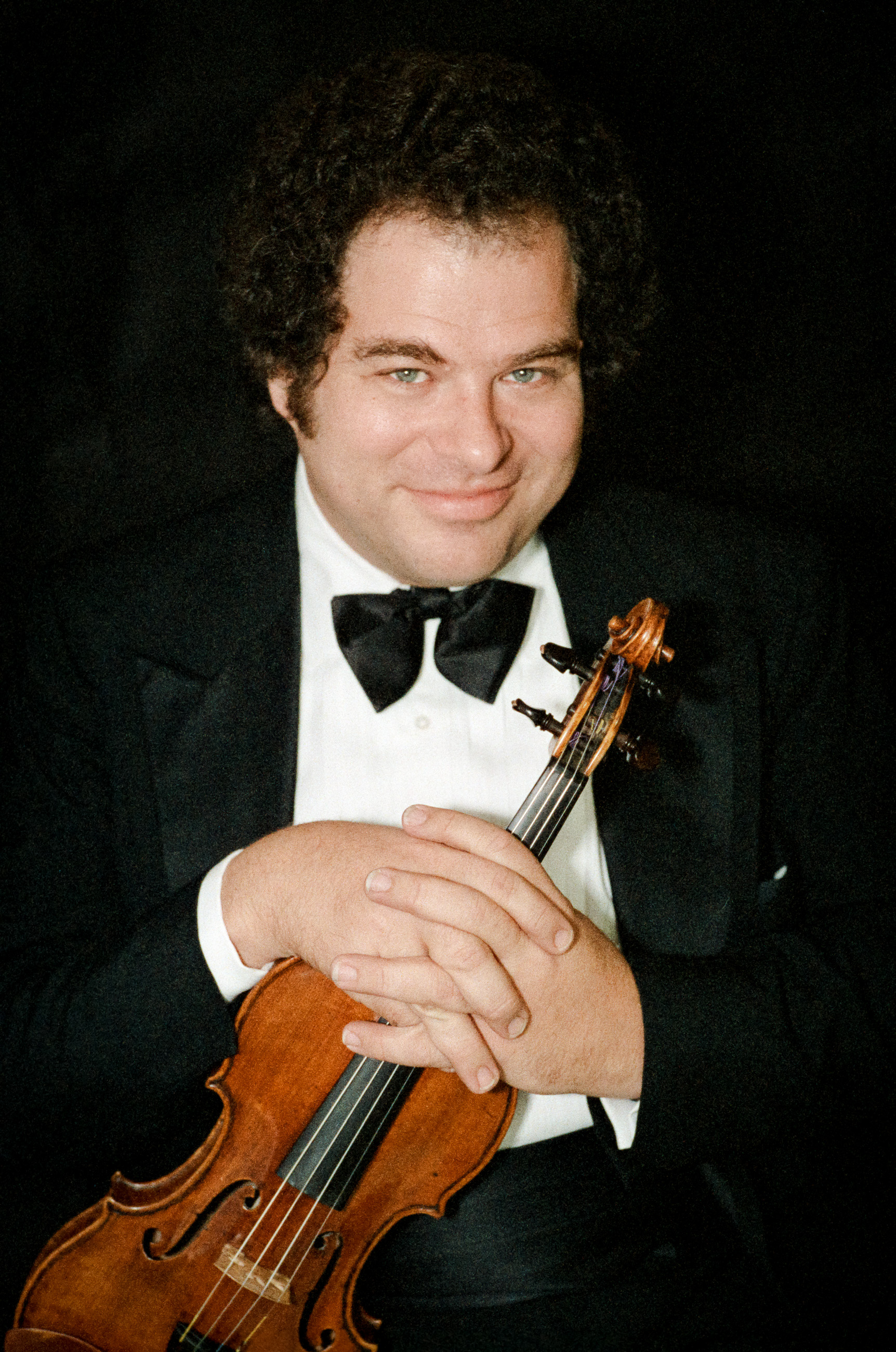
Itzhak Perlman

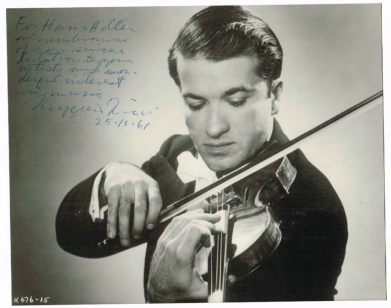
Ruggiero Ricci

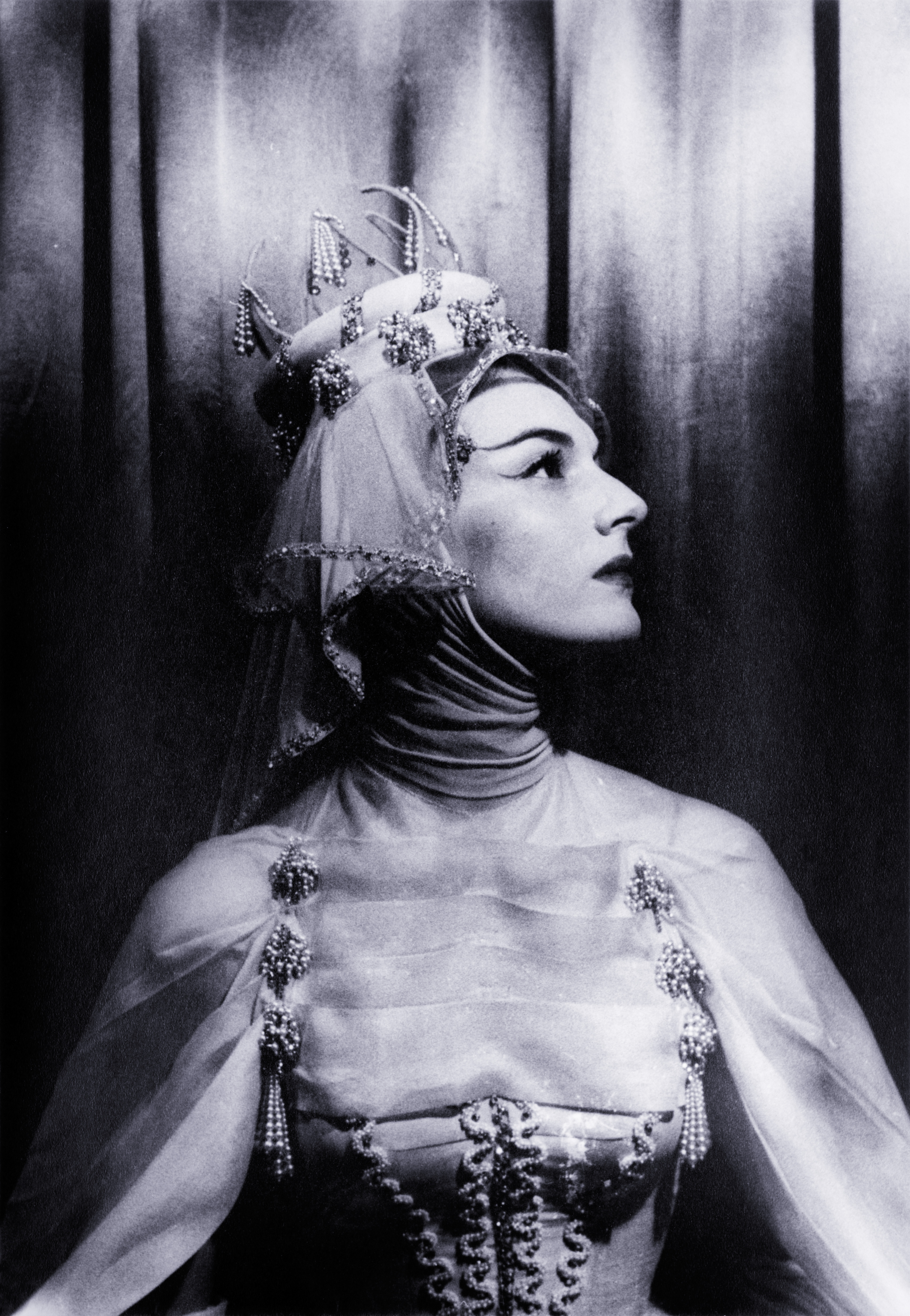
Marian Seldes

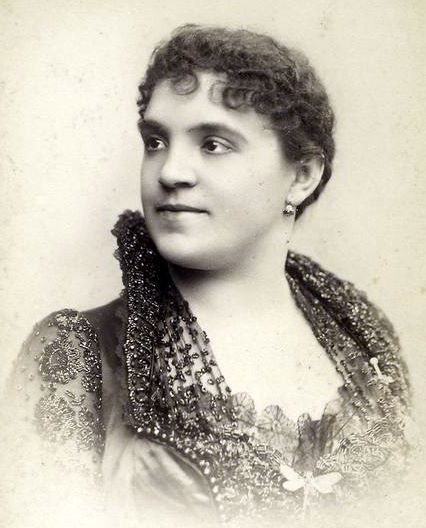
Marcella Sembrich

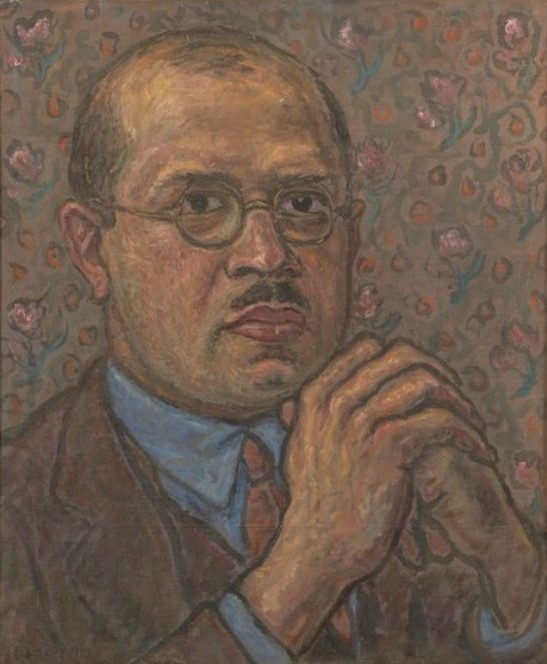
Roger Sessions

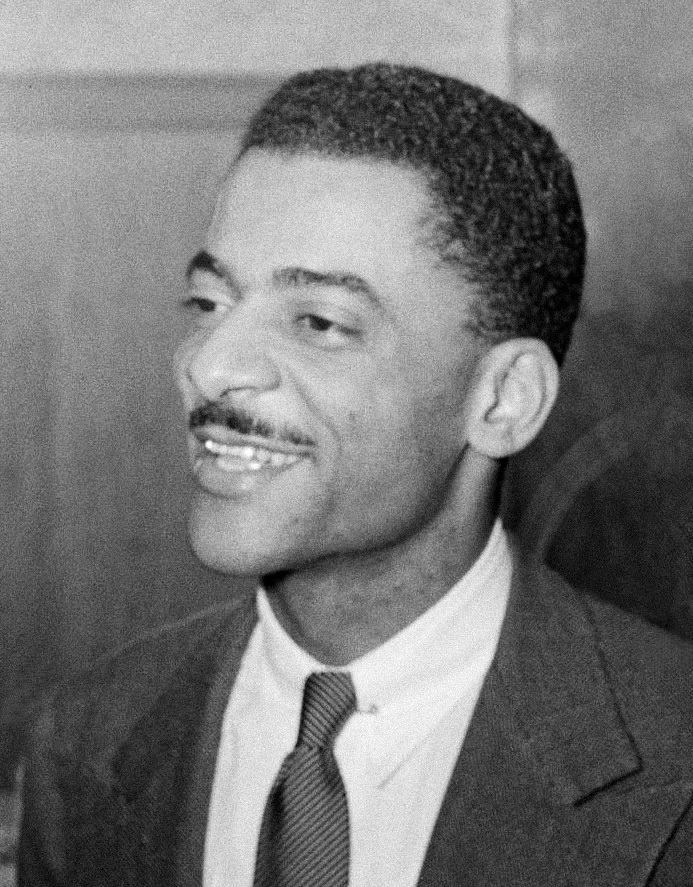
Teddy Wilson

== Notes and references ==
=== Sources ===
- Olmstead, Andrea (1999). Juilliard: A History. University of Illinois Press. ISBN 0-252-07106-9.
