= List of compositions by P. D. Q. Bach =

The following is a list of works by P. D. Q. Bach, a fictitious Bach family member, the alter ego of composer Peter Schickele. The first section lists, in alphabetical order, those works which have been recorded, are listed in the annotated catalogue of P. D. Q. Bach music in The Definitive Biography of P.D.Q. Bach, and/or are listed on the Theodore Presser website. "Schickele numbers", or "S." numbers, associated with most of the compositions, have been assigned arbitrarily (with humorous intent) and are not intended to provide the same service as Bach-Werke-Verzeichnis (BWV) numbers, also known, especially in early compilations, as "Schmieder numbers" or "S. numbers" after compiler Wolfgang Schmieder. The second section lists "undiscovered works" that are mentioned in The Definitive Biography. The third section lists works by Schickele that have appeared on P. D. Q. Bach recordings. The fourth section lists a few selections, not by P.D Q. Bach/Schickele, that have appeared on P. D. Q. Bach recordings.

== The works of P. D. Q. Bach ==
- 1712 Overture, S. 1712
- The Abduction of Figaro, a simply grand opera in three acts, S. 384, 492
- Allegretto Gabinetto for Plumber and Keyboarder, S. 2nd Door on the Left
- The Art of the Ground Round, S. 1.19/lb
- Birthday Ode to "Big Daddy" Bach, S. 100
- Breakfast Antiphonies, S. 8:30
- Canine Cantata: Wachet, Arf! (Sleeping Dogs, Awake!), S. K9
- Cantata: Blaues Gras (Bluegrass Cantata), S. 6 string
- Cantata: Iphigenia in Brooklyn, S. 53,162
- Cantata Singalonga: Meloir Cave Canem (Better Watch Out for the Dog), S. MCC
- Canzon Per Sonar a Sei – Count Them – Sei, S. 6
- Canzonetta La Hooplina (The Girl from Hoople), S. 16 going on 30
- Capriccio "La Pucelle de New Orleans" (The Maid of New Orleans), S. under 18
- Chorale Prelude: "Ah", S. 1636
- Chorale Prelude: "Should", S. 365
- Classical Rap, S. 1–2–3
- Concerto for Bassoon vs. Orchestra, S. 8′
- Concerto for Horn and Hardart, S. 27
- Concerto for Piano vs. Orchestra, S. 88
- Concerto for Simply Grand Piano and Orchestra, S. 99%
- Concerto for Two Pianos vs. Orchestra, S. 2 are better than one
- A Consort of Choral Christmas Carols, S. 359 (I. Throw the Yule Log On, Uncle John; II. O Little Town of Hackensack; III. Good King Kong Looked Out)
- Diverse Ayres on Sundrie Notions, S. 99 44/100
- "Dutch" Suite in G major, S. −16
- Echo Sonata for Two Unfriendly Groups of Instruments, S. 9999999
- Eine Kleine Kiddiemusik for Three Toyists and Orchestra, S. One-Potato-Two-Potato-Three-Potato-Four
- "Erotica" Variations" for banned instruments and piano, S. 36EE
- Fanfare for Fred, S. F4F
- Fanfare for the Common Cold, S. 98.7
- Fantasieshtick, S. 1001
- Four Curmudgeonly Canons, S. 365
- Four Folk Song Upsettings, S. 4
- Four Next-to-Last Songs, S. Ω – 1
- Fugue of the Volga Boatmen, S. 1-2-3-grunt
- Goldbrick Variations, S. 14
- Gott Sei Dank, Dass Heute Freitag Ist
- Grand Serenade for an Awful Lot of Winds and Percussion, S. 1000
- Gross Concerto No. 1 for divers flutes, two trumpets, and strings, S. −2
- Gross Concerto No. 2 for flutoid instruments and orchestra, S. −1
- Hansel and Gretel and Ted and Alice, an opera in one unnatural act, S. 2^{n}−1
- Here I Am
- Here’s to the OK Mozart Festival
- Hindenburg Concerto, S. Lz 129
- Hoarse Trojan, a lost opera, S. One Size Fits All
- "Howdy" Symphony in D major, S. 6 7/8
- Knock, Knock, choral cantata, S. 4/1
- Konzertschtick for Two Violins Mit Orchestra, S. 2+
- Liebeslieder Polkas for mixed chorus and piano five hands, S. 2/4
- Lip My Reeds, S. 32'
- A Little Nightmare Music, an opera in one irrevocable act, S. 35
- Little Notebook for "Piggy" Bach
- Little Pickle Book (Pöckelbüchlein) for theater organ and dill piccolos, S. 6
- Long Live the King, S. 1789
- The Magic Bassoon, a tragicommodity in one act, S. 7
- March of the Cute Little Wood Sprites, S. Onesy Twosy
- The Mary Variations
- Minuet Militaire, S. 1A
- Missa Hilarious, S. N_{2}0
- The Mule
- The Musical Sacrifice, S. 50% off
- No-no Nonette, for assorted winds and toys, S. 86
- Notebook for Betty-Sue Bach, S. 13 going on 14
- Octoot, for wind instruments, S. 8
- Oedipus Tex, opera/dramatic oratorio, S. 150
- The Only Piece Ever Written for Violin and Tuba, S. 9, 10, big fat hen
- O Serpent
- Oratorio: The Seasonings, S. 1/2 tsp.
- Overture to La clemenza di Genghis Khan, S. 1227
- Perückenstück (Hair Piece) from The Civilian Barber, S. 4F
- Pervertimento for Bagpipes, Bicycle and Balloons, S. 66
- The Preachers of Crimetheus, a ballet in one selfless act, S. 988
- Prelude to Einstein on the Fritz, S. e=mt^{2}
- Rounds for Squares, S. 0^{2}
- Royal Firewater Musick, for bottles and orchestra, S. 1/5
- "Safe" Sextet, S. R33–L45–R(pass it once)78
- The "Sanka" Cantata
- Schleptet in E♭ major, S. 0
- Serenude, for devious instruments, S. 36–24–36
- Shepherd on the Rocks with a Twist, S. 12 to 1
- The Short-Tempered Clavier, Preludes and Fugues in All the Major and Minor Keys Except for the Really Hard Ones, S. easy as 3.14159265
- Sinfonia Concertante, S. 98.6
- Six Contrary Dances, S. 39
- Sonata "Abassoonata", S. 888
- Sonata Da Circo ("Circus Sonata") for steam calliope, S. 3 ring
- Sonata for Viola Four Hands and Harpsichord, S. 440
- Sonata in D major for Piano “Walled Stein”
- Sonata Innamorata, S. 1 + 1
- Sonata Piccola, S. 8va
- The Stoned Guest, a half-act opera, S. 86 proof
- String Quartet in F major "The Moose", S. Y2K
- Suite from The Civilian Barber, S. 4F
- Suite No. 1 for Cello All By Its Lonesome, S. 1a
- Suite No. 2 for Cello All By Its Lonesome, S. 1b
- Tell Me
- Three Chorale-Based Piecelets for organ, S. III
- Three-Step Crab Dinner
- Three Teeny Preludes, S. 001
- Toot Suite for calliope four hands, S. 212°
- Traumarei for unaccompanied piano, S. 13
- Trio (sic) Sonata, S. 3(4)
- The "Trite" Quintet, S. 6 of 1, Half a Dozen of the Other
- Twelve Quite Heavenly Songs ("Aire Proprio Zodicale"), S. 16°
- Two and a Half Variations on In Dulci Jubilo
- Two Hearts, Four Lips, Three Little Words, S. 9
- Two Madrigals from The Triumphs of Thusnelda, S. 1601 (1. The Queen to Me a Royal Pain Doth Give; 2. My Bonnie Lass She Smelleth)
- A Veritable Paean of Praise
- Variations on an Unusually Simple-Minded Theme, S. 1

== The "undiscovered" works of P. D. Q. Bach ==
- The Barren Gypsy
- The Civilian Barber
- The Dairy Queen
- Einstein on the Fritz
- Famous Last Words of Christ
- Half-Nelson Mass
- Madame Butterbrickle
- The Magic Fruit
- The Mass in the Allah Mode
- Neo-Trio Sonata
- The Passion According to Hoyle
- Rosenkavalier and Guildenstern

== Works by Peter Schickele appearing on P. D. Q. Bach recordings ==
- Bach Portrait
- Chaconne à son Goût
- Eine Kleine Nichtmusik
- Last Tango in Bayreuth
- Quodlibet
- "Unbegun" Symphony

== Other works featured on P. D. Q. Bach recordings ==
- Symphony No. 5 in C Minor, 1st Movement by Ludwig van Beethoven - as if it were a sports commentary (New Horizons in Music Appreciation)
- What's My Melodic Line? (featuring works by Archangelo Spumoni, another fictitious composer)
- Canon In D Major by Johann Pachelbel, arranged for Renaissance consort

=== By Leiber & Stoller ===
- Hound Dog
- Love Me

== Sources ==
- The recordings of P. D. Q. Bach
- As listed in The Definitive Biography of P.D.Q. Bach by Prof. Peter Schickele (Random House: New York, 1976)
- As listed on the Theodore Presser Company website (Note: some of these may be works by Prof. Schickele and not by P.D.Q. Bach. The website is not clear who wrote some of the pieces.)
