= The Dreaded P. D. Q. Bach Collection =

Compilation album by P. D. Q. Bach
- Released: 1996
- Genre: Classical; Comedy
- Label: Vanguard Records

P. D. Q. Bach chronology
The Short-Tempered Clavier and other dysfunctional works for keyboard (1995)	The Dreaded P. D. Q. Bach Collection (1996)	The Ill-Conceived P. D. Q. Bach Anthology (1998)

The Dreaded P. D. Q. Bach Collection is a collection of works by Peter Schickele under the pseudonym of P. D. Q. Bach originally recorded on the Vanguard Records label by the composer. It includes the complete contents of the first five P. D. Q. Bach albums, plus the never-before-released "Sanka" Cantata.

== Track listing ==
Disc 1

- 1 In the Vanguard Vault, Part 1
- 2–19 Peter Schickele Presents an Evening with P. D. Q. Bach (1807–1742)?
- 20–31 An Hysteric Return: P.D.Q. Bach at Carnegie Hall

Disc 2

- 1–9 An Hysteric Return continued
- 10–33 Report from Hoople: P. D. Q. Bach on the Air

Disc 3

- 1–20 P. D. Q. Bach's Half-Act Opera, "The Stoned Guest"

Disc 4

- 1–29 The Intimate P. D. Q. Bach
- 30 In the Vanguard Vault, Part 2 (new track)
- 31 The "Sanka" Cantata (P.D.Q. Bach) (new track)
- 32 In the Vanguard Vault, Part 3 (new track)
