= Found a Peanut =

Traditional children's song

"Found a Peanut" is a folk song, often considered a children's song, in the United Kingdom, the United States, Australia, Canada, and Israel. In Israel it is titled "I Swallowed a Peanut" (Balati Boten; בלעתי בוטן). It is popular to sing when travelling, as it has a very repetitive format that is easy to memorize, and can take a long time to sing. It is sung to the tune of "Oh My Darling, Clementine". It may often be sung around a campfire.

== Basic lyrics ==
A basic version of the variable lyrics is:

Found a peanut, found a peanut, found a peanut just now.
Just now I found a peanut, found a peanut just now.

Cracked it open, cracked it open, cracked it open just now
Just now I cracked it open, cracked it open just now.

It was rotten, it was rotten, it was rotten just now,
Just now it was rotten, it was rotten just now.

Then it continues with the same rhythm:

Ate it anyway
Got a stomachache
Called the doctor
Said I wouldn't die
Died anyway
Went to Heaven
Found the gates locked
Got hotter
Woke up
Found it was a dream

== The Israeli/Hebrew version ==
I swallowed a peanut yesterday night
It was rotten
My tummy ached
I underwent surgery
It was unsuccessful
I ascended to heaven
Heaven was closed
I knocked at the door
Gabriel answered
He asked me: 'What happened?'
'I swallowed a peanut' ...

Balati boten etmol balayla
Hoo haya raqoov
Ka'ava li habeten
Assoo li nitoo'akh
Hoo lo hitsli'akh
Aliti l'gan eden
Hoo haya sagoor
Dafaqti badelet
Gavri'el patakh li
Sha'al ma kara li
'Balati boten'

בלעתי בוטן אתמול בלילה
הוא היה רקוב
כאבה לי הבטן
עשו לי ניתוח
הוא לא הצליח
עליתי ל'גן-עדן
הוא היה סגור
דפקתי בדלת
גבריאל פתח לי
שאל מה קרה לי
'בלעתי בוטן'

== Many variations ==
The simple repetitive structure of the song lends itself to near infinite variations. Sometimes "Just now" or "yesterday" is substituted for "last night". Sometimes the verse will not reference the preceding verse as in the first example above.

There are several ways in which the story progresses. Almost all entail the protagonist finding a spoiled peanut, eating it, getting sick, going to hospital and "dying", but what happens next varies. In some versions the protagonist wakes up and finds it was a dream. In others, the protagonist goes to heaven, then gets sent to hell or ends with finding another peanut in heaven.

Versions current in Baltimore in 1955 weren't quite as heavenly focused, and ended in: "Shoveling coal, shoveling coal, shoveling coal just now ..."

Another common variation on "last night" is "yesterday". This is used by "This Morning With Richard Not Judy" by Stewart Lee and Richard Herring.

Other substitutions include:

- Other foods can also be used, such as an apple, for which the second line can be "it was wormy".
- "It was rotten" by "Found it rotten", "It was mouldy", or "Green and mouldy".
- "Ate it anyway" by "Still I ate it" or "Ate it anyhow".
- "Got a stomachache" by "Got sick" or "Appendicitis".
- "Wouldn't take me" by "Kicked an angel", "Punched St. Peter", or "Said a naughty word".
- "Penicillin" by "Didn't Work".
- "Operation" by "Cut me open", "Took the peanut out", "Sewed me up again", "Left the scissors in", "Cut me open again", "Took some medicine" or "Had surgery"
- "Wouldn't take me" by "Wouldn't take me", "Went the other way", "Didn't want me".
- "It was a dream" by "Shoveling coal".
- "Couldn't save me" by "Died anyway"
- Sometimes, after "Woke up" it's "Found a peanut" again.

The Hebrew version sometimes introduces the verse: "Now I'm dead" (Akhshav ani met, עכשיו אני מת) before "I ascended to heaven". Sometimes "God" (Elohim, אלוהים), rather than "Gabriel" is used. Finally, sometimes before the recap either the verse: "So I answered him" (Az aniti lo, אז עניתי לו) or a single line: "So I answered him thus:" (Az aniti lo she-, -אז עניתי לו ש) is added.

== Origins ==
Some attribute the song to Jack Schafer of Detroit, Michigan in 1958, although the song appears in the 1949 film A Letter to Three Wives. Those lyrics end at "Ate it anyway."

Other evidence, however, suggests that the song was widely known in the United States as early as the 1940s. A 1945 issue of the Florida Flambeau describes "Found a Peanut" as an "old song" from "high school days." Likewise, the Norwalk Hour described a performance of the song in a school talent show in 1942.

There is much evidence showing that the song was widely known in Australia back at the start of the 1900s with newspaper reports listing it being sung at various country towns in school concerts football club celebration performances and other events where it was enjoyed by all.

== Appearance in popular culture ==
"Found a Peanut" is mentioned as a "famous Guide chant" in Dorothea Moore's 1934 book Judy, Patrol Leader.

The song appears in the 1949 film A Letter to Three Wives.

The song appears in the film Tromeo and Juliet in a scene in which a family in a car sings a song before getting into an accident. In the following scene, the character Detective Scalus says, "They found a peanut, all right, a peanut of death!"

The song also appears at the opening of the opera The Abduction of Figaro by Peter Schickele (P.D.Q. Bach).

The song is the title of the play "Found a Peanut" by Donald Margulies. The character Jeffery Smolowitz sings the song.

The song appeared on This Morning with Richard Not Judy with Stewart Lee and Richard Herring.

In the 1994 American satirical comedy Serial Mom, Beverly Sutphin (played by Kathleen Turner) sings the song with her fellow prisoners as they ride on a bus en route to court.

Macabre, the self-proclaimed Murder-Metal band from Chicago, released a version on their 2002 Morbid Campfire Songs album.

A version appears on the 2009 album Dracula Boots by Kid Congo and the Pink Monkey Birds.

A version with somewhat different lyrics was released by Thee Midniters in 1966.

The Kidsongs Kids and their camp counselors Eddie and Monica sing this song on A Day at Camp (1989) during their campfire medley.

Mentioned in Marc Maron's 2015 comedy special More Later.
