= Eine kleine Nachtmusik =

1787 composition by Wolfgang Amadeus Mozart

Serenade No. 13
- Eine kleine Nachtmusik
- by Wolfgang Amadeus Mozart
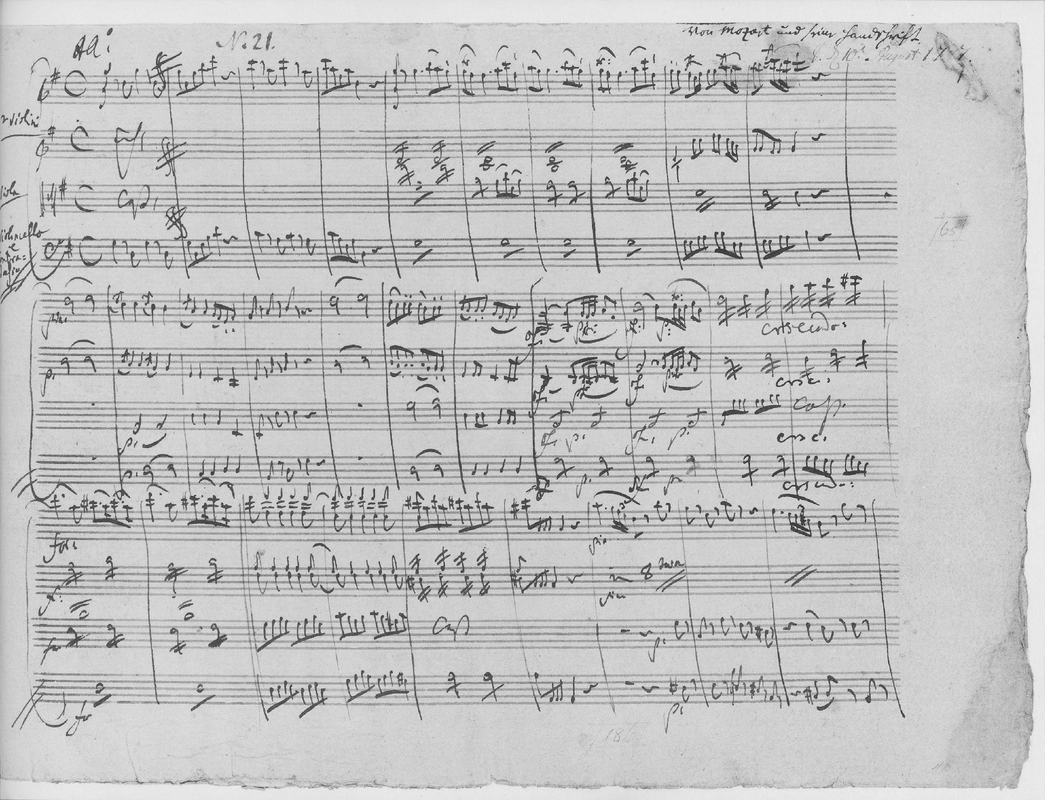
- Holograph manuscript, 1787
- Key: G major
- Catalogue: K. 525
- Composed: 1787
- Published: 1827, Offenbach am Main
- Publisher: Johann André
- Duration: ca. 17 minutes
- Movements: 4
- Scoring: Strings

The Serenade No. 13 in G major, K. 525, also titled Eine kleine Nachtmusik (Note: German pronunciation: [ˈaɪnə ˈklaɪnə ˈnaxtmuˌziːk].), was composed in 1787 for a chamber ensemble by Wolfgang Amadeus Mozart. The German subtitle literally means "a little night music", (Note: See "Nachtmusik" and "Notturno" entries in Grove Music Online.) and it is one of the composer's most famous works.

The circumstances around the composition of this piece are not known. The extant piece contains four movements: Allegro, Romance, Menuetto, and Finale. However, another movement is now believed to be lost.

== Background ==
The serenade was completed in Vienna on 10 August 1787, around the time when Mozart was working on the second act of his opera Don Giovanni. It is not known why he composed it, nor is it known whether it was performed in his lifetime. Wolfgang Hildesheimer, noting that most of Mozart's serenades were written on commission, suggests that this was a commission whose origin and first performance were not recorded.

The traditionally used name of the work comes from the entry Mozart made for it in his personal catalogue, which begins Eine kleine Nacht-Musick. (Note: The full entry reads (in German): Den 10-ten August. Eine kleine Nachtmusick, bestehend in einem Allegro, Menuett und Trio. – Romance. Menuett und Trio, und Finale. – 2 Violini, Viola e Bassi.; "On the 10th of August. A little serenade, consisting of an allegro, a minuet and trio, a romance, [another] minuet and trio, and a finale. For two violins, viola, and bass instruments." Mozart's incipit (quotation for identification purposes) consists of the first two bars of the first movement. The catalogue is posted at the web site Archived 19 October 2012 at the Wayback Machine of the British Library.) Zaslaw and Cowdery point out that Mozart was probably not giving the piece a special title but only entering in his records that he had completed a little serenade.

The work was not published until about 1827, over thirty years after Mozart's death, by Johann André in Offenbach am Main. Mozart's widow Constanze sold it to the publisher as part of a large bundle of her husband's compositions.

== Music ==
The serenade is written for an ensemble of two violins, viola, cello, and double bass, but it is often performed by string orchestras.

The work has four movements:

1. Allegro, 4/4
2. Romance: Andante, 2/2 in C major
3. Menuetto: Allegretto, 3/4 with trio in D major
4. Rondo: Allegro, 2/4

=== I. Allegro ===
I. Allegro
Performed by the Advent Chamber Orchestra

This first movement is in sonata-allegro form. It opens with a theme of an ascending Mannheim rocket. The second theme is more graceful and in D major, the dominant key of G major. The exposition closes in D major and is repeated. The development section begins in D major and touches on D minor and C major before the work returns to G major for the recapitulation.

=== II. Romance: Andante ===
II. Andante

The second movement, with the tempo marked Andante, is a Romance in C major, the subdominant key of G major, and was originally the third movement out of five. It is in rondo form, taking the shape A–B–A–C–A plus a final coda. The keys of the sections are C major for A and B, C minor for C. The middle appearance of A is truncated, consisting of only the first half of the theme. Daniel Heartz describes the movement as evoking a gavotte rhythm: each of its sections begins in the middle of the measure, with a double upbeat.

=== III. Menuetto: Allegretto ===
III. Menuetto

The third movement, marked Allegretto, is a minuet and trio, both in 3/4 time. The minuet is in the home key of G major; the contrasting trio is in D major, the dominant key of G major. As is normal in this form, the minuet is played again da capo following the trio.

=== IV. Rondo: Allegro ===
IV. Allegro
Synthesized version

The fourth and last movement is in lively tempo, marked Allegro; the key is again G major, and the movement is written in sonata form. Mozart specifies repeats not just for the exposition section but also for the following development and recapitulation sections. The recapitulation's first theme is unusual because only its last two bars return, and in the parallel minor. A coda ends the piece.

== Possible extra movement ==
In the catalogue entry mentioned above, Mozart listed the work as having five movements ("Allegro – Minuet and Trio – Romance – Minuet and Trio – Finale."). The second movement in his listing — a minuet and trio — has long been thought lost, and musicologist Alfred Einstein does not know who removed it. In his 1984 recording, Christopher Hogwood used a minuet of Thomas Attwood (found in his sketchbooks used while he took lessons from Mozart) and an additional newly composed trio to substitute the missing movement. Einstein suggested, however, that a minuet in the Piano Sonata in B♭ major, K. 498a, is the missing movement. K. 498a, which is credited to the composer August Eberhard Müller, incorporates significant amounts of Mozart's work in the form of reworkings of material from the piano concertos K. 450, K. 456, and K. 595, leading Einstein to suggest that the minuet in Müller's sonata might be an arrangement of the missing movement from Eine kleine Nachtmusik, however, the evidence for this is limited.

In 1971, this movement was incorporated into a recording of the work prepared by the musicologist and performer Thurston Dart. In 1989, the minuet and trio of K. 498a was again recorded as part of an arrangement of Eine kleine Nachtmusik made by Jonathan Del Mar for Nimbus Records.

== Modern reception ==
Today, the serenade is widely performed and recorded. Britannica has referred to it as "among the most frequently performed and iconic of all classical compositions." Hildesheimer suggests that it is the most popular of all Mozart's works, writing: "even if we hear it on every street corner, its high quality is undisputed, an occasional piece from a light but happy pen." This piece has been featured in studies about the impact of music on weight gain in farmed fish, in which it produced greater weight gain than other music or white noise, and on wellbeing in humans. Study participants listening to the serenade rated hills as less steep than participants listening to the Adagietto from Mahler's fifth symphony.

== See also ==
- Ganz kleine Nachtmusik: An earlier, shorter Mozart piece given a similar name
- A Little Night Music: A Stephen Sondheim musical named after the composition
- Parodies by Peter Schickele:
  - Eine kleine Nichtmusik
  - A Little Nightmare Music

== Notes and references ==
Notes

Sources

- Broder, Nathan (June 1956). "Eine kleine Nachtmusik, 1787. Faksimile der Original-Handschrift by Wolfgang Amadeus Mozart, Manfred Gorke". Notes (review). 13 (3): 514. doi:10.2307/893344. JSTOR 893344.
- Dart, Thurston (1971). Chamber Music by Mozart at Discogs (list of releases).
- Einstein, Alfred (1962). Mozart, His Character, His Work. Translated by Arthur Mendel, Nathan Broder. Oxford: Oxford University Press. OCLC 511324.
- Giegling, Franz [in German]; Rehm, Wolfgang (1996). Neue Mozart-Ausgabe, Kritischer Bericht (in German). Vol. X/29/2.
- Goodman, Roy. "Mozart, Eine kleine Nachtmusic". Nimbus Records. NI7023. Archived from the original on 26 April 2009.
- Heartz, Daniel (2009). Mozart, Haydn and Early Beethoven, 1781–1802. New York: W. W. Norton.
- Hildesheimer, Wolfgang (1991). Mozart. Translated by Marion Faber. Macmillan. ISBN 0-374-52298-7.
- Holoman, D. Kern (1992). Evenings with the Orchestra: A Norton Companion for Concertgoers. W. W. Norton & Company. ISBN 0-393-02936-0.
- Manze, Andrew (2003). Mozart Night Music (PDF). The English Concert. Harmonia Mundi. HMU 807280 – via nativedsd.com.
- Papoutsoglou, Sofronios E.; Karakatsouli, Nafsika; Psarrou, Anna; Apostolidou, Sofia; Papoutsoglou, Eustratios S.; Batzina, Alkisti; Leondaritis, Georgios; Sakellaridis, N. (February 2015). "Gilthead seabream (Sparus aurata) response to three music stimuli (Mozart—"Eine kleine Nachtmusik", Anonymous—"Romanza", Bach—"Violin Concerto No. 1") and white noise under recirculating water conditions". Fish Physiology and Biochemistry. 41: 219–232. doi:10.1007/s10695-014-0018-5. ISSN 0920-1742.
- Rexroth, Dieter (2017). "Preface". Eine kleine Nachtmusik: Serenade G major, K. 525. Eulenburg. ISBN 978-3-7957-1345-4.
- Riener, Cedar R.; Stefanucci, Jeanine K.; Proffitt, Dennis R.; Clore, Gerald (2011). "An effect of mood on the perception of geographical slant". Cognition and Emotion. 25 (1): 174–182. doi:10.1080/02699931003738026. ISSN 0269-9931. PMC 3298357. PMID 21432665.
- Schwarm, Betsy. "Eine kleine Nachtmusik". Encyclopædia Britannica.
- Smith, J. C.; Joyce, C. A. (September 2004). "Mozart versus New Age Music: Relaxation States, Stress, and ABC Relaxation Theory". Journal of Music Therapy. 41 (3): 215–224. doi:10.1093/jmt/41.3.215. ISSN 0022-2917. PMID 15327344.
- Unverricht, Hubert; Eisen, Cliff (2001a). "Nachtmusik (Ger.: 'night music')". Grove Music Online (8th ed.). Oxford University Press. doi:10.1093/gmo/9781561592630.article.19524. ISBN 978-1-56159-263-0. (subscription, Wikilibrary access, or UK public library membership required)
- Unverricht, Hubert; Eisen, Cliff (2001b). "Notturno (It.: 'nocturnal')". Grove Music Online (8th ed.). Oxford University Press. doi:10.1093/gmo/9781561592630.article.20135. ISBN 978-1-56159-263-0. (subscription, Wikilibrary access, or UK public library membership required)
- Zaslaw, Neal; Cowdery, William (1991). The Compleat Mozart: A Guide to the Musical Works of Wolfgang Amadeus Mozart. Norton. ISBN 0-393-02886-0.
