= P. D. Q. Bach in Houston: We Have a Problem! =

P.D.Q. Bach in Houston: We Have a Problem!

Live album by Peter Schickele
- Released: 2006
- Recorded: Houston, Texas, United States
- Genre: Classical

Peter Schickele chronology
The Ill-Conceived P. D. Q. Bach Anthology (1998)	P.D.Q. Bach in Houston: We Have a Problem! (2006)	P. D. Q. Bach and Peter Schickele: The Jekyll and Hyde Tour (2007)

P.D.Q. Bach in Houston: We Have a Problem! is a live performance celebrating 40 years of P. D. Q. Bach. This performance features Professor Peter Schickele with Orchestra X conducted by Peter Jacoby. It includes never-before-recorded performances of "Trumpet Involuntary" movement of Iphigenia in Brooklyn, and also the rounds Odden und Enden (many of which have been previously unavailable on CD).

== Performers ==
- Professor Peter Schickele, conductor, wine bottle, windbreaker, slide windbreaker, singist and musicological master
- Orchestra X, Peter Jacoby, conductor (on-screen credit: "semiconductor")
- Okay Chorale, Tom Jaber, chorusmaster (on-screen credit: "seasoned conductor")
- William “Bill” Walters, Manager of the Stage
- Gifford Nielsen, color commentator
- Michèle Eaton, singist
- David Düsing, singist
- Gerrod Pagenkopf, bargain counter tenor
- Jessica Smith, off-coloratura soprano
- Cybele Gouverneur, mezzanine-soprano
- John Weinel, tenor profundo
- Sam Handley, basso blotto
- Shih-Ting Huang, violin, captain of the orchestra
- Jaryn Philleo, oboe, double reeds
- Melanie Lancon, flute, slide whistle
- Marat Rakhmatullaev, bassoon, tromboon
- Cesar Martinez Bourguet, cello, discontinuo
- Larry Hernandez, trumpet
- Matt Menger, horn, shower hose in D
- Jacob Sustaita, viola
- Phil Moody, kazoo primo
- Brian Shircliffe, kazoo secundo
- John Welton, continuo accordiano
- Lillian Copeland, Ben Kamins, double reeds
- Patty Moeling, slide whistle
- Cheerleaders from the Spirit of Houston Cougar Band, themselves

== Program ==
1. "Desecration of the House" Overture
2. Schleptet in E♭ major, S. 0
  - Molto Larghissimo — Allegro Boffo
  - Menuetto con Brio ma Senza Trio
  - Adagio Saccharino
  - Yehudi Menuetto
  - Presto Hey Nonny Nonnio
3. Iphigenia in Brooklyn, S. 53,162
  - I. Trumpet Involuntary
  - II. Aria: "When Hyperion"
  - III. Recitative: "And Lo!"
  - IV. Ground: "Dying"
  - V. Recitative: "And in a vision"
  - VI. Aria: "Running"
4. "Unbegun" Symphony (Prof. Schickele)
  - III. Minuet
  - IV. Andante — Allegro
5. New Horizons in Music Appreciation
  - Allegro con brio from Symphony No. 5 in C minor (Beethoven)
6. Fuga Meshuga from The Musical Sacrifice, S. 50% off
7. The Seasonings, S. 1½ tsp.
  - Chorus: "Tarragon of virtue is full"
  - Recitative: "And there were in the same country"
  - Duet: "Bide thy thyme"
  - Fugue
  - Recitative: "Then asked he"
  - Chorale: "By the leeks of Babylon"
  - Recitative: "Then she gave in"
  - Aria: "Open sesame seeds"
  - Recitative: "So saying"
  - Duet: "Summer is a cumin seed"
  - Soloists and chorus: "To curry favor, favor curry"

DVD Bonus Selections

1. "Unbegun" Symphony with Theme Identifications
2. Odden und Enden
  - The Mule
  - Three-Step Crab Dinner
  - O Serpent
  - Johann Sebastian Bach (Prof. Schickele)
  - Please, Kind Sir, from The Art of the Ground Round
3. KUHT interview with Peter Schickele
4. Bio of Peter Schickele, P.D.Q. Bach and Peter Jacoby

== Sources ==
- P.D.Q. Bach in Houston: We Have a Problem!
