= Music You Can't Get Out of Your Head =

Studio album by P. D. Q. Bach
- Released: 1982
- Label: Vanguard

P. D. Q. Bach chronology
Liebeslieder Polkas (1980)	Music You Can't Get Out of Your Head (1982)	A Little Nightmare Music (1983)

Music You Can't Get Out of Your Head is a 1982 album of music by Peter Schickele writing as P. D. Q. Bach. The album describes itself as "P.D.Q. Bach’s answer to Haydn’s "Farewell" Symphony" and includes "all the music from The Civilian Barber that's been discovered." The album was released on Vanguard Records in 1982.

== Performers ==
- Professor Peter Schickele conducting the New York Pick-Up Ensemble
- Marilyn Brustadt, off-coloratura soprano
- Paul Dunkel and Diva Goodfriend-Koven, pumpflute
- Lauren Goldstein, Bill Becker, and Abdul Falafel, double reed hookah
- Early Anderson, Polizeiposaune (police trombone) and trombonus interruptus

== Track listing ==
- "Howdy" Symphony in D Major, S. 6 7/8
  - Introduzione casuale; Allegro con mucho brio
  - Andante con mojo
  - Menuetto allegretto
  - Come un pipistrello fuori dall' inferno
- "Perückenstück" (Hair Piece) from "The Civilian Barber", S. 4F
- Suite from "The Civilian Barber", S. 4F
  - Entrance of the dragoons (tempo di Marsha)
  - Dance of St. Vitus
  - His majesty's minuet
  - Fanfare for the royal shaft
  - Her majesty's minuet
  - Departure of the dragoons (tempo di on the double)

== Sources ==
- P.D.Q. Bach: Music You Can't Get Out of Your Head, album details
