= Black Forest Bluegrass =

Studio album by P.D.Q. Bach
- Released: 1979
- Label: Vanguard

P.D.Q. Bach chronology
Portrait of P.D.Q. Bach (1977)	Black Forest Bluegrass (1979)	Liebeslieder Polkas (1980)

Black Forest Bluegrass is a recording of the music of Peter Schickele under his comic pseudonym of P.D.Q. Bach, featuring the composer and "a bluegrass band with a Baroque orchestra, a wind octet with toys, a commercial with a snake — this album has it all!" The album was released on Vanguard Records in 1979.

== Performers ==
- Professor Peter Schickele, bass, conductor, snake ("that's an instrument")
- The New York Pick-Up Ensemble, Robert Bernhardt, conductor
- John Ferrante, tenor
- Eric Weissberg, mandolin and harmonica
- Bill Keith, banjo and harmonica
- Happy Traum, guitar and harmonica
- Donald "Don" Palma, bass and harmonica

According to the album's liner notes, the performers pictured on the cover are Tommy Mann and his Magic Mountain Boys.

== Track listing ==
- Cantata: Blaues Gras (Bluegrass Cantata), S. 6 string
  - Recitative and aria: "Blaues Gras"
  - Recitative: "O"
  - Aria: "Du Bist Im Land"
  - Recitative: "O"
  - Duet: "Ich Sehe"
  - Chorale: "Ich Gehe"
  - Duet: "Sag' Mir"
- No-no Nonette for assorted winds and toys, S. 86
  - First Movement
  - Second Movement
  - Third Movement
  - Fourth Movement
  - Last Movement
- "Hear Me Through" from Diverse Ayres on Sundrie Notions, S. 99 44/100

== Sources ==
- "P.D.Q. Bach: Black Forest Bluegrass"
