= Echo Sonata for Two Unfriendly Groups of Instruments =

Composition by P.D.Q. Bach

The Echo Sonata for Two Unfriendly Groups of Instruments is a satirical instrumental work written by Peter Schickele under the pseudonym of P.D.Q. Bach, whom Schickele studies as a "scholar".

== Performance ==
The piece is a sextet intended in the baroque style, the two unfriendly groups of instruments being the three woodwinds—flute, oboe and bassoon—and the three brass—trumpet, french horn and trombone. The basic premise is that the woodwinds play the piece straightforwardly, while the brass instruments (who don't like the woodwinds and/or the conductor) do everything possible to pervert the work, including playing their echo atonally/arhythmically, playing in a carnival or ragtime style, ignoring their cue (even when repeated) and then playing "nanny nanny boo-boo" over the subsequent woodwind line, and dramatic ritardando and rallentando marks that cover the other group's parts. This understandably frustrates the woodwinds and the conductor. At the breaking point, the conductor and/or woodwind group pull out guns and point them at the brass section, whose broad, obnoxiously loud line trails off. The woodwinds play their final line, and the brass finally cooperate... until they refuse to play their final note, which is completed by the woodwinds.

The piece was one of those performed at a tribute Concert in New York a year after Peter Schickele's death.

== Recordings ==
The piece appears in two albums, Report From Hoople: P. D. Q. Bach On The Air and Portrait of PDQ Bach. In the former, the presentation of the piece is itself satirical in nature with the piece (recorded on tape) being played too slow, then too fast, and even backwards (Schickele quips while attempting to fix the problem, "This is a heck of a way to start a morning, isn't it?") before the machine playing the tape explodes. The second later album features the piece in its entirety (though the recorded introduction to the piece still pokes fun at the recording and editing process).
