= The Short-Tempered Clavier and other dysfunctional works for keyboard =

Studio album by P. D. Q. Bach
- Released: 1995
- Recorded: February 22, 1995 – May 30, 1995
- Genres: Classical; Comedy
- Length: 71:56
- Label: Telarc

P. D. Q. Bach chronology
Two Pianos Are Better Than One (1994)	The Short-Tempered Clavier and other dysfunctional works for keyboard (1995)	The Dreaded P. D. Q. Bach Collection (1996)

The Short-Tempered Clavier and other dysfunctional works for keyboard is an album by Peter Schickele, released in 1995 by Telarc Records under his pseudonym, P. D. Q. Bach. The album contains "works for various types of keyboards, including theatre organ, calliope, the ever popular piano, and the organ of the King Congregational Church of Fayray, North Dakota".

The title is a parody of Johann Sebastian Bach's Well-Tempered Clavier.

== Content ==
The opening work, The Short-Tempered Clavier, incorporates elements from Bach's Well-Tempered Clavier, as well as references to other well-known tunes, including "Chopsticks", the opening of Beethoven's Fifth Symphony, and "Mary Had a Little Lamb". These pieces are performed by pianist Christopher O'Riley.

The Little Pickle Book is a series of pieces scored primarily for theatre organ and featuring the dill piccolo. Additional instruments used include bass drum, chimes, xylophone, and crank.

Sonata Da Circo was recorded in a circus museum in Indiana and features music for steam calliope.

The album concludes with Three Chorale-Based Piecelets, variations on familiar hymns performed on a Casio keyboard.

== Performers ==
Performers on the album are:

- Professor Peter Schickele, steam calliope, organ
- Christopher O'Riley, piano
- Dennis James, theater organ
- David Robinson

== Track listing ==
1. Opening & Introduction (4:50)

The Short-Tempered Clavier, Preludes and Fugues in all the Major and Minor Keys Except for the Really Hard Ones, S. easy as 3.14159265

1. I. C major (2:46)
2. II. C minor (1:48)
3. III. C♯ minor (3:35)
4. IV. D major (1:32)
5. V. D minor (2:28)
6. VI. E♭ major (2:19)
7. VII. F major (4:01)
8. VIII. G minor (2:02)
9. IX. G major (2:33)
10. X. A major (3:37)
11. XI. A minor (1:39)
12. XII. B♭ major (3:13)
13. Introduction (3:16)

Little Pickle Book for theater organ and dill piccolos, S. 6

1. I. Toccata et Fuga Obnoxia (3:52)
2. II. Chorale Prelude (Ave Maria et Agnus Dei) (1:49)
3. III. Fantasia sopra "Fräulein Maria Mack" (1:36)
4. IV. Lullaby and Goodnight (2:35)
5. Introduction (1:16)

Sonata Da Circo (Circus Sonata) for steam calliope, S. 3 ring

1. I. Spiel Vorspiel (2:34)
2. II. Entrada Grande (3:07)
3. III. Smokski the Russian Bear (1:23)
4. IV. Toccata Ecdysiastica (1:05)
5. Calliope Frustration (0:42)
6. Introduction (1:07)

Three Chorale-Based Piecelets for Organ, S. III

1. I. Chorale: "Orally" (2:05)
2. II. Chorale Prelude on an American Hymn for the Last Sunday Before the Fourth Day of the Seventh Month After New Year's Eve (1:24)
3. III. Chorale Variations on "In der Nacht so Hell, der Petrus ist mein Freund" (5:23)
4. Epilogue (1:24)

== Technical information ==
The Short-Tempered Clavier was recorded in Mechanics Hall (Worcester, Massachusetts), on February 22, 1995.

Little Pickle Book was recorded on the Mighty Wurlitzer Theater Organ in the Imperial Spud Theater, Hoople, North Dakota, on April 11, 1995, with additional recording at Commercial Recording Studio, Studio 1, Cleveland, Ohio, on May 1, 1995.

Sonata Da Circo was recorded on a Morecraft Steam Calliope at the Circus Hall of Fame, Peru, Indiana, on May 30, 1995.

Three Chorale-Based Piecelets was recorded next to the feedlots at King Congregational Church, Fayray, North Dakota, on May 1, 1995.

== See also ==
- Johann Sebastian Bach
- P. D. Q. Bach
- Peter Schickele
- The Well-Tempered Clavier
