= WTWP Classical Talkity-Talk Radio =

Studio album by P. D. Q. Bach
- Released: 1991
- Label: Telarc

P. D. Q. Bach chronology
Oedipus Tex and Other Choral Calamities (1990)	WTWP Classical Talkity-Talk Radio (1991)	Music for an Awful Lot of Winds and Percussion (1992)

WTWP Classical Talkity-Talk Radio was released in 1991 by Telarc Records. The album contains the "last hour of the broadcast from station WTWP in Hoople on May 5, 1991, the 184th anniversary of the death of P. D. Q. Bach." The station name WTWP means "Wall to Wall Pachelbel" in which some unusual instruments play his Canon in D.

Towards the middle of the repeat of the Canon, Blondie suffers a nervous breakdown, being the result of an overdose of Pachelbel.

== Performers ==
- Professor Peter Schickele
- Donna Brown as Blondie
- Elliott Forrest as Jocko
- Dana Krueger, mezzanine-soprano
- Peter Lurye, piano
- Enos Presley, Elvis Presley's younger brother
- Members of the Cleveland Orchestra
- Calliope, a renaissance band

== Track listing ==
- Getting ready
- Theme song - Opening
- Canzon Per Sonar a Sei — Count Them — Sei (P.D.Q. Bach)
- Pledge plea
- Four Folk Song Upsettings, S. 4 (P.D.Q. Bach)
  - "Little Bunny Hop Hop Hop"
  - "Oft of an E'en Ere Night is Nigh"
  - "He Came From Over Yonder Ridge"
  - "The Farmer on the Dole"
- Station ID
- Classical Kwickie-Kwiz
- "Sam and Janet" (P.D.Q. Bach)
- Weather report
- Hound Dog (Leiber & Stoller)
- Flip side intro
- Love Me (Leiber & Stoller)
- Station ID
- Cadenza
- "Safe" Sextet, S. R33–L45–R(pass it once)78 (P.D.Q. Bach)
- Oo-La-La intro
- Oo-La-La: Cookin' French Like the French Cook French
- Station ID
- Canzonetta intro
- Canzonetta "La Hooplina" (The Girl from Hoople) S. 16 going on 30 (P.D.Q. Bach)
- Wrap-up
- Theme song (Pachelbel's Canon)
