= Blust =

Blust is a surname. Notable people with the surname include:

- Christina Blust, musician
- John Blust (born 1954), American politician
- Robert Blust (1940–2022), American linguist
