= Tennessee Bassoon Quartet =

The Tennessee Bassoon Quartet, formed in 1985, consists of bassoonists Keith McClelland, James Lotz, James Lassen and Michael Benjamin. The four, from Knoxville and Oak Ridge, Tennessee, formed the group to provide additional performance opportunities for their bassoon talents. They have performed primarily in Tennessee, North Carolina, and Kentucky with a repertoire that includes Renaissance music, jazz, Gilbert and Sullivan, Saint-Saëns, and Scott Joplin.

The Tennessee Bassoon Quartet performed on the Grammy Award winning PDQ Bach recording Music for an Awful Lot of Winds and Percussion.

== Members ==
Keith McClelland has been principal bassoonist with the Knoxville Symphony Orchestra since 1972. Currently a member of the Knoxville Symphony Woodwind Quintet, McClelland has been a member of Windstrum, a bassoon/guitar duo; Lyric Chamberwinds, Smoky Mountain Chamber Players, and the Tennessee Bassoon Quartet. He is also professor of bassoon at the University of Tennessee in Knoxville.

James Lotz is principal bassoonist with the Bryan Symphony Orchestra. He is a member of the Cumberland Quintet and of the Nashville Chamber Orchestra, and serves on the faculty of the Sewanee Summer Music Festival. He has been the principal bassoonist of the Chattanooga Symphony Orchestra and the Jaap Schroeder Chamber Orchestra as well as a member of the Bridgeport Symphony, Norwalk Symphony, Connecticut Grand Opera, Knoxville Symphony, Breckenridge Music Festival and the Mexico City Philharmonic. He is an active studio musician in Nashville, and has participated in numerous commercial recordings for PDQ Bach, Matchbox 20 and Alan Jackson, as well as recordings of classical chamber music, orchestral music and movie soundtracks. His principal teachers include Keith McClelland, William Winstead, Arthur Weisberg and Stephen Maxym.

James Lassen has been co-principal bassoonist of the Bergen Philharmonic Orchestra since 1996. He is a respected bassoonist in symphonic and jazz circles and is also active as a composer. He was born in Montana, but has roots in Scandinavia. He has also held bassoon positions with orchestras in Santiago, Chile and Louisiana. He has performed with jazz greats Ellis Marsalis, Charles Neville, Steve Masakowski and Bobby McFerrin.

Michael Benjamin was a member of the Knoxville Symphony Orchestra for twenty years, and currently plays for the Oak Ridge and Kingsport Symphonies.
