= Unverricht =

Unverricht may refer to:

== People ==
- Heinrich Unverricht (1853–1912), German internist
- Hubert Unverricht (1927–2017), German musicologist

== Other uses ==
- Unverricht–Lundborg disease
