= Portrait of P. D. Q. Bach =

Studio album by P.D.Q. Bach
- Released: 1977
- Genre: Classical; Comedy
- Length: 44:36
- Label: Vanguard Records

P.D.Q. Bach chronology
The Intimate; P.D.Q. Bach (1974)	Portrait of P. D. Q. Bach (1977)	Black Forest Bluegrass (1979)

Portrait of P.D.Q. Bach was released in 1977 on Vanguard Records. The album features mostly the work of Peter Schickele writing as P.D.Q. Bach, with one contribution under his own name.

== Performers ==
- The New York Pick-Up Ensemble, Professor Peter Schickele, conductor
- John Ferrante, bargain counter tenor
- Harris Poor, basso blotto
- Ransom Wilson and Diva Goodfriend-Koven, tape recorders, hand flutes, corrugahorn, nose flutes
- Early Anderson, trombonus interruptus
- Duh Brooklyn Boys Chorus, James McCarthy, director
- John Solum, flute
- Leonard Arner, oboe
- Lorin Glickman, bassoon
- Theodore Weis, trumpet
- William G. Brown, French horn
- Neal Di Biase, trombone

== Track listing ==
- Introduction (1:50)
- Missa Hilarious, S. N_{2}O
  - Yriekay (4:53)
  - Gloria (3:02)
  - Credo (3:47)
  - Sanctus (3:49)
  - Angus Dei (3:49)
- Introduction (:28)
- Eine Kleine Nichtmusik (Schickele) (11:45)
  - Allegro
  - Romanze
  - Menuetto
  - Rondo (Allegro)
- Introduction (1:28)
- Echo Sonata for Two Unfriendly Groups of Instruments, S. 99999999 (2:14)
- Introduction (1:02)
- A Consort of Choral Christmas Carols, S. 359 (6:29)
  - "Throw the Yule Log On, Uncle John"
  - "O Little Town of Hackensack"
  - "Good King Kong Looked Out"

== Eine Kleine Nichtmusik ==
Eine Kleine Nichtmusik ("A Little Not Music") is a quodlibet consisting of Mozart's work Eine kleine Nachtmusik played in its entirety, along with snippets of dozens of famous tunes heard in counterpoint throughout the piece, taken from both American folk music and the classical repertoire.

== Sources ==
- Portrait of P.D.Q. Bach, schickele.com
