= Oedipus Rex (disambiguation) =

Oedipus Rex (c. 429 BC) is a play by Sophocles.

Oedipus Rex may also refer to:

- Oedipus, a king of Thebes in Greek mythology
- Pseudoeurycea rex, a salamander species formerly known as Oedipus rex

== Literature and media ==
- Edipo re (1920), an opera published posthumously as by Ruggero Leoncavallo
- Oedipus (Seneca) (1st century), a play by Seneca
- Oedipus rex (opera) (1927), an opera-oratorio in two acts by Igor Stravinsky
- Œdipe (opera) (1926), an opera in four acts by George Enescu
- Oedipus Rex (1957 film), a film version of the Canadian Stratford Festival production, using the William Butler Yeats text
- Oedipus Rex, a song by Tom Lehrer from the album An Evening Wasted with Tom Lehrer (1959)
- Oedipus Rex (1967 film), an Italian film directed by Pier Paolo Pasolini
- Oedipus the King, 1968 film directed by Philip Saville

== See also ==
- Oedipus Hex (disambiguation)
- Oedipus der Tyrann (1959), opera by Carl Orff
- Oedipus Tex (1990), satirical oratorio by P. D. Q. Bach
