= Oedipus Hex =

Oedipus Hex may refer to:

- Oedipus Hex (Bewitched), 1966
- Oedipus Hex (CSI: NY), 2006

== See also ==
- Oedipus Rex (disambiguation)
- Oedipus Tex, oratorio by P. D. Q. Bach
