= Gifford Nielsen =

American professional football player

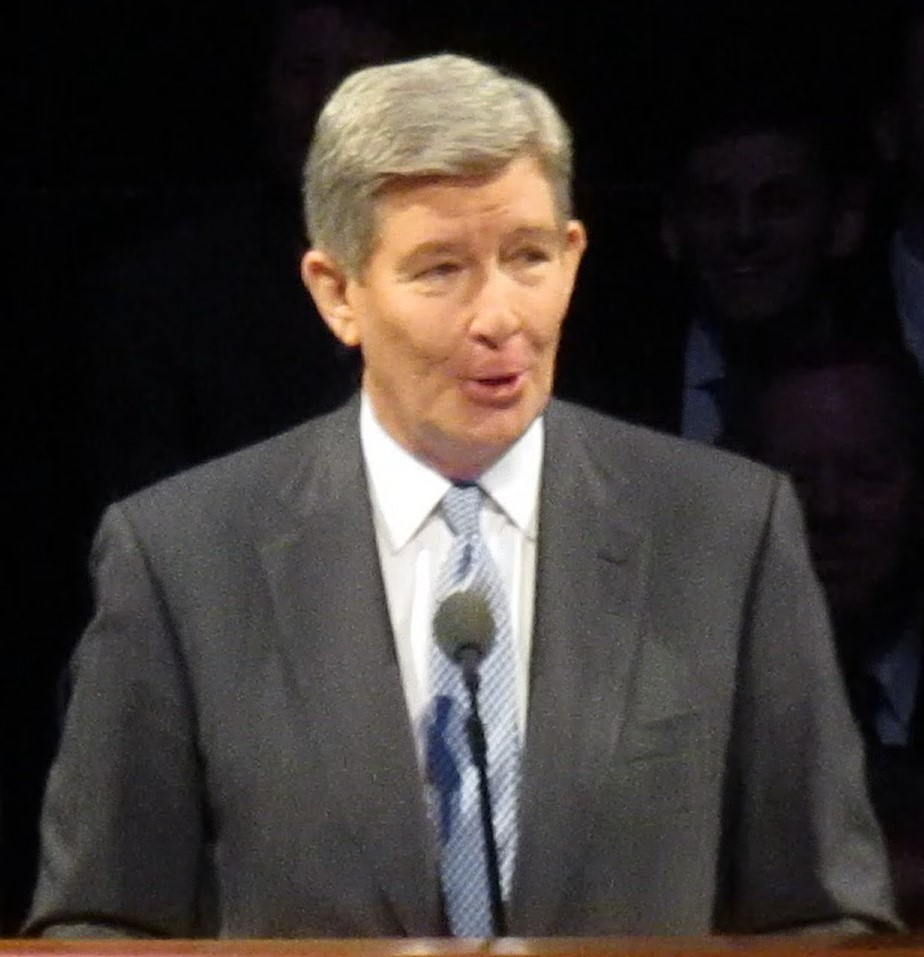
- Nielsen in 2018

No. 14
- Position: Quarterback

Personal information
- Born: October 25, 1954 (age 72); Provo, Utah, U.S.
- Listed height: 6 ft 4 in (1.93 m)
- Listed weight: 205 lb (93 kg)

Career information
- High school: Provo
- College: BYU (1977–1979)
- NFL draft: 1978: 3rd round, 73rd overall pick

Career history
- Houston Oilers (1978–1983)

Awards and highlights
- WAC Offensive Player of the Year (1976); First-team All-American (1976); BYU Cougars No. 14 retired

Career NFL statistics
- Passing attempts: 498
- Passing completions: 273
- Completion percentage: 54.8%
- TD–INT: 20–22
- Passing yards: 3,255
- Passer rating: 70
- Stats at Pro Football Reference
- College Football Hall of Fame

S. Gifford Nielsen

First Quorum of the Seventy
- April 6, 2013
- Called by: Thomas S. Monson

Personal details
- Born: Stanley Gifford Nielsen; October 25, 1954 (age 72); Provo, Utah, U.S.
- Spouse(s): Wendy Olson (m. 1975)
- Children: 6

Stanley Gifford Nielsen (born October 25, 1954) is an American former professional football player who was a quarterback for the Houston Oilers of the National Football League (NFL). He was the sports director of KHOU in Houston from 1984 until March 31, 2009. He has been a general authority of the Church of Jesus Christ of Latter-day Saints (LDS Church) since April 2013.

== Football career ==
=== High school ===
Nielsen grew up in Provo, Utah, and attended Provo High School, playing as the school's quarterback.

=== College career ===
Nielsen remained in Provo and attended Brigham Young University, where he was an All-American quarterback for the Cougars under head coach LaVell Edwards. His best season was his junior year in 1976, in which he passed for 3,192 yards and 29 touchdowns, earning WAC Offensive Player of the Year honors. He was inducted into the College Football Hall of Fame in 1994.

=== NFL career ===
Nielsen was selected in the third round of the 1978 NFL draft (73rd overall) by the Houston Oilers, the team with which he spent his entire NFL career, six seasons as a part-time quarterback.

Nielsen served as backup to Dan Pastorini in 1978 and 1979 and to Ken Stabler in 1980 and 1981. He played the most games in his last two seasons, 1982–1983, when he shared quarterbacking duties with Archie Manning and Oliver Luck.

From 1984 to 1987, he served as a color commentator on Oilers radio broadcasts.

== TV sports anchor ==
Nielsen was the sports director at CBS affiliate KHOU in Houston from 1984 to 2009. He also made an appearance in P.D.Q. Bach in Houston: We Have a Problem! as a color commentator alongside Peter Schickele during a sketch of Beethoven's Fifth, in which the performance was done as if it were a mock football/hockey game.

== LDS Church service ==
Nielsen has served in the LDS Church in many capacities, including elders quorum president, bishop, president of the Houston Texas South Stake, mission president's counselor, and area seventy. He was released as an area seventy on April 6, 2013, and called as a general authority and member of the First Quorum of the Seventy. Among his assignments, Nielsen served for a time in the presidency of the church's Pacific Area. From August 2019 to August 2022 Nielsen served as president of the North America Central Area. From August 2022 until August 2024 he was president of the Africa West Area. He was designated as an emeritus general authority in 2024.

== Scouting 100 year Anniversary ==
Nielsen was the master of ceremonies at the "100 Years of Scouting" celebration at Minute Maid Park in Texas.

== See also ==
- List of college football yearly passing leaders
