= Pervertimento for Bagpipes, Bicycle and Balloons =

Composition by P. D. Q. Bach

Pervertimento for Bagpipes, Bicycle and Balloons is a satirical work authored by Peter Schickele under the pseudonym P.D.Q. Bach, whose works and life Schickele purported to study. It is a concerto featuring the aforementioned bagpipes, bicycle and balloons as solo musical instruments accompanied by a string orchestra. The title is a play on a divertimento.

== Description ==
In Schickele's own words during the introduction, "The title, Pervertimento is... not P.D.Q. Bach's own. As a matter of fact, it was not so much a title as an opinion of the people who first played it". The piece incorporates several unconventional instruments, and in some cases non-instruments.

The bagpipes player uses three radically different incarnations of the instrument; first, the chanter is removed from the bagpipes and played similar to an oboe or clarinet. "The tone, though jarring, is not altogether unexpected" in the words of the dust jacket for the original LP. In the subsequent movement, a "practice bagpipes" with the drones removed and the chanter muffled is used. In the final movement, the full bagpipes are employed.

Balloons are rubbed and popped through the majority of the piece. For the final chord, three helium balloons, attached to pitchpipes, are released from the percussion section behind the orchestra. The bicycle is "played" first as a percussion instrument using playing cards in the spokes, then by blowing through the handlebars similar to a trumpet, and finally using pedal power to drive a rotary whistle.

== Recordings ==
The work was first performed at Carnegie Hall and recorded live on the album An Hysteric Return: P.D.Q. Bach at Carnegie Hall.
