= P. D. Q. Bach and Peter Schickele: The Jekyll and Hyde Tour =

P. D. Q. Bach & Peter Schickele: The Jekyll & Hyde Tour

Live album by Peter Schickele
- Released: 2007
- Recorded: June 16, 2007
- Genre: Classical; Comedy
- Length: 77:00
- Label: Telarc

Peter Schickele chronology
The Ill-Conceived P. D. Q. Bach Anthology (1998)	P. D. Q. Bach & Peter Schickele: The Jekyll & Hyde Tour (2007)

P. D. Q. Bach & Peter Schickele: The Jekyll & Hyde Tour was released in 2007 by Telarc Records. The album contains works by Peter Schickele, sometimes as his alter-ego P. D. Q. Bach (Jekyll and Hyde), including a collection of vocal works and a string quartet. It is a live recording of the "Jekyll & Hyde" Tour.

== Performers ==
- Professor Peter Schickele, piano, bass
- Michèle Eaton, off-coloratura soprano
- David Düsing, tenor profundo
- The Armadillo String Quartet
  - Barry Socher, violin
  - Connie Kupka, violin
  - Ray Tischer, viola
  - Armen Ksajikian, cello

== Track listing ==
- Long Live The King, S. 1789 (P. D. Q. Bach) (1:58)
- Introduction (6:30)
- Four Next-To-Last Songs, S. Ω–1 (P. D. Q. Bach)
  - Das kleines Birdie (2:53)
  - Der Cowboykönig (3:09)
  - Gretchen am Spincycle (1:13)
  - Es was ein dark und shtormy Night (5:10)
- Introduction (5:37)
- String Quartet in F major "The Moose", S. Y2K (P. D. Q. Bach)
  - Allegro ma non troposphere (11:09)
  - Largo alla Fargo (6:10)
  - Menuetto no sweato (3:41)
  - Grave e molto deepo; Allegro con brie
- Two Rounds (Peter Schickele)
  - Hedi McKinley (1:00)
  - Introduction (1:20)
  - D'Indy's Turkey (0:46)
- Introduction (1:10)
- Two P. D. Q. Bach Rounds
  - The Mule (1:02)
  - Introduction (0:13)
  - O Serpent (1:28)
- Two Songs (Peter Schickele)
  - If Love Is Real (2:50)
  - Introduction (1:42)
  - Cyndi (2:40)
- Introduction (1:15)
- Songs from Shakespeare (Peter Schickele)
  - Macbeth's Soliloquy (1:15)
  - Hamlet's Soliloquy (1:02)
  - The Three Witches from Macbeth (0:42)
  - Juliet's Soliloquy (0:55)
  - Funeral Oration from Julius Caesar (1:32)
- Introduction (0:13)
- Listen Here, Tyrannosaurus Rex (Peter Schickele) (1:55)

The album was recorded live at Gordon Center in Owings Mills, Baltimore County, Maryland, on June 16, 2007.

== Sources ==
- "P. D. Q. Bach & Peter Schickele: The Jekyll and Hyde Tour"
