= Whirly tube =

Whirling aerophone

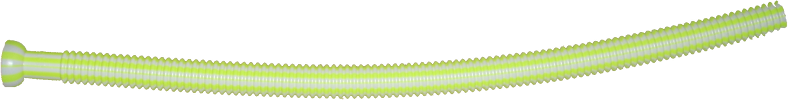
A whirly tube

Whirly tube sample
Three notes played on a whirly tube

The whirly tube, corrugaphone, or bloogle resonator, also sold as Free-Ka in the 1960s-1970s, is an experimental musical instrument which consists of a corrugated (ribbed) plastic tube or hose (hollow flexible cylinder), open at both ends and possibly wider at one end (bell), the thinner of which is rotated in a circle to play. It may be a few feet long and about a few inches wide. The faster the toy is swung, the higher the pitch of the note it produces, and it produces discrete notes roughly belonging to the harmonic series, like a valveless brass instrument generates different modes of vibration. However, the first and the second modes, corresponding to the fundamental and the second harmonics, are reported as being difficult to excite. To be played in concert the length of the tube must be trimmed to tune it.

According to the modified Hornbostel–Sachs organological system proposed by Roderic Knight it should be numbered as "A21.31" (twirled version) and as "A21.32" (blown version), described as "a corrugated or ribbed tube that produces overtones through turbulence" . In spite of being an aerophone, it is usually included in the percussion section of "sound effects" instruments, such as chains, clappers, and thunder sheets.

== Sound ==
A corrugated tube being whirled, the outside moves faster

Hopkin describes a single whirled corrugaphone as capable of producing three or four different pitches. Crawford describes harmonics two through seven as reachable while whirling, though seven takes, "great effort." Hopkin describes that with a corrugahorn, "with tubes of suitable length and diameters, the range extends well up the [harmonic] series, where the available tones are close together and you can, with practice, play quite melodically." In fact, since each sounding mode plays throughout a range of speeds (rather than at one specific speed), it is difficult to skip over harmonics, as this requires a jump in speed (rather than gradual change), though this is easily done using one's tongue and throat to interrupt the air flow with a corrugahorn. Many sales offers describe the tubes as producing up to five distinct notes (presumably the bugle scale: close to the harmonics 2, 3, 4, 5, and 6), and while higher modes may be possible, if hard work, dissonant adjacent harmonics may sound simultaneously, such as 15 and 16. The modes of a corrugated tube are usually lower than those of an uncorrugated tube of the same length and diameter, and, "audible vibration in the whirly tube appears only when air flow velocity exceeds a certain minimum, which may preclude the sounding of the fundamental or lower harmonics." The timbre of the notes produced by the whirly tube are, "almost all fundamental," according to Fourier analysis (similar to sine waves). Tubes longer than many feet may have one end whirled while held near its middle or may be held out a car window.

The equations describing the sound produced when the tube is whirled, as proposed by F.S. Crawford in 1973, as follows, proposes that the air flowing through the corrugations should produce a sound similarly to a scraping instrument, such as a "reco-reco", in which a stick is scratched against a surface with regularly spaced grooves. This would be the rationale for the formulas below. However this tentative model is not experimentally demonstrated or supported by the theory of sounding pipes in acoustics. On the contrary, the present theory of sound production in corrugated pipes refutes the assumptions by Crawford (1973).

$\text{frequency} = \frac{\text{bumps}}{\text{sec}} = \frac{\text{bumps}}{\text{inch}} \times \left(\text{air flow velocity in } \frac{\text{inches}}{\text{sec}}\right)$

$$\begin{align}
{} \\[1pt]
\text{flow velocity} & = \frac{\text{cm}}{\text{sec}} = \frac{\text{cm}}{\text{bump}} \times \frac{\text{bump}}{\text{sec}} \\[6pt]
& = \text{corrugation distance} \times \text{bump frequency}
\end{align}$$

Thus the faster the tube is swung or the more dense the corrugation the higher the pitch of the note produced.

The difference in speed between the moving end of the tube and the stationary, hand-held end creates a difference in air pressure. A higher pressure is at the fixed end and a lower pressure is at the moving end. This difference pulls air through the tube and the air's speed changes (making the changes in the tones) with the speed of the spin. The pitch, loudness, and tone of the sound come from the tube's length and diameter, the distance between each ridge, and the speed the tube spins around, which moves the air faster or slower through the tube changing the tone in steps. ... [Only corrugated tubes sing] As the air flows first over one ridge then over a second it tumbles into a vortex. The faster the air flows through the tube, the higher the frequency of the sound produced by the vortex. When the frequency of the vortex matches one of the natural resonant frequencies of the tube [harmonics], it is amplified.

According to Bernoulli's principle, as speed increases, pressure decreases; thus the air is sucked into the still or inside end of the tube as higher pressure air moves up the tube to fill the lower pressure air at the faster moving spinning or outside end of the tube.

The characteristic speed is the mean flow through the pipe U and the characteristic length must be a multiple of the spacing between corrugations, nL, where n is an integer number and L is the distance between corrugations. At low speeds, the unstable interior flow needs to travel several corrugations to establish the feedback loop. As the speed increases, the loop can be established with fewer corrugations. The Strouhal number

$$\mathrm{St} = \frac{f_n n L}{U}$$

was used as the scaling factor. A unique aspect of this whistle is that the internal flow carries both the unstable vortex downstream and the returning feedback signal upstream.

== Use ==
An ensemble of whirlies produces astounding musical patterns of vibrant clear pitch, sometimes hauntingly beautiful, sometimes dramatic, sometimes soft, sometimes strong and robust, but at all times inspiring and thought provoking.

— Northern Territory News, December 1984

A corrugated plastic tube whirling instrument became an instant, if short-lived, cultural phenomenon in late 1960s New York City under the name "Free-Ka", sold by street vendors, as captured by The New Yorker in 1970. It was used by Peter Brooks in the early 1970s in his production of Shakespeare's A Midsummer Night's Dream. It has been used by a number of artists including Scritti Politti, Peter Schickele, Frank Ticheli, Paul Simon, Macy Gray, Loch Lomond, and Yearbook Committee. Also in Brett Dean's Moments of Bliss (2004) and by The Cadets Drum and Bugle Corps in 2011. Donald Sosin's "137 Ridges" (1971) for flute, vibraphone and 15 tuned Free-kas was performed at the University of Michigan. It has been employed in some of Peter Schickele's comic P. D. Q. Bach compositions such as the Erotica Variations: IV (1979), Missa Hilarious (1975), and Shepherd on the Rocks with a Twist (1967). Schickele, who calls it the lasso d'amore (a pun on oboe d'amore), gives a tongue-in-cheek explanation of the instrument's evolution: 18th century Viennese cowboys twirled "their lariats over their heads with such great speed that a musical pitch was produced. . . . The modifications that had made this development possible rendered [the lasso] useless for roping cattle."

David Cope, in 1972, discussed a cugaphone, which, in 1997, he describes as an instrument built from a trumpet mouthpiece attached to a long piece of 3/8-inch bore plastic tubing with a kitchen funnel, usually in hand, at the other end acting as the bell; thus sound may be modulated by directing the funnel, applying pressure to the funnel, or by swinging the funnel around one's head and creating a Doppler effect. This version of the instrument would require brass embouchure technique rather than corrugation. By 1997 ensembles of cugaphones existed.

The inventor is not known, though Bart Hopkin credits the late Frank Crawford of the UC Berkeley Department of Physics with, "developing the idea and researching the underlying acoustics," and in 1973 Crawford credits another professor with pointing out to him a toy which, "about a year or two ago...appeared in toy stores across the land," and gives the brand or trade names "Whirl-A-Sound", "Freeka", and "The Hummer"; the last being made by W. J. Seidler Co. of L.A., CA. Crawford invented the method of playing a small enough example of such a corrugated hose by blowing, known as a corrugahorn. This requires a tube with a diameter smaller than commonly marketed as toys (a one inch diameter is too great, a half-inch is not), Hopkin recommends 3/8" gas heater hose as the most playable of widely available sizes. Crawford invented an "inverted-wastebasket water piston" operated version he called the "Water Pipe", with which he could easily reach the eleventh harmonic.

== See also ==
- Bullroarer: traditional long-distance communication instrument that makes a low roar when swung in a circle
- Boomwhacker: lightweight, hollow, plastic tube, tuned to a musical pitch by length
- Laminar–turbulent transition
- Pipe flow
- Whipcracking
