= Grand Serenade for an Awful Lot of Winds and Percussion =

Musical composition written by Peter Schickele

The ”Grand Serenade for an Awful Lot of Winds and Percussion” is a piece of music written by Peter Schickele, touted as a composition of the fictional P.D.Q. Bach. It consists of 4 movements, and is intended to be humorous to listen to. The players are instructed to play the piece sloppily, especially the fourth movement. The whole piece is about 10–11 minutes long. It was released on the album Music for an Awful Lot of Winds and Percussion.

== Movements ==
- Grand Entrance: A short movement with repeated lines by the whole band. The music is very simple to play.
- Simply Grand Minuet: Features some parts of the band playing with their mouthpieces only, to create a duck call effect. The lead trombonist plays a high part while the rest of the section plays a very low note, and a piccolo duet is featured as melody. At the end of the piece, the clarinet section takes water and gurgles a B-flat note.
- Romance in the Grand Manner: The melody of this piece is actually Old Folks at Home at a slower tempo.
- Rondo Mucho Grando: The final and longest movement of the four; it features a Crasho Grosso. This is where the percussionists are instructed to drop and tip over their instruments while making it appear to be an accident. The melody is very simple, accompanied by an upward scale. There are many references to other musical snippets, including a trombone playing a blues scale and the trumpet section playing the fanfare before a race begins. One quoted tune is "You Gotta Be a Football Hero," which is immediately turned into the opening theme of Beethoven's String Quartet No. 7. A siren then announces the end of the piece.

== Discography ==
- Music for an Awful Lot of Winds and Percussion (Telarc CD-80307 CS-30307)
- The Ill-Conceived P.D.Q. Bach Anthology (Telarc CD-80520) (excerpts)
