= Music for an Awful Lot of Winds and Percussion =

Studio album by P. D. Q. Bach
- Released: 1992
- Recorded: November 17, 1990; April 17, 1992; June 30, 1992
- Genre: Classical; Comedy
- Length: 52:52
- Label: Telarc

P. D. Q. Bach chronology
WTWP Classical Talkity-Talk Radio (1991)	Music for an Awful Lot of Winds and Percussion (1992)	Two Pianos Are Better Than One (1994)

Music for an Awful Lot of Winds and Percussion was released in 1992 by Telarc Records. The album contains one piece by Professor Peter Schickele writing under his own name and several pieces by him as P. D. Q. Bach.

This album won the Grammy Award for best comedy album in 1992. The runners-up were Naked Beneath My Clothes (Rita Rudner), Jonathan Winters is Terminator 3 (Jonathan Winters), An Evening with George Burns (George Burns) and Off the Deep End ("Weird Al" Yankovic).

== Performers ==
- Professor Peter Schickele, intellectual guide
- Turtle Mountain Naval Base Tactical Wind Ensemble
- Tennessee Bassoon Quartet
- David McGill, bassoon
- Ronald Bishop, tuba

Andrew Cleaver, baritone saxophone

== Track listing ==
- Introduction (1:22)
- Grand Serenade for an Awful Lot of Winds & Percussion, S. 1000
  - Grand Entrance (1:41)
  - Simply Grand Minuet (2:51)
  - Romance in the Grand Manner (2:37)
  - Rondo Mucho Grando (4:04, including the Crasho Grosso at the beginning of the movement and created by dropping a lot of percussion equipment)
- Introduction (1:04)
- "Dutch" Suite in G Major, S. -16
  - Mr. Minuit's Minuet (2:37)
  - Panther Dance (2:46)
  - Dance of the Grand Dams (2:49)
  - The Lowland Fling (2:13)
- Introduction (0:54)
- Six Contrary Dances, S. 39
  - Maestoso animoso (2:37)
  - Daintissimo (1:28)
  - Allegro, but not too mucho (2:15)
  - Molto moderato (2:06)
  - Vivace cucarace (0:44)
  - Moving right alongo (1:10)
- Introduction (0:56)
- Lip My Reeds, S. 32' (4:31)
- Door Prize Scene: Fanfare for Fred, S. F4F (2:20)
- Introduction (0:48)
- March of the Cute Little Wood Sprites, S. Onesy Twosy (3:51)
- Introduction (0:50)
- Last Tango in Bayreuth (Schickele) (2:42)
- Closing (0:32)

== Sources ==
- P.D.Q. Bach: Music for an Awful Lot of Winds and Percussion
