= Peter Schickele Presents an Evening with P. D. Q. Bach (1807–1742)? =

Peter Schickele Presents an Evening with P.D.Q. Bach (1807–1742)?

Live album by P.D.Q. Bach
- Released: 1965
- Label: Vanguard Records

P.D.Q. Bach chronology
Peter Schickele Presents an Evening with P.D.Q. Bach (1807–1742)? (1965)	An Hysteric Return: P.D.Q. Bach at Carnegie Hall (1966)

Peter Schickele Presents an Evening with P.D.Q. Bach (1807–1742)? was the first concert of and the first release of the music of Peter Schickele under his comical pseudonym of P.D.Q. Bach by Vanguard Records. The chamber orchestra was conducted by Jorge Mester. The album consists of musical parodies with commentaries by the composer.

== Recording ==
The recording was made at New York's The Town Hall at 8:30 P.M. on Saturday, April 24, 1965. Here, for the first time, the professor discussed his imagined studies of the life and "recently discovered" works of P.D.Q. Bach. Some of New York's finest musicians were on hand to give splendid performances, according to Howard Klein of The New York Times. Klein, realizing this was a one-time concert, hoped that a suitable foundation could be found to fund a nationwide tour.

Schickele made his first concert entrance sliding down a rope from the Town Hall balcony to the orchestra level and then taking the stage. Similar slapstick entrances became de rigueur at subsequent concerts.

The album was released as an LP in 1965 (Vanguard VMD 79195), and as a CD in 1987 (Vanguard VBD-79195). The 50th anniversary of this concert was commemorated at the same venue on December 28 and 29, 2015.

== Performers ==
- Professor Peter Schickele, Hardart, wine bottle, and ocarina
- Chamber orchestra under the direction of Jorge Mester:
- John Ferrante, bargain counter tenor
- Ralph Froelich, French horn
- Leonid Hambro, harpsichord
- Seymour Platt, trumpet mouthpiece
- Maurice Eisenstadt, bagpipes
- Robert Lewis, left-handed sewer flute
- Stanley Buetens, lute
- Stephen Lickman, double-reed slide music stand
- Peter Zolotareff, balalaika

== Track listing ==
1. Concerto for Horn and Hardart, S.27
  1. Allegro
  2. Tema con variazione
  3. Menuetto con Panna e Zucchero
2. Cantata: Iphigenia in Brooklyn, S.53162
  1. Aria: "As Hyperion across the flaming sky"
  2. Recitative: "And lo, she found herself within a market"
  3. Ground: "Dying, and yet in death alive"
  4. Recitative: "And in a vision, Iphigenia saw her brother, Orestes"
  5. Aria: "Running knows"
3. Quodlibet for Small Orchestra (by Peter Schickele)
  1. Allegro
  2. Adagio
  3. Allegro
4. Sinfonia Concertante, S.98.6
  1. Sehr Unruhig mit schmalz
  2. Andante senza moto
  3. Presto mit schleppend
