= Oedipus Tex =

Oratorio by P. D. Q. Bach

Oedipus Tex is a satirical Western-themed oratorio by P. D. Q. Bach that follows the adventures of Oedipus Tex ("you may have heard of my brother Rex") in Thebes Gulch. It was released on the album Oedipus Tex and Other Choral Calamities in 1990.

== Structure ==
Oedipus Tex is a dramatic oratorio for soloists, chorus and orchestra with the following scenes.

1. Prologue: "Tragedy"
  Recitative: "Well"
2. Aria with chorus: "Howdy there"
  Recitative: "And it wasn't long"
3. Duet with chorus: "My heart"
  Recitative: "But"
4. Aria: "You murdered your father"
  Recitative: "When Billie Jo heard"
5. Aria with chorus: "Goodbye"
  Recitative: "When Oedipus heard"
6. Chorus and Finale

== Performers ==
- Professor Peter Schickele, conductor, bass (title character)
- The Greater Hoople Area Off-Season Philharmonic, Newton Wayland, conductor
- The Okay Chorale
- Grandmaster Flab and the Hoople Funkharmonic
- Pamela South, soprano (Billie Jo Casta)
- Dana Krueger, mezzo-soprano (Madame Peep)
- Frank Kelley, tenor
- Brice Andrus, horn
