= An Hysteric Return: P.D.Q. Bach at Carnegie Hall =

Live album by P.D.Q. Bach
- Released: 1966
- Label: Vanguard Records

P.D.Q. Bach chronology
Peter Schickele Presents an Evening with P.D.Q. Bach (1807–1742)? (1965)	An Hysteric Return: P.D.Q. Bach at Carnegie Hall (1966)	Report from Hoople: P.D.Q. Bach on the Air (1967)

An Hysteric Return: P.D.Q. Bach at Carnegie Hall is a live recording of a P.D.Q. Bach concert in Carnegie Hall and was released on Vanguard Records in 1966.

== Performers ==
- Professor Peter Schickele, bicycle, windbreaker, tromboon
- The Royal P.D.Q. Bach Festival Orchestra, Jorge Mester, conductor
- Lorna Haywood, soprano
- Marlena Kleinman, alto
- John Ferrante, tenor
- William Woolf, bass
- The Okay Chorale, John Nelson, director
- Maurice Eisenstadt, bagpipes
- Robert Lewis, balloons

== Track listing ==
1. Oratorio — The Seasonings, S. 1½ tsp. (P.D.Q. Bach)

- Chorus: "Tarragon of virtue is full"
- Recitative: "And there were in the same country"
- Duet: "Bide thy thyme"
- Fugue
- Recitative: "Then asked he"
- Chorale: "By the leeks of Babylon, There we sat down, yea, we wept"
- Aria: "Open sesame seeds"
- Recitative: "So saying"
- Duet: "Summer is a cumin seed"
- Chorus with soloists: "To curry favor, favor curry"

2. "Unbegun" Symphony, (Prof. Schickele)

- III. Minuet
- IV. Andante — Allegro

3. Pervertimento for Bagpipes, Bicycle and Balloons, S. 66 (P.D.Q. Bach)

- Allegro moulto
- Romanze II (Adagio Sireno)
- Minaret and Trio
- Romanze I (Chi Largo)
- Presto Changio

== Sources ==
- An Hysteric Return: P.D.Q. Bach at Carnegie Hall, schickele.com
