= 1712 Overture and Other Musical Assaults =

1989 classical music comedy album by P.D.Q. Bach

Studio album by P. D. Q. Bach
- Released: 1989
- Recorded: January 10–11, 1989
- Genre: Classical; Comedy
- Length: 63:08
- Label: Telarc Records
- Producer: Elaine Martone

P. D. Q. Bach chronology
A Little Nightmare Music (1983)	1712 Overture and Other Musical Assaults (1989)	Oedipus Tex and Other Choral Calamities (1990)

1712 Overture and Other Musical Assaults is a classical music album released in 1989 by Telarc Records. The album contains works by P. D. Q. Bach, the alter ego of Professor Peter Schickele (as well as tracks credited to Schickele himself). It is scored for "really big orchestra and some not-quite so big ensembles, plus unique on-location introductions, spoken on the very historical spots where the actual history happened".

== Performers ==
- Professor Peter Schickele, conductor, narrator, pianist, devious instrumentalist and intellectual guide
- The Greater Hoople Area Off-Season Philharmonic, Walter Bruno, conductor
- I Virtuosi di Hoople

== Track listing ==
- Introduction (1:35)
- 1712 Overture, S. 1712 (11:33)
- Introduction (1:12)
- Bach Portrait (Schickele) (14:32)
- Introduction (2:53)
- Capriccio La Pucelle de New Orleans (The Maid of New Orleans), S. under 18 (3:25)
- Introduction (1:14)
- "Minuet Militaire", S. 1A (3:41)
- Introduction (1:33)
- Prelude to Einstein on the Fritz, S. e=mt² (6:37)
- Introduction (1:47)
- The Preachers of Crimetheus, a ballet in one selfless act, S. 988 (12:27)
  - Prologue (Bottomless Sorrow; Topless Gaiety) (3:18)
  - The Lamentations of Jerry Maja (3:06)
  - Finale: Special Deliverance (5:57)

== Awards ==
Grammy Awards
Year	Winner	Category
1990	1712 Overture and Other Musical Assaults	Best Comedy Album
