= The Definitive Biography of P.D.Q. Bach =

Book by Peter Schickele

- Author: Prof. Peter Schickele
- Language: English
- Genre: Biography, Music
- Publisher: Random House, New York
- Publication date: 1976
- Publication place: United States
- Media type: Print (Hardcover & Paperback)
- Pages: 238 pp. (hardcover edition)
- ISBN: 0-394-46536-9
- OCLC: 1694191
- Dewey Decimal: 813/.5/4
- LC Class: ML65 .S34

The Definitive Biography of P.D.Q. Bach (1807–1742)? is a book by Prof. Peter Schickele chronicling the life of fictitious composer P. D. Q. Bach.

== Table of Contents ==
- Dedication
- Preface
- Preface to the English Language Edition
- Foreword
- Introduction
- Author's Note
- Acknowledgements
- Table of Contents
- I. P.D.Q. Bach's Background: Cause or Effect?
  1. Early Infancy (1742–1745)
  2. Late Infancy (1745–1766)
  3. The Lost Years (1766–1777)
  4. The Turning Point (1777)
- II. The World of P.D.Q. Bach: A Pictorial Essay
- III. Man or Myth?: In Search of P.D.Q. Bach
- IV. "Such a Horrid Clang": An Annotated Catalogue of the Music of P.D.Q. Bach
  1. The Initial Plunge
  2. The Soused Period
  3. Contrition
  4. Undiscovered Works
- Appendices
  A. A Map of P.D.Q. Bach's Travels
  B. A Map of P.D.Q. Bach's Public Performances
  C. Charles Burney's Account of His Visit to Wein-am-Rhein in 1788
  D. Bibliography
  E. Analysis of the Two-Part Contraption
  F. Discography
  G. Glossary of Unusual Instruments Used by P.D.Q. Bach
  H. The Bach Family Tree
- Index

== Publication history ==
- 1976, US, Random House, ISBN 0-394-46536-9, Pub date April 1976, Hardcover
- 1977, US, Random House, ISBN 0-394-73409-2, Pub date 12 August 1977, Paperback
- 1996, US, Highbridge Audio, ISBN 1-56511-146-X, Pub date 1 June 1996, Audiobook
