= The Abduction of Figaro =

Opera by P. D. Q. Bach

The Abduction of Figaro is a comic opera in three acts, described as "A Simply Grand Opera by P. D. Q. Bach", by Peter Schickele. It is a parody of opera in general, and the title is a play on two operas by Wolfgang Amadeus Mozart: The Abduction from the Seraglio, K. 384, and The Marriage of Figaro, K. 492. Those two operas, as well as Così fan tutte and Don Giovanni, and Gilbert and Sullivan's The Pirates of Penzance are among the core inspirations for the piece. The Abduction of Figaro is numbered S. 384, 492 in Schickele's catalogue of works.

Schickele was commissioned to "discover" this opera by the Minnesota Opera, where the piece premiered on April 27 and 28, 1984. In addition to parodying Mozart, the music incorporates diverse influences and musical quotes, from traditional camp songs like "Found a Peanut" to popular songs like "Macho Man" by the Village People. The opera has been released on VHS and DVD.

== Roles ==
Roles, voice types, premiere cast
Role	Voice type	Premiere cast, 27 April 1984 Conductor of chorus, corpse de ballet, orchestra of the Minnesota Opera, the whole schmeer: Peter Schickele
Al Donfonso, Pasha Shaboom, Papa Geno	bass	Leroy Lehr
Susanna Susannadanna, Mama Geno	mezzo-soprano	Dana Krueger
Pecadillo	tenor	Bruce Edwin Ford
Donna Donna	soprano	Marilyn Brustadt
Blondie	soprano	Lisbeth Lloyd
Donald Giovanni	bass-baritone	Michael Burt
Schlepporello	almost-a-baritone	Jack Walsh
Captain Kadd	basso	Will Roy
Opec	bargain counter tenor	John Ferrante
Figaro	silent	Arthur Kaemmer
General Director		Edward Corn
Stage Director		Michael Montel
Choreographer		Larry Hayden
Set Designer		John Lee Beatty
Costume Designer		Gail Bakkom
Wig & Make-up Master		Richard Stead
Lighting Designer		Ruth Roberts
Video Editor		Daniel Mercure
Television Director		Kaye S. Lavine
Television Producer		Stephen Schmidt
The theme to Culture on Parade is performed by the London Serpent Trio.

Several characters' names and roles closely resemble those of characters found in Mozart operas:

- Figaro (retired haircutter): Figaro in The Marriage of Figaro
- Susanna Susannadanna (Figaro's wife): Susanna in The Marriage of Figaro
- Donald Giovanni (noble rapscallion): Don Giovanni in the opera of the same name
- Schlepporello (servant to Donald Giovanni): Leoporello, servant to Don Giovanni
- Donna Donna (jilted lady): Donna Elvira and Donna Anna in Don Giovanni
- Pecadillo (servant to Susanna): Pedrillo, servant to Belmonte in The Abduction from the Seraglio
- Blondie (servant to Donna Donna): Blonde, servant to Constanze in The Abduction from the Seraglio
- Pasha Shaboom (aphoristic ruler): Pasha Selim in The Abduction from the Seraglio
- Opec (servant to the Pasha): Osmin, groundskeeper for the Pasha Selim in The Abduction from the Seraglio
- Al Donfonso (doctor): Don Alfonso, a philosopher in Così fan tutte
- Papa Geno (swineherd): Papageno, a birdcatcher in The Magic Flute

Additionally, much of the first act takes place at the palace of the "Count and Countess Almamater", a reference to the Count and Countess Almaviva from The Marriage of Figaro, though neither character is physically seen in the opera.

== Synopsis ==
=== Act 1 ===
A dying Figaro lies in bed, attended by his wife Susanna, her servant Pecadillo, doctor Al Donfonso, and a chorus of townspeople. Donfonso detects a heartbeat after removing a couple of peanuts out of Figaro's shirt pocket. He says Figaro must get rest if he's going to live. Shortly after Donfonso leaves, Figaro sits up as if trying to say something but falls back down, prompting everyone to call the doctor back. Donfonso returns and applies medicinal leeches, much to everyone's disgust. He insists it was a treatment used on George Washington, but admits that Washington didn't survive (Introduction/"Found a peanut!").

Susanna is left alone with Figaro, who complains of back pain. Susanna places a pillow beneath him, then tearfully pleads for his recovery, supported by three doo-wop singers ("Stay with me"). A noble lady suddenly enters, stating that she is looking for a man named Donald Giovanni who has betrayed her ("Perfidy, thy name is Donald"). After being subdued by Susanna and Pecadillo, she introduces herself as Donna Donna. Pecadillo is immediately drawn to her servant, Blondie. All four express their views on love in a quartet ("Love is gone").

Outside, in the palace courtyard, Donald Giovanni arrives with his servant Schlepporello. Schlepporello wants to sing an aria, but Giovanni tells him he's a mute character and shouldn't even be speaking. Susanna and Blondie emerge on the balcony. While Pecadillo sings a serenade to Blondie while playing ukulele ("Behold, fair maiden"), Giovanni calls to Susanna, who eventually invites him inside ("Thy lofty tree").

Susanna shows Giovanni her husband lying asleep. Donfonso returns to check on Figaro. Donna Donna recognizes Giovanni and demands that he marry her or be shot. Before she can act, a pirate suddenly emerges from a chest and threatens to kill anyone who moves. He introduces himself as Captain Kadd ("My name is Captain Kadd") and announces he's "taking this ship to Cuba" in search of a hidden treasure. Donfonso awkwardly explains that they aren't on a ship, but rather in Figaro's bedroom, "in a town on the coast of Spain or Italy or somewhere". Undeterred, Kadd takes Figaro and his bed hostage and rolls out of the room. Everyone else laments about the situation, and Susanna dramatically faints from shock ("What a downer!").

Giovanni descends a ladder from the balcony, but Donna Donna is waiting for him outside. He assures her that he isn't trying to flee and that he is going to rescue Figaro ("No man"). He recruits the unwilling Pecadillo to join him and Schlepporello. At a dock, Giovanni and Pecadillo promise to be faithful to Donna Donna and Blondie and say goodbye ("Ah, though we must part"). The three men board a ship and sail off. Immediately, there's a storm, and the ship sinks in the distance (Act 1 finale).

=== Act 2 ===
Several days later, the men reach an unknown shore somewhere in the Turkish Empire ("God be praised"). They meet Opec, who sings a nonsensical song while picking various tropical fruit off of a single tree ("Fish gotta swim"). Opec tells the trio that they are at the palace of the Pasha Shaboom. The Pasha enters with his entourage ("Hey, make way"), and a group of dancers perform the Dance of the Seven Pails. Opec informs the Pasha of the three suspicious foreigners he has found, but the Pasha is clearly stoned and isn't bothered. After the Pasha and his company leave, Giovanni and Pecadillo express their admiration of two veiled women. However, the women reveal themselves as Donna Donna and Blondie in disguise and promptly leave, feeling insulted by the men's infidelity ("May I introduce").

Blondie and Donna Donna commiserate. Blondie laments that there aren't any faithful men, but Donna Donna still wants a man who will be true to her ("Macho, macho"). Pecadillo begs for Blondie's forgiveness while playing pedal steel guitar ("You can beat me"). Donna Donna angrily chases him away, but is interrupted by Giovanni, who insists that his heart still belongs to her. She initially succumbs to his advances, but quickly breaks off and denounces him. She becomes so angry that she breaks the fourth wall, telling the orchestra's conductor that "I'm not even going to sing my aria!" before storming offstage.

Giovanni tells Pecadillo and Schlepporello that it's time to continue their quest to rescue Figaro. Opec asks to join them, offering to provide a ship and crew. The quartet sets sail for Cuba, "the land of coconuts and rum" (Act 2 finale).

=== Act 3 ===
On a tropical island, there's a ballet which has nothing to do with the story. The four men enter, believing they're in an enchanted forest or perhaps dreaming, but Pecadillo decides they're simply lost ("A magic forest"). Schlepporello still wants to sing, but Giovanni harshly reminds him he's not allowed to.

The group meets Papa Geno and Mama Geno, a pair of poverty-stricken swineherds ("I am a swineherd"). They explain that they've been living on the island ever since they were in a shipwreck. Captain Kadd arrives, still with Figaro's bed. Kadd recognizes Papa Geno as his former ship's cook and receives a map from him. The directions lead to the bed, where everyone discovers that Figaro is missing. Where he was lying, though, is the Maltese Falcon. That's why Figaro's back was hurting; the treasure was in the bed the whole time.

Kadd discovers that the hollow statuette, which is supposed to contain the treasure, is empty and halts the performance midway through the opera's finale (Finale, part 1). He argues with the opera company's manager, who wants Kadd to go on and simply pretend that the treasure is there (despite the entire audience now knowing the truth), but Kadd insists the production is supposed to be fully staged. Schlepporello, now breaking character, reveals he has intentionally hidden the treasure and that he'll return it on the condition that he is allowed to sing, suggesting an aria of Donald Giovanni's that was "cut" from the second act during rehearsals. The manager gives in ("Why, oh why").

After an underwhelming vocal performance and tap dance, Schlepporello produces the treasure, and the finale concludes with Kadd celebrating his newly acquired wealth. An offstage narrator briefly summarizes the later lives of the main characters, such as Giovanni dying of "unnatural causes" and Figaro moving to Paris to start a newspaper (Finale, part 2).

== Musical numbers ==
1. Introductory remarks by Prof. Peter Schickele
2. Opening credits
3. Overture
Act 1: A town on the seacoast of Spain or Italy or somewhere
Scene 1: Figaro's bedroom in the palace of Count Almamater
4. Introduction: "Found a peanut!"
5. Recitative: "Ah, dear husband"
Aria: "Stay with me"
6. Recitative: "Suzanna"
7. Recitative: "Dog!"
Aria: "Perfidy, thy name is Donald"
8. Recitative: "I am distraught"
9. Quartet: "Love is gone"
Scene 2: A courtyard of the palace
10. Recitative: "Well, here we are"
11. Aria: "Behold, fair maiden"
12. Recitative: "Just a moment"
Duet: "Thy lofty tree"
Scene 3: Figaro's bedroom
13. Recitative: "And here is my husband"
14. Recitative: "Hold it!"
Aria: "My name is Captain Kadd"
15. Recitative: "Now that you've heard"
16. Sextet: "What a downer!"
Scene 4: The courtyard
17. Recitative: "Schlepporello"
Aria: "No man"
Scene 5: At the dock
18. Recitative: "What a strange turn of events"
19. Quintet and chorus: "Ah, though we must part"
20. Act 1 finale

21. Introduction to act 2
Act 2: Somewhere in the Turkish Empire
Scene 1: At the seashore
22. Duet: "God be praised"
Scene 2: In front of the Pasha's palace
23. Aria: "Fish gotta swim"
24. Chorus: "Hey, make way"
25. Dance of the Seven Pails
26. Recitative: "Your immenseness"
27. Duet, chorus, and dialogue: "Who is the highest"
28. Quartet: "May I introduce"
Scene 3: A courtyard of the palace
29. Dialogue and recitative: "Why?"
Aria and dialogue: "Macho, macho"
30. Cavatina and dialogue: "You can beat me"
31. Act 2 finale

Act 3: A tropical forest
32. Ballet
33. Trio and dialogue: "A magic forest"
34. Duet and dialogue: "I am a swineherd"
35. Finale (part 1) and dialogue
36. Aria and dialogue: "Why, oh why"
37. Finale (part 2)
38. Curtain calls and closing credits
39. Closing remarks by Prof. Schickele

DVD bonus tracks

- Excerpts from the Gross Concerto for Divers Flutes and Orchestra, S. −2
- Professor Peter Schickele in conversation with Gordon Hunt
