= Report from Hoople: P. D. Q. Bach on the Air =

Report from Hoople: P.D.Q. Bach on the Air

Studio album by P.D.Q. Bach
- Released: 1967
- Genres: Classical; Comedy
- Length: 49:51
- Label: Vanguard Records

P.D.Q. Bach chronology
An Hysteric Return: P.D.Q. Bach at Carnegie Hall (1966)	Report from Hoople: P.D.Q. Bach on the Air (1967)	The Stoned Guest (1970)

Report from Hoople: P.D.Q. Bach on the Air was released on Vanguard Records in 1967. It is set up as a radio broadcast of the music of P.D.Q. Bach with Professor Peter Schickele as the DJ.

In addition to P.D.Q. Bach music, the record includes "New Horizons in Music Appreciation", a piece in which Schickele and Robert Dennis do a play-by-play on a performance of the first movement of Beethoven's Fifth Symphony as if it were a sports game.

On the back cover, Schickele thanks "members of his graduate seminar in Accidental Originality" including future famous composer Philip Glass.

== Performers ==
- Professor Peter Schickele, conductor, announcer, worm (an instrument)
- I Virtuosi di Hoople
- John Ferrante, bargain counter tenor
- Robert Dennis, announcer
- Heinrich Seifenblase, piano
- Emmanuel Pedal, four-handed organist

== Radio Log ==
=== Bright and Early Show ===
Track 1 (8:12)

- 00:00 Signature theme (from Diverse Ayres on Sundrie Notions, S. 99 44/100)
- 00:16 Intro
- 01:34 Echo Sonata for Two Unfriendly Groups of Instruments, S. 99999999
- 04:52 Tag
- 05:00 Station break
- 05:18 Commercial: "Do You Suffer?" (from Diverse Ayres on Sundrie Notions, S. 99 44/100)

Track 2 (11:53)

- 08:10 New Horizons in Music Appreciation: Beethoven's Fifth Symphony (Schickele, with Robert Dennis)
- 16:58 Time
- 17:23 Weather
- 18:17 News

Track 3 (5:04)

- 20:00 Intro
- 20:44 Traumarai for Unaccompanied Piano, S. 13
- 24:11 Station break
- 24:26 Tag
- 24:44 Signature theme

=== Dull and Late Show ===
Track 4 (9:27)

- 00:00 Signature theme
- 00:40 Intro
- 01:09 Schleptet in E♭ major, S. 0
  - Molto Larghissimo – Allegro Boffo
  - Menuetto con Brio ma senza Trio
  - Adagio Saccharino
  - Yehudi Menuetto
  - Presto Hey Nonny Nonnio
- 08:55 Tag
- 09:22 Station break

Track 5 (7:22)

- 09:26 What's My Melodic Line? (featuring works by Archangelo Spumoni, fictitious composer)
- 14:30 Time
- 15:03 News

Track 6 (7:53)

- 16:45 Intro
- 17:26 Fugue in C minor (Fuga Vulgaris from the Toot Suite for Calliope Four Hands, S. 212°)
- 20:11 Tag
- 20:42 Station break
- 20:46 What's Happening in Home Economics (Beethoven's Revenge, containing a small selection from the middle of the first movement of Symphony No. 3 "Eroica")
- 21:34 Commercial: "If You Have Never" (from Diverse Ayres on Sundrie Notions, S. 99 44/100)
- 22:40 Sign-off
- 23:34 Signature theme

== Sources ==
- Report from Hoople: P.D.Q. Bach On The Air, schickele.com
