= Concerto for Horn and Hardart =

Composition by P. D. Q. Bach

The Concerto for Horn and Hardart, S. 27, is a 1965 work of Peter Schickele composing under the pseudonym P. D. Q. Bach. The work is a parody of the double concerto, a classical music genre in which two soloists are accompanied by an orchestra; in this concerto, one soloist is a conventional French horn, but the other, the hardart, is a fanciful keyboard that uses a variety of different toys and noisemakers, such as plucked strings, blown whistles and popped balloons, to produce each note in its range. The name "hardart" and including name of the concerto is a play on the name of proprietors Horn & Hardart, who pioneered the North American use of the automat. Like the automat, the hardart had small windows in the front where the musician had to insert coins to remove implements needed to strike or otherwise play the devices that produced the notes. The composer Philip Glass, a classmate of Schickele's, helped build the actual instrument; Glass and the others tasked with building the hardart made it a transposing instrument without telling Schickele, who had to transpose at sight during the performance. As with other works that Schickele attributed to P. D. Q. Bach, "beneath the satire one finds very sound technique and invention in the music."

The piece is in three movements:

1. Allegro con brillo
2. Tema con variazione
3. Menuetto con Panna e Zucchero

The first movement is in sonata form, though with numerous mishaps. It quotes the first movement from Wolfgang Amadeus Mozart's Symphony No. 29. The second is a set of variations which, as Schickele notes, have no relationship to the initial theme. It quotes second movement from Piano Concerto No. 21 (Mozart). It concludes with a cadenza that shows off the abilities of the hardart. The third movement, a minuet ("with cream and sugar"), ends with the bursting of the balloons on the hardart.

The concert was released on Schickele's first album, Peter Schickele Presents an Evening with P. D. Q. Bach (1807–1742)? (1965), with Schickele playing the Hardart and Jorge Mester conducting.

A portion of the cadenza was sampled by the group Jurassic 5 in the song "Monkey Bars" on their album Quality Control.

The inscription Minor Labor Matris on the hardart is Latin for "Less Work for Mother", the advertising slogan adopted by Horn & Hardart in 1924.
