= Yearbook Committee =

Band from Indiana, United States

- Origin: Terre Haute, Indiana, United States
- Genres: Folk, folk rock
- Years active: 2009–present
- Label: Unsigned
- Members: Christina Blust, Jon DaCosta, Travis Dillon, David Goodier, Brad Lone, Rachel Rasley
- Past members: John Murray, Jimmy Rinehart
- Website: www.yearbookcommittee.org

Yearbook Committee is a folk/folk rock band from Terre Haute, Indiana founded in May 2009. Current band members are Christina Blust, Jon DaCosta, Travis Dillon, David Goodier, Brad Lone and Rachel Rasley, all of whom share songwriting and lead vocal performance duties. The band is known for its wide range of musical styles. In addition to standard musical instruments such as guitar, banjo, accordion, french horn, and varied percussion, Yearbook Committee has also utilized five gallon buckets, sheet metal, whirly tubes and kazoos.

In addition to their concert schedule, Yearbook Committee has been active in its local community, performing at events for local non-profits including Arts Illiana, Downtown Terre Haute and White Violet Center for Eco-Justice. The band has also contributed several music videos to Folked Up! (in Terre Haute), a series of videos highlighting Wabash Valley musicians. They were an official showcasing artist at the 2011 and 2012 South by Southwest Music Festival and have also played other regional festivals, including Blues at the Crossroads and Midpoint Music Festival.

== History ==
Prior to the formation of Yearbook Committee, all of its members were active participants of Terre Haute's music scene. DaCosta also plays with Cuba, Goodier with Nativemind, and Dillon with D-railed. Blust and DaCosta have released solo albums, DaCosta's under the moniker Marquette Ave.

The first Yearbook Committee collaborations were recording sessions, mainly in DaCosta's garage. The band started performing live shows in late 2009.

== Discography ==
- This is the Winter (2012)
- Sing Till You Die (2011)
- Big Couch EP (2010)
