= A Little Nightmare Music =

Studio album by P. D. Q. Bach (Peter Schickele)
- Released: 1983
- Label: Vanguard Records

P. D. Q. Bach (Peter Schickele) chronology
Music You Can't Get Out of Your Head (1982)	A Little Nightmare Music (1983)	1712 Overture and Other Musical Assaults (1989)

A Little Nightmare Music is an opera in "one irrevocable act" by Peter Schickele under the pseudonym he uses for parodies and comical works P. D. Q. Bach. The title of the work refers to the English translation of Mozart's famous Eine kleine Nachtmusik (A Little Night Music). The opera is described as being "based on a dream he had December 4, 1791, the night that Wolfgang Amadeus Mozart died and Antonio Salieri didn't." The opera was "newly exhumed" (a.k.a. premiered) at Carnegie Hall on December 27, 1982. It was later recorded with the premiere cast and released on CD by Vanguard Records in 1983. The album also includes two other works by P. D. Q. Bach: an octet (Octoot for wind instruments) and a parody of Handel's Water Music and Music for the Royal Fireworks, Royal Firewater Musick.

== Performers ==
- Professor Peter Schickele conducting the New York Pick-Up Ensemble
- James Billings, baritone (Antonio Salieri, a successful composer)
- Bruce Ford, tenor (Peter Schläfer, a mysterious writer)
- Gerald Tarack, violinist (Wolfgang Amadeus Mozart, a not-successful composer)
- Paul Dunkel, flute
- Susan Palma, flute
- Steve Taylor, oboe
- Pamela Epple, oboe
- Charles Russo, clarinet
- John Moses, clarinet
- Lauren Goldstein, bassoon
- Jane Taylor, bassoon

== Recording ==
A recording of the original cast of the opera was made. Since the opera is short, the recording also includes two other works by P.D.Q. Bach, Octoot for wind instruments, S. 8 and Royal Firewater Musick, for bottles and orchestra (original version), S. 1/5. The track listing is as follows:

- A Little Nightmare Music, an opera in one irrevocable act, S. 35
  - Aria: "What sweet music" (Salieri)
  - Aria: "Nature gave us eyes" (Schläfer)
  - Duet: "Uh Oh"
  - Finale: "What hutzpah!"
- Octoot for wind instruments, S. 8
  - Vite, tout de suite
  - Lent, tout au moins
  - Minuet et, tout à l'heure, trio
  - Chanson: "Toute l'année, hey, hey, hey"
  - Tout à coup le bout
- Royal Firewater Musick for bottles and orchestra, S. 1/5
  - Long; neat; long
  - March on the rocks
  - Minuet with a twist
  - Sarabande straight up
  - One for the road

== Sources ==
- P.D.Q. Bach: A Little Nightmare Music
