= Dorothea Moore (author) =

British author and playwright

- Moore from a 1929 newspaper
- Born: Dorothea Mary Moore; 1881; London, England
- Died: 5 May 1933 (aged 51–52); Chesham, Buckinghamshire, England
- Education: Cheltenham Ladies' College
- Occupation: Author

Dorothea Mary Moore (1881 – 5 May 1933) was an author of children's and historical novels and a playwright. She was called a "faithful portrayer of the English schoolgirl." She published the first Girl Guide novel, Terry, the Girl Guide, in 1912.

== Personal life ==
Moore was born to Rev. W Moore. She had two sisters and one brother and grew up in Kingston Deverill, Wiltshire. She worked as an actress with the Alex Maclean Company in 1911 and 1912. During World War I she volunteered with the Voluntary Aid Detachment at Malling House Hospital in Kent. She was in delicate health and lived with her brother, a doctor. She was a supporter of the Primrose League and a member of the Women's Writers Club. She was buried at Horn Hill Church, Chalfont St. Peter.

== Writing ==
Many of Moore's books were published by S W Partridge and Co. Her works were translated into Norwegian, Swedish, Danish and French. She was also published in America. She published The Dorothea Moore Omnibus in 1931. As well as writing stand-alone books, Moore made contributions to Children's Friend magazine, the British Girls' Annual, the Girl's Own Paper and Little Folks. In 1924 she started editing a column "for cripple children in hospital wards" for The Cripples Journal.

== Books ==
=== Historical novels ===
- Mistress Dorothy (1902)
- God's Bairn (1904)
- Evelyn (1904)
- Brown: A Story of Waterloo (1905)
- Sidney Lisle; Or the Heiress of St Quentin (1905)
- Elizabeth's Angel (1907)
- Jepthah's Lass (1907)
- Knights of the Red Cross (1907)
- Pamela's Hero (1907)
- My Lady Bellamy (1909)
- The Luck of Ledge Point (1909)
- The Christmas Children (1909)
- Lady of Mettle (1910)
- The Giant's Finger (1911)
- Under the Wolf's Fell (1911)
- Nadia to the Rescue (1912)
- When the Moon is Green (1913)
- A Brave little Royalist (1913)
- Rosemary the Rebel (1913)
- Captain Nancy (1914)
- Cecily's Highwayman (1914)
- Wanted: An English Girl (1916)
- A Nest of Malignants (1919)
- In the Reign of the Red Cap (1924)
- Z House (1925)
- My Lady Venturesome (1926)
- Perdita, Prisoner of War (1926)
- Adventurers All! (1927)
- The Wrenford Tradition (1929)
- Queens for Choice (1934)

=== Schoolgirl novels ===
- A Plucky School Girl (1908)
- The Making of Ursula (1909)
- The Lucas Girls; or The Man of the Family (1911)
- A Runaway Princess: Or HRH Smith at School (1912)
- Septima School Girl (1914)
- Schoolgirl Honour (1916)
- The New Girl (1917)
- The Head Girl's Sister (1918)
- The Head of the Lower School (1919)
- The Right Kind of Girl (1920)
- The New Prefect (1921)
- An Adventurous Schoolgirl (1921)
- The New Girl at Pen-y-gant (1922)
- Tam of Tiffany's (1923)
- The Only Day Girl (1923)
- A Schoolgirl Adventurer: A Story of the '45 (1927)
- At Friendship's Call (1932)
- Nicky of Nine Schools (1932)

=== Girl Guides ===
- Terry, the Girl Guide (1912)
- Guide Gilly Adventurer (1922)
- A Young Pretender (1924)
- Greta of the Guides (1926)
- Brenda of Beech House (1927)
- Adventurers Two (1929)
- Judy Patrol Leader (1930)
- Judy Lends a Hand (1932)
- Sara to the Rescue (1932)

=== Plays ===
- A Pageant of Empire (1910)
- My Lady Bellamy (1910) – produced at Woolwich Theatre Royal
- Primrose League Pageant (1911) – produced at Shaftesbury Theatre
- The lasses of Culverhouse (1921)
- Lilies or Lavender (1929)

== Girl Guides ==
Moore joined the Girl Guide movement in its infancy. She became captain of a Guide company in Eastbourne, whose members included Tirzah Garwood in the 1920s. She went on to become a Guide commissioner. Her book Terry, the Girl Guide (1912) was the first Girl Guide novel to be published, with a foreword by Agnes Baden-Powell, the Guide president. Moore's story Guide Gilly was featured in The Guide magazine, resulting in a stand-alone novel in 1922. She also contributed to The Girl Guides' Book in 1923 and 1926.

== See also ==
- Cadogan, Mary: You're a Brick, Angela! A New Look at Girls' Fiction from 1839 – 1975 (1976) Pub. Gollancz
- Mitchell, Sally: The New Girl: Girls' Culture in England 1880-1915 (1995) Pub. Columbia University
