= Hubert Unverricht =

German musicologist

Hubert Johannes Unverricht (4 July 1927 – 14 August 2017) was a German musicologist and a lecturer at various universities.

== Life ==
Unverricht worn in Liegnitz. After the Flight and expulsion of Germans in 1946 and a short stay in the Kleinwelka camp near Bautzen, he passed his Abitur in Großenhain in 1947. He then studied musicology (music history, systematic musicology and music ethnology), German studies and philosophy at the Humboldt University Berlin until 1951. In 1952, he moved to the Free University of Berlin, where he completed his studies in 1953 with the dissertation Hörbare Vorbilder in der Instrumentalmusik bis 1750. Untersuchungen der Vorgeschichte der Programmmusik.

After completing his doctorate, Unverricht worked at the Berlin Berlin Musical Instrument Museum and then in the foreign department of the GEMA in Berlin. From 1956 to 1962, he was a research assistant at the Joseph Haydn Institute in Cologne. In the winter semester of 1962/63, he moved to the Johannes Gutenberg University in Mainz as a research assistant at the Musicological Institute. There he habilitated in 1967 with a thesis on the Geschichte des Streichtrios (Mainzer Studien zur Musikwissenschaft 2, Tutzing 1969) and became a private lecturer in musicology and music history. IN 1980-1990, he took over the chair of musicology at the Catholic University of Eichstätt-Ingolstadt.

His main areas of research were the period from 1600 onwards, especially the period of classical and early romanticism, the history of chamber music, the regional music history of the Rhineland, Bavaria and Silesia, as well as source studies and editing techniques and musical copyright.

Unverricht was a founding member of the collecting society VG Musikedition and member of the first board of directors of the VG Musikedition (from 1966 to 1973). In 2000, he was appointed honorary member of the VG Musikedition.

Among the offices and honorary posts that have not been filled, those for the Arbeitsgemeinschaft für mittelrheinische Musikgeschichte (1974-1980) and the Stiftung Kulturwerk Schlesien in Würzburg stand out. Since 2004, he had been honorary chairman of the Historical Commission for Silesia, honorary member of the Friends and Sponsors of the Kulturwerk Schlesien and the Historical Society Liegnitz. From 1995 to 2001, he was also vice president and president of the Heimatwerk Schlesischer Katholiken.

== Publications ==
Unverricht's list of publications contains over 800 titles. Further details can be found in the Festschriften dedicated to him as well as in biographical articles about him.

- Kammermusik im 20. Jahrhundert zum Bedeutungswandel d. Begriffs.
- Barytontrios : Nr. 25-48 : Kritischer Bericht.

== Festschriften and honours ==
- Festschrift Hubert Unverricht zum 65. Geburtstag, edited by Karlheinz Schlager, Tutzing: Schneider 1992 (Eichstätter Abhandlungen zur Musikwissenschaft).
- Gundolf Keil, Akademischer Festakt zum 75. Geburtstag von Hubert Unverricht, in Schlesischer Kulturspiegel 37 (2002), p. 45.
