= Hoople, North Dakota =

- City
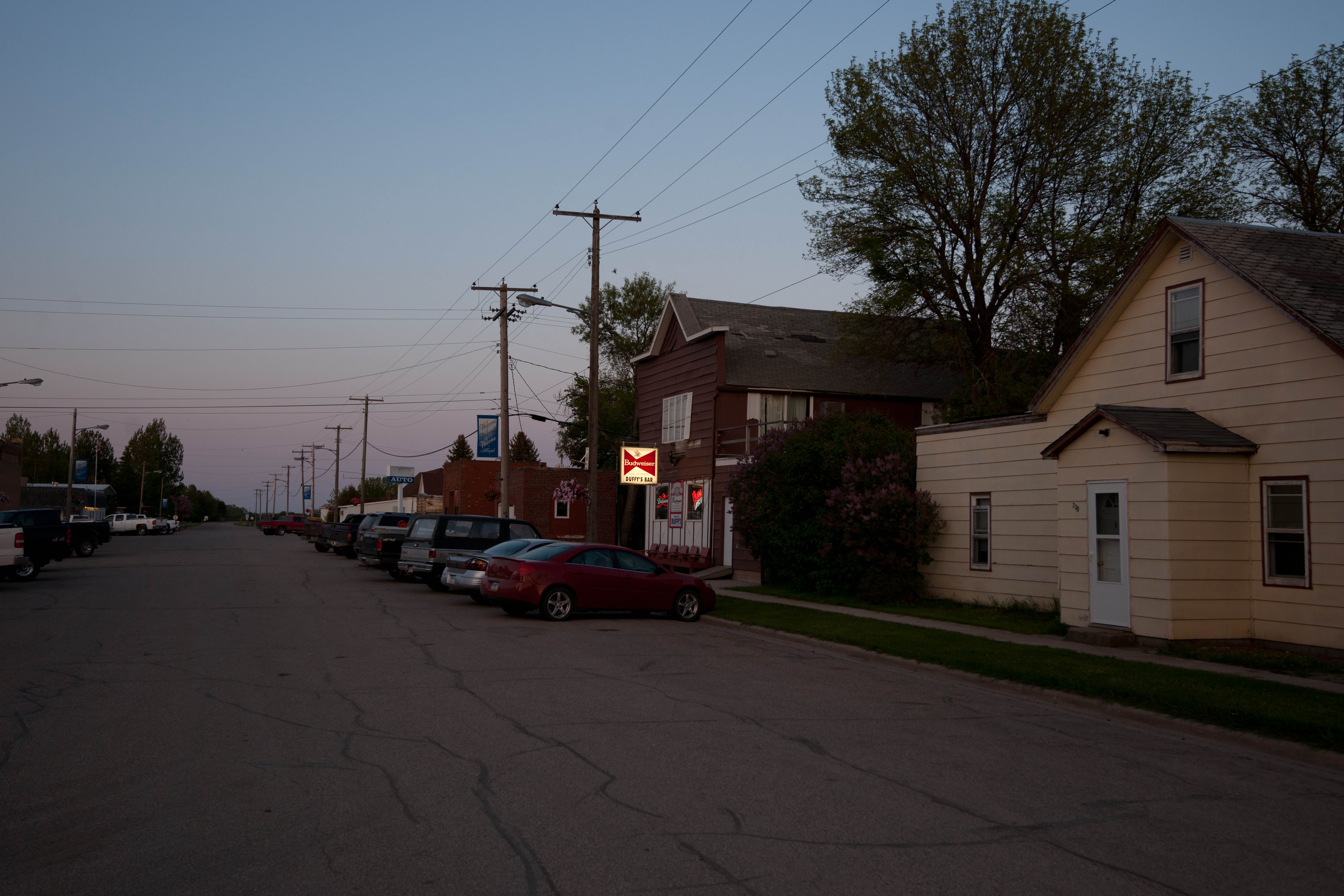
- Hoople at dusk, 2006
- Nickname: Tater Town, USA
- Location of Hoople, North Dakota
- Coordinates: 48°32′09″N 97°38′20″W
- Country: United States
- State: North Dakota
- County: Walsh
- Founded: 1889

Area
  - Total: 0.54 sq mi (1.40 km^{2})
  - Land: 0.54 sq mi (1.40 km^{2})
  - Water: 0 sq mi (0.00 km^{2})
- Elevation: 896 ft (273 m)

Population (2020)
  - Total: 247
  - Estimate (2022): 247
  - Density: 456.6/sq mi (176.29/km^{2})
- Time zone: UTC-6 (Central (CST))
  - Summer (DST): UTC-5 (CDT)
- ZIP code: 58243
- Area code: 701
- FIPS code: 38-38780
- GNIS feature ID: 1036093

Hoople is a city in Walsh County, North Dakota, United States. The population was 247 at the 2020 census. Hoople, named for early settler Alan Hoople, was founded in 1889. Hoople's nickname is "Tater Town."

== Geography ==
According to the United States Census Bureau, the city has a total area of 0.36 square miles (0.93 km^{2}), all land.

== Demographics ==
Historical population
Census	Pop.	Note	%±
1900	174		—
1910	175		0.6%
1920	250		42.9%
1930	325		30.0%
1940	346		6.5%
1950	447		29.2%
1960	334		−25.3%
1970	330		−1.2%
1980	350		6.1%
1990	310		−11.4%
2000	292		−5.8%
2010	242		−17.1%
2020	247		2.1%
2022 (est.)	247		0.0%
U.S. Decennial Census; 2020 Census

=== 2010 census ===
As of the census of 2010, there were 242 people, 115 households, and 63 families living in the city. The population density was 672.2 inhabitants per square mile (259.5/km^{2}). There were 135 housing units at an average density of 375.0 per square mile (144.8/km^{2}). The racial makeup of the city was 93.0% White, 6.6% from other races, and 0.4% from two or more races. Hispanic or Latino of any race were 9.1% of the population.

There were 115 households, of which 25.2% had children under the age of 18 living with them, 43.5% were married couples living together, 6.1% had a female householder with no husband present, 5.2% had a male householder with no wife present, and 45.2% were non-families. 41.7% of all households were made up of individuals, and 18.3% had someone living alone who was 65 years of age or older. The average household size was 2.10 and the average family size was 2.87.

The median age in the city was 44 years. 21.5% of residents were under the age of 18; 8.4% were between the ages of 18 and 24; 20.6% were from 25 to 44; 34.7% were from 45 to 64; and 14.9% were 65 years of age or older. The gender makeup of the city was 51.2% male and 48.8% female.

=== 2000 census ===
As of the census of 2000, there were 292 people, 133 households, and 79 families living in the city. The population density was 817.0 inhabitants per square mile (315.4/km^{2}). There were 148 housing units at an average density of 414.1 per square mile (159.9/km^{2}). The racial makeup of the city was 97.60% White, 0.68% Native American, 0.34% Asian, and 1.37% from two or more races. Hispanic or Latino of any race were 4.45% of the population.

There were 133 households, out of which 27.8% had children under the age of 18 living with them, 45.9% were married couples living together, 9.8% had a female householder with no husband present, and 40.6% were non-families. 39.8% of all households were made up of individuals, and 22.6% had someone living alone who was 65 years of age or older. The average household size was 2.20 and the average family size was 2.96.

In the city, the population was spread out, with 24.3% under the age of 18, 7.9% from 18 to 24, 24.0% from 25 to 44, 25.3% from 45 to 64, and 18.5% who were 65 years of age or older. The median age was 43 years. For every 100 females, there were 82.5 males. For every 100 females age 18 and over, there were 85.7 males.

The median income for a household in the city was $29,250, and the median income for a family was $38,125. Males had a median income of $26,786 versus $21,094 for females. The per capita income for the city was $14,836. About 6.0% of families and 11.8% of the population were below the poverty line, including 14.8% of those under the age of eighteen and 21.7% of those 65 or over.

== Notable people ==
- Lynn Frazier, governor of North Dakota and United States Senator
- Peter Schickele, creator of the fictional P. D. Q. Bach, composer and self-described "professor" at the "University of Southern North Dakota, Music Pathology Department"
