= P. D. Q. Bach =

Fictitious composer

P.D.Q. Bach
- Portrait of P.D.Q. Bach album cover
- First appearance: Peter Schickele Presents an Evening with P.D.Q. Bach (1807–1742)?; April 24, 1965
- Last appearance: P.D.Q. Bach: The Golden Anniversary; December 29, 2015
- Created by: Peter Schickele
- Portrayed by: Peter Schickele

In-universe information
- Occupation: Composer
- Family: Johann Sebastian Bach (father); Anna Magdalena Bach (mother); Johann Christian Bach (brother); Carl Philipp Emanuel Bach (brother); Johann Christoph Friedrich Bach (brother)
- Nationality: German

P.D.Q. Bach is a fictional composer created by the American composer and musical satirist Peter Schickele for a five-decade career performing the "discovered" works of the "only forgotten son" of the Bach family. Schickele's music combines parodies of musicological scholarship, the conventions of Baroque and Classical music, and slapstick comedy. The name P.D.Q. is a parody of the three-part names given to some members of the Bach family that are commonly reduced to initials, such as C.P.E. for Carl Philipp Emanuel Bach; PDQ is an initialism for "pretty damned quick".

Schickele began working on the character while studying at the Aspen Music Festival and School and Juilliard, and performed a variety of P.D.Q. Bach shows over many years. The Village Voice mentions the juxtaposition of collage, bitonality, musical satire, and orchestral surrealism in a "bizarre melodic stream of consciousness ... In P.D.Q. Bach he has single-handedly mapped a musical universe that everyone knew was there and no one else had the guts (not simply the bad taste) to explore."

In 2012, Schickele reduced his touring due to age. On December 28 and 29, 2015, at The Town Hall in New York, he performed two concerts to commemorate the 50th anniversary of his first concert. Schickele died on January 16, 2024, aged 88.

== Biography ==
Schickele wrote a humorous fictional biography of the composer according to which P.D.Q. Bach was born in Leipzig on April 1, 1742, the son of Johann Sebastian Bach and Anna Magdalena Bach; the twenty-first of Johann Sebastian's twenty children. He is also referred to as "the youngest and oddest of Johann Sebastian's 20-odd children". He died May 5, 1807, though his birth and death years are often listed on album literature in reverse, as "(1807–1742)?". According to Schickele, P.D.Q. "possessed the originality of Johann Christian, the arrogance of Carl Philipp Emanuel, and the obscurity of Johann Christoph Friedrich".

== Music ==
Schickele's works attributed to P.D.Q. Bach often incorporate comical rearrangements of well-known works of other composers. The works use instruments not normally used in orchestras, such as the bagpipes, slide whistle, kazoo, and fictional or experimental instruments such as the pastaphone (made of uncooked manicotti), tromboon, hardart, lasso d'amore, and left-handed sewer flute.

There is often a startling juxtaposition of styles within a single P.D.Q. Bach piece. The Prelude to Einstein on the Fritz, which alludes to Philip Glass's opera Einstein on the Beach, provides an example. The underlying music is Johann Sebastian Bach's first prelude from The Well-Tempered Clavier, but at double the normal speed, with each phrase repeated interminably in a minimalist manner that parodies Glass. On top of this mind-numbing structure is added everything from jazz phrases to snoring to heavily harmonized versions of "Three Blind Mice" to the chanting of a meaningless phrase ("Coy Hotsy-Totsy", alluding to the art film Koyaanisqatsi for which Glass wrote the score). Through all these mutilations, the piece never deviates from Bach's original harmonic structure.

The humor in P.D.Q. Bach music often derives from violation of audience expectations, such as repeating a tune more than the usual number of times, resolving a musical chord later than usual or not at all, unusual key changes, excessive dissonance, or sudden switches from high art to low art. Further humor is obtained by replacing parts of certain classical pieces with similar common songs, such as the opening of Brahms's Symphony No. 2 with "Beautiful Dreamer", or rewriting Tchaikovsky's 1812 Overture as the 1712 Overture with "Yankee Doodle" replacing Tchaikovsky's melody and "Pop Goes the Weasel" replacing "La Marseillaise".

=== Compositional periods ===
Schickele divides P.D.Q. Bach's fictional musical output into three periods: the Initial Plunge, the Soused Period, and Contrition. During the Initial Plunge, P.D.Q. Bach wrote the Traumarei for unaccompanied piano, an Echo Sonata for "two unfriendly groups of instruments", and a Gross Concerto for Divers Flutes, two Trumpets, and Strings. During the Soused (or Brown-Bag) Period, P.D.Q. Bach wrote a Concerto for Horn and Hardart (a pun on the name of a chain of automat restaurants), a Sinfonia Concertante, a Pervertimento for Bicycle, Bagpipes, and Balloons, a Serenude, a Perückenstück (literally German for "Wigpiece"), a Suite from The Civilian Barber (spoofing Rossini's The Barber of Seville), a Schleptet in E-flat major, the half-act opera The Stoned Guest (the character of "The Stone Guest" from Mozart's Don Giovanni, and the play by Pushkin), a Concerto for Piano vs. Orchestra, Erotica Variations (Beethoven's Eroica Variations), Hansel and Gretel and Ted and Alice, an opera in one unnatural act (Humperdinck's Hansel and Gretel and the 1969 film Bob & Carol & Ted & Alice), The Art of the Ground Round (Bach's The Art of Fugue), a Concerto for Bassoon vs. Orchestra, and a Grand Serenade for an Awful Lot of Winds and Percussion.

During the Contrition Period, P.D.Q. Bach wrote the cantata Iphigenia in Brooklyn (Gluck's Iphigenia in Aulis, etc.), the oratorio The Seasonings (Vivaldi's The Four Seasons), Diverse Ayres on Sundrie Notions, a Sonata for Viola Four Hands, the chorale prelude Should, a Notebook for Betty Sue Bach (Bach's Notebook for Anna Magdalena Bach and Buddy Holly's "Peggy Sue"), the Toot Suite, the Grossest Fugue (Beethoven's Grosse Fuge), a Fanfare for the Common Cold (Copland's Fanfare for the Common Man) and the canine cantata Wachet Arf! (Bach's Wachet auf).

A final work is the mock religious work Missa Hilarious (Beethoven's Missa Solemnis) (Schickele no. N_{2}O – the chemical formula of nitrous oxide or "laughing gas").

== Tromboon ==
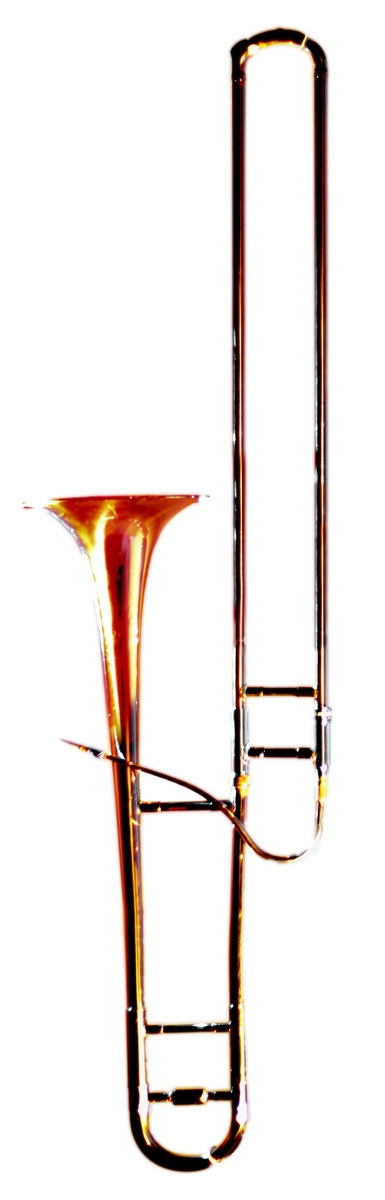
Tromboon

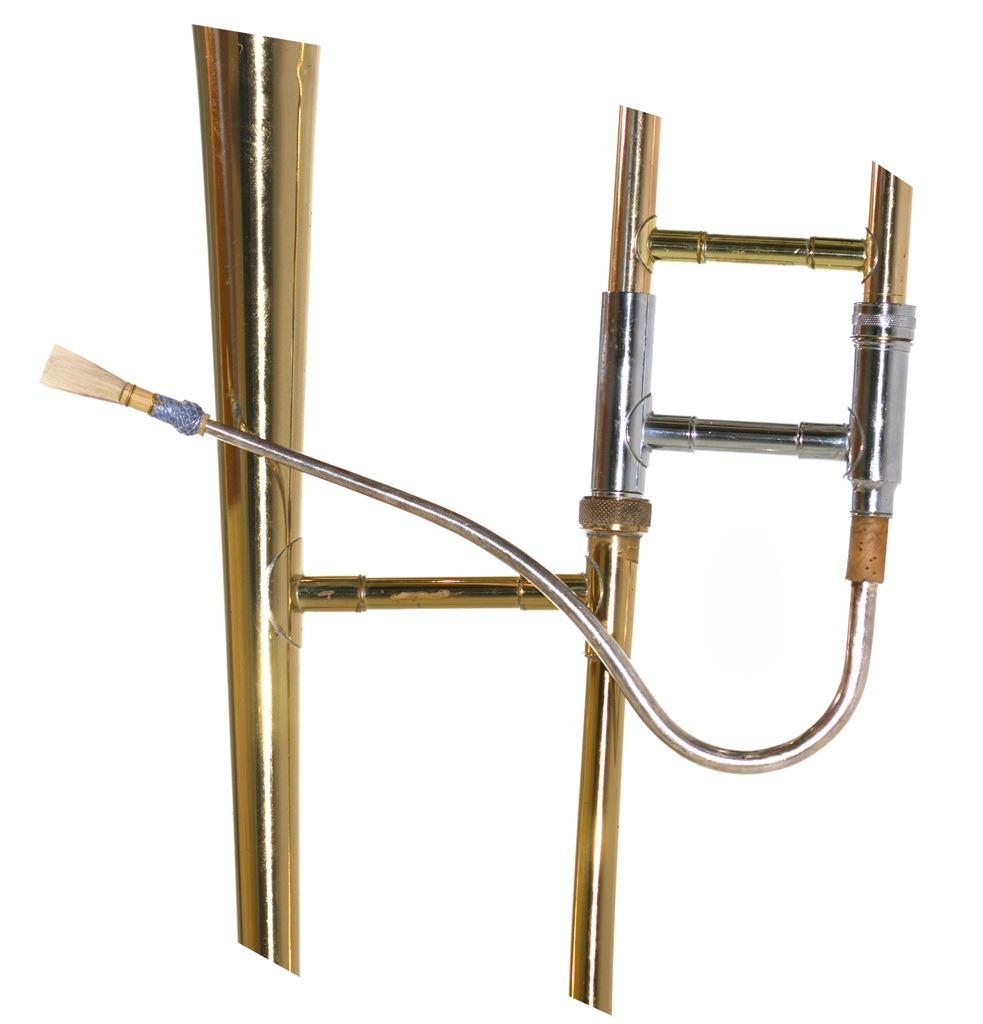
Tromboon detail (bassoon reed on the left)

The tromboon is a musical instrument made up of the reed and bocal of a bassoon, attached to the body of a trombone in place of the trombone's mouthpiece. It combines the sound of double reeds and the slide for a distinctive and unusual instrument. The name of the instrument is a portmanteau of "trombone" and "bassoon". The sound quality of the instrument is best described as comical and loud.

The tromboon was developed by Peter Schickele, a skilled bassoonist himself, and featured in some of his live concert and recorded performances. Schickele called it "a hybrid – that's the nicer word – constructed from the parts of a bassoon and a trombone; it has all the disadvantages of both". This instrument is called for in the scores of P.D.Q. Bach's oratorio The Seasonings, as well as the Serenude (for devious instruments) and Shepherd on the Rocks, With a Twist.

== Works ==
Albums
Title	Record company	Year
Peter Schickele Presents an Evening with P.D.Q. Bach (1807–1742)?	Vanguard Records	1965
An Hysteric Return: P.D.Q. Bach at Carnegie Hall	Vanguard Records	1966
Report from Hoople: P.D.Q. Bach on the Air	Vanguard Records	1967
The Stoned Guest	Vanguard Records	1970
The Intimate P.D.Q. Bach	Vanguard Records	1974
Portrait of P.D.Q. Bach	Vanguard Records	1977
Black Forest Bluegrass	Vanguard Records	1979
Liebeslieder Polkas	Vanguard Records	1980
Music You Can't Get Out of Your Head	Vanguard Records	1982
A Little Nightmare Music	Vanguard Records	1983
1712 Overture and Other Musical Assaults	Telarc Records	1989
Oedipus Tex and Other Choral Calamities	Telarc Records	1990
WTWP Classical Talkity-Talk Radio	Telarc Records	1991
Music for an Awful Lot of Winds and Percussion	Telarc Records	1992
Two Pianos Are Better Than One	Telarc Records	1994
The Short-Tempered Clavier and other dysfunctional works for keyboard	Telarc Records	1995
P.D.Q. Bach and Peter Schickele: The Jekyll and Hyde Tour	Telarc Records	2007

Compilations
Title	Record company	Year
The Wurst of P.D.Q. Bach	Vanguard Records	1971
The Dreaded P.D.Q. Bach Collection	Vanguard Records	1996
The Ill-Conceived P.D.Q. Bach Anthology	Telarc Records	1998

Video releases
Title	Year
The Abduction of Figaro	1984
P.D.Q. Bach in Houston: We Have a Problem!	2006

Books
Title	Publisher	Year
The Definitive Biography of P.D.Q. Bach	Random House	1976

== Awards ==
P.D.Q. Bach recordings received four successive Grammy Awards in the Best Comedy Album category from 1990 to 1993. Schickele also received a Grammy nomination in the Best Comedy Album category in 1996 for his abridged audiobook edition of The Definitive Biography of P.D.Q. Bach.

== See also ==
- Johann Sebastian Mastropiero
- Johann Gambolputty, a character from episode 6 of Monty Python's Flying Circus
- Peter Planyavsky
