= Peter Schickele =

American composer, musical educator and parodist (1935–2024)

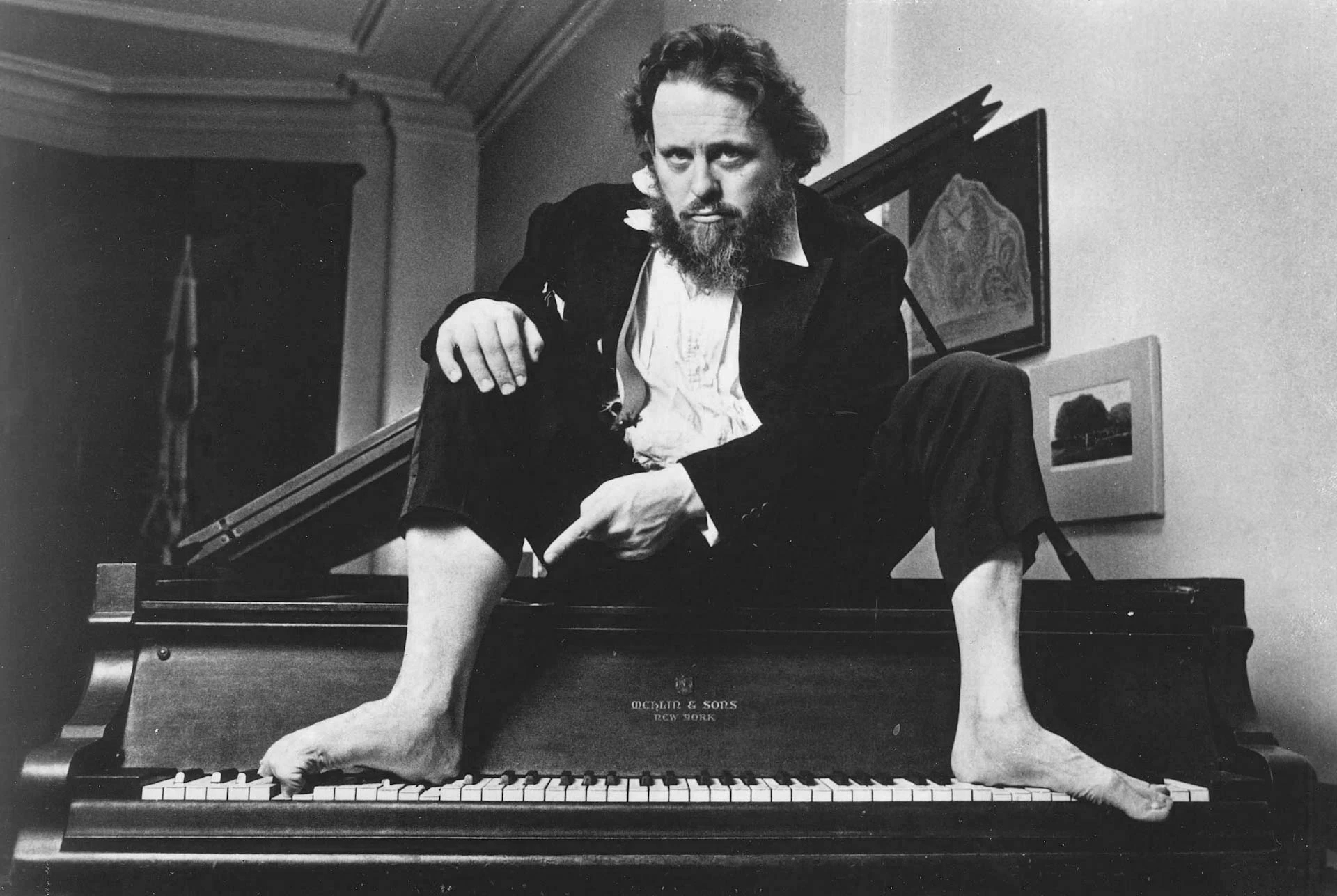
- Schickele in the 1980s
- Born: July 17, 1935; Ames, Iowa, U.S.
- Died: January 16, 2024 (aged 88); Bearsville, New York, U.S.
- Education: Swarthmore College (BA); Juilliard School (MM)
- Occupations: Composer, musical educator, parodist
- Website: schickele.com

Johann Peter Schickele (/ˈʃɪkəli/; July 17, 1935 – January 16, 2024) was an American composer, musical educator and parodist, best known for comedy albums featuring his music, which he presented as being composed by the fictional P. D. Q. Bach. He also hosted a long-running weekly radio program called Schickele Mix.

From 1990 to 1993, Schickele's P. D. Q. Bach recordings earned him four consecutive wins for the Grammy Award for Best Comedy Album.

== Early life ==
Johann Peter Schickele was born on July 17, 1935, in Ames, Iowa, to Alsatian immigrant parents. His father, Rainer Schickele (1905, Berlin – 1989, Berkeley, California), was the son of writer René Schickele and was an agricultural economist teaching at Iowa State University. In 1945, Schickele's father took a position at George Washington University in Washington, D.C., then became chairman of the Agricultural Sciences Department at North Dakota Agricultural College (now North Dakota State University) in Fargo, North Dakota in 1946.

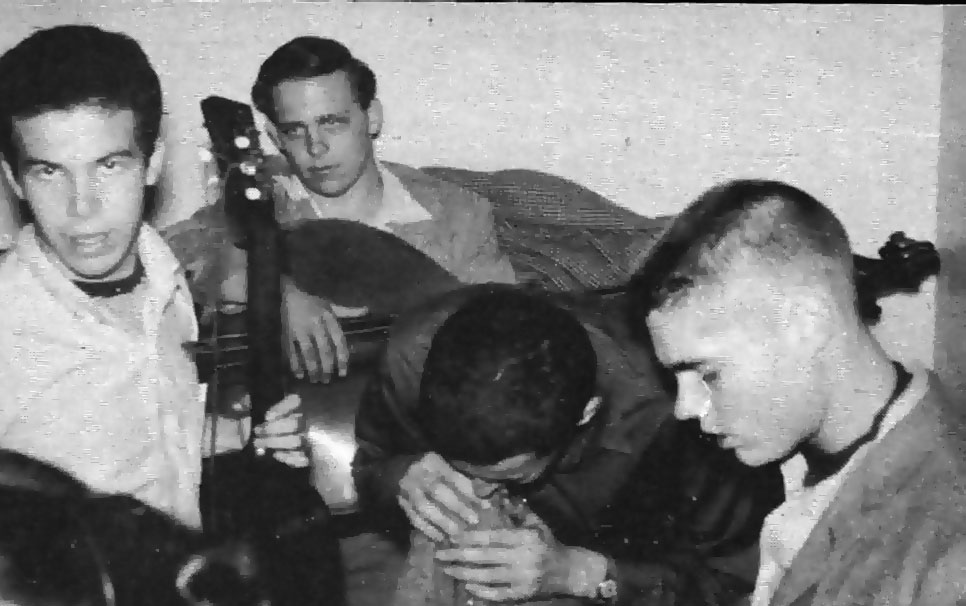
Schickele (rear) and others at Swarthmore College

In Fargo, the younger Schickele studied composition with Sigvald Thompson of the Fargo-Moorhead Symphony Orchestra. He graduated from Fargo Central High School in 1952, then attended Swarthmore College, graduating in 1957 with a degree in music. He was among the first students at Swarthmore to earn a music degree. He was a contemporary of Ted Nelson at Swarthmore, and he scored Nelson's experimental film The Epiphany of Slocum Furlow. It was his first film score. He graduated from the Juilliard School in 1960 with a master's degree in musical composition. He studied composition with Roy Harris and Vincent Persichetti.

== Early career ==
Schickele wrote music for a number of folk musicians, most notably Joan Baez, for whom he also orchestrated and arranged three albums during the mid-1960s, Noël (1966), Joan (1967), and Baptism (1968). He also composed the original score for the 1972 science fiction film Silent Running.

Schickele, an accomplished bassoonist, was also a member of the chamber rock trio the Open Window, which wrote and performed music for the 1969 revue Oh! Calcutta! and released three albums.

The humorous aspect of Schickele's musical career came from his early interest in the music of Spike Jones, whose musical ensemble lampooned popular music in the 1940s and 1950s. in 1959, while at Juilliard, Schickele teamed with conductor Jorge Mester to present a humorous concert, which became an annual event at the college. In 1965, Schickele moved the concept to The Town Hall in New York City and invited the public to attend; Vanguard Records released an album of that concert, and the character of "P. D. Q. Bach" was launched. By 1972, the concerts had become so popular that they were moved to Avery Fisher Hall at Lincoln Center.

== P.D.Q. Bach ==
Schickele developed an elaborate parody around his studies of P.D.Q. Bach, the fictional "youngest and the oddest of the twenty-odd children" of Johann Sebastian Bach. Among the fictional composer's "forgotten" repertory are such farcical works as The Abduction of Figaro, the "Unbegun" symphony, "Pervertimento for Bagpipes, Bicycle and Balloons", Canine Cantata: "Wachet Arf!", Good King Kong Looked Out, the "Trite" Quintet, "O Little Town of Hackensack", A Little Nightmare Music, the cantata Iphigenia in Brooklyn, the Concerto for Horn and Hardart, The Stoned Guest, "Hansel and Gretel and Ted and Alice", the Concerto for Two Pianos vs. Orchestra, the dramatic oratorio Oedipus Tex and Einstein on the Fritz, a parody of Schickele's Juilliard classmate Philip Glass.

His fictitious "home establishment" is the University of Southern North Dakota at Hoople, where he reports having tenure as "Very Full Professor" of "musicolology" and "musical pathology". He invented a range of rather unusual instruments. The most complicated of these is the Hardart, a tone-generating device mounted on the frame of an "automat", a coin-operated food dispenser. This modified automat is used in the Concerto for Horn and Hardart, a play on the name of Horn & Hardart who pioneered the American use of the automat in their restaurants.

Schickele also invented the "dill piccolo" for playing sour notes, the "left-handed sewer flute", the "tromboon" ("a cross between a trombone and a bassoon, having all the disadvantages of both"), the "lasso d'amore", the double-reed slide music stand, the "tuba mirum" (a flexible tube filled with wine), and the "pastaphone" (an uncooked tube of pasta played as a horn).

To a large degree, Schickele's music as P.D.Q. Bach has overshadowed his work as a "serious" composer. He frequently collaborated with soprano Michele Eaton and tenor David Dusing who often appeared with him in concerts.

Schickele performed two concerts to commemorate the 50th anniversary of his first concert at The Town Hall in New York on December 28 and 29, 2015. He reduced his concert appearances due to health issues, but continued to schedule live concert performances through 2018.

== Other musical career ==
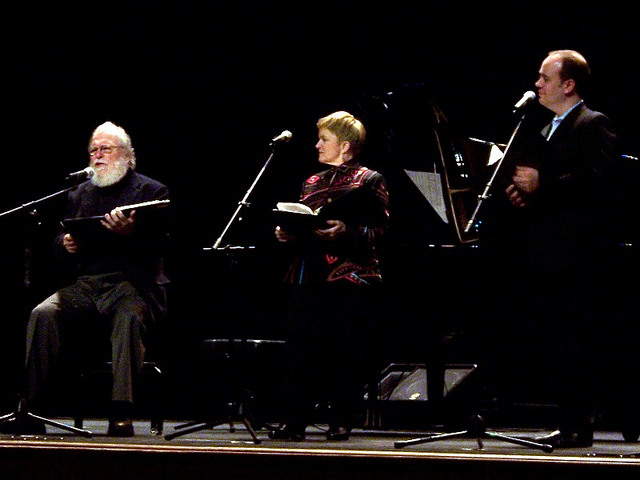
Schickele (left) with Michele Eaton and Brian Dougherty in 2010

Schickele composed more than 100 original works for symphony orchestra, choral groups, chamber ensemble, voice, television and an animated adaptation of Where the Wild Things Are (which he also narrated). He made a brief foray into cinema with the Bruce Dern film Silent Running (1972), for which he composed the musical score and co-wrote the original songs "Silent Running" and "Rejoice in the Sun" with Diane Lampert. He also wrote music for school bands, as well as for a number of musicals, including Oh! Calcutta!, and organized numerous concert performances as both musical director and performer. He was active on the international and North American concert circuit.

Schickele's musical creations won him multiple awards. His extensive body of work is marked by a distinctive style which integrates the European classical tradition with an unmistakable American idiom. He also authored P. D. Q. Bach-esque albums such as Hornsmoke, Sneaky Pete and the Wolf, and The Emperor's New Clothes. His music is published by the Theodore Presser Company.

== Radio ==
As a musical educator he also hosted the classical music educational radio program Schickele Mix, which aired on many public radio stations in the United States (and internationally on Public Radio International). The program began in 1992; lack of funding ended the production of new programs by 1999, and rebroadcasts of the existing programs finally ceased in June 2007. Only 119 of the 169 programs were in the rebroadcast rotation, because earlier shows contained American Public Radio production IDs rather than ones crediting Public Radio International. In March 2006, some of the other "lost episodes" were added back to the rotation, with one notable program remnant of the "Periodic Table of Musics", listing the names of musicians and composers as mythical element names in a format reminiscent of the periodic table.

== Personal life and death ==
Schickele married poet Susan Sindall on October 27, 1962. Their children, Matt and Karla, are musicians. The two played together in the trio Beekeeper in the 1990s. Karla is also an orchestral music composer. Peter's brother David Schickele (1937–1999) was a film director and musician.

Schickele died at his home in Bearsville, New York, on January 16, 2024, at the age of 88, due to a series of infections that damaged his health.

== Awards ==
| Year | Award | Category | Work | Result | Ref(s) |
|---|---|---|---|---|---|
| 1970 | Grammy Awards | Best Score From an Original Cast Show Album | Oh! Calcutta! | Nominated | |
| 1990 | Grammy Awards | Best Comedy Recording | P. D. Q. Bach: 1712 Overture and Other Musical Assaults | Won | |
| 1991 | Grammy Awards | Best Comedy Recording | P. D. Q. Bach: Oedipus Tex and Other Choral Calamities | Won | |
| 1992 | Grammy Awards | Best Comedy Album | P. D. Q. Bach: WTWP Classical Talkity-Talk Radio | Won | |
| 1992 | Grammy Awards | Best Album for Children | Prokofiev: Peter and the Wolf / A Zoo Called Earth / Gerald McBoing Boing | Nominated | |
| 1993 | Grammy Awards | Best Comedy Album | P. D. Q. Bach: Music for an Awful Lot of Winds and Percussion | Won | |
| 1996 | Grammy Awards | Best Spoken Comedy Album | The Definitive Biography of P.D.Q. Bach | Nominated | |
| 1999 | Grammy Awards | Best Classical Crossover Album | Schickele: Hornsmoke (Piano Concerto No. 2 In F Major "Ole"; Brass Calendar; Hornsmoke – A Horse Opera) | Won | |
| 2004 | Grammy Awards | Best Spoken Word Album for Children | The Emperor's New Clothes | Nominated | |
