= Marya Mannes =

American writer and social critic (1904–1990)

Marya Mannes (November 14, 1904 – September 13, 1990) was a 20th-century American writer and critic, known for her caustic but insightful observations of American life. Mannes also wrote under the pen name of "Sec."

== Life and career ==
Mannes lived most of her life in New York City, where she was born. Her brother was musician Leopold Mannes. Her parents, Clara (Damrosch) Mannes and David Mannes, founded the Mannes College of Music in New York. Her maternal grandfather was conductor Leopold Damrosch, and her maternal uncles were conductors Walter Damrosch and Frank Damrosch. Her father was Jewish; her mother was from a mostly Lutheran German family (and was of part-Jewish descent through her own grandfather).

In 1930 her play Cafe was staged on Broadway at the Ritz Theatre.

Mannes was an editor at Vogue and later wrote prolifically for the magazines The Reporter and The New Yorker. Mannes published a number of books of essays, sharply and wittily critical of American society, including More in Anger: Some Opinions, Uncensored and Unteleprompted. She was a much-sought-after social commentator on radio and television. She hosted her own 13-week television show on New York's WNEW-TV in 1959, I Speak for Myself.

Other books by Mannes included Subverse (1959), a satirical verse, Out of My Time (1971), an autobiography, and two novels, Message From a Stranger (1948) and They (1968).

Mannes married three times; each union ended in divorce. Her first husband was Broadway scenic designer Jo Mielziner; they wed in 1926. She married artist Richard Blow in 1937, and then married British aircraft executive Christopher Clarkson in 1948. Mannes had one child, David, with second husband Richard Blow.

She died in San Francisco, California.
