= Chin Kim =

Korean-born American violinist (b. 1957)

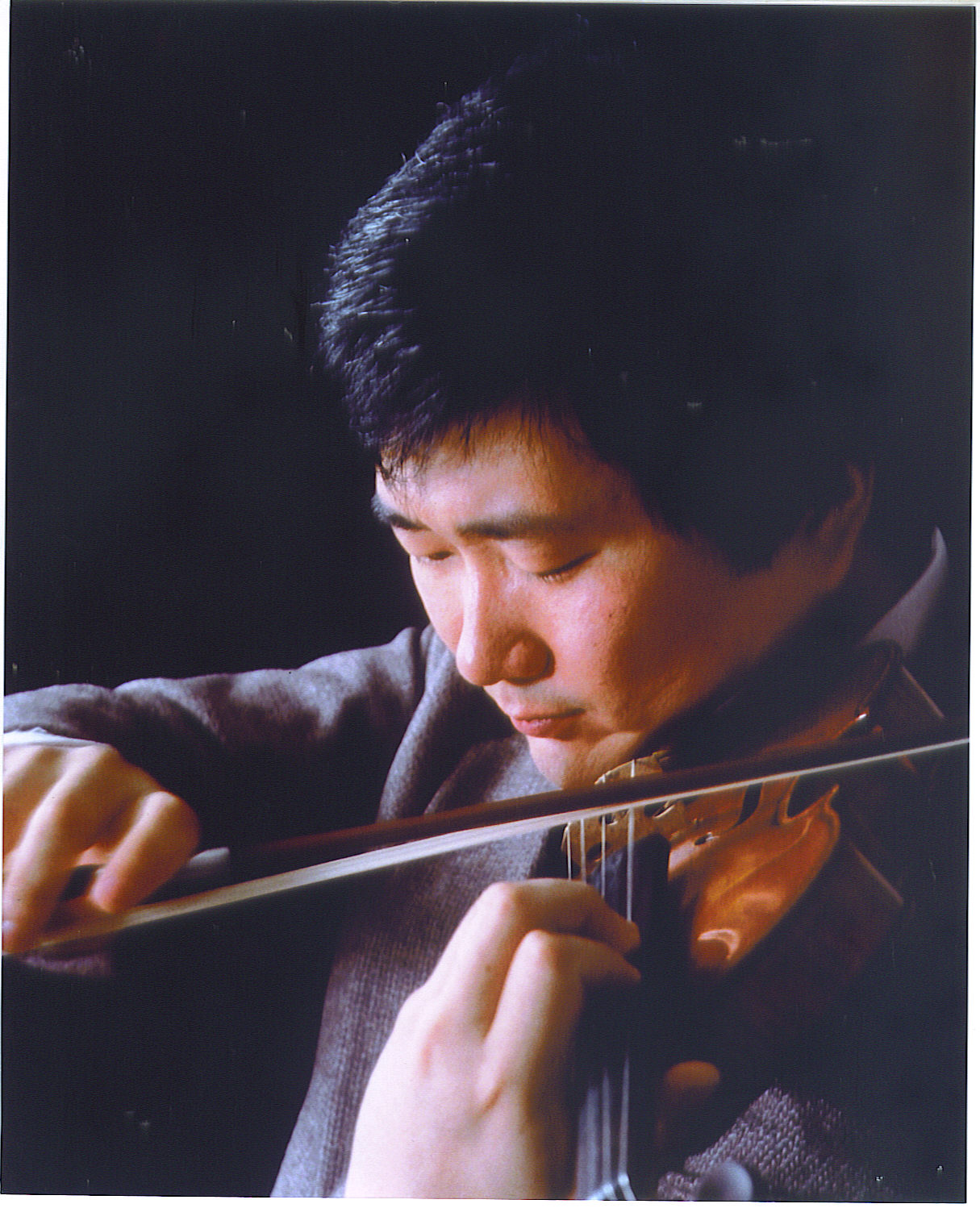
Chin Kim, violinist

Chin Kim (born 1957) is a Korean-born American classical violinist, largely educated in the United States through the Juilliard School and the Curtis Institute of Music.

== Activities ==
Chin Kim has performed extensively throughout North America, Europe, and Korea as a soloist with orchestras including the Philadelphia Orchestra, the Montreal Symphony Orchestra, Czech Philharmonic, the Atlanta Symphony Orchestra, and with both South and North Korean orchestras with conductors Leonard Slatkin, Gerhardt Albrecht, Ianzug Kakhitzhe, Myung-whun Chung, and Ling Tung. Kim also performs, gives master classes, and teaches at the Green Mountain Chamber Music Festival, the International Academy of Music Festival, and the Summit Music Festival. He is active as a soloist with orchestras, as a violinist in recitals, chamber music, master classes, and as a teacher. He teaches the violin, viola, and chamber music at the Mannes College of Music New York. He is also on the violin faculty as an associate professor at Queens College, the Aaron Copland School of Music, the CUNY doctoral program, and at Columbia University Teachers College.

== Reviews ==
His performances have been reviewed by critics with comments such as "Performing each with consummate technical ease, attractive tone, and an excellent lyrical sense. His pianist (David Oei) displays same appealing qualities"; "A gorgeous, lush tone"; "Great flair and brilliance"; "Transcendent technical control"; "Gracefully lyrical . . . Infectious warmth throughout".

== Competitions ==
Chin Kim was a prizewinner in many international violin competitions, including at the Concours Musical International Reine Elisabeth de Belgique (Brussels, Belgium) 1985, Concourse International de Montréal (Canada) 1983, Premio Paganini International Violin Competition (Genoa, Italy) 1990, and International Violin Competition of Indianapolis (USA) 1986.

== Recordings ==
Chin Kim's CDs of the Tchaikovsky, Glazunov, Prokofiev 2nd Concertos, and the Prokofiev Sonata No. 2 (conductor Paul Freeman, with orchestras St. Petersburg Philharmonic, Moscow Philharmonic, and with pianist David Oei) were released by ProArte/Intersound to high critical acclaim: "Performing each with consummate technical ease, attractive tone, and an excellent lyrical sense"; "Fully in command of his instrument and musically assertive. The Sonata is a superior example of perceptive chamber music collaboration"; "Kim's rich, golden tone is a real treat. . . no doubt many great singers would envy Kim's lovingly phrased and songful performance . . . easy recommendation". The Starr-Kim-Boeckheler Piano Trio (with pianist Susan Starr and cellist Ulrich Boeckheler) released the Mendelssohn Piano Trio in C minor, and the Tchaikovsky Piano Trio in a minor with Mastersound/Allegro.

== Education and awards ==
A graduate of the Curtis Institute of Music in 1979, and subsequently from the Juilliard School in 1989, Kim was awarded the D.M.A. degree, the Petscheck award, the Kreisler award, and the Concerto Soloist award. He was awarded the Nan-Pa award from Korea, which is the highest honor given to a Korean-born musician. His teachers included Ivan Galamian, Dorothy DeLay, Josef Gingold, Jascha Brodsky, Felix Galimir, Sally Thomas, and Kyung Wha Chung, among others. He also studied Schenkerian analysis with Carl Schachter and Bach with Edward Aldwell.

== Management ==
Chin Kim is exclusively managed by Gershunoff Artists, LLC.
