= Leopold Mannes =

American inventor (1899–1964)

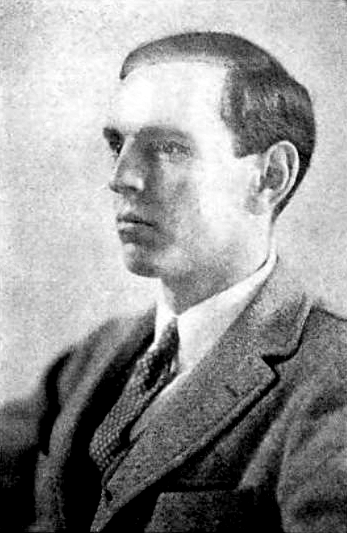
- Born: Leopold Damrosch Mannes; December 26, 1899; New York City, US
- Died: August 11, 1964 (aged 64); Oak Bluffs, Massachusetts, US
- Education: Harvard University
- Occupations: Musician; inventor
- Parents: David Mannes (father); Clara Mannes (mother)

Leopold Damrosch Mannes (December 26, 1899 – August 11, 1964) was an American musician, who, together with Leopold Godowsky Jr., created the first practical color transparency film, Kodachrome.

== Life and career ==
Mannes was born in New York City. He was a son of David Mannes and Clara (Damrosch) Mannes, and a brother of writer Marya Mannes. His parents founded the Mannes College of Music in New York. His maternal grandfather was conductor Leopold Damrosch, and his maternal uncles were conductors Walter Damrosch and Frank Damrosch. His father was Jewish; his mother was from a mostly Lutheran German family (and was of part Jewish descent through her own grandfather).

Mannes and Godowsky's experimentation with color photography began in 1917, after seeing the film Our Navy in Prizma Color, which was advertised as a color film. Because of the low quality the boys felt cheated and decided to do something about it. They designed a movie camera and projector, each with three lenses covered by orange-red, green and blue-violet filters. They took multiple black-and-white exposures and projected them back through the filters. They patented this system, but it was not a commercially viable process.

Mannes went on to study piano at Harvard and earned a Pulitzer Music Scholarship and a Guggenheim fellowship (1926) to study music composition in Italy. He later continued to play professional piano while studying physics at Harvard. Godowsky studied violin at UCLA and became a violinist with the San Francisco Symphony Orchestra. Although a continent apart, they continued to collaborate on ideas for improving color photography. By 1922, Godowsky had given up his orchestra jobs in California and moved back to New York City where he and Mannes worked as musicians. They experimented with color photography during their spare time.

While on his way to perform in Europe in late 1922, Mannes made the chance acquaintance of a senior partner in the investment firm of Kuhn, Loeb and Co. and described their progress with color photography. Some months later the firm sent one of their junior associates, Lewis L. Strauss to the Mannes apartment to view the color process. The final results were impressive enough for Kuhn Loeb to invest in the process.

With financial backing, Mannes and Godowsky built a dedicated laboratory and in 1924 took out additional patents on their work. In 1930 Eastman Kodak was so impressed with their results that they contracted them to move to Rochester and take advantage of Kodak's research facilities.

By 1935, Mannes and Godowsky and the Kodak research staff had developed a marketable subtractive color film for home movies. Kodachrome film was coated with three layers of ordinary black-and-white silver halide gelatin emulsion, but each layer was made sensitive to only one-third of the spectrum of colors—in essence, to red, green or blue. Special processing chemistry and procedures caused complementary-colored cyan, magenta or yellow dye images to be generated in these layers as the black-and-white silver images were developed. After they had served their purpose, the silver images were chemically removed, so that the completed chromogenic film consisted solely of the three layers of dye images suspended in gelatin. The statement that each layer is sensitive to only one-third of the spectrum is inaccurate. All three layers were inherently sensitive to the entire spectrum The bottom layer was sensitive to red and blue light. The layer above it was sensitive to green and blue light. The top layer was sensitive to blue light only. Blue light was prevented from reaching the lower two layers by coating, on top of the blue-and green-sensitive layer, a yellow-colored "Carey-Lea Silver" filter layer. The silver in it was removed by the bleach and fix steps that followed the three color-development steps of the process.

Kodachrome 16mm movie film was released for sale in 1935, and in 1936 Kodachrome 35mm still (KS perforations) and 8mm movie film were released. Later, after the development of Kodachrome Commercial (an intentionally low-contrast film intended for later duplication), this film was made available on an exclusive basis to Technicolor, with BH perforations, and which immediately renamed it "Technicolor Monopack" (note, especially, the capital letter in "Monopack", which asserted that this was a proprietary process, although this name was never actually registered in the USPTO), and this single-strip three-color camera film remained available exclusively through Technicolor (with processing exclusively through Kodak's own labs) until the Eastman Color negative-positive process completely replaced Three-strip Technicolor after 1954.

Mannes returned to music after inventing the Kodachrome film and process, performing as a pianist and composing several musical scores. He served as president of the Mannes College of Music (founded by his parents in New York) and served as a judge in music competitions, including the first Van Cliburn International Piano Competition. Leopold Damrosch Mannes was the son of Leo Mannes and Clara (Damrosch) Mannes. Clara was a sister of Walter and Frank Damrosch, the famous New York City musicians.

Leopold Godowsky Jr. married George Gershwin's younger sister, the singer Frances Gershwin, who went on to become a painter and sculptor. He continued the musical tradition of his father, Leopold Godowsky (one of the great pianists of the early twentieth century), playing violin with the Los Angeles and San Francisco Symphony Orchestras, as well as performing jointly with his father.

Leopold Mannes died from a cerebral hemorrhage at Martha's Vineyard Hospital on August 11, 1964, and was buried at Chilmark Cemetery.

Mannes and Godowsky were inducted into the National Inventors Hall of Fame in 2005.

== Sources ==
- Howard, John Tasker (1939). Our American Music: Three Hundred Years of It. New York: Thomas Y. Crowell Company.

== Other patents ==
- U.S. patent 1,997,493 Color Photography filed January 1922, issued April 1935
- U.S. patent 2,304,940 Color Photography filed January 1940, issued December 1942
