= David Mannes =

American violinist (1866–1959)

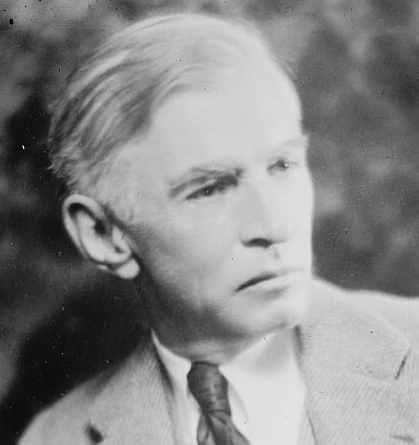

Background information
- Born: 16 February 1866; New York City, US
- Died: 25 April 1959 (aged 93) New York City, US
- Occupations: Conductor; educator
- Instrument: Violin

David Mannes (16 February 1866 – 25 April 1959) was an American violinist, conductor, educator, and community organizer.

== Biography ==
David Mannes was born in New York City in 1866. He studied the violin in Harlem with composer and violinist John Thomas Douglass, the son of a freed slave, and later in Berlin with Karel Halíř. Mannes was a violinist in the New York Symphony Orchestra from 1891 and its concertmaster from 1898 to 1912. In 1912 he helped found the Colored Music Settlement School and in 1916, with his wife Clara Mannes (the daughter of Leopold Damrosch and sister of Walter Damrosch), the Mannes Music School, both in New York City.

David Mannes was both a musician and an activist. He believed music to be a universal language, and that it could be used to bridge divides between races and social classes in America.

From 1917 to 1941, Mannes conducted free public concerts at the Metropolitan Museum of Art's Great Hall. The series consisted of eight concerts per year, and was funded primarily by John D. Rockefeller. Records indicate that there were 781 in attendance for the very first concert and that by the sixth concert of 1919, attendance was over 7,000. Mannes recruited musicians for the series from the New York Symphony Orchestra, and later the New York Philharmonic when the New York Symphony merged with the Philharmonic Society of New York.

In 1933, he conducted the Naumburg Orchestral Concerts, in the Naumburg Bandshell, Central Park, in the summer series.

Music Is My Faith is his autobiography. Mannes is also discussed in Maurice Peress' "Dvorak to Duke Ellington: A Conductor Explores America's Music and Its African American Roots."

He died in 1959, aged 93, and was buried in Woodlawn Cemetery in the Bronx, in the Damrosch Family Plot.

== Legacy ==
His children were musician Leopold Mannes and writer Marya Mannes. His friends were many, including John D. Rockefeller, John Pierpont Morgan, Ernest Bloch, and James Reese Europe. Mannes was painted by friend and artist Thomas Hart Benton in Portrait of David Mannes and Evening Concert.
