= David Loeb (composer) =

American classical composer

David Loeb (born May 11, 1939) is an American composer of contemporary classical music. Born in New York City, he has written extensively for early music instruments such as the viol, as well as instruments from China and Japan. He teaches at the Mannes College The New School for Music, and has additionally served as a member of the composition faculty at the Curtis Institute of Music.

His notable students include Jennifer Higdon, Jeremy Beck, and Craig Walsh.

== Works ==
- Ancient Legends
- Andorran Fantasy
- Balinese Fantasies (Published by ALRY Publications)
- Between Sea and Sky
- Cantata for Oboe and String Orchestra
- Caprices for Solo Mandolin Vol. 1-2
- Chanson Malagache
- A Distant Land Unfurled
- Fantasia on a Theme of Yuize
- Fantasia on Pyong-si-jo No. 1-2
- Fantasia sobre "Una Hiji Tiene del Rey"
- Fantasias for the Japanese Consort
- Ganya
- Imagined Landscapes
- Keisho for Theorbo Solo
- The Meeting of Sea and Clouds
- Nocturne for Mandolin and Guitar
- Prelude for Two Consorts
- Quartet for flute, guitar, violin, and cello
- Riddles
- Rivermist in Summer
- Sonata No. 1-6 for Cello Solo
- Sonata for Trombone and Piano No. 1 (1998)
- Sonata for Trombone and Piano No. 2 (2000)
- Sonata for Trombone and Piano No. 3 (2003)
- Sonata for Trombone and Piano No. 4 (2004)
- Sonata for Trombone and Piano No. 5 (2005)
- Seiya
- Symphony for Mandolin orchestra
- Three Fantasias on East Asian Modes
- Tre Romanze
- Trois Cansos
- Two Views of the Silent Waterfall
- Utagumi
- Yoru Ga Mau

== Books ==
- Loeb, David. Chinese & Japanese Musical Instruments and Their Notation. Harold Branch, 1972.

== Sources ==
- Loeb, David: The life and times of a viola composer, Journal of the Viola da Gamba Society of America. 22 (1985), p. 29-34.
- Anderson, Ruth. Contemporary American composers. A biographical dictionary, 1st edition, G. K. Hall, 1976.
- Press, Jaques Cattell (Ed.). Who's who in American Music. Classical, first edition. R. R. Bowker, 1983.
