= Rosalind Appleby =

Australian music journalist and author

Rosalind Appleby (born 30 September 1979) is an Australian music journalist and author.

== Early life ==
Rosalind Appleby studied music at the University of Western Australia and graduated with a Bachelor of Music Performance (clarinet) in 2002. She is a music critic for The West Australian newspaper where her reviews and articles cover classical, jazz and world music.

== Career ==
Her book, Women of Note: the Rise of Australian Women Composers (published by Fremantle Press in 2012), revealed that 25% of Australian composers are women, more than almost any other country in the world. Women of Note documents the untold and often overlooked stories and music of twenty Australian women composers, spanning the twentieth century to present day.

Appleby has contributed to a variety of national and international publications including the Financial Times, The Australian, Scoop magazine, and The Opera Critic. She is the Western Australian correspondent for the London based Opera magazine. Her work has also been published in the Music Forum Journal, Resonate and Limelight magazines.

Between 2018 – 2023 Appleby was a founding board member managing editor of Seesaw, a Western Australian arts magazine.
