= The Wurst of P. D. Q. Bach =

The Wurst of P.D.Q. Bach

Compilation album by P.D.Q. Bach
- Released: 1971
- Label: Vanguard Records

P.D.Q. Bach chronology
The Stoned Guest (1970)	The Wurst of P.D.Q. Bach (1971)	The Intimate; P.D.Q. Bach (1974)

The Wurst of P.D.Q. Bach is a collection of works by Peter Schickele under his comic pseudonym of P.D.Q. Bach originally recorded on the Vanguard Records label by the composer. It includes "lowlights" from four different Vanguard albums: Peter Schickele Presents an Evening with P.D.Q. Bach (1807–1742)?, An Hysteric Return: P.D.Q. Bach at Carnegie Hall, Report from Hoople: P.D.Q. Bach on the Air, and P.D.Q. Bach's half-act opera The Stoned Guest. Wurst is the German word for sausage, with the album cover photograph set in a sausage shop.

== Performers ==
- Professor Peter Schickele, hardart, wine bottle, conductor
- Chamber Orchestra under the direction of Jorge Mester
- The Royal P.D.Q. Bach Festival Orchestra, Jorge Mester, conductor
- The Orchestra of the University of Southern North Dakota at Hoople Heavy Opera Company under the direction of John Nelson
- Marlene Kleinman, mezzanine-soprano
- Lorna Haywood, off-coloratura
- John Ferrante, bargain counter tenor
- William Woolf, bass
- Bernice, houndentenor (Dog)
- Will Jordan as Milton Host
- Bill Macy as Paul Henry Lung
- The Okay Chorale, John Nelson, director
- I Virtuosi di Hoople
- Amateur Musica Antiqua of Hoople
- Robert Dennis, announcer and callioper
- Ralph Froelich, French horn
- Leonid Hambro, harpsichord
- Seymour Platt, trumpet mouthpiece

== Track listing ==
=== Disc one ===
- Concerto for Horn and Hardart, S. 27
  - Allegro con brillo
  - Tema con variazione
  - Menuetto con Panna e Zucchero
- Cantata: Iphigenia in Brooklyn, S. 53162
  - Aria: "As Hyperion across the flaming sky"
  - Recitative: "And lo, she found herself within a market"
  - Ground: "Dying, and yet in death alive"
  - Recitative: "And in a vision, Iphigenia saw her brother, Orestes"
  - Aria: "Running knows"
- New Horizons in Music Appreciation: Beethoven's Fifth Symphony
- Schleptet in E-flat major
  - Molto Larghissimo – Allegro Boffo
  - Menuetto con Brio ma senza Trio
  - Adagio Saccharino
  - Yehudi Menuetto
  - Presto Hey Nonny Nonnio
- What's My Melodic Line?
- Madrigal "My bonnie lass she smelleth" from The Triumphs of Thusnelda

=== Disc two ===
- "Unbegun" Symphony (Schickele)
  - IV. Andante – Allegro
- Half-act opera: The Stoned Guest, excerpts
  - Introduction
  - Overture
  - Recitative and aria: "Now is the season"
  - Trio: "I'm sure I'd be"
  - Intermission feature: Opera Whiz
  - Plot synopsis
  - Finale: "O saviour"
- Fugue in C minor, from the "Toot" Suite for calliope four hands, S. 212°
- Oratorio: The Seasonings, S. 1½ tsp.
  - Chorus: "Tarragon of virtue is full"
  - Recitative: "And there were in the same country"
  - Duet: "Bide thy thyme"
  - Recitative: "Then asked he"
  - Chorale: "By the leeks of Babylon, There we sat down, yea, we wept"
  - Aria: "Open sesame seeds"
  - Recitative: "So saying"
  - Duet: "Summer is a cumin seed"
  - Chorus with soloists: "To curry favor, favor curry"

== Sources ==
- The Wurst of P.D.Q. Bach (two disc set), schickele.com
