= Jeremy Beck =

American composer (born 1960)

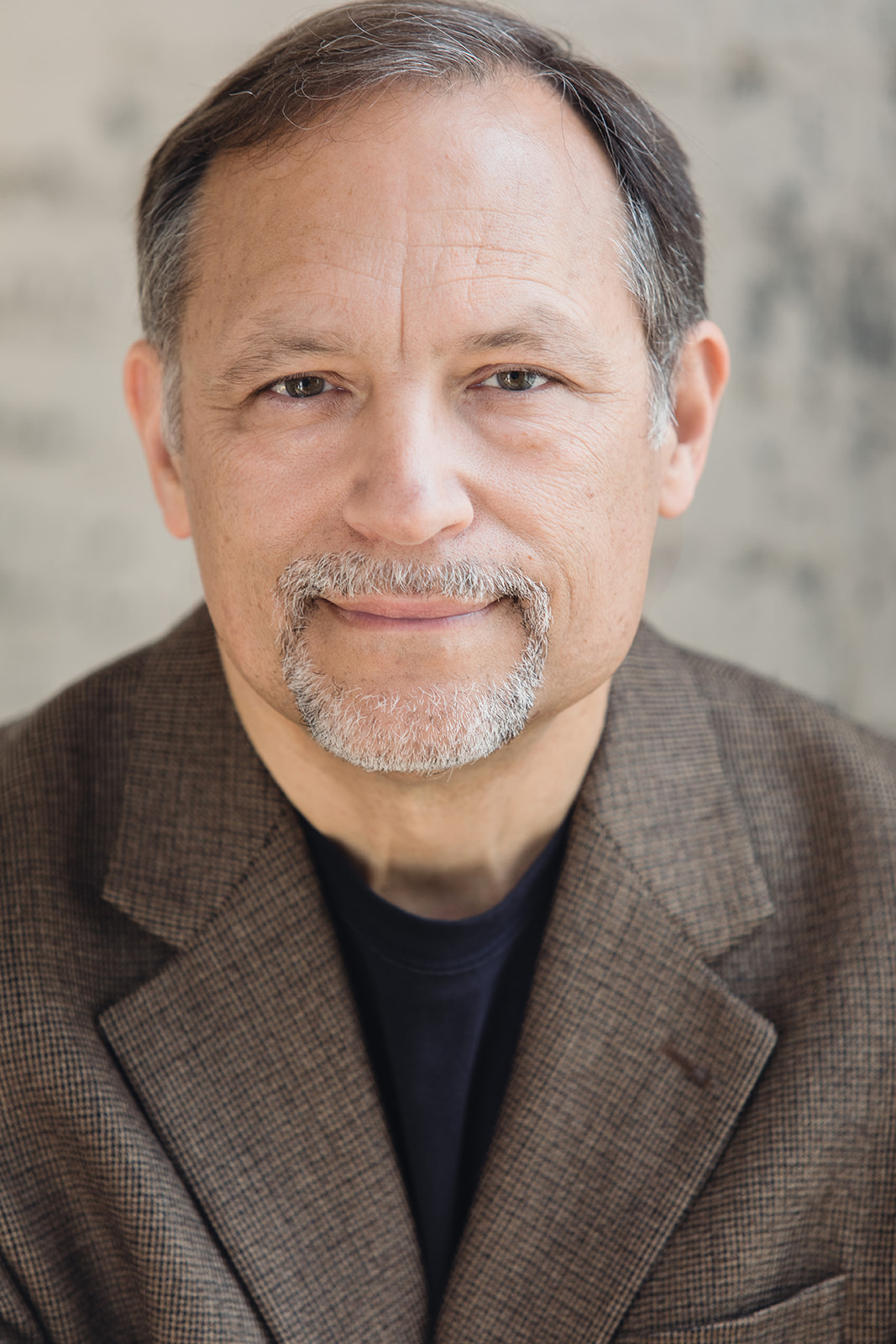
- Beck in 2018
- Born: Painesville, Ohio
- Education: Mannes College of Music (BS 1984); Duke University (MA 1989); Yale School of Music (DMA 1995)
- Occupation: Composer
- Website: beckmusic.org

Jeremy Beck (born 1960) is an American composer of contemporary classical music The critic Mark Sebastian Jordan has said that "Beck was committed to tonality and a recognizable musical vernacular long before that became the hip bandwagon it is today. Indeed, [he is] ... an original voice celebrating music."

== Early life ==
Jeremy Joseph Beck was born 15 January 1960, in Painesville, Ohio. His father, Albert William Beck (b. 4 April 1931 in Scranton, Pennsylvania; d. 16 May 2018 Quincy, Illinois), known as "Al", was a visual artist and poet who taught for many years at Culver–Stockton College in Canton, Missouri. His mother, Mila Katrine Aho (b. 24 June 1935 in Painesville, Ohio; d. 16 March 2018 in Memphis, Tennessee), known as "Katrine", was a pianist and organist who taught music privately. Beck's parents married in 1958, but not without some controversy: the Beck family was Jewish and the Aho family was Lutheran. Albert's parents agreed to support the wedding as long as the Ahos knew they were Jewish. Katrine's parents agreed to support the wedding only if Katrine's father – Gustav Axel Aho, also known as "G.A. Aho", a Lutheran minister – performed the ceremony in his own church. Under those conditions, the nuptials took place. The family lived briefly in and around Cleveland, Ohio, before moving to Kansas City for a year, 1967–68, where Al served as dean of students at the Kansas City Art Institute. The family then settled in Quincy, Illinois. Beck's parents were divorced in 1977.

Beck's earliest musical studies were with his mother; he then began playing the cello in the 4th grade in Quincy. While in high school, Beck studied music composition and theory privately with Thom Ritter George, an Eastman graduate and conductor of the Quincy Symphony Orchestra. Following his graduation from high school in 1978, Beck moved to New York City, earning a B.S. in Composition from the Mannes College of Music where he studied with David Loeb. He later earned a master's degree in composition from Duke University where he studied with Stephen Jaffe and Thomas Oboe Lee. Following his studies at Duke, Beck completed a second master's degree and a doctoral degree in composition at the Yale School of Music, studying with Jacob Druckman, Martin Bresnick, Lukas Foss, and Allen Forte.

== Working life ==
After graduating from Yale, Beck taught music composition and theory at the University of Northern Iowa, earning tenured there in 1998. Beck took a leave of absence from UNI to teach for a year at Chatham College in Pittsburgh, Pennsylvania. However, instead of returning to Iowa, in 1999, Beck accepted a position as an associate professor of music composition and theory at California State University, Fullerton, where he also earned tenure, in 2002. During his teaching years, Beck was invited to teach and lecture on American music, music theory, and composition around the world, including in St. Petersburg, Russia, and Ghana.

In 2002, Beck accepted a short-term teaching position at the University of Louisville. Following a change in the administration and the loss of his position, Beck decided to pursue a J.D. degree, graduating from the university's Brandeis School of Law in 2007. In addition to his continuing work in composition, Beck is also a practicing attorney in Louisville, Kentucky. He blends his music background into his entertainment law practice, with an emphasis on copyright, trademark, and contracts.

== Recordings ==
=== Chamber Music ===
Released on the Ulysses Arts label in 2026, this album features world première recordings of Beck's chamber music. These compositions, feature various combinations for strings, winds, voice, and piano. Music critic review descriptions note that the music balances elements of tonal lyricism, rhythmic vitality, excitement, and reflection, where "the present and the past are interwoven like a common thread."

=== Song of the Sky ===
This 2025 neuma recording features Beck's Cello Concerto, his Rhapsody for violin and orchestra, excerpts from The Highway, an opera noir, and the title composition for harp and orchestra. About his Cello Concerto, one critic wrote it "is a superbly realized vehicle for both soloist and orchestra. The cellist is showcased, but the orchestra is also vital to the work's character. The work is the very embodiment of clarity in its harmonious design and methodically developed structure, and the contrasts from one movement to the next lend it a genuine concerto-like identity. ...[C]overing broad stylistic ground, the work would be a fine addition to any cello soloist's repertoire." Moreover, this is an album that "stands as compelling evidence of exactly what critics have long said about Beck, that he remains ... an original and vital voice working confidently within a tradition rather than against one."

=== Requiem ===
Beck's Requiem was recorded by Coro Volante and the Cincinnati String Ensemble, directed by Brett Scott, and released by Acis Productions in 2024. One critic described this major work as "...harmonically alluring...[with] intriguing contrapuntal techniques...and touching simplicity." Donald Rosenberg in Gramophone called it "A piece of tranquil and urgent beauty...An exquisite first recording...Beck often goes against the grain, finding fresh means to convey the weighty or hopeful messages, and turning to lyricism rather than overt drama...Beck achieves an intimate portrait of mourning at once comforting and fervent."

=== remember ===
Released on the neuma label in 2023, Beck's seventh recording includes eight diverse compositions for a variety of instrumental and vocal forces. Called "captivating from beginning to end," three of the compositions, Invitation to Love, Elegy for piano and string orchestra, and November Dances for flute, viola, and harp, were composed during the COVID-19 pandemic lockdown. Invitation to Love won First Prize in Category 3 (treble choir) of The King's Singers New Music Prize in 2021. The text is by Paul Laurence Dunbar (1872–1906) who was an American poet, novelist, and short story writer. Born in Ohio to freed slaves from Kentucky, he became one of the first influential Black poets in American literature.

=== by moonlight ===
Beck has released six recordings of his music on the innova label. About Beck's most recent release, the music critic Jonathan Woolf declared that Beck "...fashion[s] convincing music from traditional ways and means that sounds alive and relevant. ... [by moonlight] also shows his positive and tonal approach to composition, one that is happily devoid of arid technical or doctrinaire investigations." Another review declared that Beck's compositions are "Luminous, expressive, and refined [and that these] are some of the words that come to mind as the album's tonal pieces play, "by moonlight" deftly showing Beck cultivating an individual voice while operating within a tradition."

=== String Quartets ===
The critic Donald Rosenberg describes the music on Beck's recording, String Quartets (2013), as "forceful and expressive … concise in structure and generous in tonal language, savouring both the dramatic and the poetic," while Joshua Kosman of the San Francisco Chronicle states Beck's music is "appealing and skillfully crafted … [with] lush tonal harmonies." Kosman further observes that "novelty isn't the only thing music can provide, and the moody expressiveness of Beck's writing is its own reward."

=== IonSound Project ===
Beck's 2011 recording, IonSound Project, features the ensemble-in-residence at the University of Pittsburgh. His music on this recording has been described as "uplifting, buoyant and ... emotional and sensitive to both the performer and the listener." In addition, critic Andrew Sigler finds Beck's music "rhythmically intricate, and makes nods to the past while sitting squarely in the present. … Though architecturally rigorous, Beck writes clearly and without pretense[.]"

=== Never Final, Never Gone ===
Beck's third innova recording, Never Final, Never Gone (2008), features a variety of chamber and vocal music.

=== pause and feel and hark ===
His second recording, pause and feel and hark, released in May 2006, includes Black Water, a monodrama based on the novel by Joyce Carol Oates. Black Water received its Australian concert premiere at the 2012 Adelaide Fringe Festival. The stage premiere of this monodrama was produced by the Center for Contemporary Opera at Symphony Space on April 29, 2016, in New York City.

=== Wave ===
In 2004, Wave – a Slovak Radio Symphony Orchestra recording devoted to Beck's music – was released on the Innova label. This recording includes his four-movement Sinfonietta for string orchestra, "a harmonically inventive, thoroughly engaging work." The disc also includes his operatic soliloquy, Death of a Little Girl With Doves, for soprano and orchestra. This "deeply attractive" composition is based on the life and letters of the sculptor Camille Claudel. The recording of this major work was heralded for its "imperious melodic confidence, fluent emotional command and yielding tenderness."

== Opera ==
Beck's short comic opera, Review, with a libretto by Patricia Marx, was one of three finalists in the 2010 National Opera Association's New Chamber Opera Competition. It was performed by Oberlin Opera Theater in February, 2014, and twice by Peabody Opera: in October, 2011 in Baltimore, and in Richmond, Virginia, at the College Music Society's annual convention. Review was previously included in the 2009 Opera America and Houston Grand Opera New Works Sampler. Following that successful showcase, Review was then produced by the Moores Opera Center at the University of Houston and later was given its New York premiere by the Center for Contemporary Opera.

Beck's opera The Biddle Boys and Mrs. Soffel was named by the Pittsburgh Post-Gazette as one of the Top Ten Cultural Events in Pittsburgh for the year 2001.

With a libretto by the composer based on a novel by Joyce Carol Oates, his monodrama Black Water received its stage premiere on April 29, 2016. Produced by the Center for Contemporary Opera, the sold-out production at Symphony Space's Thalia Theater in New York City featured Laura Bohn, soprano, and Isabella Dawis, piano, with music direction by Lidiya Yankovskaya and stage direction by Eugenia Arsenis. This composition has since received multiple staged performances, most notably by City Lyric Opera in New York and by Forest Collective in Melbourne.

== Awards ==
Beck has earned awards, grants and honors from Aaron Copland House, American Composers Orchestra, California Arts Council, the Los Angeles Chapter of the American Composers Forum, Kentucky Arts Council, Millay Colony for the Arts, Wellesley Composers Conference, Oregon Bach Festival, and the Iowa Arts Council. In 2021, he was one of four first-place prize winners in The King's Singers New Music Prize competition.
