= Craig Walsh =

Musical artist (born 1971)

- Born: Craig Thomas Walsh; April 11, 1971 (age 55); Somerville, New Jersey, USA
- Genres: Classical Music; Electronic Art Music; Experimental Music
- Occupations: Professor Emeritus; Composer; Pianist
- Instruments: Piano; Composition
- Years active: 1986–present

"Zook for chamber ensemble" excerpt
From the album Bugaboo (Albany Records 2008).

Craig Thomas Walsh (born April 11, 1971, in Somerville, New Jersey) is an American composer of acoustic and electronic music.

He studied at the Mannes School of Music (B.Mus.) and Brandeis University (M.F.A./ Ph.D.).

Craig Walsh's awards for his original compositions include grants from the John Simon Guggenheim Memorial Foundation, Meet the Composer, Concorso Internazionale Luigi Russolo, Lee Ettelson Award for Chamber Music, Siday Musical Creativity Award from the International Computer Music Association (ICMA), Music Teachers National Association (MTNA), and the American Society of Composers, Authors, and Publishers (ASCAP), among others. He previously taught at the University of North Carolina at Greensboro, Bridgewater State University, and the University of Arizona.

Walsh's music can be heard on Albany Records, Centaur Records and the Society for Electro-Acoustic Music in the United States CD series.

His work has been described as “bright and snappy music rooted in modernism, but also referencing the carefree attitude of American pop culture...having brightly contrasting, sharply spliced sections, funkily angular rhythmic loops, motives that are disjunct and dissonant, but function a bit like pop hooks, and harmonies that aren’t tonal, but also tend to accept the idea that a '[tonal] center' isn’t a bad thing” (Fanfare Magazine, March/April 2009). In 2008 Albany Records released Walsh's first solo CD, Bugaboo, with the New York New Music Ensemble.

== Selected works ==
- The Destruction of the Temple of Heaven for piano and 9 instruments (2012)
- String Quartet (2010)
- Sugar Touch for alto saxophone and electro-acoustic music (2009)
- Cookin' the Books for flute, clarinet, violin, viola, cello, piano, and percussion (2008)
- Neshanic Wanes for piano trio (2007)
- Pointing Out Your Ruse for violin and percussion (2005)
- Terma for soprano and digital media (2004)
- Chaconnesque for clarinet, viola, and piano (2003)
- Bugaboo for chamber orchestra (2002)
- Schism for clarinet and viola (2000)
- Lines for piano solo (2000)
- Radix for digital media (1999)
- Junket for digital media (1999)
- Pipeline Burst Cache for amplified cello and digital media (1998)
- Fallout City for digital media (1997)
- Zook for trumpet, clarinet, violin, cello and piano (1997)
- Shifting Trajectories for digital media (1996)
- Citrine for flute, clarinet, violin, cello, and harpsichord (1995)
- Zoom for violin and piano (1995)
- 0 to 33 in 1098.5 for violin, clarinet (1994)
- Black Scissors for prepared piano (1993)

== Recordings ==
- Sugar Touch for alto saxophone and electro-acoustic music on the album "Dragon: Swarimius Presents". Todd Rewoldt, saxophone. Voce House Records (2012)
- Pointing out your Ruse for violin and percussion on the album "Playing the Edge". Mark Rush, violin. Albany Records (TROY 1199) (2010)
- Bugaboo, The Chamber Music of Craig Walsh featuring The New York New Music Ensemble, Albany Records (TROY 1047) (2008)
- Terma for soprano and electro-acoustic music, Society of Electro-Acoustic Music In the US CD series vol. 14 (2004)
- Schism for clarinet and viola, Centaur Records (2002)
- Pipeline Burst Cache for cello and electro-acoustic music, Society of Electro-Acoustic Music In the US CD series vol. 9 (1999)
- Pipeline Burst Cache for cello and electro-acoustic music, Fondazione Russolo-Pratella, XXI Concorso Internazionale Luigi Russolo Di Musica Elettroacustica (1999)

== Degrees ==
- Mannes School of Music, B.Mus. (1993)
- Brandeis University, M.F.A. (1997)
- Brandeis University, Ph.D. (1999)

Major teachers include Laurie Altman, Martin Boykan, Eric Chasalow, Robert Cuckson, David Loeb, and Yehudi Wyner.
