= Antonio Fernandez Ros =

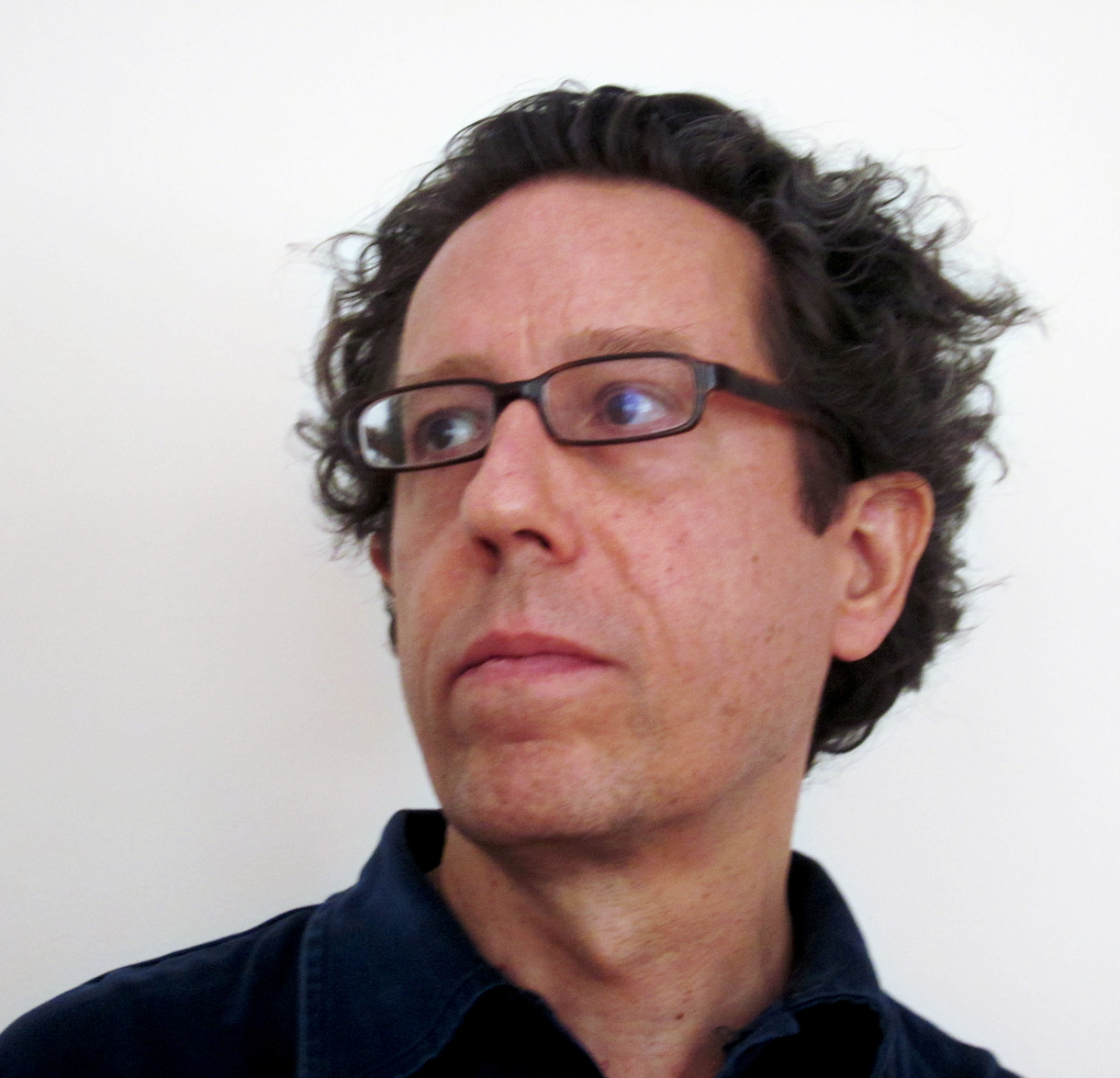
Antonio Fernández Ros

Antonio Fernandez Ros (born 1961, Mexico City) is a Mexican composer of instrumental and electronic music as well of sound installations.

== Biography ==
He obtained his bachelor's degree in composition from the Mannes College of Music in New York City and did post-graduate studies at the Graduate Center of the City University of New York. Through a scholarship from the French government pursued studies in computer music in Paris, where he worked at the Centre Pompidou's IRCAM, at the Groupe de Recherche Musical and with Iannis Xenakis at The Sorbonne.

He has received three times grants from the National Council for the Arts and Culture of Mexico (FONCA). In 1995 the Rockefeller Foundation awarded him an artist grant. From 1995 to 1996 he was invited on full scholarship to FABRICA, the Benetton Arts Center in Italy. In 1999 he was awarded by the Mexican Academy of Film with an Ariel Award for the music of the film Bajo California: El Límite del Tiempo

The music of Antonio Fernández Ros has been played at New York's Merkin Hall, the Brooklyn Academy of Music, Festival Internacional Cervantino, Northwestern U. Contemporary Music Series, Buffalo's North American New Music Festival, the Electronic Music Society Festival in Stockholm, Center for Contemporary Art Luigi Pecci in Prato, Italy and by ensembles such as the Mexico City Philharmonic and the Brooklyn Philharmonic under the direction of Lukas Foss.

== Recent work ==
In 2009 he realized the 24 channel sound installation La Regadera for the National Sound Archives of Mexico (Fonoteca Nacional).

In 2010 he wrote the music for the performance of Autoconstrucción, a stage event at the Kurimanzutto Gallery in Mexico City with artist Abraham Cruzvillegas and director Antonio Castro. Also in 2010 he realized the sound installation 1910 for the exhibit Cine y Revolución at San Ildefonso College in Mexico City, and presented La Curva del Olvido, a commission from the National Sound Archives for string sextet and electronics at MUAC, the National University Contemporary Arts Museum.

In 2011 he did a solo show at MUAC with an 18 channel audio installation entitled Glossa. Also in 2011 he was endowed with a three-year artist grant by the Mexican National Fund for Arts and Culture. In 2012 he obtained the EPROMUSICA prize from the Mexican Government to compose a piece for voice an electronics to be performed in 2014 at Diego Rivera's Museo Anahuacalli.

== Music for films ==
Besides Bajo California: El Límite del Tiempo, he also wrote the score for About the Living (2001), premiered in 2002 at the AFI Festival in L.A., for the documentary Der umgekehrte Blick, and for Two Embraces, winner of the 2007 Tribeca Film Festival.
