= The Stoned Guest (album) =

Studio album by P.D.Q. Bach
- Released: 1970
- Label: Vanguard

P.D.Q. Bach chronology
Report from Hoople: P.D.Q. Bach on the Air (1967)	The Stoned Guest (1970)	The Wurst of P.D.Q. Bach (1971)

The Stoned Guest is "the premiere recording of the Half-Act Opera by P.D.Q. Bach", the pseudonym used by Peter Schickele for parodic works. It was released on Vanguard Records in 1970. The title is a play on Dargomyzhsky's opera The Stone Guest. The record is a pseudo-radio broadcast hosted by "Milton Host" (parodying Metropolitan Opera commentator Milton Cross) including an appearance by "Paul Henry Lung" (a play on Paul Henry Lang) as a contestant on the intermission game "Opera Whiz" hosted by Schickele.

== Performers ==
- Entire fiasco under the supervision of Professor Peter Schickele
- The Orchestra of the University of Southern North Dakota at Hoople Heavy Opera Company under the direction of John Nelson
- Marlene Kleinman, mezzanine soprano (Donna Ribalda, a high-born lady of the lowlands)
- Lorna Haywood, off-coloratura (Carmen Ghia, a woman of ailing repute)
- John Ferrante, bargain counter tenor (Don Octave, an itinerant nobleman)
- Bernice, houndentenor (Dog)
- Will Jordan as Milton Host
- Bill Macy as Paul Henry Lung
- Amateur Musica Antiqua of Hoople

== Track listing ==
- Introduction
- Half-Act Opera: The Stoned Guest, S. 86 proof, Part One
  - Overture
  - Aria: "Let's face it — I'm lost"
  - Recitative: "Boy!"
  - Aria: "Now is the season"
  - Recitative: "Gesundheit!"
  - Duet: "Woe"
  - Recitative: "Hark!"
  - Aria: "Look at me"
  - Recitative: "That's the end"
  - Trio: "I'm sure I'd be"
- Intermission Feature: Opera Whiz
- Plot Synopsis
- Half-Act Opera: The Stoned Guest, S. 86 proof, Completion
  - Recitative: "I hate to interrupt"
  - Quartet: "Don Octave"
  - Finale: "O saviour"
- Announcement
- Two Madrigals from The Triumphs of Thusnelda, S. 1601
  - "The Queen to me a royal pain doth give"
  - "My bonnie lass she smelleth"

== Sources ==
P.D.Q. Bach: The Stoned Guest
