= Vincent Fanelli =

American musician (1883–1966)

Vincent Fanelli, harpist, Philadelphia Orchestra 1913–1930, and Kalamazoo Symphony Orchestra 1932-1961

Vincent Fanelli, Jr. (December 23, 1883 – March 2, 1966) was an American harpist, teacher, and handball enthusiast.

== Biography ==
Fanelli was born in New York City. His father, a Neapolitan, was his first harp teacher. By 1908 he was on the orchestra faculty at New York's Institute of Musical Art, now the Juilliard School, Dr. Frank Damrosch, director.

From 1913 to 1930 he was principal harpist of the Philadelphia Orchestra under Leopold Stokowski. A hand problem developed during this period requiring the re-fingering of his music. Eventually the entire hand became involved. As a result, Fanelli had to give up playing the harp to save his hand. From 1930 to 1932 he relocated to Gun Lake, Michigan and resided with his brother, a painter. He recuperated and felt encouraged to play the harp again. At or about this time he developed an interest in handball and eventually became as well known in this sport as he was in the field of harp playing. Fanelli played harp under other notable conductors including Arturo Toscanini, Walter Damrosch, and Reginald de Koven. In 1961, he retired from the Kalamazoo Symphony Orchestra after 29 years.

Vincent Fanelli died at his home on Staten Island, New York on March 2, 1966.
