= Music Forum =

Defunct academic journal

Music Forum was an academic journal (published in the form of a book series) specializing in music theory and analysis, with a particular focus on Schenkerian theory and analysis. It was published between 1967 and 1987.

According to David Carson Berry, Music Forum (MF) was "[f]ounded and edited jointly by Felix Salzer and William J. Mitchell," and was "published sporadically" from its debut in 1967 "until its sixth volume ... in 1987, the year after Salzer's death. As the editors proclaimed in the inaugural volume, MF was to have 'a definite and unifying point of view' traceable to Schenker's ideas (and their extensions). Although many of the articles in MF would address tonal music of the period studied by Schenker himself, the goal was also to publish the work of those 'who recognize the more universal values that lie dormant in [Schenker's] ideas and are capable of providing valuable insights into earlier and later music.' Whereas Schenker-influenced studies of twentieth-century or 'post-tonal' music had become relatively frequent following Salzer's Structural Hearing (1952), similar approaches to 'pre-tonal' music had been nearly non-existent since Salzer's Sinn und Wesen der abendlandischen Mehrstimmigkeit (1935), which was not widely available in the U.S. One of MF's legacies was changing that, as five such articles appeared in its initial two volumes ...."
