= The Intimate P. D. Q. Bach =

The Intimate P.D.Q. Bach

Live album by P.D.Q. Bach
- Released: 1973
- Label: Vanguard Records

P.D.Q. Bach chronology
The Wurst of P.D.Q. Bach (1971)	The Intimate P.D.Q. Bach (1973)	Portrait of P.D.Q. Bach (1977)

The Intimate P.D.Q. Bach is "a live recording of The Intimate P.D.Q. Bach stage show, featuring Professor Peter Schickele and the Semi-Pro Musica Antiqua" and was released on Vanguard Records in 1973. Many of the performer credits are humorous, and as with all P.D.Q. Bach recordings, the "S" numbers are fictitious and humorous. The cover art is a parody of the 1901 painting Kreutzer Sonata by René-Xavier Prinet.

== Performers ==
- Professor Peter Schickele, beriberitone, calliope, siren (Quaint Old Innkeeper, Hansel Hunter, Monk, Doctor)
- John Ferrante, bargain counter tenor, harpsichord, razzer (Gretel Red Riding Hood, Village Idiot, Teddy Nice)
- David Oei, piano, police whistle
- John Nelson, singist
- Peter Rosenfeld, celloist
- Arthur Weisberg, bassooner

== Track listing ==
- Spoken introduction
- Hansel and Gretel and Ted and Alice, an opera in one unnatural act, S. 2^{n}-1
  - Overture
  - Aria: "I am a quaint old innkeeper"
  - Aria: "Like a lonely pilgrim"
  - Aria: "My name is Hansel Hunter"
  - Aria: "I'm the village idiot"
  - Aria: "Et expecto" (Monk's Aria)
  - Aria: "There's something about a monk"
  - Duet: "Do you love me?"
  - Interlude: Medical examination
  - Aria: "I hope you'll take this friendly advice"
  - Aria: "Teddy Nice is my name"
  - Duet: "Jump not to conclusions"
  - Finale: "Just tell me what your name is"
- The O.K. Chorale from the Toot Suite for calliope four hands, S. 212°
- Spoken introduction
- "Erotica" Variations, for banned instruments and piano, S. 36EE
  - Theme: Windbreaker
  - Variation I: Balloons
  - Variation II: Slide Whistle
  - Variation III: Slide Windbreaker
  - Variation IV: Lasso D'Amore
  - Variation V: Foghorn, Bell, Kazoo, Gargle
- Spoken introduction
- The Art of the Ground Round, for three baritones and discontinuo, S. 1.19/lb
  - Loving is as easy
  - Please, kind sir
  - Jane, my Jane
  - Golly golly oh
  - Nelly is a nice girl

== Sources ==
- The Intimate P.D.Q. Bach, schickele.com
- The Intimate P.D.Q. Bach at Discogs, Vanguard Records VSD 79335 (1973)
