= David Oei =

Hong Kong-born American classical pianist

David Oei Chinese: 黃吉霖; pinyin: Huáng Jílín
- Born: 1950 (age 75–76); Hong Kong Occupied Territory
- Instrument: Piano
- Spouse: Eriko Sato

David Oei (Chinese: 黃吉霖; pinyin: Huáng Jílín; surname pronounced "Wee" in Hokkien, born 1950) is a Hong Kong-born American classical pianist.

== Early life and education ==
Oei was born in Hong Kong and started performing aged four. By the age of nine he had performed with the Hong Kong Philharmonic Orchestra. He was awarded eleven first prizes at the Hong Kong Music Festival. He attended the Interlochen Center for the Arts music camp for five years and won five concerto competitions there.

In 1964, aged 13, he performed Piano Concerto No. 20 (Mozart) with the Baltimore Symphony Orchestra; a reviewer wrote:

"Considering the age of the soloist, it was an outstanding performance and perhaps the critic should stop right there. Young David, however, is a musician, performing at an adult technical level in a world of adult artists. The critic, therefore, must consider his performance in that light also and then he was not quite so outstanding. ... Basically, Master David Oei has just not lived long enough to have acquired the emotional experience and understanding so necessary for superior interpretation of this work. It would be fortunate if we could hear him again in fifteen years. The comparison in the performances would undoubtedly be astounding."

Oei attended the Peabody Institute and the Juilliard School.

Other awards include WQXR Young Artists, Young Musicians Foundation (1972), and Paul Ulanowsky Chamber Pianists competitions.

He was a soloist in one of the Young People's Concerts conducted by Leonard Bernstein.

== Career ==
Oei has been a soloist with the New York Philharmonic, the Pittsburgh Symphony Orchestra and the Baltimore Symphony Orchestra. He has performed at Carnegie Hall.

He performed with Peter Schickele in The Intimate P. D. Q. Bach stage show.

In 2015, he was teaching at Mannes School of Music in the preparatory section.

== Sexual assault ==
In 2015, Oei was accused of sexually assaulting a 15-year-old music student. He accepted his guilt and agreed a plea deal.

== Personal life ==
Oei lives in New York City with his wife, the violinist Eriko Sato.

== Discography ==
- 1974: The Intimate P. D. Q. Bach: John Ferrante (countertenor), David Oei (piano) (Vanguard)
- 1978: Karel Husa Sonata: Elmar Oliveira (violin), David Oei (piano) (New World Records)
- 1980: PDQ Bach Liebeslieder Polkas: David Oei (piano), Anne Epperson (piano) (Vanguard)
- 1984: Peter Schickele Clarinet Quartet: Eriko Sato (violin), Fred Sherry (cello), David Shifrin (clarinet), David Oei (piano) (Vanguard)
- 1989: Schumann & Grieg: Sonia Wieder-Atherton (cello), David Oei (piano) (Adda)
- 1989: David Schiff: Gimpel the Fool: Theodore Arm (violin), Warren Lash (cello), David Shifrin (clarinet), David Oei (piano) (Delos Productions)
- 1990: Miriam Gideon Retrospective: Patricia Spencer (flute), David Oei (piano) (New World Records)
- 1993: Prokofiev Violin Sonata No. 2: Chin Kim (violin), David Oei (piano) (Pro Arte)
- 1995: Alec Wilder Works For Horn: David Jolley (horn), David Oei (piano) (Arabesque Records)
- 1997: Old Friends: Christopher Lee (violin), David Oei (piano) (Quattro Corde)
- 2004: Karel Husa Recollections: Quintet of the Americas, David Oei (piano) (New World Records)
- 2005: Donald Crockett Ceiling Of Heaven: Renee Jolles (violin), Nicolas Cords (viola), Edward Aaron (cello), David Oei (piano) (Albany Records)
- 2007: Strauss and Rachmaninoff Sonatas: Ruth Sommers (cello), David Oei (piano) (FCM)
- 2008: The Lay of Love and Death of the Cornet Christoph Rilke by Viktor Ullmann: David Oei (piano), Lutz Rath (speaker)
- 2010: Five Not-So-Easy Pieces: David Oei (piano), Eriko Sato (violin) (Prestissimo)
