= Felix Salzer =

Austrian-American music theorist, musicologist and pedagogue (1904-1986)

Felix Salzer (June 13, 1904 – August 12, 1986) was an Austrian-American music theorist, musicologist and pedagogue. He was one of the principal followers of Heinrich Schenker, and did much to refine and explain Schenkerian analysis after Schenker's death.

== Life and career ==
He was born on June 13, 1904 in Vienna to Max Salzer (a doctor) and Helene Wittgenstein (a daughter of Karl Wittgenstein). He studied musicology with Guido Adler at the University of Vienna, finishing his Ph.D. in 1926 with a dissertation on sonata form in the works of Franz Schubert. At the same time he studied music theory and analysis with Heinrich Schenker and Hans Weisse. In 1939 Salzer emigrated to the United States, and became a citizen in 1945. While in the US he taught at several schools, including the Mannes School of Music where he was the long-time Dean and Queens College of the City University of New York. At Mannes, Salzer was the teacher of Carl Schachter and Adele T. Weiss. While teaching at Mannes, Salzer and Schacter went on to co-author the seminal music theory book: "Counterpoint in Composition."

His contributions to Schenkerian theory were twofold: first, he brought Schenker's ideas to the attention of American music theorists and musicologists, and second, he applied the analytical technique to music outside of the common-practice era music in which Schenker had exclusively worked, particularly to the music of the Renaissance, the Middle Ages, and to some music of the 20th century. Later theorists applied Schenkerian techniques to popular music as well.

Some of the specific refinements Salzer made to Schenkerian theory involve aspects of voice leading, and the differentiation of chords into structural versus contrapuntal categories.

Salzer's works include Structural Hearing (1952 and 1962), Counterpoint in Composition: The Study of Voice Leading (with Carl Schachter, 1969), and the periodical The Music Forum (initiated 1967).

Salzer married Hedwig Lindtberg (the sister of Leopold Lindtberg) in 1939. She died on February 29, 2000. They had no children.

== References and further reading ==
- Novack, Saul (1980). "Salzer, Felix". In Sadie, Stanley (ed.). The New Grove Dictionary of Music and Musicians. Vol. xvi (1st ed.). London: Macmillan. p. 444.
- Allen Forte. "Schenker, Heinrich" in ibid., xvi, 627-628.
- The Concise Edition of Baker's Biographical Dictionary of Musicians, 8th ed. Revised by Nicolas Slonimsky. New York, Schirmer Books, 1993. ISBN 0-02-872416-X
- David Carson Berry, "Hans Weisse and the Dawn of American Schenkerism," Journal of Musicology 20/1 (2003): 104-156.
- David Carson Berry, "Schenkerian Theory in the United States: A Review of Its Establishment and a Survey of Current Research Topics," Zeitschrift der Gesellschaft für Musiktheorie 2/2-3 (2005): 101-137 (online version at http://www.gmth.de/zeitschrift/artikel/206.aspx).
