= The Stoned Guest =

Opera by P. D. Q. Bach

The Stoned Guest is a "half-act opera" by Peter Schickele in the satirical persona of P. D. Q. Bach. The title is a play on the "stone guest" character in Don Giovanni by Mozart, as well as the opera The Stone Guest by Alexander Sergeyevich Dargomïzhsky after the play by Pushkin. The work is a parody of classical opera. The opera appears on the 1970 album of the same name.

The loose story combines elements of Don Giovanni with elements of Carmen by Georges Bizet. Some character names, such as "Don Octave" and "Donna Ribalda", play on the Mozart opera, referring to Don Ottavio and Donna Elvira respectively, while the castanet-clicking "Carmen Ghia" plays on the title character of Bizet's opera (and puns on the Volkswagen Karmann Ghia). The "Commendatoreador" plays on both operas at once, being a combination of "Il Commendatore" and the toreador Escamillo. The orchestral accompaniment for Donna Ribalda's opening aria, "Let's face it—I'm lost", resembles the "Rex tremendae majestatis" from Mozart's Requiem.

At one point in the opera, the rival divas Carmen Ghia and Donna Ribalda break character in the middle of a recitative to hold a conversation (still in recitative) about their singing careers. At a subsequent point, they have a contest to see who can hold a note the longest. The final scenes of the opera parody first the stereotype (exemplified by Don Giovanni itself) of classical opera as having a tragic ending and then the stereotype of the Romantic narrative (as reflected in, e.g., Goethe's revision of the Faust legend) by revealing the tragic ending to have been a false ending and introducing deus ex machina to generate a happy conclusion not warranted by the earlier plot.
