= Colored Music Settlement School =

Music School Settlement for Colored People

Location
- 417 W 114th St; New York City, New York; 40.8054316°N 73.9634711°W

Information
- Type: Private, segregated
- Founded: 1915
- Founder: David Mannes
- Closed: 1919
- Head teacher: J. Rosamond Johnson

The Music School Settlement for Colored People, often referred to as the Colored Music Settlement School, was a historically black music school in New York City. Founded by David Mannes in 1915, the school was principally led by teacher J. Rosamond Johnson. When Johnson resigned from his post in 1919, the school was subsumed into another existing historically black music school, the Martin-Smith School of Music.

== History ==
The Music School Settlement for Colored People was a New York City school established and operated to provide music education for African-American children, who were generally excluded from other music schools. The school was founded in the memory of violinist and composer John Thomas Douglass.

The term “settlement school” is to be understood within the context of the settlement movement started in 1884 in London. Growing concern in Victorian England concerning poverty gave rise to a movement whereby those connected to universities settled students in slum areas to live and work alongside local people. Through their efforts, “settlement houses” were established for education, savings, sports, and arts. “Settlement schools” are adjuncts of organizations founded to provide education in various disciplines to the needy. In the United States, the two largest and most influential settlement houses were Chicago's Hull House (founded by Jane Addams and Ellen Gates Starr in 1889) and the Henry Street Settlement in New York (founded by Lillian Wald in 1893).

During the 1911-12 season, David Mannes, a European-American violinist, and other supporters founded "The Music School Settlement for Colored People". It was to enable "for the first time in the history of the nation the opportunity for talented black youngsters to obtain excellent musical training at nominal fees."

In keeping with institutionalized segregation of the times, the school was founded to be an African American version of the Music School Settlement, which did not accept Black students. The Music School Settlement for Colored People is a small chapter in the much larger history of African-American education in the early 20th century.

In 1919 the Colored Music Settlement School was subsumed into the Martin-Smith School of Music after J. Rosamond Johnson resigned.

== See also ==
- Settlement school
