= Leopold Damrosch =

German-American conductor and composer (1832–1885)

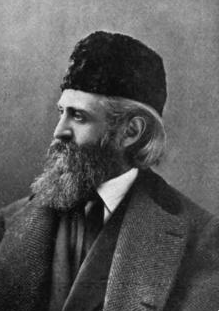
- Damrosch in 1904
- Born: 22 October 1832; Poznań, Posen, Kingdom of Prussia
- Died: 15 February 1885 (aged 52)
- Education: University of Berlin (PhD)
- Occupations: Conductor; composer; violinist; teacher
- Style: Classical
- Children: Frank Damrosch, Walter Damrosch

Leopold Damrosch (22 October 1832 – 15 February 1885) was a German-American orchestral conductor, composer, violinist, and teacher. He was the patriarch of the Damrosch family, which includes Frank and Walter Damrosch.

== Biography ==
Damrosch was born in Poznań, Posen, Kingdom of Prussia, the son of Heinrich Damrosch. His father was Jewish and his mother was Lutheran. Damrosch was baptized a Lutheran when marrying his wife, and former opera singer, Helene von Heimburg.

Damrosch began his musical education at the age of nine, learning the violin against the wishes of his parents, who wanted him to become a doctor. Capitulating to the wishes of his parents, he entered the University of Berlin and completed his PhD in medicine, but during his spare time he studied violin under Franz Ries, and figured bass with Siegfried Dehn and Bohmer. After he completed his degree, Damrosch decided to dedicate his life and energy to music. He gained fame as a violinist and began to play to large audiences in many major German cities including Berlin and Hamburg. He went to Weimar and was received by Franz Liszt, who appointed him solo violinist in the Ducal orchestra.

It has been said mistakenly that Liszt dedicated his symphonic poem Tasso: lamento e trionfo to Damrosch. However, Liszt did dedicate the similarly named Le Triomphe funèbre du Tasse, the third part of Trois odes funèbres, to Damrosch, who conducted the first performance in New York on 24 March 1877.

Damrosch first appeared as a conductor during the season of 1859, where he conducted the philharmonic concerts in Breslau. He continued to conduct the philharmonic there for three years due to the success of this season. In 1862, Damrosch founded a symphonic society in Breslau with an orchestra of 80 performers, modelled after the Gewandhaus concerts of Leipzig.

This society gained fame throughout Germany, and Damrosch invited Liszt to conduct several of the performances, an invitation which he accepted. Richard Wagner also accepted the invitation to conduct his own manuscript compositions in the winter of 1867.

In 1871, Damrosch emigrated to the United States at the invitation of the Arion Society of New York. At his first concerts in the US, he introduced himself as a conductor, composer and violinist. At his successful debut in New York on 6 May 1871, Damrosch played as violin soloist at the first time with the New York Philharmonic, performing Beethoven's Violin Concerto, with his own cadenza on the program, at the Academy of Music. He participated in many concerts over this period, and in 1873, he founded the Oratorio Society of New York. The first concert of this society was later that year and consisted of a programme of works by Johann Sebastian Bach, George Frideric Handel, Giovanni Pierluigi da Palestrina and others. In 1874 Damrosch gave another concert at the Oratorio Society, this the first with a full orchestra, consisting of Handel's Samson. For Christmas that year Messiah was performed.

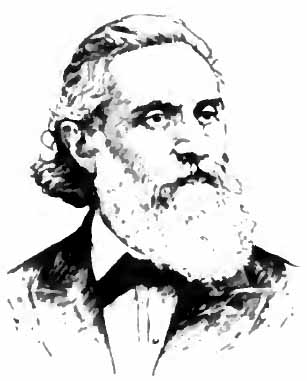
Portrait drawing of Damrosch

In 1876, Damrosch succeeded Carl Bergmann at the helm of the New York Philharmonic, but his high-minded programming – e.g. the entire first act of Wagner's Die Walküre – frightened the typical New York subscriber, so his tenure with the orchestra was over.

In 1877 Damrosch, in connection with a number of persons interested in the cultivation of orchestral music, established the Symphony society. This society became closely identified with the Oratorio Society and several joint performances were organized. The co-operation of these societies reached its climax in the great "musical festival" which was held in the armory of the 7th regiment in New York, from 3 till 7 May 1881. The chorus numbered 1,200, the main body being the Oratorio Society, which was augmented by various choral societies from neighboring towns. An additional chorus of 1,000 young ladies from the Normal College and 250 boys from the Church choirs took part in the afternoon concerts. The orchestra was composed of 250 pieces, and Dr. Damrosch selected a large number of artists for soloists. Among the choral works performed were Handel's Dettingen Te Deum and Messiah; Rubinstein's Tower of Babel (first time); Berlioz's Grande Messe des Mortes (first time); and Beethoven's Ninth Symphony. The audience numbered from 8,000 to 10,000 at each concert, and the enthusiasm for the projector of this enterprise resulted in an ovation on the last night. The degree of Doctor of Music was conferred upon him by Columbia in 1880.

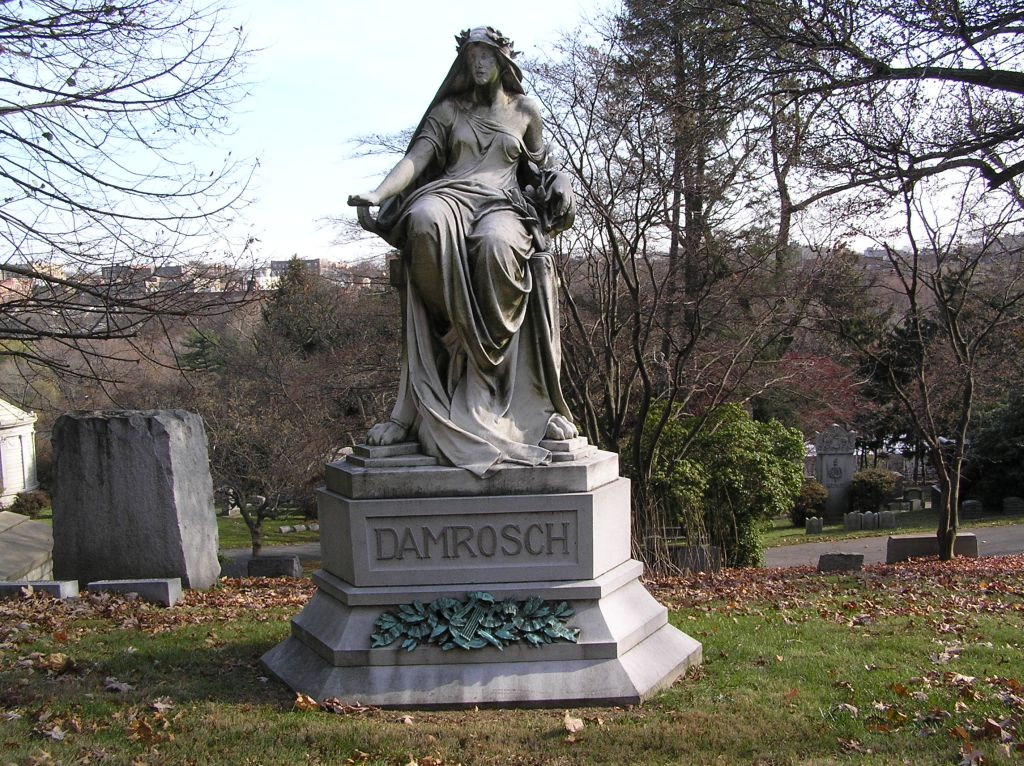
Grave of Damrosch in Woodlawn Cemetery

In 1883, Damrosch traveled extensively through the west with his orchestra. In September 1884, he began a remarkable series of operatic performances as general manager and chief conductor of the Metropolitan Opera in New York. The company had experienced great financial losses during its first season of Italian opera under director Henry Abbey. For its second season it turned to Damrosch to direct the company in German repertory. The company comprised some of the greatest artists of the German opera houses, and, in contrast with the hitherto prevailing mode, every part, even the smallest, was carefully presented. Twelve of the operas performed were comparative novelties, the most important of which were Wagner's Tannhäuser, Lohengrin, and Die Walküre, and Beethoven's Fidelio. This proved to be Damrosch's last effort. He conducted every performance except during the last week of his life, when he took a severe cold, from which he never recovered. He died in New York City in 1885. His funeral was held at the Metropolitan Opera House. Damrosch was buried in Woodlawn Cemetery in The Bronx, New York City.

== Family ==
His sons Frank Damrosch and Walter Damrosch, both born in Breslau, in 1859 and 1862 respectively, both succeeded him as conductors of the Oratorio Society of New York. His daughter, Clara Mannes, was a music teacher. His grandchildren were musician Leopold Mannes, writer Marya Mannes, and artist Helen Damrosch Tee-Van. Damrosch Park at the Lincoln Center in Manhattan is named after the family.

== Works ==
- Am Manzanares, Op. 11, no. 10
- An, Op. 8, no. 5
- An den Mond, Op. 17, no. 4
- Bedeckt mich mit Blumen, Op. 11, no. 3
- Bedeckt mich mit Blumen, Op. 11, no. 7
- Bitte, Op. 5 no. 1
- Cantatas 1–7
- Das Meer erstrahlt im Sonnenschein, Op. 16, no. 1
- Dereinst, dereinst, Op. 11, no. 4
- Dich lieb' ich inniglich, Op. 7, no. 3 (E. Kern)
- Die blauen Frühlingsaugen, Op. 13, no. 3
- Die du bist so schön und rein, Op. 10, no. 3
- Es war ein alter König, Op. 10, no. 4
- Fantasie for Violin and Orchestra
- Frühling, Op. 16, no. 2
- Frühlingslied, Op. 6, no. 3
- Geh, Geliebter, geh jetzt!, Op. 11, no. 6
- Hör' ich das Liedchen klingen, Op. 10, no. 2
- Ich halte ihr die Augen zu, Op. 16, no. 4
- Ich hatte einst ein schönes Vaterland, Op. 13, no. 2
- Ich liebe dich, Op. 8, no. 1
- In der Ferne, Op. 10, no. 1
- Jedweder Geselle, sein Mädel im Arm, Op. 16, no. 5
- Kalt und schneidend weht der Wind, Op. 8, no. 8
- Kommen und Scheiden, Op. 5, no. 4
- Liebesfrühling, Op. 5, no. 5
- Liebesgruss, Op. 14, no. 1 (Volkslieder (Folksongs))
- Lied des Fischerknaben
- Mädchen mit dem roten Mündchen, Op. 10, no. 6
- Mignon, Op. 17, no. 2
- Nachhall, Op. 5, no. 2 ((Ignaz) Julius Lasker)
- Nachtgesang, Op. 17, no. 3
- Nähe des Geliebten, Op. 17, no. 1
- Nelken wind' ich und Jasmin, Op. 11, no. 5
- Orchesterstück (1859)
- Schiller's Joan of Arc
- Siegfrieds Schwert
- Sulamith
- Symphony in A major (1878)
- Trost, Op. 8, no. 6 (Joseph Christian Freiherrn von Zedlitz)
- Violin Concerto in D minor (pub. by Bote & Bock, 1878). One of at least two violin concertos by the composer; the other, also in D minor, dates from 1874.
- Von dem Rosenbusch, o Mutter, Op. 11, no. 2
- Wandl' ich in dem Wald des Abends, Op. 16, no. 3
- Wenn ich auf dem Lager liege, Op. 10, no. 5
- Wenn ich ihn nur habe, Op. 7, no. 2
- Wieder möcht' ich dir begegnen, Op. 8, no. 9
- Zuléikha, Op. 6, no. 2
- Zuversicht, Op. 5, no. 3 ((Ignaz) Julius Lasker)
