= Clara Mannes =

German-American music educator (1869–1948)

- Born: Clara Damrosch; 12 December 1869; Breslau, Silesia
- Died: 16 March 1948 (aged 78); New York City
- Occupation: Musician
- Spouse: David Mannes

Clara Mannes (née Damrosch; 12 December 1869 – 16 March 1948) was a German-born American musician and music educator. She and her brother Frank Damrosch also taught at the Veltin School for Girls in Manhattan. With her husband, David Mannes, she founded the David Mannes Music School in 1916, now known as the Mannes School of Music at the New School.

Mannes was born in Breslau. Her mother, Helene von Heimburg, was a former opera singer, and her father was conductor Leopold Damrosch. Her siblings were conductors Frank Damrosch and Walter Damrosch. Her parents were Lutheran (her paternal grandfather was Jewish). Her children were musician Leopold Mannes and author Marya Mannes.
