= Edward Aldwell =

American pianist, music theorist and pedagogue

- Born: January 30, 1938; Portland, Oregon, US
- Died: May 28, 2006 (aged 68) Valhalla, New York, US
- Occupations: Pianist, music theorist, pedagogue
- Instrument: Piano

Edward Aldwell (January 30, 1938 – May 28, 2006) was an American pianist, music theorist and pedagogue.

He was particularly renowned for his Bach interpretations, and he recorded several albums, most notably the complete Well-Tempered Clavier of Bach for Nonesuch, and Bach's French Suites for Hanssler Classics. He taught at The Curtis Institute of Music in Philadelphia and at the Mannes College of Music in New York City.

As a theorist, he was an expert in Schenkerian analysis, and he was the co-author (with Carl Schachter) of one of the standard theory textbooks used throughout the United States, Harmony and Voice Leading (first published in 1979). While driving an all-terrain vehicle, on May 7, 2006, near his country home in Kerhonkson, New York, he suffered serious injuries when it overturned. He died from those injuries in Valhalla, New York, three weeks later.
