= Carl Schachter =

American music theorist (1932–2026)

Carl E. Schachter (June 1, 1932 – May 22, 2026) was an American music theorist noted for his expertise in Schenkerian analysis. A student of Felix Salzer, his most influential publications include Harmony and Voice Leading (1979) with Edward Aldwell and Counterpoint in Composition (1989) with Salzer.

== Life and career ==
Carl E. Schachter was born in Chicago, Illinois, on June 1, 1932. He attended Austin High School, graduating at age 16. Beginning in 1948 he began studies at the Mannes School of Music. He studied piano with Sara Levee, Isabelle Vengerova and Israel Citkowitz, and conducting with Carl Bamberger. Most significantly he studied with Felix Salzer, who was later co-author with Schachter of the influential text Counterpoint in Composition. He received a Bachelor of Science from Mannes; an MA from New York University (musicology); and a DM from Mannes College of Music.

Among Schachter's noted students are Murray Perahia, Richard Goode, Frederica von Stade, Rami Bar-Niv, Myung-whun Chung, and Edward Aldwell (who was co-author with Schachter of another influential text, Harmony and Voice Leading).

He held visiting professorships at Hunter College, Binghamton University, Harvard University, Mannes College of Music and École Normale Superieure de Jeunes Filles (Paris). He was Professor of Music at Queens College and the CUNY Graduate School from 1972 to 1993, where he held the position of Distinguished Professor of Music, 1993–1996.

Schachter's association with the Mannes College of Music began as a student in 1948. After graduation in 1953, Schachter became a member of the Techniques of Music faculty in 1956; Chair of Theory Department, 1958–1962; Dean of Mannes, 1962–1966; and Chair of Techniques of Music Department 1966–1973. He also served on the faculty of the Juilliard School.

Schachter died on May 22, 2026, at the age of 93.

== Selected works ==
=== Books ===
- With Felix Salzer. Counterpoint in Composition. New edition (1st 1969). Columbia University Press, 1989.
- Unfoldings. Essays in Schenkerian Theory and Analysis. Oxford University Press, 1999.
- The Art of Tonal Analysis. Twelve Lessons in Schenkerian Theory. J. N. Strauss ed. Oxford University Press, 2016.
- With Edward Aldwell and Allen Cadwallader. Harmony and Voice leading. Cengage, 2019.

=== Articles ===
- "More about Schubert's Op. 94/1". Journal of Music Theory 13/2 (1969), pp. 218–229.
- "Landini’s Treatment of Consonance and Dissonance. A Study in Fourteenth-Century Counterpoint". The Music Forum 2 (1970), pp. 130–186.
- "Rhythm and Linear Analysis: A Preliminary Study". The Music Forum 4 (1976), pp. 281–334.
- "Schubert, Op. 94 no. 1: A Schenkerian Analysis". Readings in Schenker Analysis and Other Approaches. M. Yeston ed., Yale University Press, 1977, pp. 171–184.
- "Diversity and the Decline of Literacy in Music Theory". College Music Symposium 17/1 (1977), pp. 150–153.
- "Rhythm and Linear Analysis: Durational Reduction". The Music Forum 5 (1980), pp. 197–232.
- "A Commentary on Schenker's Free Composition". Journal of Music Theory 25/1 (1981), pp. 115–142.
- "Beethoven's Sketches for the First Movement of Op. 14, No. 1: A Study in Design". Journal of Music Theory 26/1 (1982), pp. 1–21.
- "Motive and Text in Four Schubert Songs". Aspects of Schenkerian Theory. D. W. Beach ed., Yale University Press, 1983, pp. 61–76.
- "The First Movement of Brahms's Second Symphony: The Opening Theme and Its Consequences". Music Analysis 2/1 (1983), pp. 55–68.
- "Analysis by Key: Another Look at Modulation". Music Analysis 6/3 (1987), pp. 289–318.
- "Rhythm and Linear Analysis: Aspects of Meter". The Music Forum 6 (1987), pp. 1–59.
- "Schenker's Counterpoint". The Musical Times 129/1748 (1988), pp. 524–529
- "Either/or". Schenker Studies. H. Siegel ed., Cambridge University Press, 1990, pp. 165–179..
- "The Adventures of an F♯: Tonal Narration and Exhortation in Donna Anna's First-Act Recitative and Aria". Theory and Practice 16 (1991), pp. 5–20.
- "20th-Century Analysis and Mozart Performance". Early Music 19/4 (1991), pp. 620–626
- "The Prelude from Bach's Suite No.4 for Violoncello Solo: The Submerged Urlinie". Current Musicology 56 (1994), pp. 54–71.
- "The Sketches for Beethoven’s Sonata for Piano and Violin, Op. 24". Beethoven Forum 3 (1994), pp. 107–125.
- "The Prelude in E Minor, Op. 28, No. 4: Autograph Sources and Interpretation". Chopin's Studies 2, J. Rink and J. Sampson ed., Cambridge University Press, 1994, pp.
- "Chopin’s Prelude in D Major, Opus 28, No. 5: Analysis and Performance". Journal of Music Theory Pedagogy 8 (1994), pp. 27–45.
- "The Triad as Place and Action". Music Theory Spectrum 17/2 (1995), pp. 149–169.
- “Playing What the Composer Didn't Write: Analysis and Rhythmic Aspects of Performance". Pianist, Scholar, Connoisseur: Essays in Honor of Jacob Lateiner. Bruce Brubaker and Jane Gottlieb ed., Pendragon Press, 2000, pp. 47–68.
- "Structure as Foreground: 'das Drama des Ursatzes'". Schenker Studies 2. C. Schachter and H. Siegel ed., Cambridge University Press, 1999, pp. 298–314.
- "Taking Care of the Sense: A Schenkerian Pedagogy for Performers". Tijdschrift voor Muziektheorie 6/3 (2001), pp. 1–20.
- "Elephants, Crocodiles, and Beethoven: Schenker's Politics and the Pedagogy of Schenkerian Analysis". Theory and Practice 26 (2001), pp. 1–20
- "Che Inganno! The Analysis of Deceptive Cadences". Essays from the Third International Schenker Symposium. Hildesheim, Olms, 2006, pp. 279–298.
- "Felix Salzer (1904–1986)". Schenker-Traditionenen. Eine Wiener Schule der Musitheorie und ihre internationale Verbreitung, M. Eybl and E. Fink-Mennel ed., Wien, Böhlau, 2006, pp. 105–111.
- "E Pluribus Unum: Large-Scale Connections in the Opening Scenes of Don Giovanni". Essays from the Fourth International Schenker Symposium. Vol. I. Hildesheim, Olms, 2008, pp. 279–298.
- "Chopin’s Mazurka, Op. 59, No. 2: A Tribute to Mendelssohn?" New Horizons in Schenkerian Research. A. Cadwallader, K. M. Bottge and O. Schwab-Felisch ed., Hildesheim, Olms, 2022, pp. 73–83.
