= Mannes School of Music =

Music school in New York City

- Type: Private music conservatory
- Established: 1916
- Parent institution: The New School
- Dean: Richard Kessler
- Students: 950 across two divisions: College: 500; Preparatory: 450
- Location: New York City, New York, United States; 40°44′12″N 73°59′48″W
- Campus: Urban
- Colors: Parsons red
- Website: newschool.edu/mannes

The Mannes School of Music (/ˈmænɪs/), originally called the David Mannes Music School and later the Mannes Music School, Mannes College of Music, the Chatham Square Music School, and Mannes College: The New School for Music, is a music conservatory in The New School, a private research university in New York City. In the fall of 2015, Mannes moved from its previous location on Manhattan's Upper West Side to join the rest of the New School campus in Arnhold Hall at 55 W. 13th Street.

== History ==
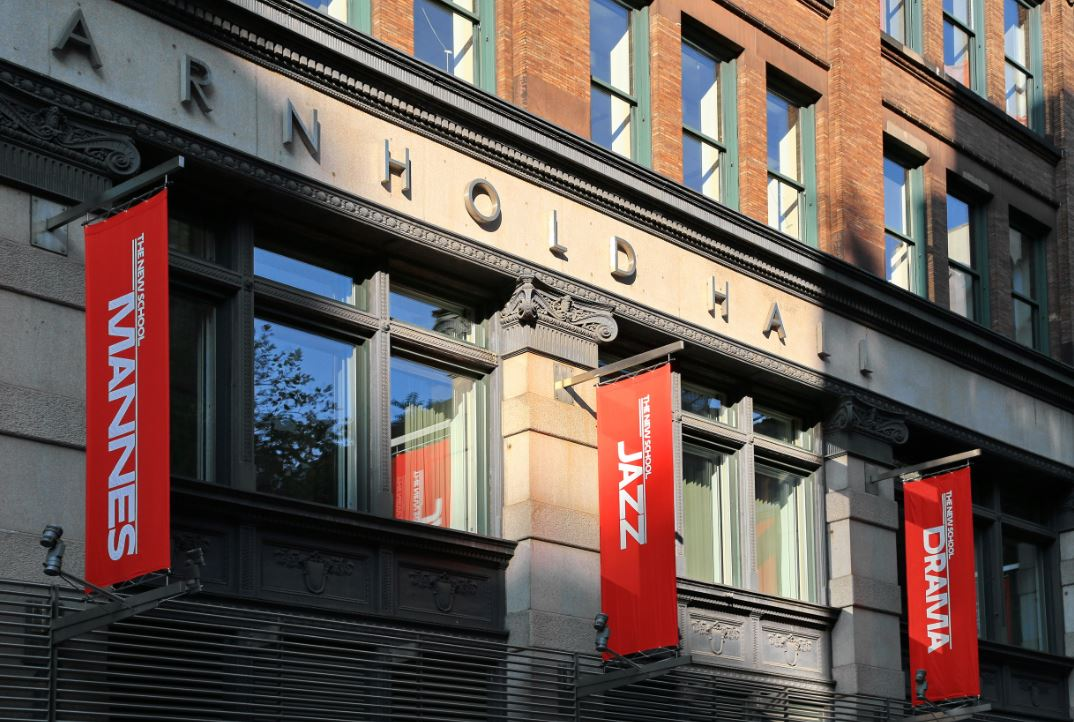
Mannes School of Music (2016)

Originally called The David Mannes Music School, it was founded in 1916 by David Mannes, concertmaster of the New York Symphony Orchestra, and his wife Clara Damrosch, sister of Walter Damrosch, then-conductor of that orchestra, and Frank Damrosch. The Damrosch and Mannes families were perhaps the most important music families in America at that time, with David Mannes emerging as one of the first American-born violin recitalists to achieve significant status. David Mannes was the director of the Third Street Music School Settlement as well as founder of Colored Music Settlement School, all prior to founding the Mannes School. The school was originally housed on East 70th Street (later occupied by the Dalcroze School).

A larger campus was created out of four converted brownstones, beginning at 157 East 74th Street, in Manhattan's Upper East Side. After 1938, the school was known as the Mannes Music School in recognition of the broader course of study that expanded the school well beyond that of a community music school, including the three-year Artist Diploma. When Clara died in 1948, their son, Leopold Mannes, became president.

In 1953, the school began offering a Bachelor of Science degree and changed its name to the Mannes College of Music. In 1960, it merged with the Chatham Square Music School. In 1984, the school moved to larger quarters on West 85th Street.

In 1989, Mannes joined The New School. In 2005, the New School administration changed the name to Mannes College: the New School for Music. In 2015, the university renamed it Mannes School of Music, and moved it to Arnhold Hall in Manhattan's West Village. It is part of The New School College of Performing Arts, which also includes the School of Drama and the School of Jazz and Contemporary Music. The students in any of the three schools of The New School College of Performing Arts may take courses in drama, jazz, and music.

== Academics ==
Two academic divisions constitute the conservatory:

- College: the academic spine of the school, conferring undergraduate and graduate degrees and diplomas
- Preparatory: pre-college training for children and adolescents

The Techniques of Music program is the foundation for academic musical study in the two divisions at Mannes, encompassing the range of elementary to advanced music theory and aural skills and analysis classes.

Music theory was taught at Mannes from its inception, with David Mannes hiring important figures such as Ernest Bloch and Rosario Scalero to teach theory and composition. In 1931 Mannes hired Hans Weisse, a student of Austrian music theorist Heinrich Schenker. Over the following nine years, Weisse promoted not just the study of Schenkerian analysis but also the incorporation of it into the musical life of the school, including performance and composition. Schenker's publication Five Graphic Music Analyses (Fünf Urlinie-Tafeln) was published jointly by Mannes and Universal Edition in 1932.

In 1940, Weisse was replaced by Felix Salzer, who had also been a student of Schenker. Mannes continued to build on Weisse's foundation by reorganizing the theory program into the Techniques of Music Department. Salzer's purpose was and to integrate the school's approach to musicianship, theory, and performance, based on Schenker's focus on the role of theory in tonal music. Salzer was later joined on the faculty by his own student, Carl Schachter. Subsequently, Schacter's own students continued and strengthened the department in this tradition.

In the 2020s, Mannes revised and expanded its program. The curriculum added courses in music technology, improvisation ensemble, teaching artistry, arts journalism, film music composition, and creative entrepreneurship. The school has further enhanced its commitment to contemporary music beyond the tonal-based, eurocentric approach of Schenker. The Mannes of today includes a number of programs in partnership with its sister conservatory, School of Jazz.

== Notable people ==
=== College faculty ===
- Timo Andres – Composition
- Michael Bacon – film composition
- Ernest Bloch – composition
- Howard Brockway – piano
- William Burden – voice
- Semyon Bychkov – conducting
- Uri Caine – Piano Improvisation
- Joseph Colaneri – Director of Opera Program
- Valerie Coleman – flute, composition
- Alfred Cortot – piano
- Robert Cuckson – composition, theory, analysis
- Mario Davidovsky – composition
- Elaine Douvas – oboe
- George Enescu – interpretation
- Ruth Falcon – voice
- Vladimir Feltsman – piano
- Lillian Fuchs – violin, chamber music
- Felix Galimir – violin, chamber music
- Richard Goode – piano
- David Hayes – conducting (present Director of Orchestral and Conducting Studies)
- Matt Haimovitz – cello
- Robert Hurwitz – Music Business
- Anna Jacobs – Art of Engagement
- Leila Josefowicz – Violin
- Charles Kaufman – history, theory, president
- Jennifer Koh – violin
- Yakov Kreizberg – conducting
- William Kroll – violin
- Lowell Liebermann – composition
- Clara Mannes – chamber music
- David Mannes – conducting, violin
- Leopold Mannes – theory
- Bohuslav Martinů – composition
- Missy Mazzoli – composition
- Frank Miller – cello
- Mitch Miller – oboe, English horn
- Jeremy McCoy – Double Bass
- Jessie Montgomery – violinist and composer
- David Nadien – violinist
- Charles Neidich – clarinet
- Paul Neubauer – viola
- Arturo O'Farrill – Music Composition
- David Oei - piano
- Frank J. Oteri – musicology
- Anna Jacobs – Art of Engagement
- Cynthia Phelps – viola
- Erik Ralske – horn
- Nadia Reisenberg – piano
- Lucie Robert – violin
- Hal Robinson – Double Bass
- Jerome Rose – piano
- Richard Rychtarik – stagecraft
- Felix Salzer – theory
- Rosario Scalero – solfege, theory, composition
- Carl Schachter – theory
- George Szell – composition, instrumentation, theory
- Terry Teachout – arts journalism
- Ronald Thomas – cello, chamber music
- Sally Thomas – violin
- Roman Totenberg – violin
- Rosalyn Tureck – piano
- Ronald Turini – piano
- William Vacchiano – trumpet
- Vladimir Valjarevic – piano
- David Van Tieghem – sound design, experimental music
- Glen Velez – percussion
- Isabelle Vengerova – piano
- Stefan Wolpe – composition
- John Zorn – curator

=== Alumni ===
- Nomi Abadi – composer
- Edward Aldwell – pianist and theorist
- Burt Bacharach – composer and pianist
- Robert Bass – conductor
- Jeremy Beck – composer
- Johanna Beyer – composer
- Semyon Bychkov – conductor
- Michel Camilo – pianist and composer
- Myung-whun Chung – conductor and pianist
- Kvitka Cisyk – opera singer, coloratura soprano
- Valerie Coleman – flutist and composer, Imani Winds
- Larry Coryell – guitarist
- Lee Curreri – film and television composer
- Danielle de Niese – lyric soprano
- Mark Degli Antoni – film composer and member of Soul Coughing

- Erik Della Penna – composer-lyricist and guitarist
- Ezinma – violinist
- Bill Evans – pianist and composer
- JoAnn Falletta – conductor
- Antonio Fernandez Roz – composer
- Richard Goode – pianist
- Mary Rodgers Guettel – composer and philanthropist
- Joy Guidry – bassoonist and composer
- Rebekah Harkness – founder of the Harkness Ballet
- Eugene Istomin – pianist
- Marta Casals Istomin – arts administrator
- Jeannette Knoll – opera singer
- Yakov Kreizberg – conductor
- Yonghoon Lee – tenor
- Ursula Mamlok – composer
- Douglas McLennan – arts journalist, founder of Artsjournal.com
- Peter Mendelsund – graphic designer
- Charlie Morrow – composer and sound artist
- David Nadien – violinist
- Hafez Nazeri – composer
- Patricia Neway – operatic soprano and musical theatre actress
- Anthony Newman – keyboardist
- Tim Page – music critic
- Charlemagne Palestine – composer
- Murray Perahia – pianist
- Maurice Peress – conductor
- Eve Queler – conductor
- Shulamit Ran – composer
- Kevin Riepl – composer
- Michael Riesman – conductor, composer, keyboardist, music director of Philip Glass Ensemble

- George Rochberg – composer
- Adam Rogers – jazz guitarist
- Jerome Rose – piano
- Alexandros Kapelis – piano
- Beatrice Schroeder Rose - harp
- Donald Rosenberg – arts journalist
- Julius Rudel – conductor
- Carl Schachter – musicologist and theorist
- Nadine Sierra – soprano
- Lawrence Leighton Smith – conductor
- Lara St. John – violinist
- Jonathan Tetelman – tenor
- Jory Vinikour – harpsichordist
- Frederica von Stade – mezzo-soprano
- Craig Walsh – composer
- Ivan Yanakov – pianist
- Jennifer Zetlan – soprano
