= Frank Damrosch =

German-born American music conductor (1859–1937)

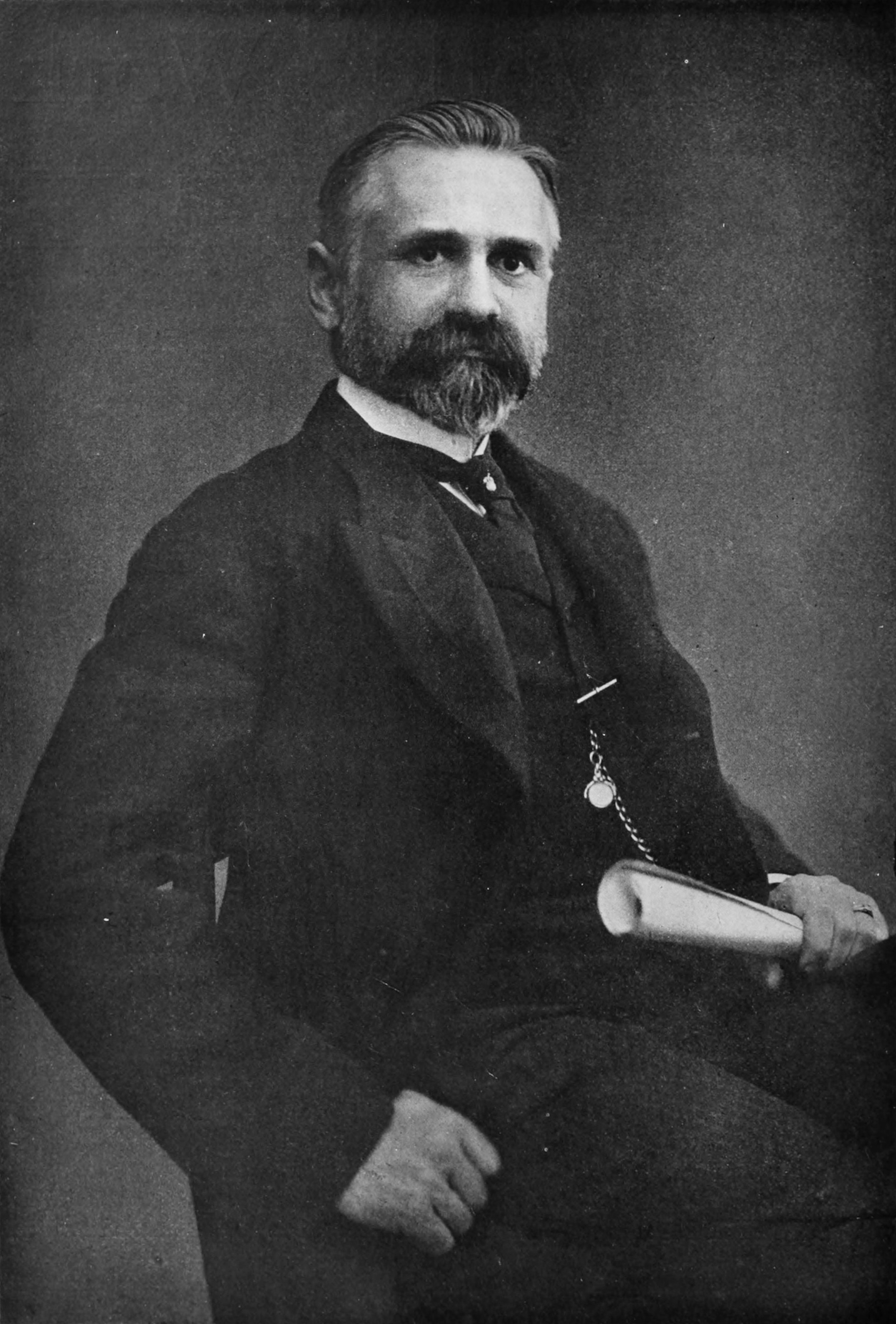
Picture of Frank Damrosch, by Davis & Sanford

Frank Heino Damrosch (June 22, 1859 – October 22, 1937) was a German-born American music conductor and educator. In 1905, Damrosch founded the New York Institute of Musical Art, a predecessor of the Juilliard School.

== Life and career ==
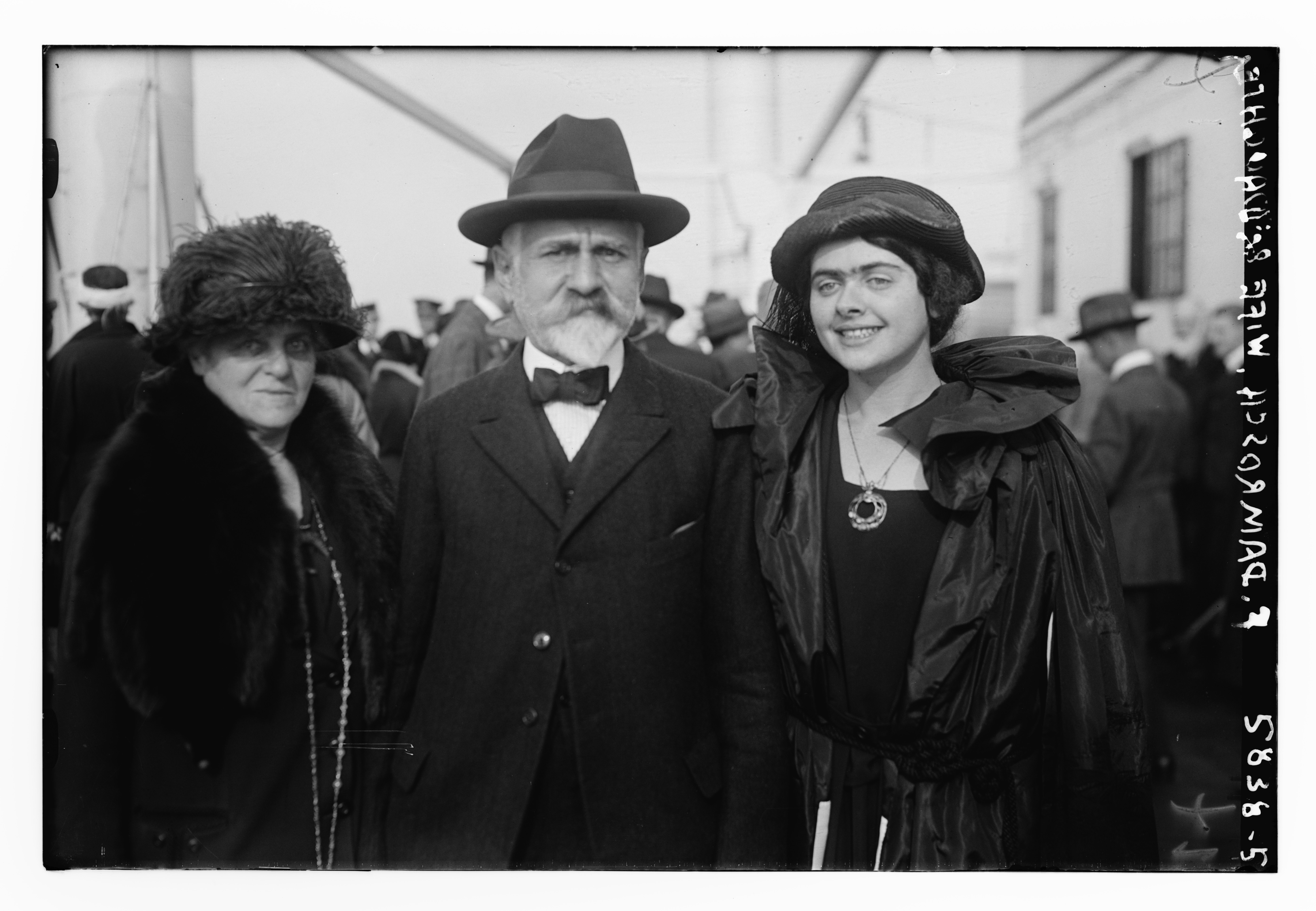
Damrosch with his wife and daughter, c.1920–1925

Damrosch was born on June 22, 1859, in Breslau, Silesia, the son of Helene von Heimburg, a former opera singer, and conductor Leopold Damrosch. He came to the United States with his father, brother Walter Damrosch, and sister Clara Mannes, in 1871. His parents were Lutheran, although his paternal grandfather was Jewish.

He had studied music in Germany under Dionys Pruckner. He studied in New York under Ferdinand von Inten. He also studied in Europe under Moritz Moszkowski. He had originally intended to adopt a business career, and to that end went to Denver, Colorado, but the musical impulse proved too strong, and, in 1884, he was an organist, conductor of the Denver Chorus Club, and supervisor of music in the public schools.

For some years he was chorus master at the Metropolitan Opera House in New York. He also conducted the Mendelssohn Glee Club from 1885 to 1887. In 1892, he organized the People's Singing Classes, and he was also instrumental in founding the Musical Art Society of New York.

In 1897, he became supervisor of music in the public schools in New York. In 1898 Damrosch succeeded his brother Walter as conductor of the Oratorio Society, which he directed until 1912. During his career, he and his sister Clara Damrosch also taught at the Veltin School for Girls in Manhattan. In 1901 he resigned for his position as president of the Manuscript Society of New York.

In 1905, he founded and became director of the New York Institute of Musical Art, with the hopes of reproducing the quality of instruction found in European conservatories. In 1926, the Institute of Musical Art merged with the Juilliard Graduate School to form what is today Juilliard School. Damrosch's pupils included William Howland, long-time head of the music department at the University of Michigan, and the prodigy pianist Hazel Scott.

Damrosch died in New York City on October 22, 1937, aged 78. Damrosch Park, part of New York's Lincoln Center for the Performing Arts, is named in honor of the Damrosch family.
