= New York Symphony Orchestra =

American symphony orchestra (1878–1928)

- Orchestra
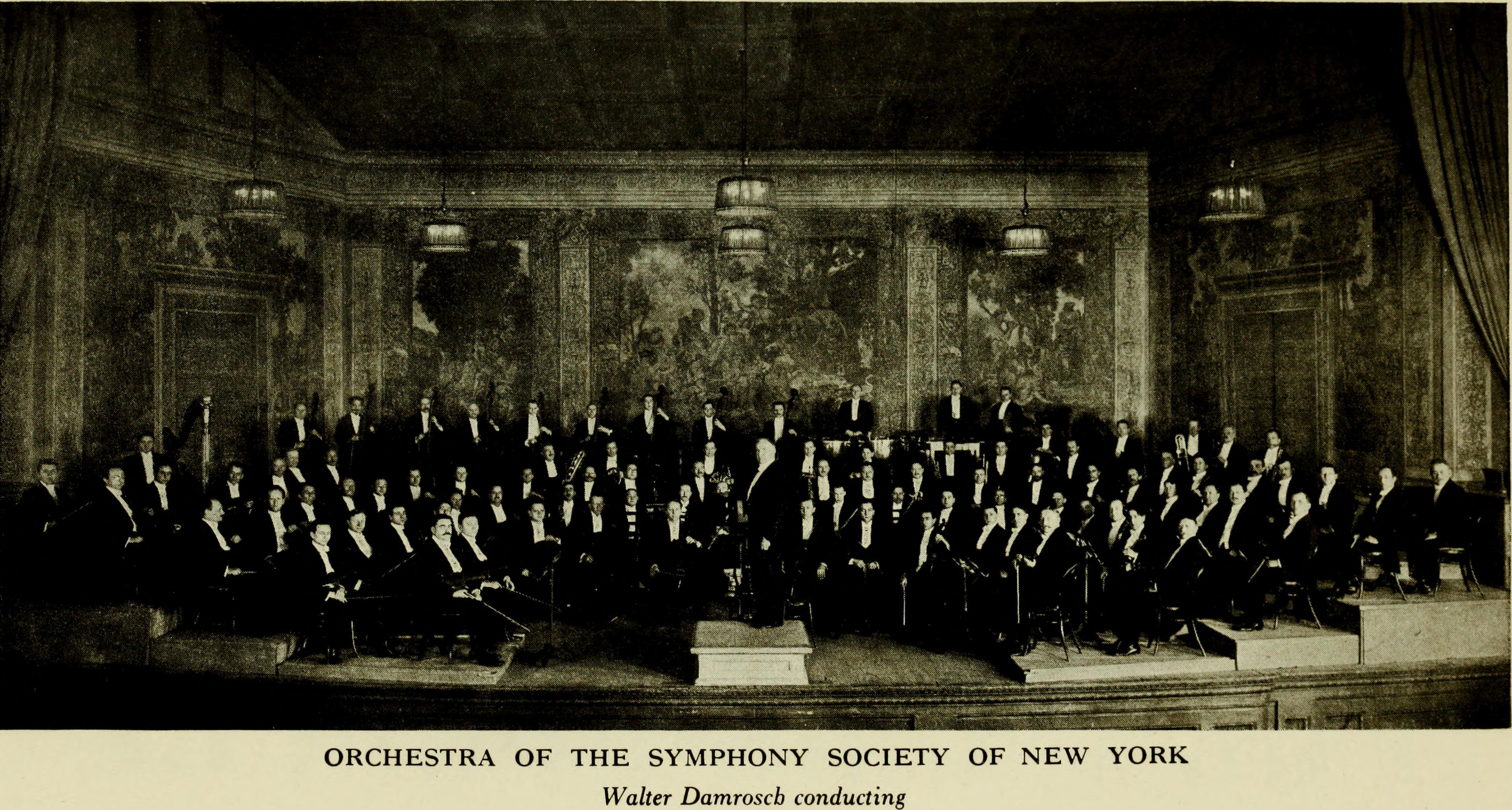
- Former name: New York Symphony Society
- Founded: 1878, by Leopold Damrosch
- Disbanded: 1928 (merged into the New York Philharmonic)
- Location: New York City, U.S.
- Music director: Leopold Damrosch (1878–1885); Walter Damrosch (1885–)

The New York Symphony Orchestra was founded as the New York Symphony Society in New York City by Leopold Damrosch in 1878. For many years, it was a rival to the older Philharmonic Symphony Society of New York. It was supported by Andrew Carnegie, who built Carnegie Hall (opened in 1891) expressly for the orchestra. The symphony was known for performing more colorful French and Russian works than the philharmonic, which excelled in German repertoire.

Upon his death in 1885, Leopold Damrosch was succeeded as musical director by his son Walter. In 1892, the orchestra toured to the Indianapolis May Festival.

In 1903, during a reorganization, it was renamed the New York Symphony Orchestra, and its first recordings were made that year as the "Damrosch Orchestra" for Columbia Records (of which only one was commercially issued, the prelude to Georges Bizet's Carmen). In 1920, it became the first American orchestra to tour Europe, and radio broadcasts of its concerts began in 1923. In 1928, the orchestra merged with the Philharmonic Society of New York to form the Philharmonic-Symphony Society of New York, later the New York Philharmonic.
