= Walter Damrosch =

German-American conductor and composer (1862–1950)

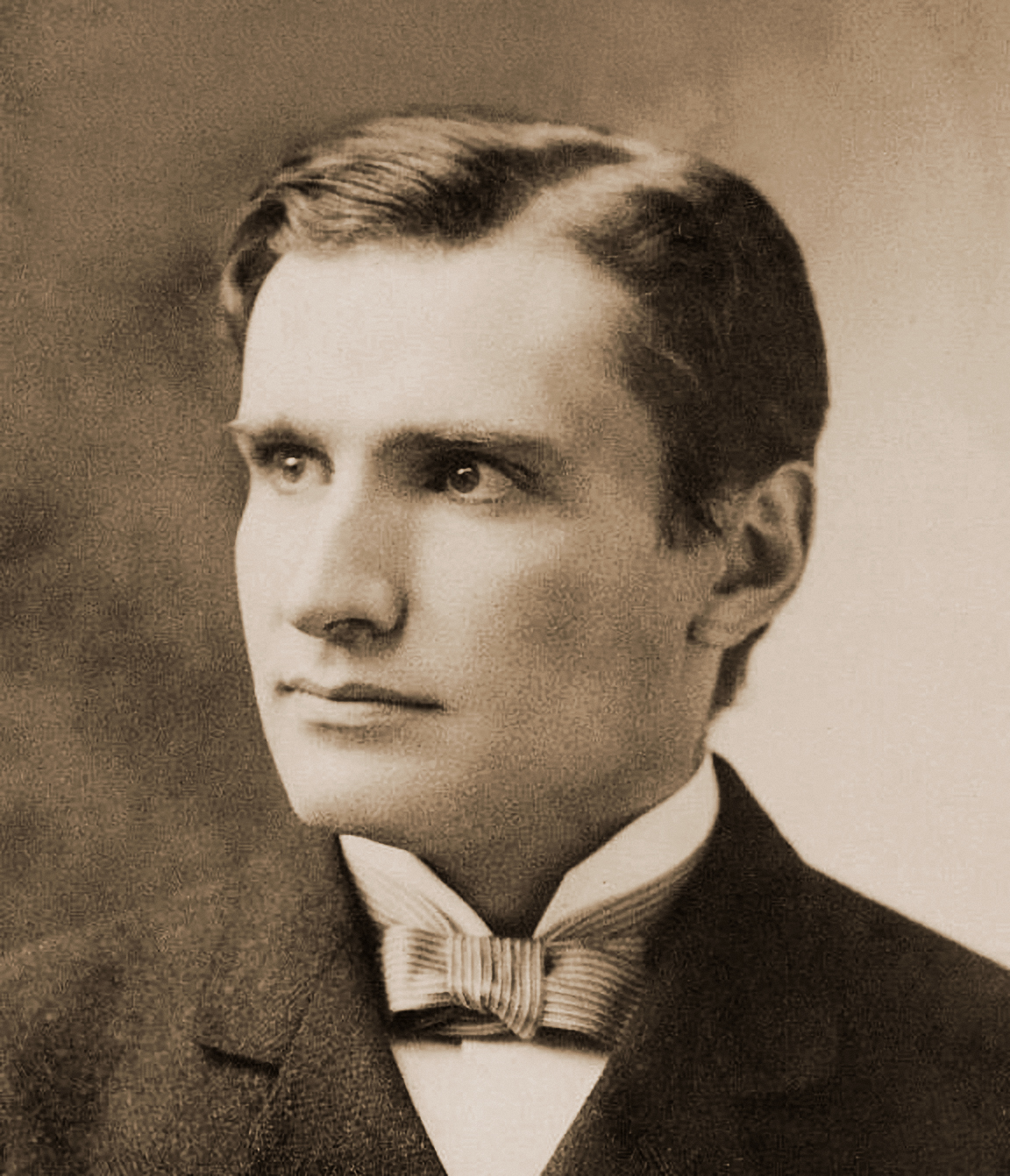
- Damrosch in 1889
- Born: January 30, 1862; Breslau, Silesia, Prussia
- Died: December 22, 1950 (aged 88); New York City, United States
- Burial place: Ledgelawn Cemetery
- Occupations: Conductor; composer
- Years active: 1881–1950
- Spouse: Margaret Blaine (m. 1890)
- Children: 4

Walter Johannes Damrosch (January 30, 1862 – December 22, 1950) was a Prussian and American conductor and composer. He was the director of the New York Symphony Orchestra and conducted the world premiere performances of various works, including Aaron Copland's Symphony for Organ and Orchestra, George Gershwin's Piano Concerto in F and An American in Paris, and Jean Sibelius' Tapiola. Damrosch was also instrumental in the founding of Carnegie Hall. He also conducted the first performance of Rachmaninoff's Piano Concerto No. 3 with the composer as soloist. His 1918 arrangement of "The Star-Spangled Banner", co-authored with John Philip Sousa, is the basis of most performances of the song today.

== Early life and education ==
Damrosch was born in Breslau, Silesia, to Helene von Heimburg, a former opera singer, and the conductor Leopold Damrosch. His brother Frank Damrosch became a music conductor and sister Clara Mannes a music teacher. His parents were Lutheran, although his paternal grandfather was Jewish.

He exhibited an interest in music at an early age and was instructed by his father in harmony, and also studied under Wilhelm Albert Rischbieter and Felix Draeseke at the Dresden Conservatory. He emigrated with his parents in 1871 to the United States.

== Career ==
During the great music festival given by his father in May 1881, he first acted as conductor in drilling several sections of the large chorus, one in New York City, and another in Newark, New Jersey. The latter, consisting chiefly of members of the Harmonic Society, elected him to be their conductor. During this time a series of concerts was given in which such works as Anton Rubinstein's Tower of Babel, Hector Berlioz's La damnation de Faust, and Giuseppe Verdi's Requiem were performed. He was then only 19 years of age, but showed marked ability in drilling large groups.

In 1884, when his father initiated a run of all-German opera at the Metropolitan Opera in New York, Walter was made an assistant conductor. After his father's death in 1885, he held the same post under Anton Seidl and also became conductor of the Oratorio and Symphony Societies in New York.

On May 17, 1890, he married Margaret Blaine, the daughter of American politician and presidential candidate James G. Blaine. They had four daughters: Alice, Margaret (known as Gretchen), Leopoldine, and Anita.

Damrosch was best known in his day as a conductor of the music of Richard Wagner, and in 1894 he founded the Damrosch Opera Company for producing Wagner's works. He was also a pioneer in the performance of music on the radio, and as such became one of the chief popularizers of classical music in the United States.

In June 1891, Damrosch searched for a first violinist for his permanent New York Symphony Orchestra, choosing violinist and composer Julius Conus, who was touring in Berlin.

In April 1905 Damrosch went to France and Belgium looking for musicians to improve the New York Symphony Orchestra, which he directed from 1885 to 1928. He engaged five musicians: oboist Marcel Tabuteau, flutist Georges Barrère, bassoonist Auguste Mesnard, clarinetist Leon Leroy from France, and trumpeter Adolphe Dubois from Belgium. Damrosch was fined by the musician's union for not advertising for musicians from New York, but the immigrating musicians were allowed to stay.

Damrosch conducted solo harpist Vincent Fanelli from 1908 to 1911. At the request of General Pershing he reorganized the bands of the American Expeditionary Force in 1918.

One of his principal achievements was the successful performance of Parsifal, perhaps the most difficult of Wagner's operas, for the first time in the United States, in March 1886, by the Oratorio and Symphony societies. During his visit to Europe in the summer of 1886, he was invited by the Deutsche Tonkünstler-Verein, of which Franz Liszt was president, to conduct some of his father Leopold's compositions at Sondershausen, Thuringia. Carl Goldmark's opera Merlin was produced for the first time in the United States under Damrosch's direction, at the Metropolitan Opera House, 3 January 1887.

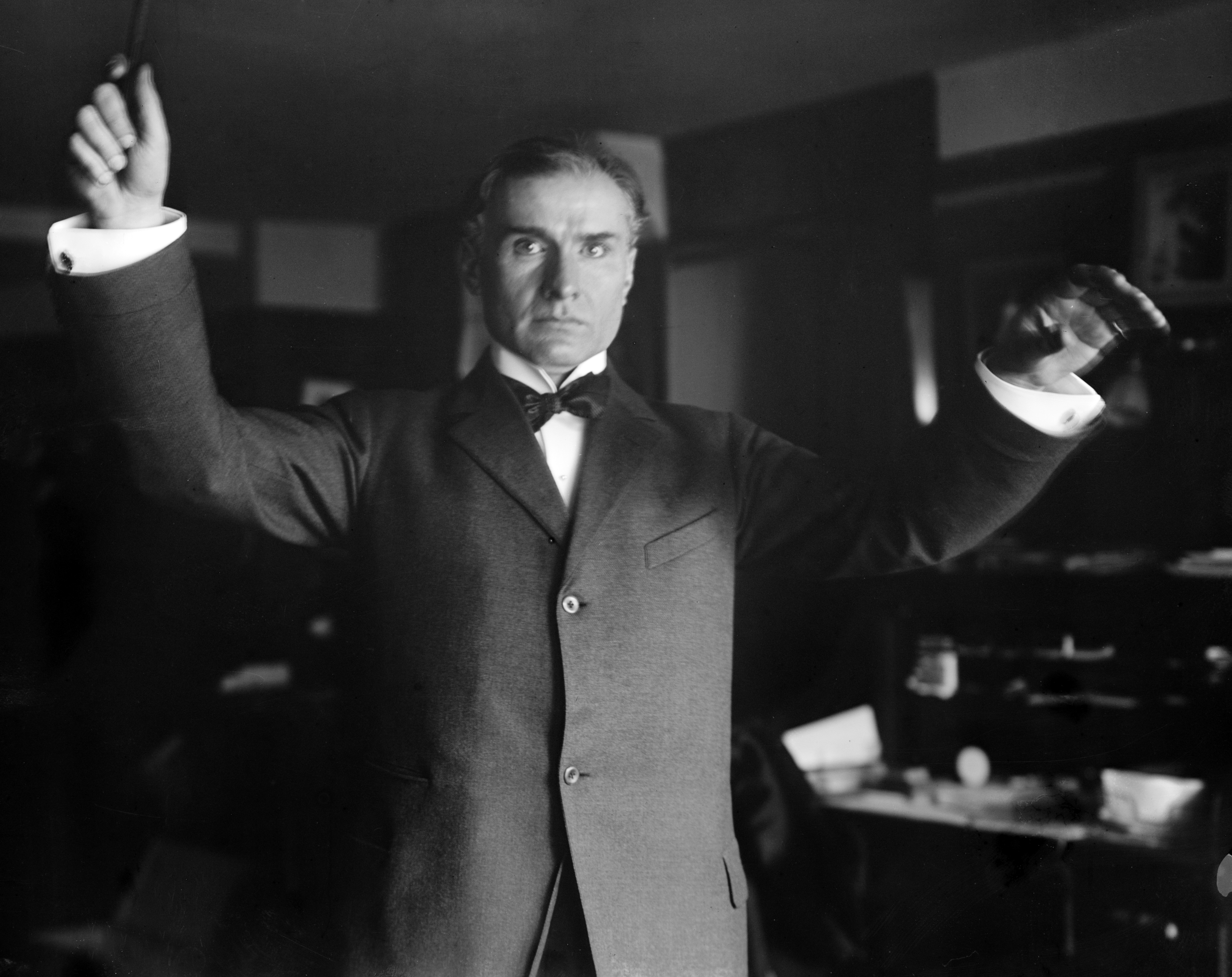
Walter Damrosch in 1908

Although now remembered almost exclusively as a conductor, before his radio broadcasts Damrosch was equally well known as a composer and teacher. His students included Esther Zweig. He composed operas based on stories such as The Scarlet Letter (1896), Cyrano (1913), and The Man Without a Country (1937). Those operas are seldom performed now. He also wrote music for performances of Euripides's Medea and Iphigenia in Tauris, and Sophocles's Electra, and songs such as the intensely dramatic Danny Deever.

Damrosch was the National Broadcasting Company's music director under David Sarnoff, and from 1928 to 1942, he hosted the network's Music Appreciation Hour, a popular series of radio lectures on classic music aimed at students. (The show was broadcast during school hours, and teachers were provided with textbooks and worksheets by the network.) According to former New York Times critic Harold C. Schonberg in his collection Facing the Music, Damrosch was notorious for making up silly lyrics for the music he discussed in order to "help" young people appreciate it, rather than letting the music speak for itself. An example: for the first movement of Franz Schubert's Unfinished Symphony, the lyric went

This is the symphony,
That Schubert wrote and never finished.

Damrosch and John Philip Sousa's 1918 arrangement of the "The Star-Spangled Banner" being performed by the United States Military Academy Band in 2000.

Although Damrosch took an interest in music technologies, he recorded sporadically. His first recording, the prelude to Bizet's Carmen, appeared in 1903 (for Columbia Records, with a contingent of the New York Symphony credited as the "Damrosch Orchestra"). He recorded very few extended works, and those were near the end of his most active time as a conductor; the only symphony he recorded was Brahms's Second followed by Maurice Ravel's Ma mère l'Oye suite with the New York Symphony for Columbia shortly before the orchestra merged with the New York Philharmonic. Together with John Philip Sousa in 1918, he co-authored an arrangement of "The Star-Spangled Banner" that became popular and remains the basis of most performances of the song today. He also recorded the complete ballet music from the opera Henry VIII by Camille Saint-Saëns, three "Airs de Ballet" from Iphigénie en Aulide by Christoph Willibald Gluck in an arrangement by François-Auguste Gevaert, and shorter works by Johann Sebastian Bach, Gabriel Fauré, and Moritz Moszkowski with the National Broadcasting Company's predecessor of the NBC Symphony Orchestra under the name of the "National Symphony Orchestra" (not to be confused with the later National Symphony Orchestra of Washington, D.C.) for RCA Victor in May and September 1930.

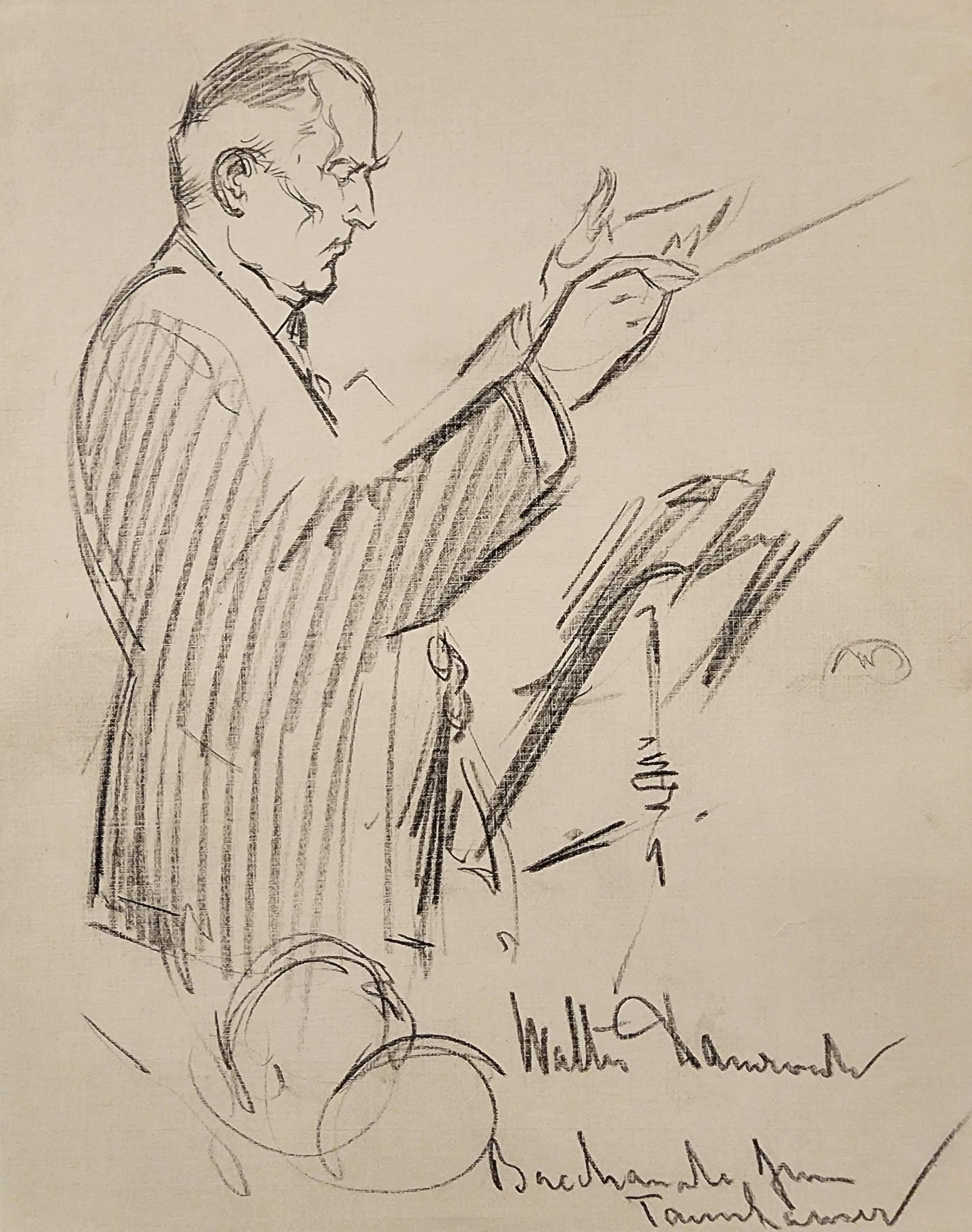
Signed drawings of Walter Damrosch by Manuel Rosenberg for the Cincinnati Post 1926

Walter Damrosch died in New York City in 1950. He is interred in Ledgelawn Cemetery in Bar Harbor, Maine.

Damrosch was elected to the American Philosophical Society in 1939. Damrosch Park at Lincoln Center is named in honor of his family. The public school P186X Walter J. Damrosch School in the Bronx is named after him. A collection of photographs and other items compiled by his daughter Anita is among the Special Collections of the Lovejoy Library at Southern Illinois University Edwardsville.

== Works ==
- The Scarlet Letter (1894) – opera in three acts based on Hawthorne's romance of that name; published by Breitkopf and Härtel
- The Manila Te Deum - for solos, chorus, and orchestra, written in honor of Dewey's victory at Manila Bay; published by the John Church Company
- Three songs, published by the John Church Company
- Sonata for violin and piano
- At Fox Meadow, published by the John Church Company
- Cyrano (1913) – a grand opera in four acts, libretto by W. J. Henderson, adapted from Rostand's play; published by G. Schirmer
- The Dove of Peace (1912) – comic opera/musical - composer and co-librettist with Wallace Irwin; published by G. Schirmer
- "The Star-Spangled Banner" (1918), arrangement co-authored with John Philip Sousa
- Electra (1918 revival) – play – incidental music composer
- My Musical Life (1922), Autobiography
- The Man Without a Country (1937)
- The Opera Cloak (1943), opera in one act
