= Aaron Copland School of Music =

Music department at Queens College, New York

Coordinates: 40°44′17″N 73°49′2″W

The Aaron Copland School of Music is one of the oldest departments at Queens College at the City University of New York, founded when the College opened in 1937.

The department's curriculum was originally established by Edwin Stringham, and a later emphasis on the analytical system of Heinrich Schenker was initiated by Saul Novack.

Some of the students who enrolled in early classes of the college later became faculty members of the department. This included Sol Berkowitz, Gabriel Fontrier, Leo Kraft. Other distinguished faculty from the early years included John Castellini, who founded the Choral Society; Boris Schwarz, a refugee from his native Russia in 1917 and later from Nazi Germany in the 1930s; Saul Novack, who later became Dean of the Division of Arts and Humanities; and Barry Brook, who with Novack established the doctoral program in music at the Graduate Center of CUNY. Joseph Machlis, developed the teaching of music appreciation to a high art, and wrote the most successful series of music appreciation textbooks in history. (Machlis's Enjoyment of Music: An Introduction to Perceptive Listening has been used by more than 3.5 million students and is in its tenth edition.) Later faculty included Felix Salzer, a refugee from Austria who was a student of the theorist Heinrich Schenker and became the leading exponent of his ideas to generations of American students and scholars; and the composers Hugo Weisgall and George Perle.

== Notable alumni ==
- Arturo O'Farrill
- Marco Oppedisano
- Conrad Herwig
- JoAnn Falletta
- Erika Sunnegårdh
- George Tsontakis
- Tito Muñoz
- Edward W. Hardy
- Vasili Byros

== Notable faculty ==
- Sol Berkowitz
- Hugo Weisgall
- Jimmy Heath
- George Perle
- Thea Musgrave
  (emeritus)
- Leo Kraft
- Karol Rathaus
- Marcy Rosen
- David Jolley
- Carl Schachter
- Stephanie Chase
- Roland Hanna
- Maurice Peress
- Bruce Saylor
- Edward Smaldone
  (Director, 2002–2016)
