= Sol Berkowitz =

American composer and music educator

Sol Berkowitz (27 April 1922 – 29 July 2006) was an American composer and music educator.

== Life ==
Sol Berkowitz was born in Warren, Ohio, and lived in New York from 1925. He received music degrees from Queens College (CUNY) in 1942 and Columbia University in 1946. He studied piano with Abby Whiteside and composition with Karol Rathaus, Harold Morris and Otto Luening.

Berkowitz was a professor at Aaron Copland School of Music at Queens College from 1946 until 1999, with a brief hiatus (1961–1967) to pursue a career as a theatre, film and television composer. Known as a teacher of music theory, orchestration, ear training and musicianship, Berkowitz wrote the music textbooks A New Approach to Sight Singing and Improvisation through Keyboard Harmony.

Berkowitz composed musicals, ballets, orchestral works, chamber music, and hundreds of choral works and songs. His musical score Nowhere to Go But Up! was produced on Broadway in 1962.

Among Berkowitz's students are jazz pianist Mal Waldron, jazz guitarist Billy Bauer, musicologist Lewis Lockwood and composer Bright Sheng.

== Selected works ==
Stage

- Fat Tuesday, Opera (1956)
- Miss Emily Adam, Off-Broadway Musical (1960)
- Nowhere to Go But Up!, Broadway Musical (1962); book and lyrics by James Lipton

Orchestral

- Diversion (1972)
- Dance Suite for string orchestra

Band

- Game of Dance (1956)
- Paradigm, Jazz Adventure in Sonata Allegro Form (1969)
- Suite of Miniatures (1977)

Chamber music

- 10 Duets for Treble Instruments (1971)
- Introduction and Scherzo: Blues and Dance for viola and piano (1974)
- Suite for Winds for flute, oboe, clarinet, bassoon and horn (1975)
- Dialogue for cello and piano (1980)

Piano

- Sonata (1941)
- Duo concertante for 2 pianos (1942)
- 9 Folk Song Preludes (1972)
- 12 Easy Blues (1974)
- 4 Blues for Lefty (1976)
- Five for Four for piano 4-hands (1977)
- Jazzettes, 17 Pieces in Classic Jazz Style (1988)

Choral

- Didn't My Lord Deliver Daniel for mixed chorus a cappella (1955)
- Without Words, Suite for mixed chorus a cappella (1963)
- The Mad Lover, 5 Sad and Humorous Songs in Jazz Rock for mixed chorus a cappella (1970); words by Alexander Brome
- Add a Riff for mixed chorus with optional accompaniment (1974)
- Two Letters from Lincoln for mixed chorus and piano (1974)
- Two Letters from Jefferson for mixed chorus and piano (1975)
- Antidisestablishmentarianism for mixed chorus a cappella (1975)
- Some Guides to Dining according to George Washington for mixed chorus and piano (1978)
- Don't Ask Me and I Had a Little Pup, 2 Traditional American Rhymes for two-part chorus of young voices and piano (1979)
- Father William for two-part chorus of young voices with piano accompaniment (1979); words by Lewis Carroll
- Daniel, Spiritual Paraphrase for mixed chorus and piano (1981)
- The Bop Fugue for two-part chorus with keyboard accompaniment (1981)
- The Cuckoo Bird for two-part chorus and piano (1982)
- Passacaglia in Blue, Theme and 14 Variations for mixed chorus and piano (1982)
- Comparisons for two-part chorus and piano (1982)
- Me and Animals for two-part chorus and piano (1982)
- Swingin' in Five for two-part mixed chorus and piano (1984)
- Swingin' with Solfège for two-part mixed chorus and piano (1984)
- Latin Rock for three-part chorus and piano (1985)

Educational

- A New Approach to Sight Singing (W. W. Norton & Company, 1960)
- Improvisation through Keyboard Harmony (Prentice Hall, 1975)
