= Erika Sunnegårdh =

Swedish operatic soprano

- Born: March 11, 1966 (age 60); Danderyd, Stockholm County, Sweden
- Education: Manhattan School of Music; Aaron Copland School of Music
- Occupation: Operatic soprano

Erika Sunnegårdh (born March 11, 1966) is a Swedish operatic soprano. She lived for many years in New York, where she made a much reported debut at the Metropolitan Opera in 2006.

== Early life and education ==
Erika Sunnegårdh was born in Danderyd in Stockholm County. Her parents were both prominent voice teachers: her father, Arne Sunnegårdh, worked with Birgit Nilsson and Jussi Björling and was chorus master at the Royal Swedish Opera and a professor at the Stockholm Conservatory, and her mother, Margareta Backer-Sunnegårdh, was a coloratura soprano. Her half-brother Thomas Sunnegårdh is a tenor.

As a student in Sweden Erika Sunnegårdh attended Adolf Fredrik's Music School in Stockholm. She lived in the U.S. for 23 years starting in 1985; she moved there at 19 to dance, graduated from the Manhattan School of Music in 1992 and earned an M.A. from the Aaron Copland School of Music at Queens College, and worked as a waitress, caterer and tour guide in New York, singing at recitals and as a cantor.

== Career ==
Sunnegårdh made her operatic debut in September 2004 at the Malmö Opera in Puccini's Turandot. She subsequently sang Turandot again in Sweden, gave orchestral concerts there, and performed the title role in Beethoven's Fidelio with the Florentine Opera in Milwaukee.

Having already signed a contract with the Metropolitan Opera in May 2004, she made her debut there at short notice at a Saturday matinee on April 1, 2006, singing the title role in Fidelio as a substitute for Karita Mattila. The performance was broadcast in the live Metropolitan Opera radio broadcasts series, and she appeared on NBC's Today show the following morning. She was also understudy for Elsa in Wagner's Lohengrin that season and was engaged to sing in the Ring cycle that season, in Mozart's The Magic Flute the following season, and then in spring 2007 as joint lead in Turandot and again in Fidelio. In the event she first sang Turandot there a few weeks in advance of her first scheduled appearance, stepping in for Andrea Gruber.

In Europe, Sunnegårdh sang Turandot at the Deutsche Oper in Berlin in January–March 2012, and has performed several times in the title roles in Puccini's Tosca, including as a replacement at the Royal Swedish Opera, and R. Strauss' Salome, as Lady Macbeth, including at Glyndebourne, and at the Malmö Opera in the title role in Janáček's Jenůfa. She made her singing debut in her hometown of Stockholm as Turandot at the Royal Swedish Opera in autumn 2013. She has also continued to give concert recitals, including of contemporary music such as Carl Unander-Scharin's The world as I see it, to texts by Albert Einstein, with the percussion ensemble Kroumata.

In summer 2006 Sunnegårdh was a host on the P1 Sommar program.

In the fall of 2013 Sunnegårdh crowdfunded her debut solo album with the Malmö Symphony Orchestra directed by Will Humburg.

=== Critical assessments ===
Sunnegårdh has a powerful voice that she has described as "like a wild horse"; coaching from her mother was important in enabling her to gain control of it. Her first appearance at the Metropolitan Opera was greeted warmly by the audience and most of the press, although writing for The New York Times, Anthony Tommasini found her hesitant, especially in Act One. The following year, Bernard Holland wrote of her first scheduled appearance in Turandot that she "should be pleased with herself" and that "[s]he is the rare Turandot who both sings like an object of hopeless desire and looks like one".

== Personal life ==
Since 2011 Sunnegårdh has lived in Vienna, also the home of her voice teacher Glenys Linos, a retired Greek mezzo-soprano. In 1999 she founded In time with Music, a community outreach program benefiting school children in Queens, New York.

== Discography ==
- Mahler, Symphony 8, conducted by Riccardo Chailly. DVD. 2011, Accentus Music.
- Who might sing in all the muted woods? Erika Sunnegårdh sings songs created by Joel Mandelbaum. 2002. Capstone.
- Title role in Leoš Janáček's Jenufa. Malmö Opera. Dir. Marko Ivanovic. DVD. Arthaus 101665.
- Helmwige in Richard Wagner's Die Walküre. Festival d'Aix-en-Provence. Grand Théâtre de Provence. conducted by Simon Rattle. 2007. DVD. BelAirClassiques BAC034.
- Excerpts from Fidelio, Tannhäuser, Der fliegende Holländer and Salome; Strauss’s Four Last Songs, with the Malmö Symphony Orchestra conducted by Will Humburg.

== Sources ==
- Ulrika Junker Miranda (ed.). Bonniers uppslagsbok. Stockholm: Bonniers, 2007. ISBN 978-91-0-011462-6. p. 965. (in Swedish)
