= Smaldone =

Smaldone is a surname. Notable people with the surname include:

- Filippo Smaldone (1848–1923), Italian priest
- Hugo Smaldone, Argentine footballer
- Micah Smaldone, American musician
- Valerie Smaldone, American media personality
- William Smaldone, American historian
- Smaldone crime family
- Kristine Smaldone, American photographer
- Edward Smaldone, American composer
