= Leo Kraft =

American composer (1922–2014)

Leo Abraham Kraft (July 24, 1922 – April 30, 2014) was an American composer, author, and educator.

Kraft was born in Brooklyn, New York. He held degrees from Queens College (CUNY) and Princeton University. He studied composition with Karol Rathaus, Randall Thompson, and Nadia Boulanger. His music has been recorded on several labels, including Centaur Records, Albany Records, and Arizona University Recordings.

In addition, Kraft taught at Queens College for many years.
