= Paul Klapper =

Romanian-American educator (1885–1952)

Paul Klapper (July 17, 1885 – March 25, 1952) was a Romanian-born Jewish-American educator from New York.

== Life ==
Klapper was born on July 17, 1885, in Iași, Romania, the son of Louis Klapper and Rachel Halpern.

Klapper immigrated to America in 1892. He graduated from the City College of New York with an A.B. in 1904 and New York University with a Master of Arts in 1907 and a Doctor of Philosophy in 1909. He also attended the University of Wisconsin–Madison in 1908. He then began teaching at the College of the City of New York School of Education, working as a tutor from 1907 to 1909, an instructor from 1909 to 1914, an assistant professor from 1914 to 1915, an associate professor from 1915 to 1921, and a professor from 1921 to 1922 and from 1931 to 1937. He was also director of the college's summer session from 1917 to 1922. In 1922, he was appointed dean of the school of education. He served as dean until 1937.

In 1937, Klapper became the first president of Queens College. The college developed rapidly under his leadership, and the library was named after him. He retired as president in 1948 and became dean of teacher education of the Board of Higher Education of New York. He was a firm opponent of formal curricula and traditional modes of disciple, and was concerned with raising teachers' economic status and giving them the dignity he felt the profession deserved. His education philosophy and pedagogy theories influenced educational practices in schools across the country. He wrote several publications regarding education.

Klapper was a consultant to the Ford Fund for the Advancement of Education, a visiting professor of the University of Chicago from 1949 to 1950, a trustee of the State University of New York and Brandeis University, a fellow of the American Association for the Advancement of Science, and a member of the National Education Association, the New York Council of the State Commission Against Discrimination, the New York State Commission on Need for State University, Phi Beta Kappa, and Kappa Delta Pi. In 1911, he married Flora Eydenberg. They had one child, Joseph Thomas.

Klapper died at his home in Flushing, Queens from a heart attack on March 25, 1952.
