= Edward Smaldone =

American composer

- Born: November 19, 1956 (age 69)
- Origin: Rockville Centre, New York, USA
- Genres: Contemporary classical
- Occupations: Composer, professor
- Years active: 1978–present
- Website: edwardsmaldone.com

Edward Smaldone (born in 1956) is an American classical music composer based in New York City. From 2002 to 2016 he was Director of the Aaron Copland School of Music at Queens College in New York City. He continued as a Professor of Music Theory and Composition until his retirement in 2024 and is now Professor of Music Emeritus.

His music has been described as blending "influences from the worlds of twelve tone music, jazz, and extramusical realms like architecture and poetry" with "distinctive textures [that] include unusual combinations of instruments, odd beats, counterpoint and rich harmonics." The author of a 2025 article about Smaldone's work, published in Fanfare: The Magazine for Serious Record Collectors, wrote that his "compositions draw inspiration from various cultural and historical elements, such as African American folklore and Persian poetry." The article praised "Smaldone's craftsmanship and eclectic style, noting his influences from jazz and his ability to blend modernist language with traditional harmonies."

Recordings of his music have been released on labels including New World Records, New Focus Recordings, Naxos, Ablaze Recordings, CRI, Sera, New Music Manitoba, and Capstone. All told Smaldone has 67 works on file with ASCAP.

== Early life and education ==
Smaldone was born in the Long Island town of Rockville Centre, New York, and grew up in Wantagh, also on Long Island.

He was playing guitar in a rock band in high school when, hearing a recording of Mussorgsky's "On Bald Mountain," he was inspired to study classical music. In his final year at Holy Trinity High School he began studying piano and music theory, then attended Queens College where he earned a BA in 1978 and a master's degree in 1980. He then earned a PhD in composition from the Graduate Center of the City University of New York. His 1986 doctoral thesis was on the subject of the music of Arnold Schoenberg and included a composition, his String Quartet No. 2, which was recorded on Capstone.

Smaldone studied composition with, among others, George Perle, about whom he later co-wrote an academic paper, and Hugo Weisgall. He wrote his first piece of contemporary classical music, a string quartet, in 1978.

He also studied with Ralph Shapey, Henry Weinberg, Leslie Bassett and others.

== Academic and artistic career ==
Early on, Smaldone held teaching positions on the faculty of Hofstra University, The New School, and SUNY Purchase, where he was a Visiting Assistant Professor from 1986 to 1990. In 1989 he returned to his alma mater, Queens College, where he joined the full-time faculty as an Assistant Professor. He went on to spend the bulk of his academic career there, having been promoted to Full Professor in 2005. He is a board member of the League of Composers/ISCM and was president of the organization from 1995 to 1997.

=== 1980s to 1990s ===
For several years beginning in 1985, Smaldone directed a Queens Symphony Orchestra series called "Sounds from the Left Bank" at PS1 (now MoMA PS1) presenting contemporary chamber works by various composers including Smaldone himself, such as his "Icons" for clarinet, oboe, and piano, performed in May 1988. In November 1989 the Denver Chamber Orchestra conducted by JoAnn Falletta premiered his "Dialogue." By 1993 The New York Times reported that he had written about 25 pieces. His work had received performances by ensembles including the Memphis Symphony and the Contemporary Chamber Players of Chicago.

Pianist Michael Boriskin commissioned and performed Smaldone's Transformational Etudes in 1990. The Sacramento Hornet described the pieces as "a wash of glorious piano triumphs." The same year, Smaldone's work was performed at the Charles Ives Center for American Music.

In 1993 Boriskin and the Queens Symphony Orchestra premiered Smaldone's "Rhapsody for Piano and Orchestra," which the Queens Symphony had commissioned for its 40th anniversary. It was subsequently recorded for the CRI label by the Munich Radio Orchestra conducted by Fagen with Boriskin as soloist.

From 1982 to 1988 Smaldone was Associate Director of the Center for Preparatory Studies in Music (now the Eisman Center) at Queens College.

=== 2000s to 2010s ===
Smaldone was Director of the Aaron Copland School of Music at Queens College, CUNY, from 2002 to 2016.

In 2009 Perry Goldstein and the Stony Brook Premieres Series commissioned Smaldone to compose a work for the series. The result was "Cantare di Amore" for soprano, flute and harp, in which Smaldone re-cast poetry from Monteverdi's madrigals. Soprano Samantha Guevrekian and the Stony Brook Chamber Players premiered the work at Merkin Hall, New York City later that year. New Focus Recordings released a recording of the work in 2020.

In 2013 Smaldone's "The Beauty of Innuendo" was performed in Tokyo by Oratorio Sinfonica Japan conducted by Daijiro Ukon, and Jingye Zhang performed his "Solo Sonata for Violin" at the Beijing Central Conservatory. The following year Zhang and pianist Tong Chen performed Smaldone's "Suite for Violin and Piano" at the Beijing Modern Music Festival.

In 2015 an invitation from the New York Virtuoso Singers led to performances and a recording of "L'Infinito" for SATB choir. Naxos released a recording of the work in 2017.

In 2016 the Classical Recording Foundation named Smaldone Composer of the Year. A ceremony marking the honor was held at National Sawdust in Brooklyn.

In 2018 Smaldone conducted a New York City performance of his "Beauty Within Arm's Reach" by faculty and students from the Aaron Copland School of Music and the Royal Danish Academy of Music in New York City. In 2019 pianist Kristina Socanski performed his "Three Scenes from The Heartland" at the Royal Danish Academy of Music in Copenhagen and released a recording on the Sera label. In June 2021, Søren-Filip Hansen and Den Kongelige Livgarde Musikkorps, the Queen of Denmark's wind and brass orchestra, performed his clarinet concerto ("Murmurations") in Copenhagen as part of the KLANG! New Music Festival.

Also in 2018, the Perugia Saxophone Quintet performed Smaldone's "Stand!" at the World Saxophone Congress in Zagreb.

=== 2020s, dance collaborations, and retirement ===
Smaldone created a number of works for dance. The most prominent is his arrangements of music by or attributed to Giovanni Battista Pergolesi. The arrangements were created at the request of Mikhail Baryshnikov's White Oak Dance Project, which performed it many times, including at Lincoln Center and with Baryshnikov as soloist. It was also included in the 2021 dance performances honoring Twyla Tharp and featuring The Knights at City Center in New York City. He has also worked with Jacob's Pillow, the Hartford Ballet, and dancer-choreographer Yin Mei.

In 2022 his "Duke Re-dux," a reworking of the "Duke" movement of his piece Duke/Monk (released on New Focus Recordings in 2020), was premiered by No Exit Ensemble at Carnegie Hall's Weill Recital Hall. The same year, the Idaho State-Civic Symphony with Nell Flanders conducting premiered a new orchestration of Smaldone's concerto for solo clarinet and orchestra, "Murmurations." In 2023 the Orchestra of the League of Composers and pianist Niklas Sivelöv premiered Prendendo Fuoco (Catching Fire), a piano concerto by Smaldone, at Miller Theatre at Columbia University with the composer conducting. "Duke Re-dux" was performed at the 2022 Bowdoin Music Festival in Brunswick, Maine. Sivelov and the Royal Scottish National Orchestra with Mikel Toms conducting subsequently recorded Prendendo Fuoco in Glasgow and it was released on New Focus Recordings in 2024.

In 2024 Smaldone retired from the Aaron Copland School of Music. Several concert events featuring his compositions were staged to mark the occasion, including violinist Chloë Dickens and her ensemble Alegría debuting Smaldone's "While the Sand Still Runs."

== Publications ==
Smaldone is co-author of the fifth, sixth and seventh editions of the book A New Approach to Sight-Singing.

His published scholarly work includes articles on Japanese traditional music and composer Tōru Takemitsu and on George Perle.

In the 1980s Smaldone wrote articles on contemporary music in the magazine Attenzione.

Smaldone's music is published by the American Composers Editions, an imprint of the American Composers Alliance.

== Awards and recognition ==
- 1985, 1987: Yaddo Fellowships
- 1993: Goddard Lieberson Fellowship from the American Academy of Arts and Letters
- 1994: Macdowell Fellowship
- 1999: Associate Composer, Atlantic Center for the Arts
- 2016: John Castellini Award
- 2016: Named "Composer of the Year" by the Classical Recording Foundation
- 2017: Distinguished Alumnus Award from the City University of New York Graduate Center
- 2020: Global Music Awards, Silver Medal for "Once and Again"

== Personal life ==
Smaldone lives in Manhasset, New York. He and his wife Karen have three grown children, Laura, Gregory, and Julia.

== Select discography ==
What No One Else Sees...	2024	Released: December 6, 2024; Label: New Focus Recordings; Format: CD, Digital
Sinfonia Series Vol. 2: "Life Imagined, Life Engaged"	2021	Released: January 2021; Label: Ablaze Records; Format: CD, Digital
Once and Again	2020	Released: August 14, 2020; New Focus Recordings; Format: CD, Digital
Double Portrait (music of Edward Smaldone and Douglas Knehans)	2020	Released: July 2020; Label: CRI; Format: CD, Digital
Three Scenes from "The Heartland"	2020	Released: 2020; Label: A New World, Sheva Collection/CRI; Format: CD, Digital
Songs of Praise and Peace: "L'Infinito"	2017	Released: December 2017; Label: Naxos; Format: CD, Digital
"Beauty Within Arm's Reach"	2017	Released: January 2019; Label: Independent release; Format: Stream
Orchestral Masters Vol. 2: "The Beauty of Innuendo"	2014	Released: 2014; Ablaze Records; Format: CD
Rituals: Sacred and Profane	2012	Released: April 2012; Label: Naxos; Format: CD
Diverse Light (Meridian String Quartet): "String Quartet No. 2"	2001	Released: June 2001; Capstone Records; Format: CD, digital
Three Scenes from "The Heartland" (Michael Boriskin, piano; Munich Radio Orchestra; Arthur Fagen, conductor; Speculum Musicae): "Rhapsody for Piano and Orchestra," "Trio: Dance & Nocturne," Three Scenes from "The Heartland", Solo Sonata for Violin, "Two Sides of the Same Coin"	2000	Released: 2000; CRI; Format: CD, digital
Works by Leonard Bernstein, Richard Danielpour, Lowell Liebermann, Edward Smaldone (Michael Boriskin): "Transformational Etudes"	1992	Released: January 1, 1992; New World Records; Format: CD
