= Saul Novack =

American academic (1918–1998)

Saul Novack (1918 in Manhattan – March 4, 1998) was the dean of arts and humanities at Queens College, City University of New York, from 1978 to 1982 and a professor emeritus at the college's Aaron Copland School of Music.,

Novack graduated from City College in 1939 and Columbia University in 1941.

His daughter Carol Novack is a poet and co-founder of the MadHat Press.
