= Edwin Stringham =

American composer (1890–1974)

Edwin John Stringham (11 July 1890 in Kenosha, Wisconsin – 30 June 1974 in Chapel Hill, North Carolina) was an American composer.

== Life ==
Stringham was a native of Kenosha, Wisconsin. He earned a bachelor's degree in music from Northwestern University, a doctorate in music from the University of Denver, and a doctorate in teaching from the University of Cincinnati. He also studied at the Royal Academy of Rome, the Italian Academy, and the Ludwig-Maximilians-Universität München. He died in Chapel Hill, North Carolina.

== Career ==
Stringham spent much time in Colorado before moving to New York City, where he served on the faculty of Teachers College at Columbia University. Until 1947, he was the director of music instruction at the U. S. Army American University in Biarritz, France. Most of his output was orchestral, and would frequently spice his works with elements of jazz. Among the orchestras to play his work was the Chicago Symphony Orchestra.

== Politics ==
In the late 1940s, Stringham declared that the Communist Party was creating tensions between blacks and whites in the United States, singling out Paul Robeson as a leading member of a communist group seeking to divide the country along racial lines.
