= Karol Rathaus =

German-Austrian composer (1895–1954)

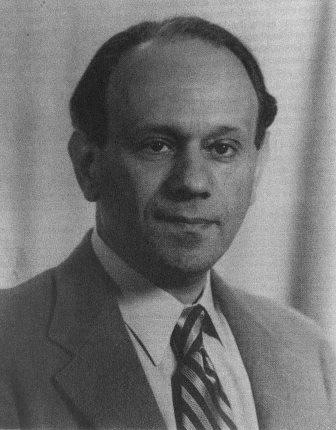
Karol Rathaus, German-Austrian composer

Karol Rathaus (Karl Leonhard Bruno Rathaus; also Leonhard Bruno; 16 September 1895 — 21 November 1954) was a German-Austrian Jewish composer who emigrated to the United States via Berlin, Paris, and London, escaping the rise of Nazism in Germany.

== Early life and Berlin ==
Born in the Ukrainian city of Ternopil (part of Austria-Hungary in 1895), Rathaus began composing at an early age, beginning his studies in 1913/1914 at the Academy of Performing Arts and Music in Vienna. His studies were interrupted by military service during the First World War. As one of the favorite pupils of Franz Schreker, Rathaus followed him to the Academy of Music in Berlin, where he continued to study music and composition. After graduation, Rathaus accepted the position of a teacher of composition and music theory at the Berlin University of the Arts. Rathaus lived in Berlin from 1922 to 1932, during which time his first compositions caused a sensation and achieved great success.

After his 1930 opera Fremde Erde, Rathaus created film music and was among the artistically outstanding film composers in Germany before 1933. He wrote the music for three films by Fyodor Otsep. In 1933 he went to Paris and lived in London from 1934 to 1938, before he finally settled in New York.

== Exile in the US ==
In 1940 he became a professor of composition at the recently founded Queens College in Long Island. In this position he achieved prestige and popularity. In addition, he was also successful as a composer, writing many commissioned works and several film scores. He died at the age of 59 in the Flushing neighborhood of New York City's borough of Queens. Handwritten manuscripts, published works, and correspondence to and from Rathaus are available for research at the Queens College Special Collections and Archives.

However, as Michael Haas has pointed out, Rathaus mostly lost the artist prestige and reputation he had enjoyed in Berlin between the wars. He took the low-paid position at Queens College to escape the threat of war, and in 1940 his worldly possessions, still in London, were destroyed by a V2 bomb. From then on he devoted himself to teaching. He "never spoke of his past to any of his students, and avoided contact with former colleagues and friends who were successfully conducting concerts and opera performances in nearby Manhattan".

His compositional output includes mostly instrumental works: symphonies, orchestral works, serenades, sonatas and ballets. He saw his compositions in the tradition of Richard Strauss, Gustav Mahler, Igor Stravinsky and his teacher Franz Schreker.

== Legacy ==
In Nazi Germany, his compositions were classified as "degenerate art" and assigned a performance ban. He is now considered one of the many great 'composers in exile'. Toccata Classics issued the CD Piano Music, Volume One, including the second piano sonata, in 2019. There are also recordings of the Piano Trios, and of the Suite for Violin & Orchestra Op.27, the Suite for Orchestra Op.29, the Serenade for Orchestra Op.35 and the Polonaise Symphonique Op.52.

Rathaus was married to Gerta and had a son named Bernt. A documentary film about Rathaus in exile has been proposed by Michael Haas and Lev Deych.

== Musical Compositions ==
Opera

- Fremde Erde (1930)

Ballet

- Der letzte Pierrot (1926)
- Le Lion amoureux (1937)

Orchestral

- Symphony No. 1 (1922)
- Symphony No. 2 (1923)
- Symphony No. 3 (1943)
- Four Dance Pieces (1924)
- Piano Concertino (1925)
- Overture (1927)
- Suite for Violin and Orchestra (1929)
- Uriel Acosta, incidental music (1930)
- Allegro concertante for Piano and Strings and Trumpet (1930)
- Suite for Orchestra (1930)
- Serenade (1932)
- Symphonic Movement (1933)
- Contrapuntal Triptych (1934)
- Nocturne: Jacob's Dream (1938)
- Piano Concerto (1939)
- Prelude and Gigue (1939)
- Music for Strings (1941)
- Polonaise symphonique (1943)
- Vision dramatique (1945)
- Salisbury Cove, overture (1949)
- Sinfonia concertante (1951)
- Prelude (1953)

Chamber

- String Quartet No. 1 (1921)
- String Quartet No. 2 (1925)
- Violin Sonata No. 1 (1925)
- Clarinet Sonata (1927)
- String Quartet No. 3 (1936)
- Violin Sonata No. 2 (1938)
- Trio for clarinet, violin and piano (1944)
- String Quartet No. 4 (1946)
- Trio Serenade for violin, cello and piano (1953)
- String Quartet No. 5 (1954)

Solo piano

- Piano Sonata No. 1 (1920)
- Fünf Klavierstücke, op. 9 (1924)
- Piano Sonata No. 2 (1924)
- Piano Sonata No. 3 (1927)
- Zwei Stücke aus dem Ballet ‘Der letzte Pierrot’ (1926, arr. 1927)
- Trois Mazurkas, op. 24 (1928)
- Three Excerpts from Der Mörder Dimitri Karamasoff (1931)
- Piano Sonata No. 4 (1946)

== Selected filmography ==
- The Trunks of Mr. O.F. (1931)
- The Brothers Karamazov (1931)
- Here's Berlin (1932)
- The Dictator (1935)
- Let Us Live (1939)

== Sources ==
- Schwarz, Boris. “Karol Rathaus.” The Musical Quarterly, vol. 41, no. 4, 1955, pp. 481–495. www.jstor.org/stable/739972.
- Guzy-Pasiak, Jolanta. "Karol Rathaus, the Transplanted Composer." Musicology Today: Émigré Composers 8 (2011): 163-77.
