= Queens College, City University of New York =

Public college in New York City, New York

Queens College
- Motto: Discimus ut serviamus (Latin)
- Motto in English: We learn so that we may serve
- Type: Public college
- Established: 1937
- Parent institution: City University of New York
- Endowment: $85 million
- President: Elizabeth (Betsy) Field Hendrey (Interim)
- Faculty: 1,693
- Students: 18,494
- Undergraduates: 14,384
- Postgraduates: 4,110
- Location: New York City, New York, U.S. 40°44′13″N 73°49′01″W
- Campus: Urban, 83 acres (34 ha)
- Newspaper: The Knight News
- Colors: Silver, navy, black, and red
- Nickname: Knights
- Sporting affiliations: NCAA Division II – ECC
- Mascot: Knight
- Website: qc.cuny.edu
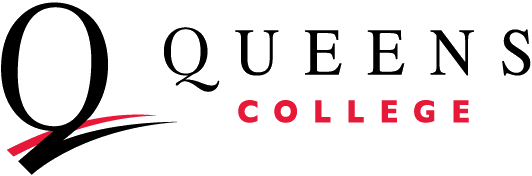

Queens College (QC) is a public college in the New York City borough of Queens. Part of the City University of New York system, Queens College occupies an 83-acre (34 ha) campus primarily located in Flushing.

Queens College was established in 1937 and offers undergraduate degrees in over 70 majors, graduate studies in over 100 degree programs and certificates, over 40 accelerated master's options, 20 doctoral degrees through the CUNY Graduate Center, and a number of advanced certificate programs. Alumni and faculty of the school, such as Arturo O'Farrill and Jerry Seinfeld, have received over 100 Grammy Award nominations.

The college is organized into seven schools. It competes in Division II of the NCAA and sponsors 15 men's and women's championship-eligible varsity teams.

== History ==
=== Before 1937 ===
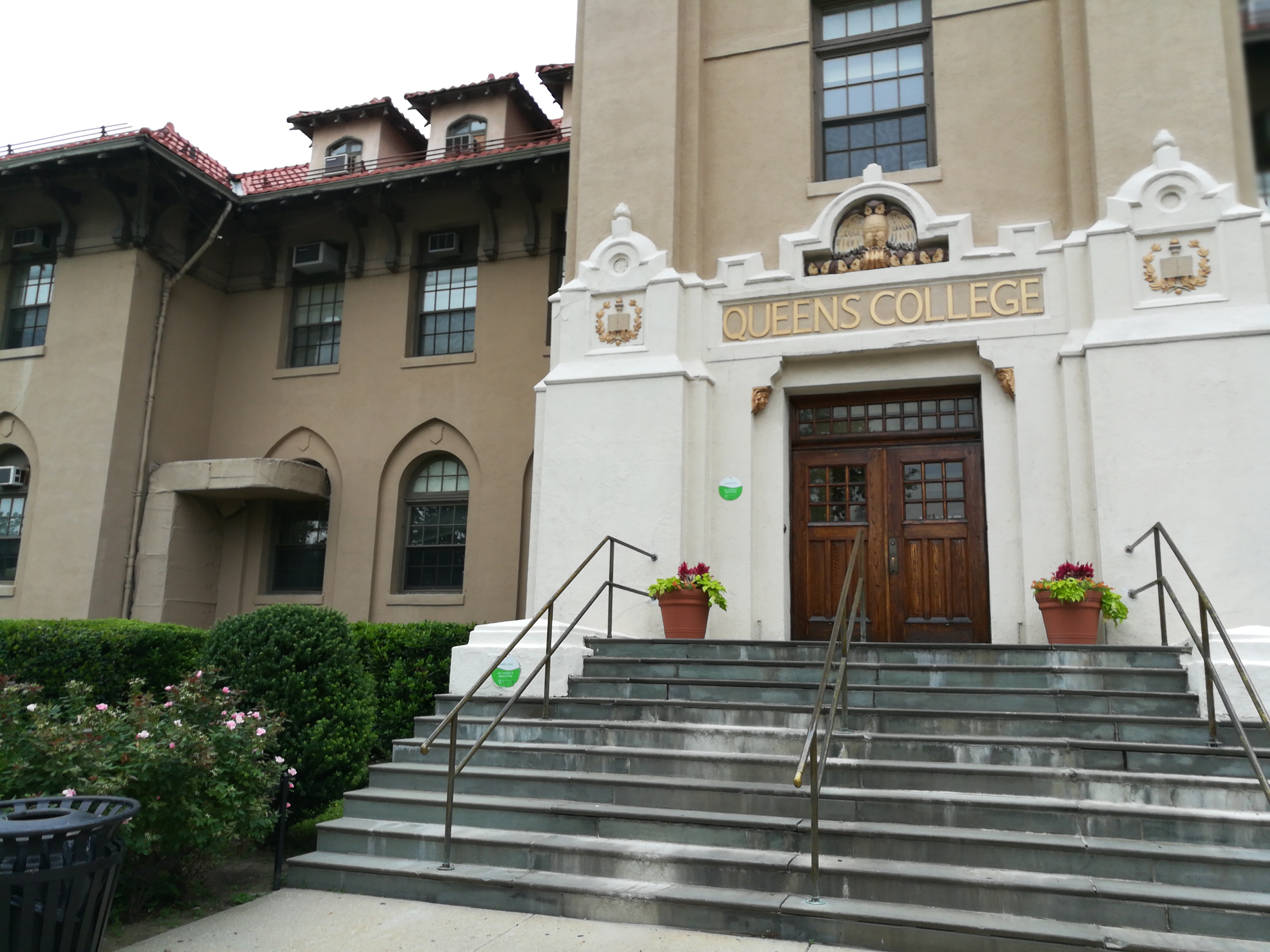
The steps of Jefferson Hall, which was the site of the New York Parental School before it closed in 1934

Before Queens College was established in 1937, the site of the campus was home to the Jamaica Academy, a one-room schoolhouse built in the early 19th century, where Walt Whitman once worked as a teacher. The building was located on Flushing-Jamaica Road (later renamed Kissena Boulevard). Jamaica Academy became public in 1844. In 1909, the New York Parental School, a home for troubled boys, opened on the land surrounding the future site of Queens College and incorporated Jamaica Academy on its campus. Buildings such as Jefferson Hall (named after Thomas Jefferson) were used as both dormitories and classrooms.

In 1934, the New York Parental School was investigated amid rumors of abuse. The school was shut down and students were transferred to local public schools. A few months later, the grounds were turned over to the city. The city planned to house 500 mental patients from Randall's Island Hospital, who were temporarily displaced by the construction of the Triborough Bridge.

=== Founding ===
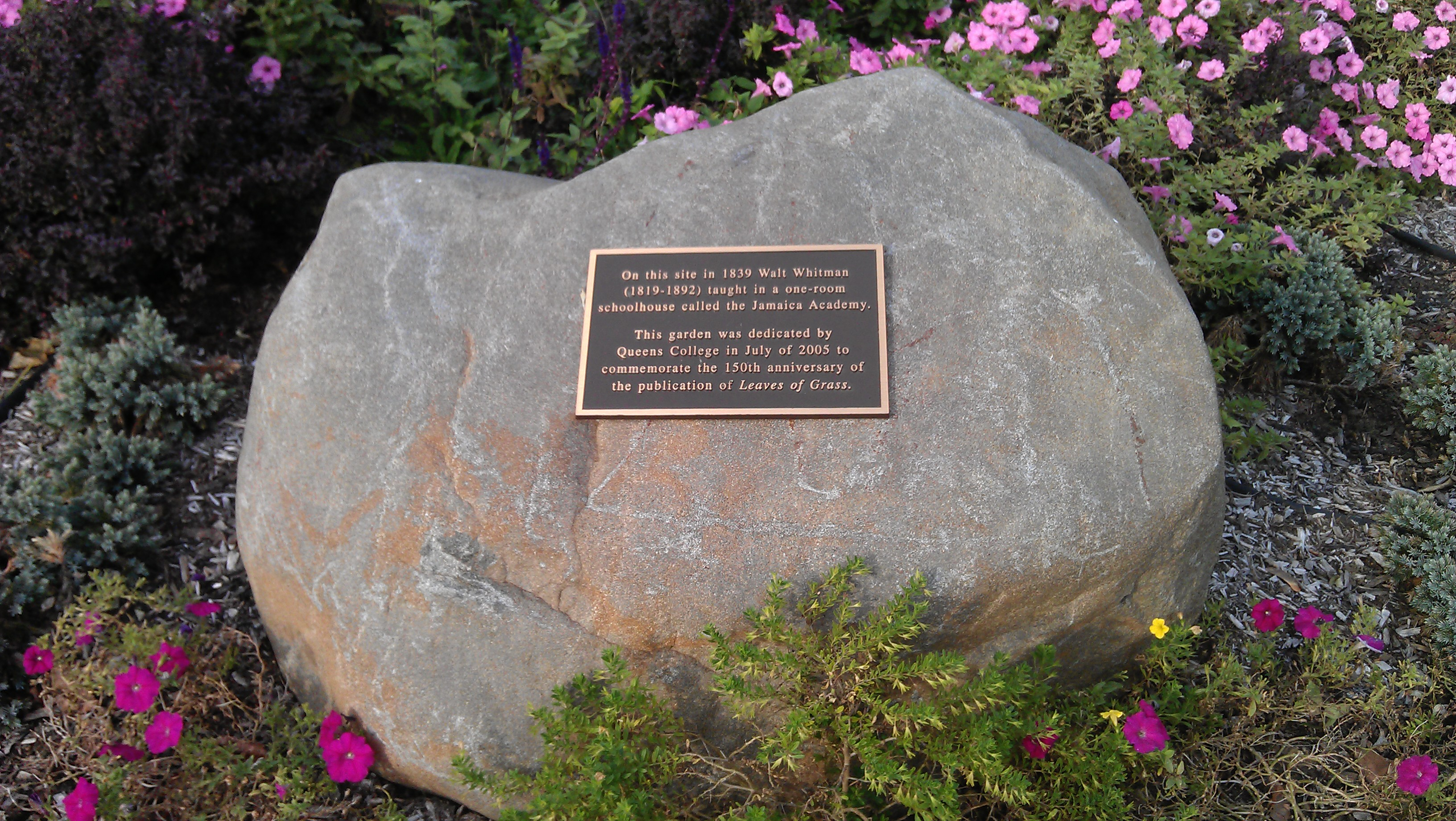
This marker, just outside the Student Union building, marks the original location of the one-room schoolhouse.

Meanwhile, County Judge Charles S. Colden appointed and chaired a committee to assess the feasibility of opening a free college in Queens. In September 1935, the committee recommended the establishment of such a college. Mayor La Guardia backed the recommendation and pushed for the free college's creation. In March 1937, the Board of Education designated the site of the former Parental School to be the future location of Queens College. Paul Klapper, former dean of the School of Education at City College of New York, was appointed the new college's president. The college opened in October 1937—later than anticipated due to a painters' strike—with 21 members on its teaching staff and 400 students in its inaugural freshmen class. The school's colors of blue and silver were selected by a "Color Committee" drawn from the entering class of students, and were announced at the first school dance, which was held on Wednesday, November 24, 1937. Around 1,200 students enlisted in the American military during World War II; fifty-nine would be killed in action.

=== Motto ===
Queens College's motto is "Discimus ut serviamus", which translates to "We learn so that we may serve." With public service for the common good on his mind, Queens College president Paul Klapper created the motto in 1937 to inspire the first class of students and the following generations.

=== Late 20th century ===
The college campus grew as buildings were constructed and enrollment increased. Changes beyond growth were in store for Queens College: in 1970, CUNY adopted the controversial policy of open admissions, which guaranteed a place at CUNY for any high school graduate in New York, regardless of traditional criteria like grades or test scores. The program was intended to offer college education to more New York City residents, in particular those of color. Open admissions did not seem to affect Queens College as much as it did other schools — a year after its implementation, only 10% of its student body was black or Puerto Rican, according to the newly appointed college president, Joseph S. Murphy. In 1973, enrollment at Queens reached an all-time high of 31,413 students. By 1976 new concerns overtook the college as New York City faced a crippling financial crisis. CUNY's policy of free tuition was revoked; the overall CUNY budget was cut by $135 million; and CUNY Chancellor Robert Kibbee demanded that Queens College slash its budget by 15%. Some faculty members resigned in protest. The New York Times reported in December 1976 that "Queens College, considered the jewel in the university's crown, has been particularly hard hit by the cuts, which have gone to the heart of the faculty." All hiring and building on campus was halted.

In 1979, President Jimmy Carter became the first sitting president to visit Queens College, where he conducted a Town Hall Meeting at Colden Center.

By 1984, student enrollment had declined to 15,000. However, with a $175 million building program in place by 1986 for the college's 50th anniversary, enrollments were expected to rise and the college was beginning to recover from the financial crisis of the 1970s. In addition, the student body, in accordance with the mission of the short-lived Open Admissions program, had grown much more diverse, and college faculty were trained to understand Latin American culture and how to teach American literature to non-native students. By that time, former Queens College president Joseph S. Murphy was CUNY chancellor. In the 1990s, the college attracted high-profile researchers to its faculty, including the virologist Luc Montagnier. Under President Allen Lee Sessoms, the college underwent some growth but also some missteps, including the highly publicized inability to fund the planned AIDS research center that Montagnier had been hired to lead.

==== Involvement in the Civil Rights Movement ====
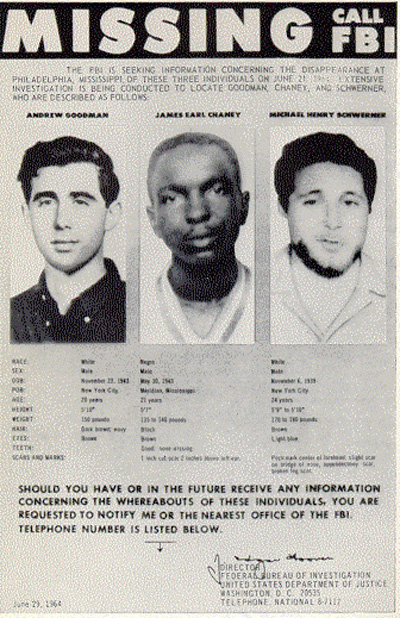
Missing persons poster created by the FBI in 1964, shows the photographs of Goodman, Chaney, and Schwerner.

Queens College students were active participants in the Civil Rights Movement of the 1960s, including the March on Washington for Jobs and Freedom in 1963. The most well-known student activist was Andrew Goodman, who was slain in Mississippi in 1964 with two other young men, James Chaney, and Michael Schwerner; all three were trying to register African Americans to vote in the South. Schwerner and Chaney were on the organizing staff of CORE; Goodman was a Freedom Summer volunteer. The three activists were stopped and arrested for allegedly driving over the speed limit on a Mississippi road. After being brought into the sheriff's department and released, the three young men were stopped by two carloads of Ku Klux Klan members on a remote rural road. The men approached their car, then shot and killed all three young men. The murders received national attention, and six conspirators were brought to trial and convicted by federal prosecutors for civil rights violations. The Chaney-Goodman-Schwerner Clock Tower of Rosenthal Library, a highly visible borough landmark, is named in their honor.

In February 2011, Queens College inherited the personal collection of the late James Forman. The collection, along with other civil rights leaders' collections, is available online at the Queens College Civil Rights Archive. A special program on February 17, 2011, included a presentation by the Honorable Julian Bond for Black History Month, as well as a formal announcement of the acquisition.

=== 21st century ===
The college campus continued improving its facilities. Under a $1 billion CUNY-wide improvement program, Queens College's Powdermaker Hall was given a $57 million renovation, begun in 2000.

By 2014, enrollment was 20,000 students, half of whom came from minority backgrounds.

Felix V. Matos Rodriguez was appointed president of Queens College by the CUNY Board of Trustees in 2014. Five years later, he became the first Latino Chancellor of the City University of New York. William Tramontano served as QC's interim president from 2019 until July 1, 2020, when Frank H. Wu succeeded him as the new college president.

Budgetary pressures from city government continued to affect Queens College in the 2020s. In November 2023, Mayor Eric Adams ordered $23 million in CUNY-wide cuts. As a result, two weeks before the start of classes, Queens College did not reappoint 26 faculty lecturers. That number fell to 24, and 10 were re-hired on an adjunct basis. Courses without instructors were cancelled or divided among remaining faculty. In November 2025, Queens College announced the implementation of a temporary internal hiring freeze, affecting all new full-time and part-time positions. By March 2026, Queens College has lost 87 full-time staff positions and 61 full-time faculty members, compared to Fall 2023.

On March 25, 2026, Queens College received an anonymous threat during the site visit from the Middle States Commission on Higher Education, demanding the removal of president Frank H. Wu and other cabinet members. On June 22, 2026, Frank H. Wu announced his retirement as Queens College president, effective July 30, 2026. On June 29, 2026, Elizabeth Hendrey was appointed interim president of Queens College, effective August 1, 2026.

== Campus and facilities ==
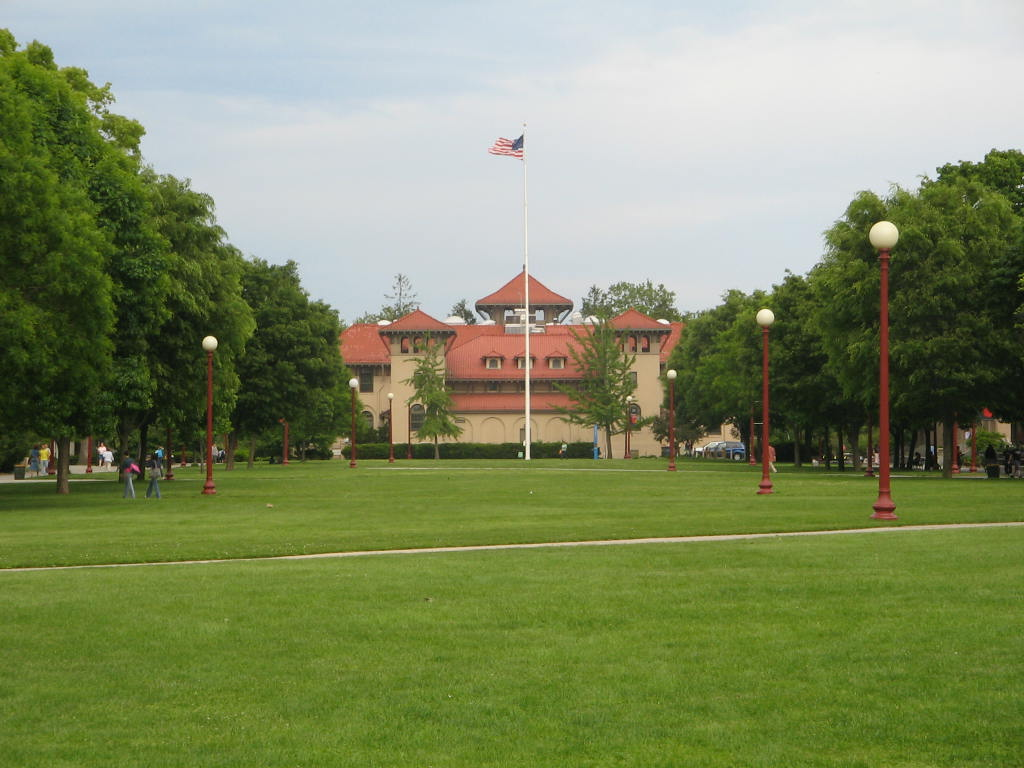
The Queens College quad

The 83-acre (34 ha) campus, located off Kissena Boulevard, is on a 100-foot (30 m)-high hill that faces Manhattan. Six of the original Spanish-style buildings dating back to the early 20th century still stand, such as Jefferson Hall, which was built in 1907. The college has since expanded to over 40 buildings, including the main classroom building, Powdermaker Hall, rebuilt in 2003 and named after the college's distinguished anthropologist Hortense Powdermaker.

Queens College is one of two CUNY colleges that participates in Division II sports (the other is the College of Staten Island). A Child Development Center, staffed by professionals, offers inexpensive child care services to students with children.

The Godwin-Ternbach Museum, which opened in 1981 and houses more than 7,000 works of art, is located in Queens College's Klapper Hall, named after the former school president, Paul Klapper. Godwin-Ternbach Museum is the only museum in the City University of New York (CUNY) system, and is the only encyclopedic collection of its kind in the borough of Queens. Its collection is global in breadth and deeply historical, with works of art and artifacts ranging from antiquity to the present. The outdoor plaza in front of the museum hosts a site-specific installation by Vito Acconci titled, "More Balls For Klapper Hall" (or "Untitled"). The artwork had been damaged over the years, and is in the second phase of a complete conservation program enacted by the college administration. Klapper Hall also houses the Fine Arts and English Departments, and boasts the largest ceramics studio within the CUNY system. Other facilities in this building include a metal working studio and foundry, wood shop, black and white darkroom, student gallery and a suite of art studios for BFA and MFA candidates.

The college has a low-rise 506-bed residence hall on campus called the Summit Apartments, which opened in late 2009. This makes Queens College one of six CUNY campuses with dorm facilities (the others being Hunter College, the College of Staten Island, Baruch College, CUNY Graduate Center and City College).

The college is home to the Aaron Copland School of Music (named for Aaron Copland), which is located in the Music Building. The Music Building also houses the music library and the 490-seat LeFrak Concert Hall.

CUNY School of Law was previously located to the west of the campus of Queens College; while it was always a separate administrative unit of CUNY, the building itself read "CUNY School of Law at Queens College", and was once a building for the Department of Education. The CUNY Board of Trustees approved plans for the Law School to be relocated to 2 Court Square in Long Island City, with the first semester of classes held in 2012. Queens College has since taken over the former Law School building, now named Queens Hall and home to the college's language departments.

Townsend Harris High School and The Queens College School for Math, Science and Technology (PS/IS 499) are located at the edge of the Queens College campus.

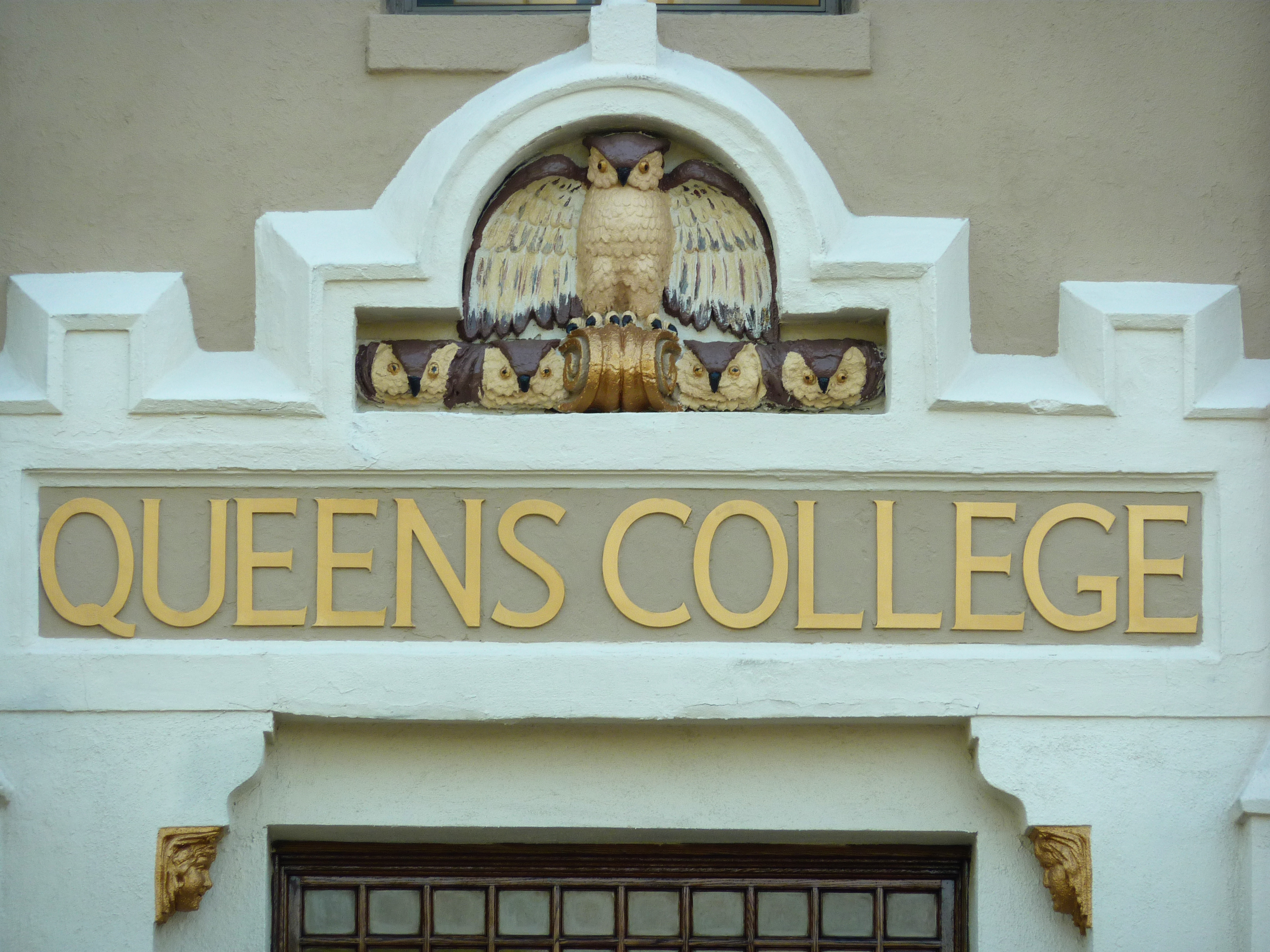
An owl, symbolizing knowledge and wisdom, is carved above the entrance to Jefferson Hall.

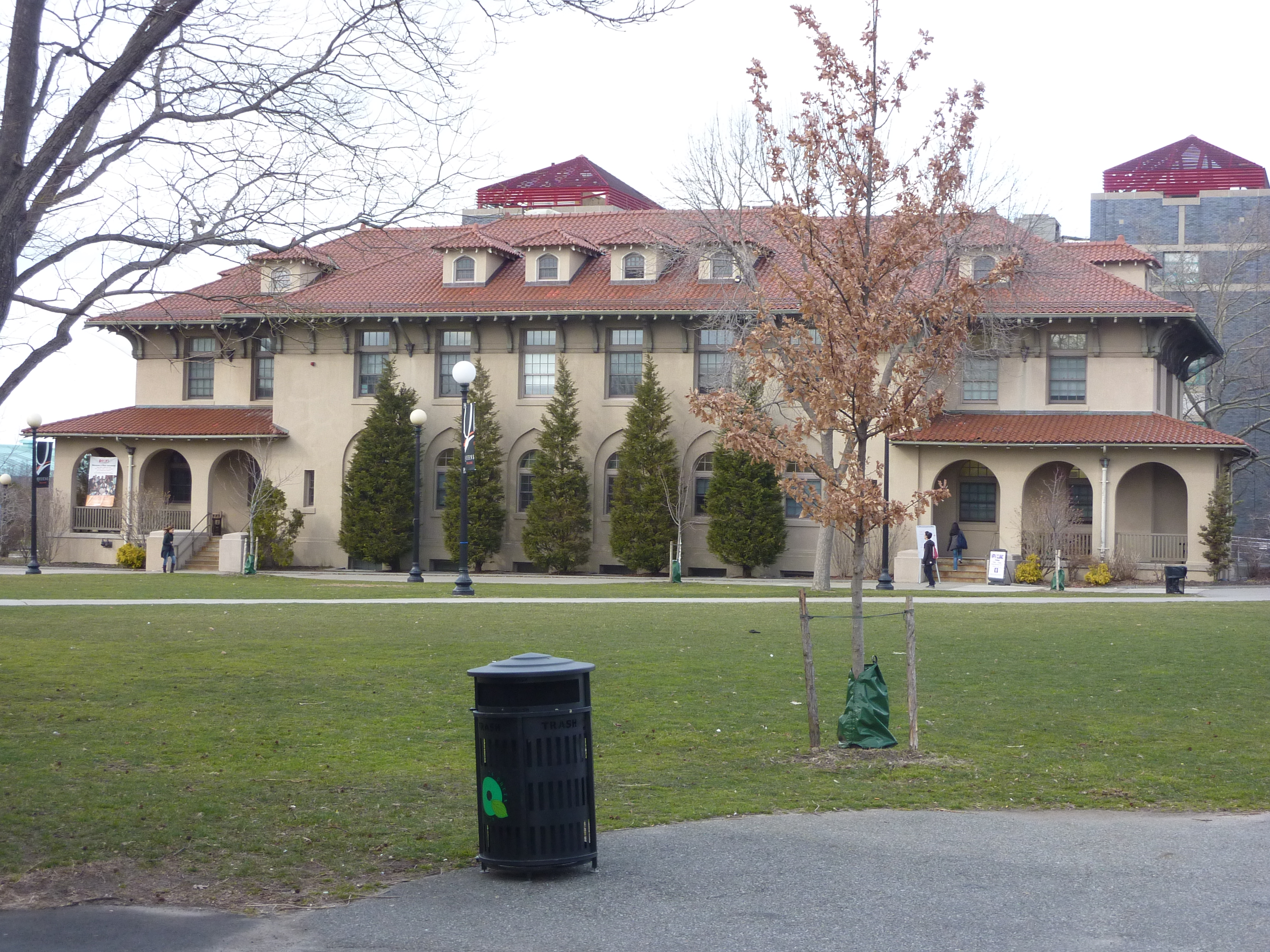
Many of Queens College's original Spanish-style buildings are still in use today.

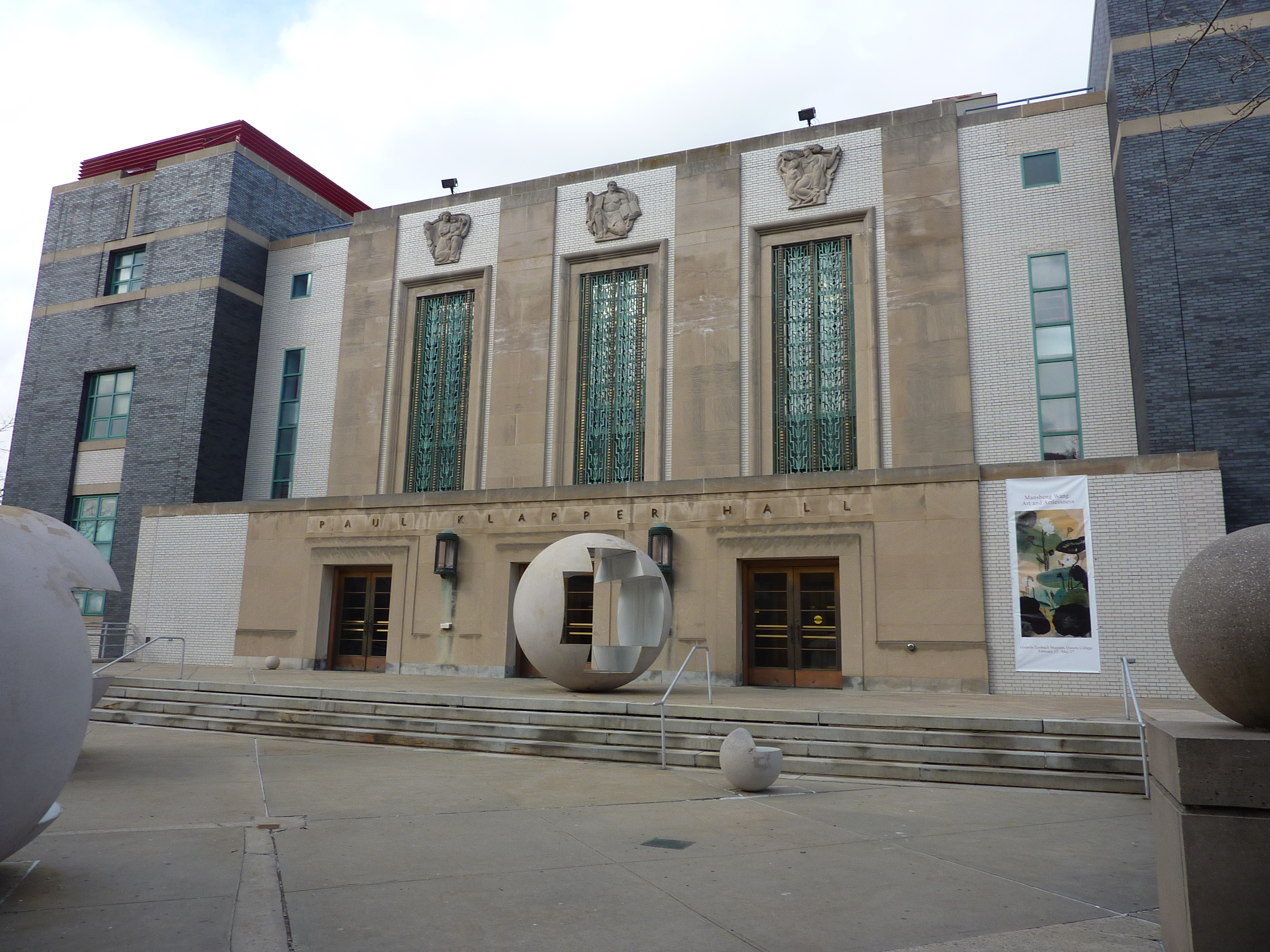
Klapper Hall opened in 1955 as the college's first library. Named after the college's first president, Paul Klapper, it was renovated in 1992 after the construction of Rosenthal Library.

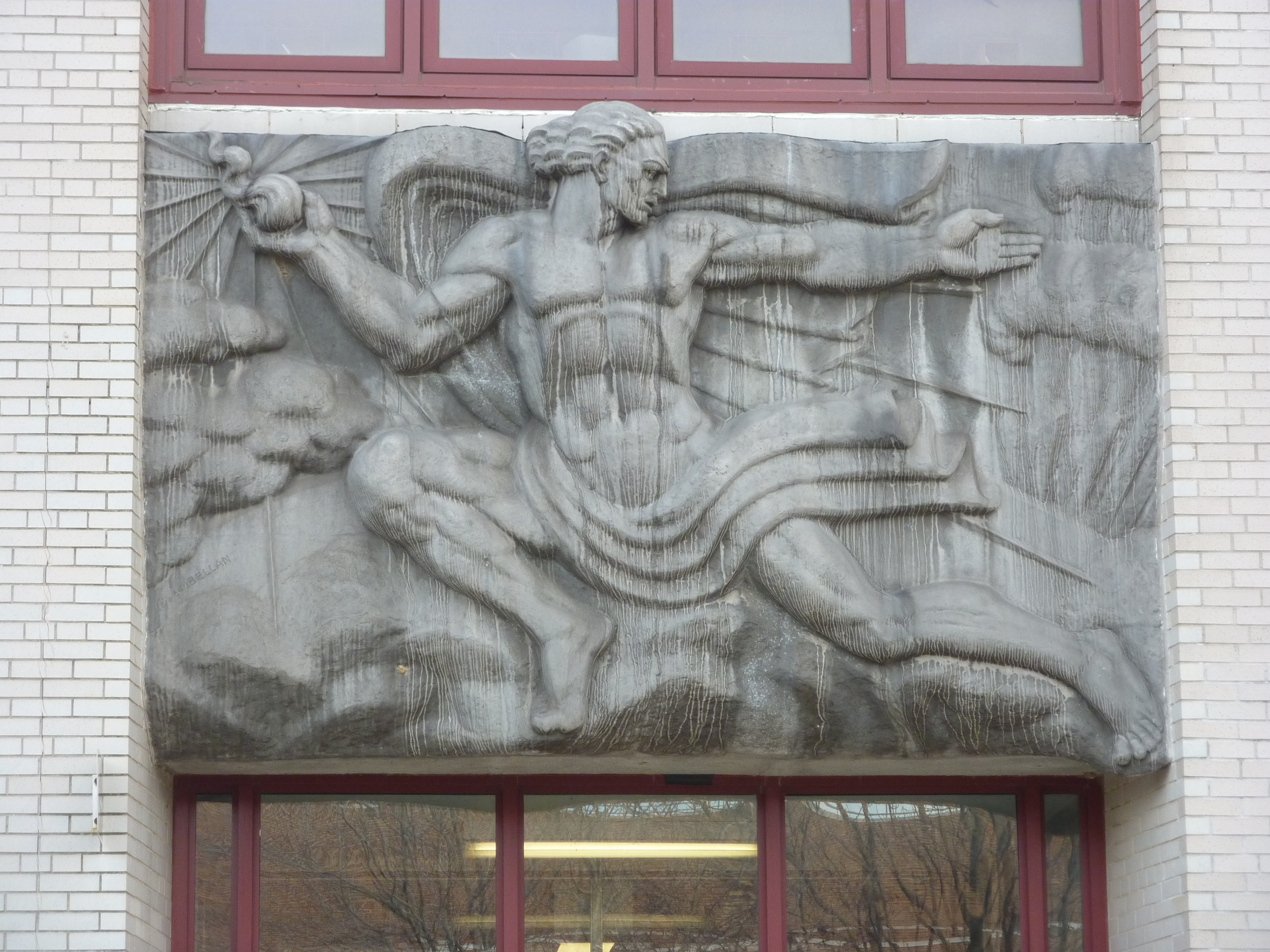
A relief of Prometheus giving fire to humanity on the facade of Remsen Hall

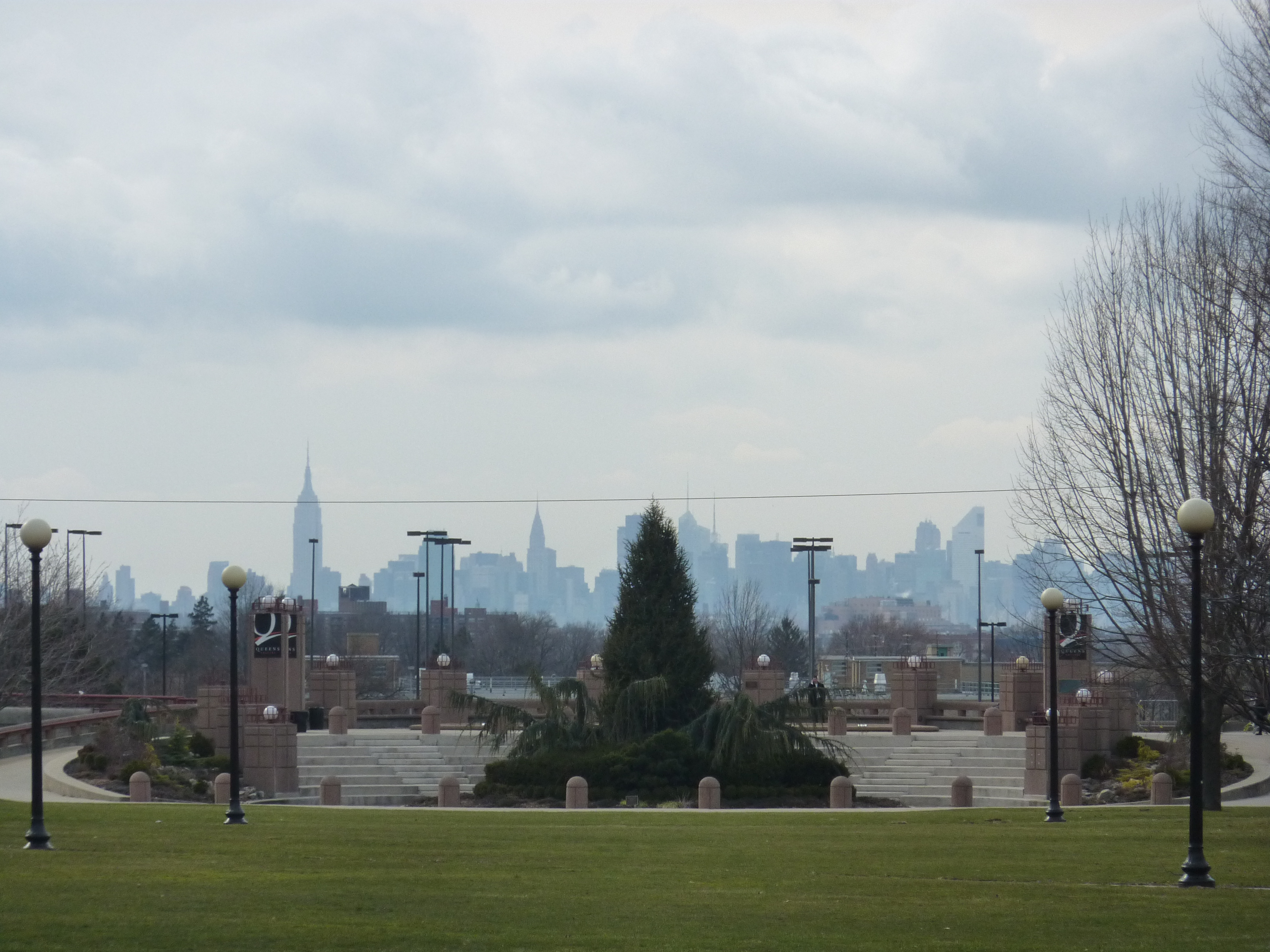
View of the New York City skyline from the Queens College quad

=== The Kupferberg Center for the Arts ===
The Kupferberg Center for the Arts is home to Colden Auditorium, Goldstein Theatre, and the Ethel & Samuel Lefrak Concert Hall. Trevor Noah, Jerry Seinfeld, David Bowie, Patti LaBelle and Johnny Mathis, The Byrds, Victor Manuelle, Cesar Millan, and El Gran Combo have performed at Colden.

=== Benjamin Rosenthal Library ===
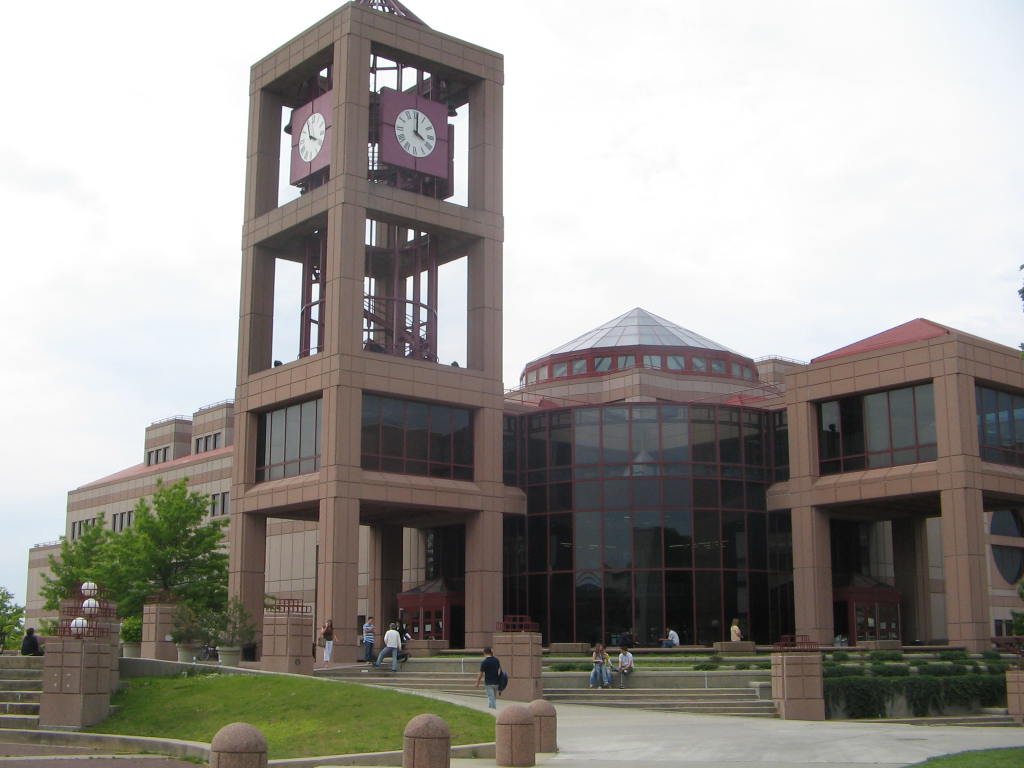
Rosenthal Library

The campus contains the Benjamin Rosenthal Library. The library's Chaney-Schwerner-Goodman Clocktower was named after the three civil rights workers who were murdered in 1964, including Andrew Goodman, a Queens College student. Built in 1988, the library contains over 840,000 books, 32,600 print and electronic materials, the electronic archives, a collection of multimedia materials in its Media Center and an art center. The library is also home to the Louis Armstrong archives.

The Art Library and the Queens College Art Center are on the sixth floor of Rosenthal. The Art Library has over 70,000 books; 5,000 bound periodicals; and 110,000 slides, pictures, and exhibition catalogs and pamphlets. The collection includes resources for the study of all aspects of the visual arts and material culture, including art and architectural history, theory, criticism, materials, techniques, and practice.

Nurtured by both the Aaron Copland School of Music and the Queens College Library, the Music Library has evolved into a first-class research facility and is the largest music collection in the CUNY system. The Music Library is located on two levels in the School of Music building and contains over 35,000 scores, 30,000 books, and 20,000 sound recordings, including the David S. Walker Music Education Collection and the Ursula Springer Choral Music Collection.

=== Godwin-Ternbach Museum ===
Since 1957 Queens College has been collecting works of art, these collections were initially used for teaching purposes and were meant to serve the college community. The collections were eventually brought together with the establishment of the Godwin-Ternbach Museum in 1981. The museum is now a part of the Kupferberg Center for the Arts, which has joined all the arts entities on campus in collaborations of visual, performance, dance, and theater arts. Former museum director, Amy Winter spent 16 years from the early 1990s on, introducing an active exhibition program and an expansion of collections related care and management. To address these concerns, Winter turned to MAP (The Museum Assessment Program); as a result not only did the museum improve its facilities but increased its collections-related staff as well. Co-directors Maria C. Pio and Louise Weinberg, manage the museum. Exhibitions and programs are free and open to the public. The museum is an integral part of Queens College that serves not only the students, faculty, and staff but the community at large.

The Godwin-Ternbach Museum's founders were Frances Godwin and Joseph Ternbach. Frances Godwin taught art history at Queens College with a focus on early and Medieval Christian art. Joseph Ternbach was an art restorer who moved to Queens after escaping Nazi persecution in Vienna. A recent 2025 exhibition entitled "Quinceañera: Dress and Memory in Latine Culture" celebrated the coming-of-age tradition of the Quinceañera ceremony.

The museum, located in Klapper Hall, maintains a fine collection of 7,000 pieces of art, as well as artifacts from all cultures dating from ancient times to the modern day. These include works by Rembrandt, Louise Nevelson, Pablo Picasso, Claudia DeMonte, Henri Matisse, Andy Warhol, Margot Lovejoy, Hale Aspacio Woodruff, and Georges Braque.

=== Residence ===
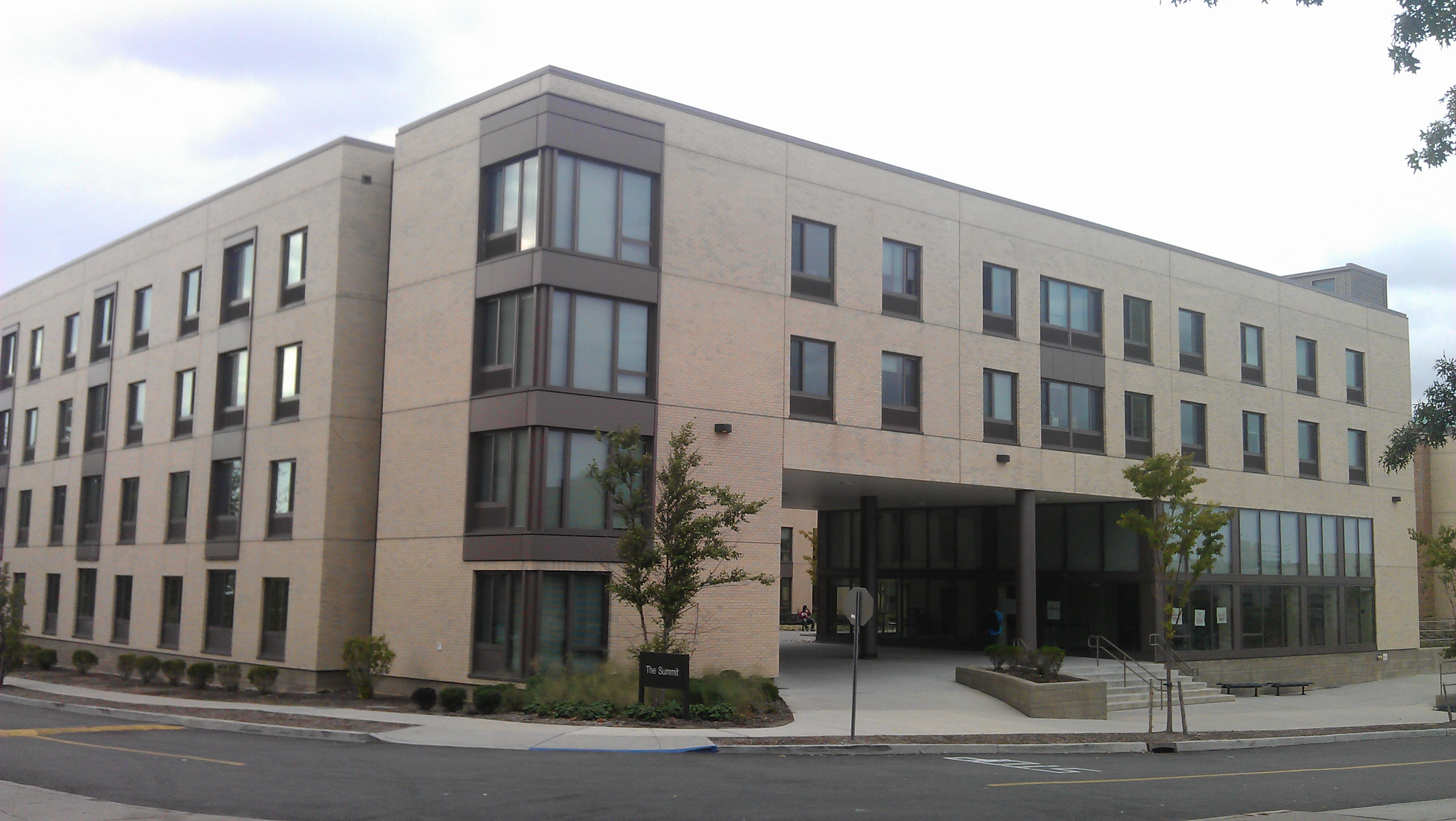
The Summit, Queens College's first residence hall, opened in the fall of 2009.

Queens College's first residence hall, the Summit Apartments, opened in 2009. This low-rise, 506-bed facility is located in the middle of the campus. Queens College is still primarily a commuter school, as only 500 of its over 19,000 students live on campus. The building has a gold certificate from the Leadership in Energy and Environmental Design (LEED), an organization that certifies buildings to have met environmentally sustainable construction standards. Queens College's residence hall offers study lounges on each floor, wireless internet, laundry services, and a state of the art fitness center. The Summit Apartments also includes kitchens with full-size appliances, as well as dining areas, microwaves, couches, entertainment stands, and music practice rooms.

In addition to the Summit, many students rent apartments off-campus in the surrounding neighborhoods.

== Academics ==
=== Rankings ===
Academic rankings

Master's
- Washington Monthly: 112

Regional
- U.S. News & World Report: 50

National
- Forbes: 143
- WSJ/College Pulse: 292

USNWR regional rankings - North
Top Regional Public Schools (North)	9
Best Value Schools	69
Top Performers on Social Mobility	10
Best Colleges for Veterans	29
Best Undergraduate Teaching	21

2020 USNWR graduate school rankings
Program	Ranking
Clinical Psychology	138
Fine Arts Programs	110
Library and Information Studies Programs	40
Psychology	98
Speech–Language Pathology	72

- In The Princeton Review's 2012 edition of "America's Best Value Colleges", Queens College was ranked eighth in the United States.
- In 2008, Queens College was ranked as one of the "25 Hottest Universities" in the Newsweek/Kaplan 2008 College Guide.
- In 2013, Queens College was ranked #2 nationally in Washington Monthly's "Best Bang For Your Buck" college guide.
- In 2015, Queens College was included in The Princeton Review's list of top 322 green campuses.
- In 2020, Queens College was ranked #4 as one of the "24 Colleges with the Best Return on Investment" by Business Insider.
- Forbes ranked Queens College 143rd out of the top 500 rated private and public colleges and universities in America for the 2025–26 report. Queens College was also ranked 92nd among public colleges and 80th in the northeast. In 2019, Forbes named Queens College as the #34 on the "America's Best Value Colleges" list.

=== Degrees and programs ===
Queens College offers undergraduate degrees in 78 majors, over 100 master's degrees, over 40 accelerated master's options, 20 doctoral degrees through the CUNY Graduate Center, and a number of advanced certificate programs. It is also one of seven participating schools in the CUNY Macaulay Honors College. Queens College has a Freshman Honors Program, as well as a program called TIME 2000 for future math educators. The college's Professional & Continuing Studies program offers non-credit courses in such fields as health care, real estate, and risk management.

There are seven schools within the college: Aaron Copland School of Music, Graduate School of Library and Information Studies, School of Arts & Humanities, School of Earth and Environmental Sciences, School of Education, School of Math and Natural Sciences, and School of Social Sciences.

==== The Aaron Copland School of Music ====
The Aaron Copland School of Music is one of the oldest departments at Queens College, founded when the college opened in 1937. The department's curriculum was originally established by Edwin Stringham, and a later emphasis on the analytical system of Heinrich Schenker was initiated by Saul Novack. It offers undergraduate and graduate degrees.

==== School of Information Studies (SIS) ====
The School of Information Studies (SIS) is an American Library Association accredited program and the only public school of library science in New York City. The school offers a Master of Library Science (MLS), MLS School Media Specialist, and dual MLS/MA in history degree paths. Additionally, the school offers two professional certificates, one in Children and Young Adult Services as well as one in Archives, Records Management, and Preservation.

Starting as a program within the education department at Queens College in 1955, GSLIS began issuing MLS degrees in 1965. It achieved status as a separate school for graduate studies within Queens College in 1979. In 2002, the school opened its Children and Young Adult Services certificate and, in 2003, its Archives, Records Management, and Preservation certificate. In 2025, the School changed its name to Queens College School of Information Studies.

=== Academic centers and institutes ===
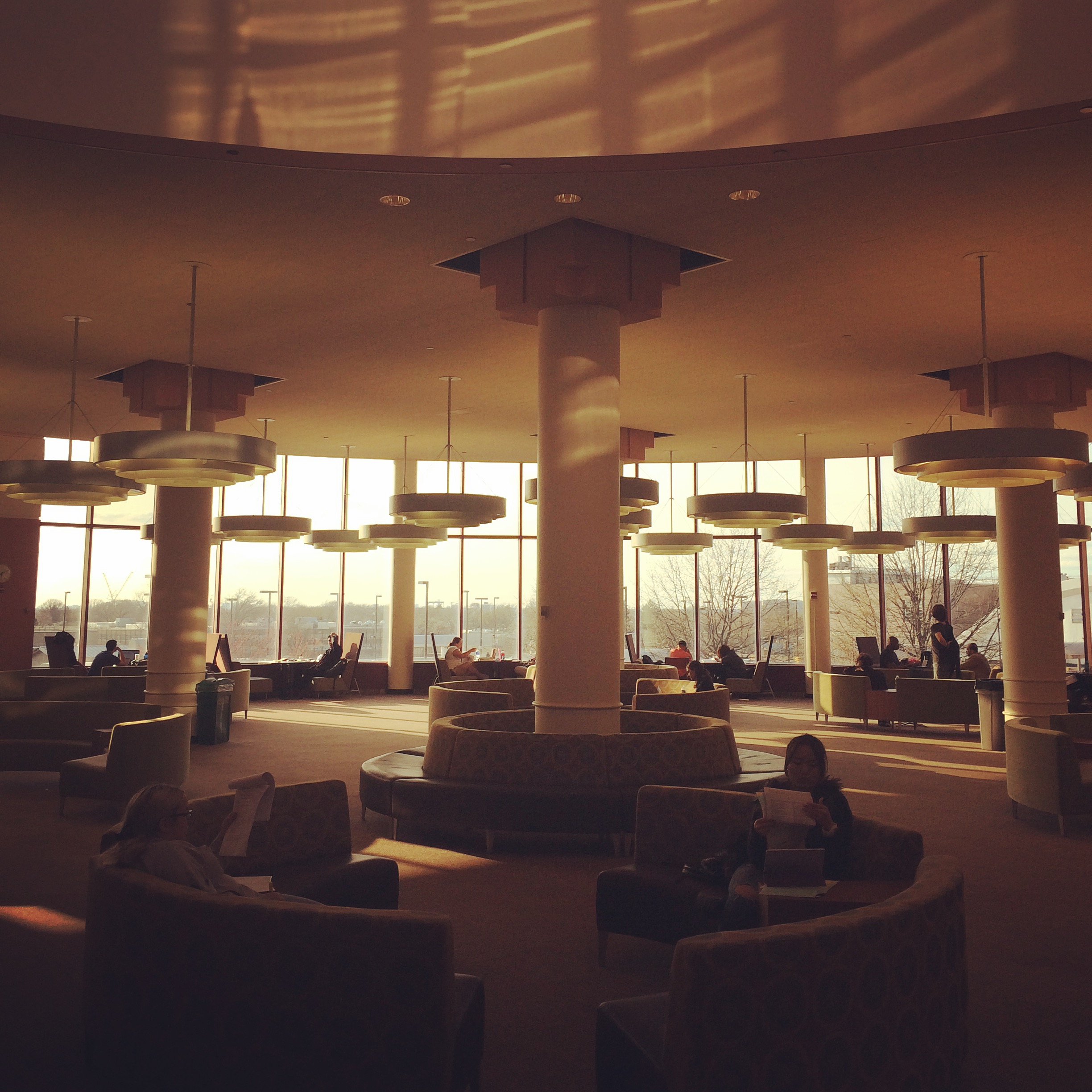
Rosenthal Library

The college is home to many centers which focus their research on various pressing social issues facing the local communities, students, faculty and the many ethnic and religious groups of the Queens area.

- Asian American/Asian Research Institute: Works to integrate the talents of individual faculty and the resources of other CUNY institutes to create a community of scholars to help focus their energies on Asia and the Asian American experience.
- Asian/American Center: Dedicated to community-oriented research that analyzes the multi-cultural diaspora experience of Asians in global and local communities.
- John D. Calandra Italian American Institute: Fosters higher education among Italian-Americans and ensures that the legacy of the Italian-American experience is documented and preserved for future generations. This is accomplished through research, counseling, lectures, symposia, and administering an exchange program with CUNY and Italian universities.
- Barry Commoner Center for Health and the Environment (formerly Center for the Biology of Natural Systems): Recent projects include a study of the impact of air pollution on asthma sufferers in the South Bronx and a continuing examination of the health workers involved in the cleanup of ground zero after the terrorist attacks of September 11, 2001.
- Center for Byzantine and Modern Greek Studies: Initiates, supports, and coordinates the teaching of Byzantine and modern Greek studies. The center also promotes Byzantine and Neo-Hellenic scholarship and publications, and relates academic research and teaching to the needs of the Greek community in Queens and elsewhere.
- Center for Jewish Studies: Through outreach and research, the Center for Jewish Studies serves as a bridge between the academic program and the social community. Its Ibrahim Leadership and Dialogue Fellowship program, the only trip to bring students to both Palestine and Saudi Arabia, is run partly through the Center for Jewish Studies.
- John Cardinal Newman Club: Run by the Catholic Newman Center, this area provides a social environment for all students of all faiths.
- Center for the Improvement of Education: Builds relationships between public schools and Queens College.
- The Michael Harrington Center for Democratic Values and Social Change: Promotes public discourse about social issues, advocates for social change, and works in partnerships with others to build a more just and equitable democratic society. The institute is primarily concerned with the employment, health, and educational needs of economically disadvantaged communities.
- The Neuroscience Research Center:The center has programs at both the undergraduate and graduate levels. Members of the center have established a five-year NIH MARC program at the college for minorities in the biomedical research sciences. The faculty at the center have produced over 800 peer-reviewed publications over the past fifteen years, with nearly 300 in the past five years alone. Since 1990, the center faculty have also received funding for 51 external and 54 internal grants.
- Queens College Model United Nations Team: Run in conjunction with the Political Science Department, this program provides students the opportunity to explore their interests in the international policy and the United Nations.
- Queens Memory Project: The Queens Memory Project, a digital archive which aims to record and preserve contemporary history across the borough of Queens, is a collaborative effort between Queens College and Queens Library that includes digitized materials from the Rosenthal Library's Department of Special Collections.
- The Center for Ethnic, Racial and Religious Understanding: CERRU was created in fall 2009 through a grant from the US Department of Education. CERRU is a non-partisan organization that facilitates cross-cultural engagement

== Student life ==
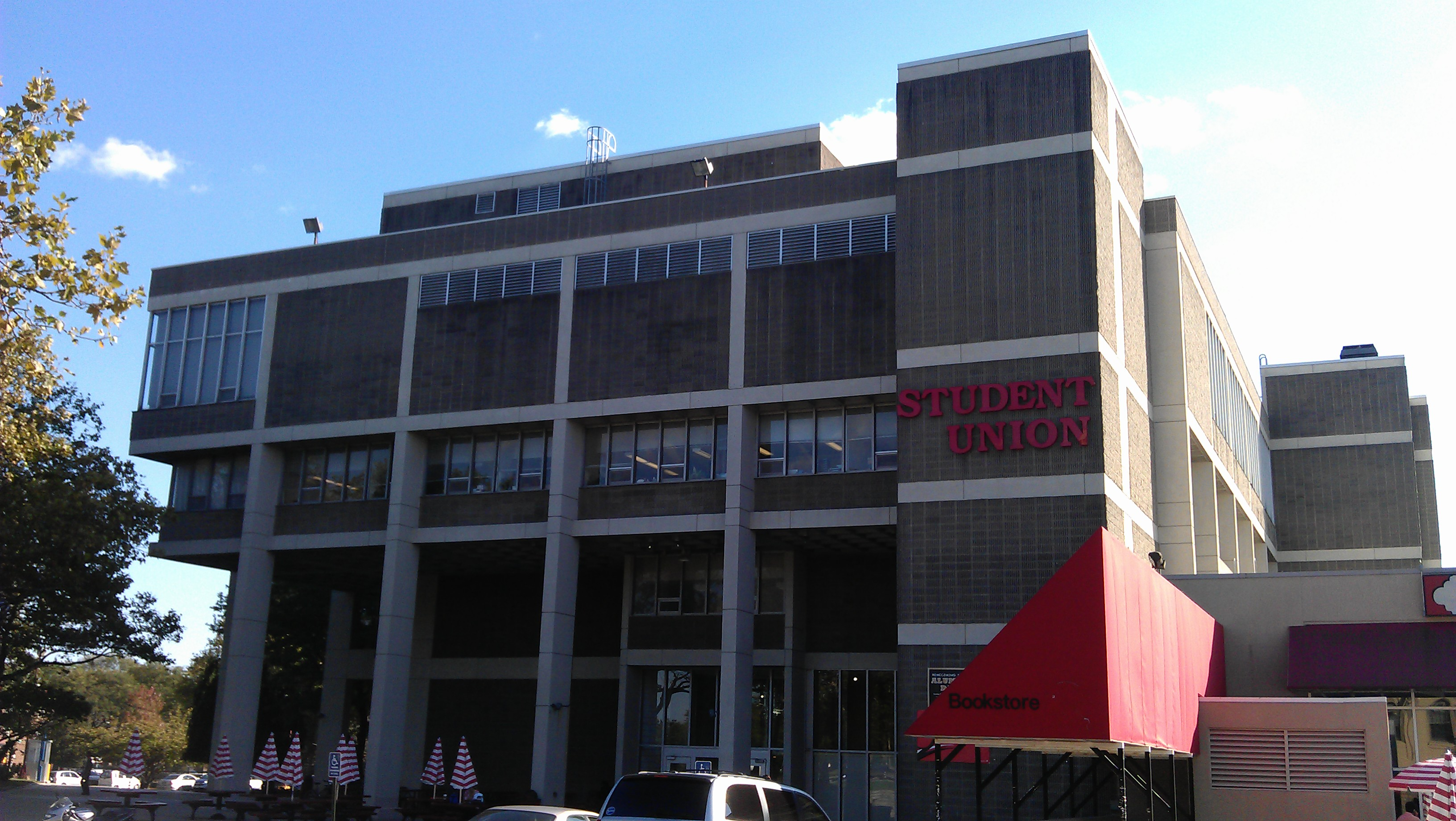
The Student Union building is home to most of the clubs on campus.

Undergraduate demographics as of Fall 2023
Race and ethnicity	Total
Asian	31%
Hispanic	30%
White	19%
Black	10%
International student	6%
Two or more races	3%
Economic diversity
Low-income (Note: The percentage of students who received an income-based federal Pell grant intended for low-income students.)	50%
Affluent (Note: The percentage of students who are a part of the American middle class at the bare minimum.)	50%

As of 2024, Queens College students represent over 140 countries and speak over 80 different native languages. This rich variety has influenced Queens College's curriculum, research, and outreach programs.

=== Clubs ===
Queens College has over 100 different clubs and organizations, ranging from fraternities/sororities to cultural, religious, technology, and art clubs. Most of the organizations are located within the Student Union building. To complement the college's educational mission, the Student Union provides various facilities, services, co-curricular activities, and programs.

=== Greek life ===
Queens College Greek life consists of eight fraternities and seven sororities. According to campus sources, Greek membership numbers in the hundreds, with more members in Greek Life than in all the other clubs combined.

== Athletics ==
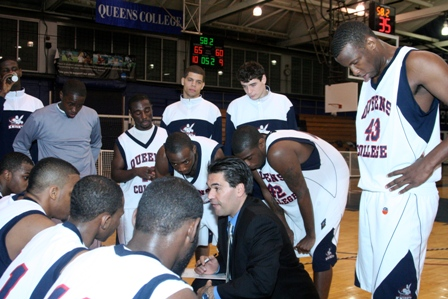
The Queens College Men's Basketball team. QC and College of Staten Island are the only CUNY schools to participate in NCAA Division II sports.

Queens College's athletic teams are the Knights. The college is a member of the Division II level of the National Collegiate Athletic Association (NCAA), primarily competing in the East Coast Conference (ECC, formerly known as the New York Collegiate Athletic Conference until after the 2005–06 school year) since the 1989–90 academic year. The Knights previously competed in the City University of New York Athletic Conference (CUNYAC) at the Division III level from 1978 to 1980.

Queens College competes in 15 intercollegiate varsity sports: Men's sports include baseball, basketball, cross country, soccer, tennis and track & field; women's sports include basketball, cross country, dance, soccer, softball, swimming & diving, tennis, track & field and volleyball. The longest running among these programs are the men's basketball and baseball teams.

== Notable alumni and faculty ==
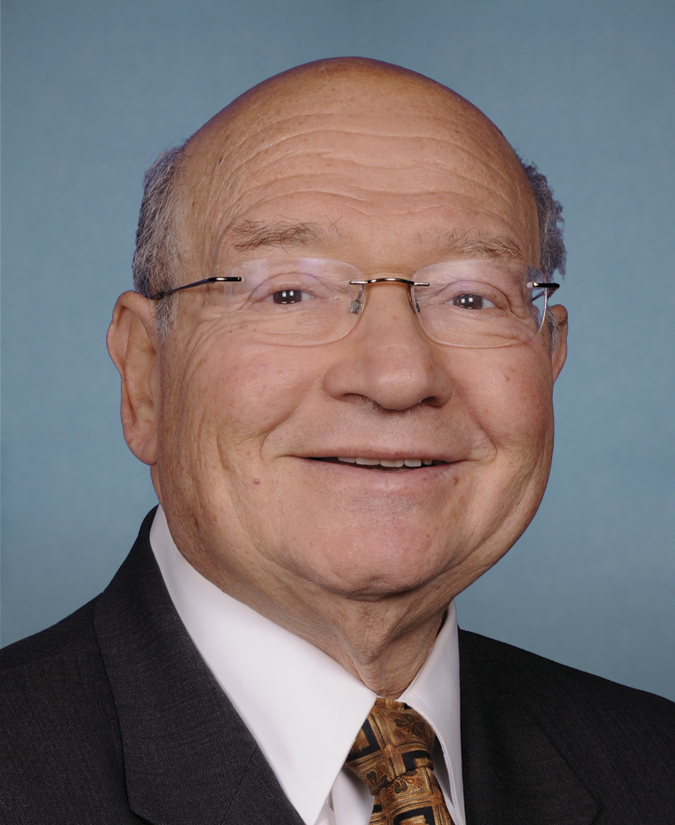
Gary Ackerman – US House of Representatives ('65)

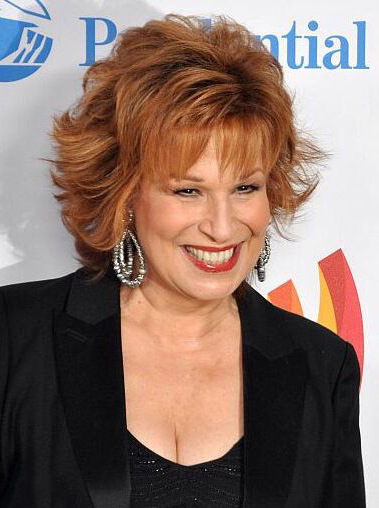
Joy Behar – comedian and co-host of The View ('64)

Dan Bongino - 20th Deputy Director of the FBI and political commentator

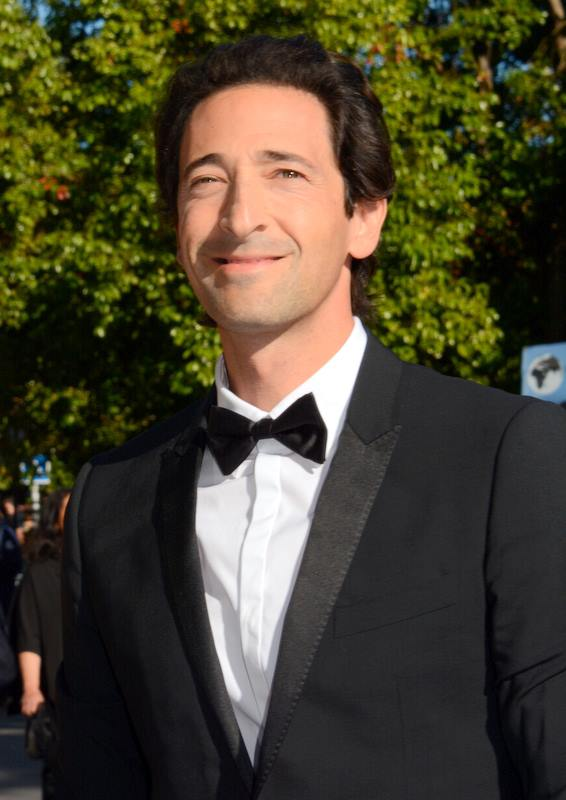
Adrien Brody – actor, Academy Award winner

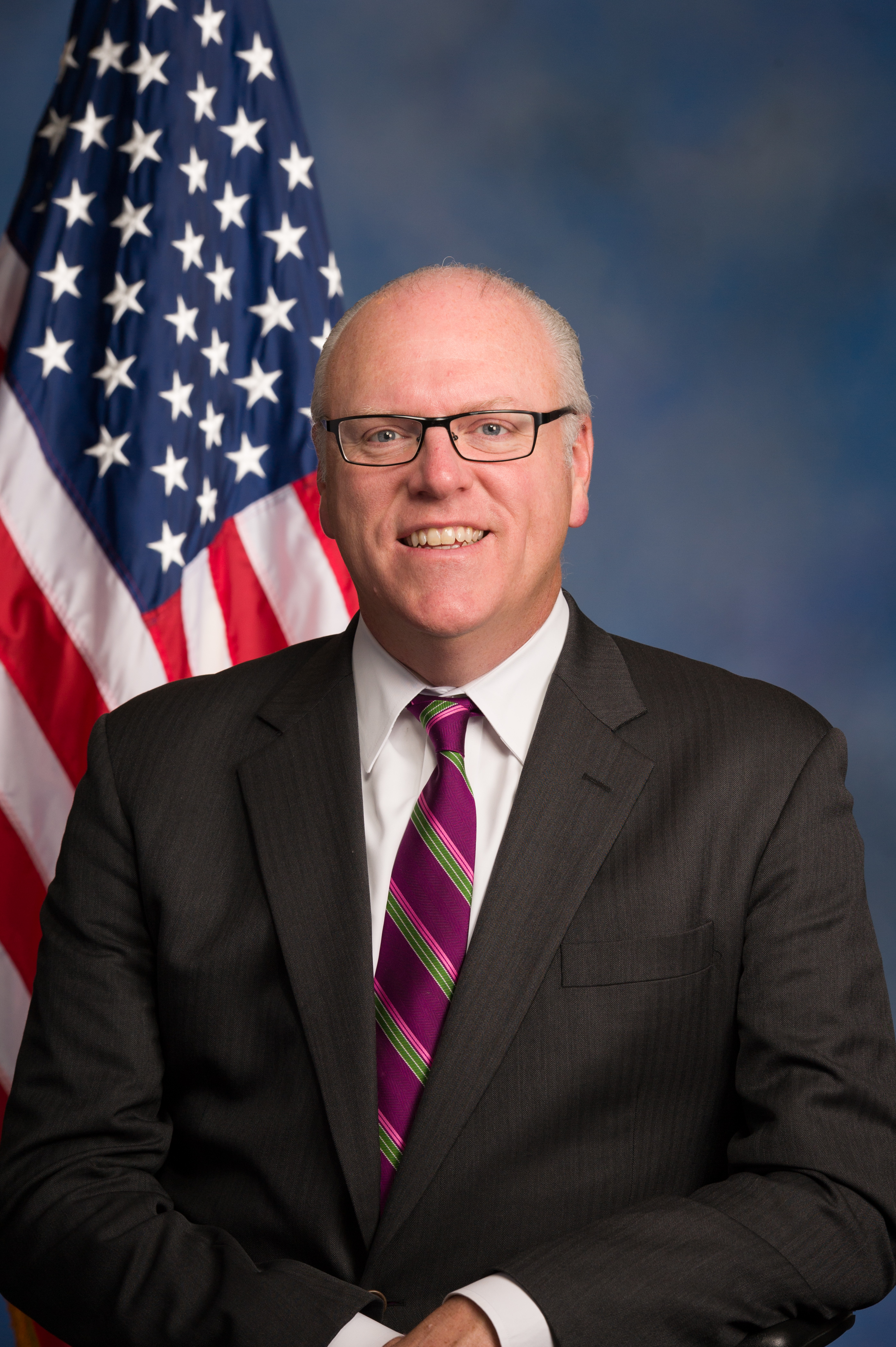
Joe Crowley - US House of Representatives ('85)

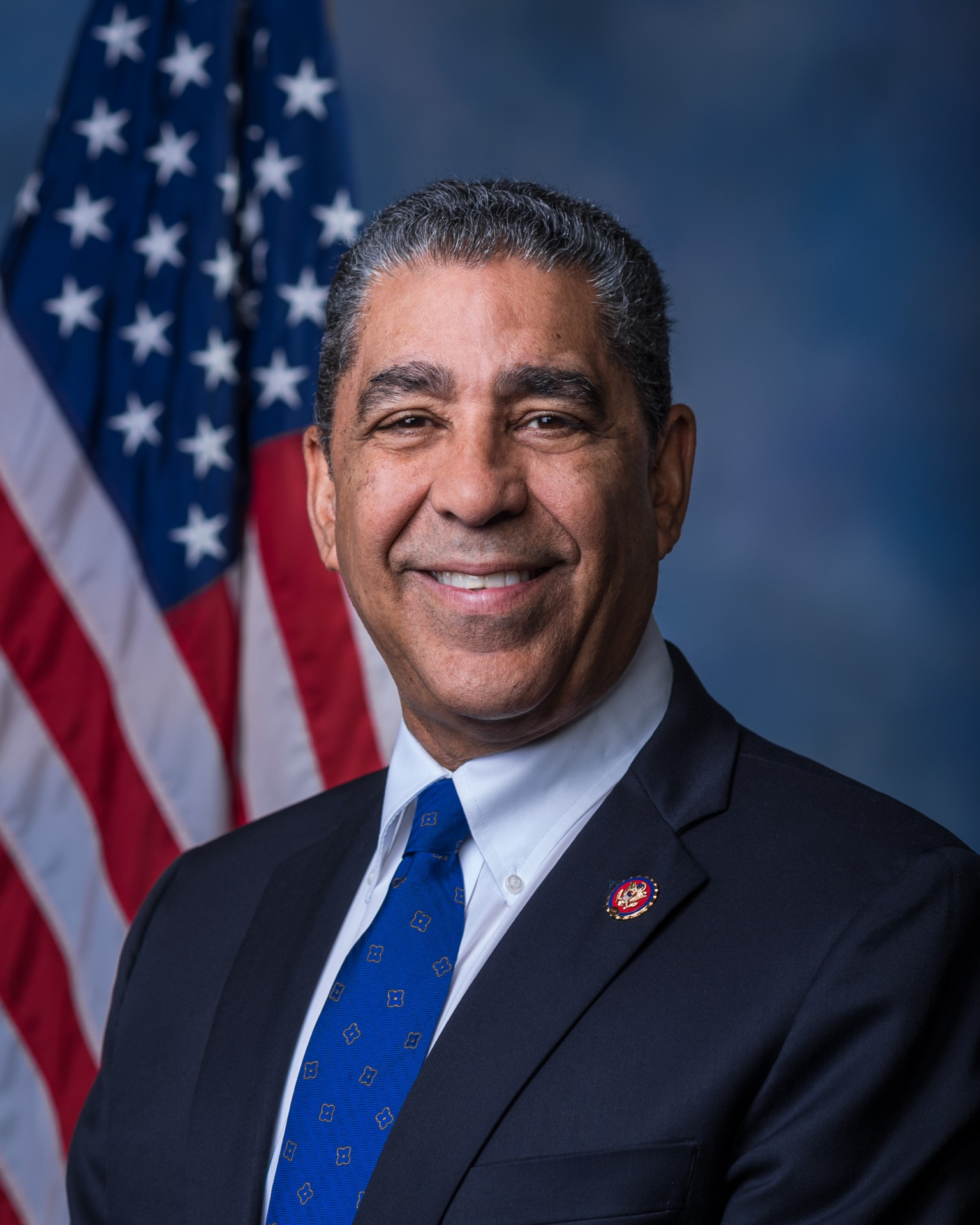
Adriano Espaillat - US House of Representatives ('78)

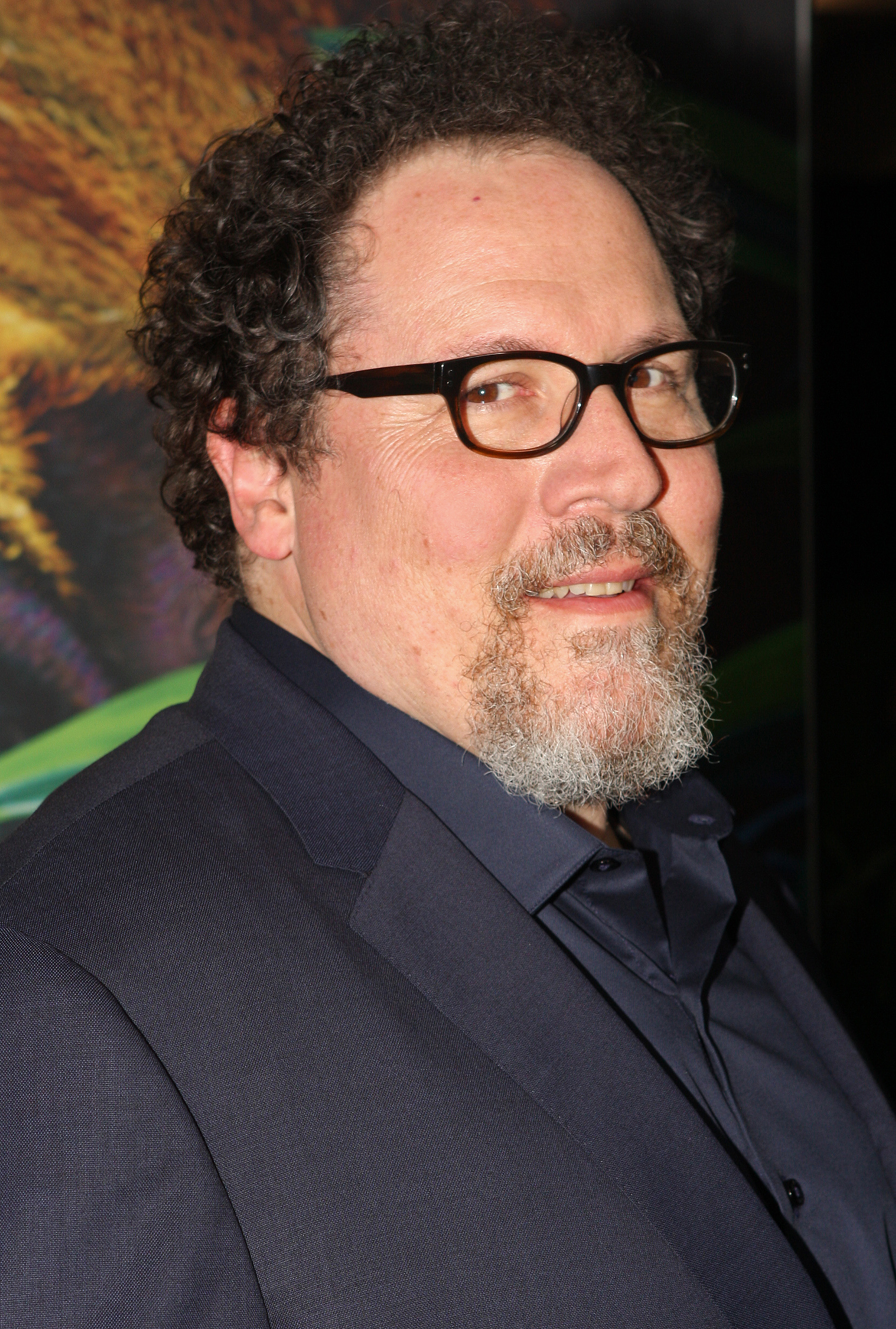
Jon Favreau – actor and filmmaker, director of Marvel movies such as Iron Man & Star Wars The Mandalorian show

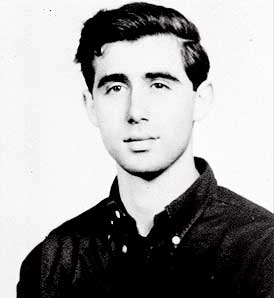
Andrew Goodman – civil rights activist who was a victim in the murders of Chaney, Goodman, and Schwerner in 1964

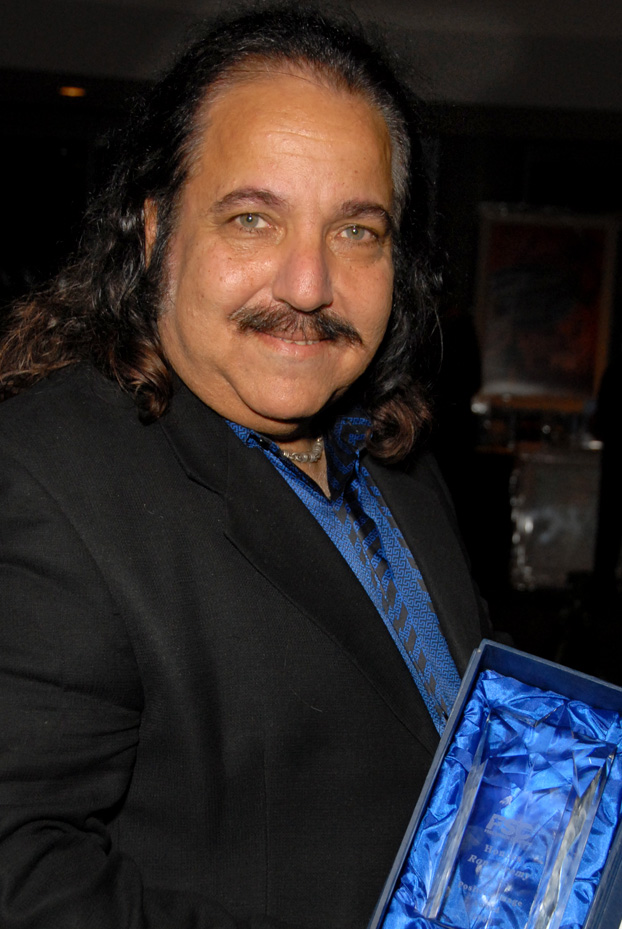
Ron Jeremy – prolific pornographic actor and comedian ('74)

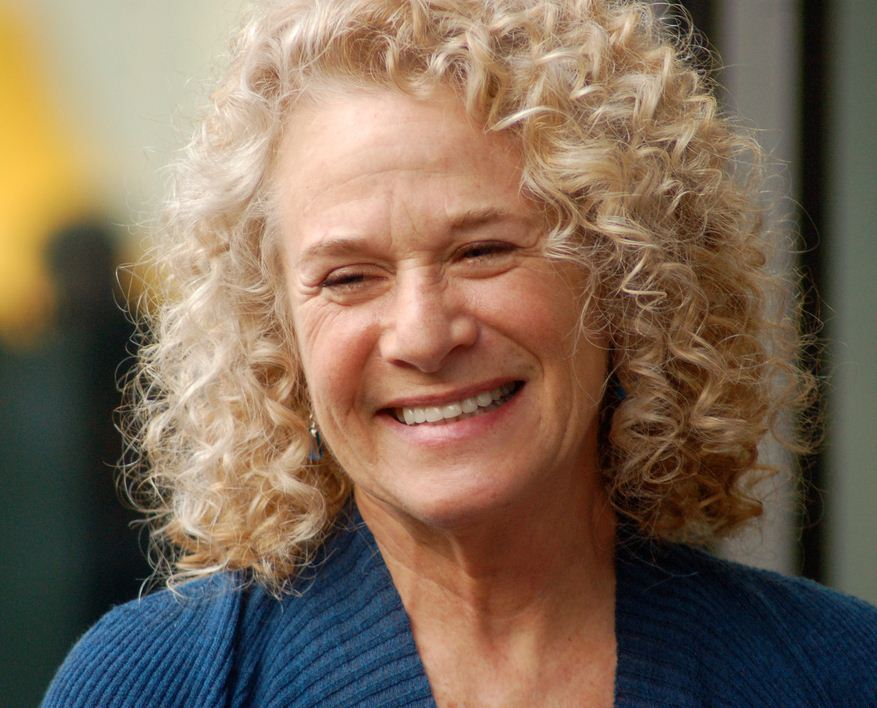
Carole King - composer, singer and songwriter

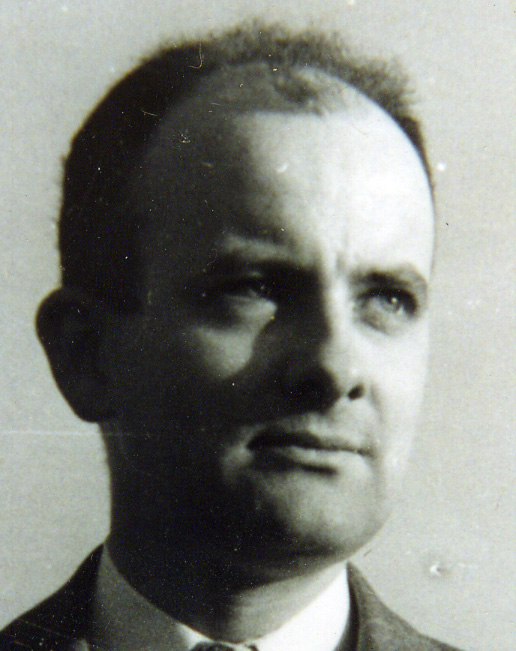
Edwin Moise – mathematician and mathematics education reformer (faculty)

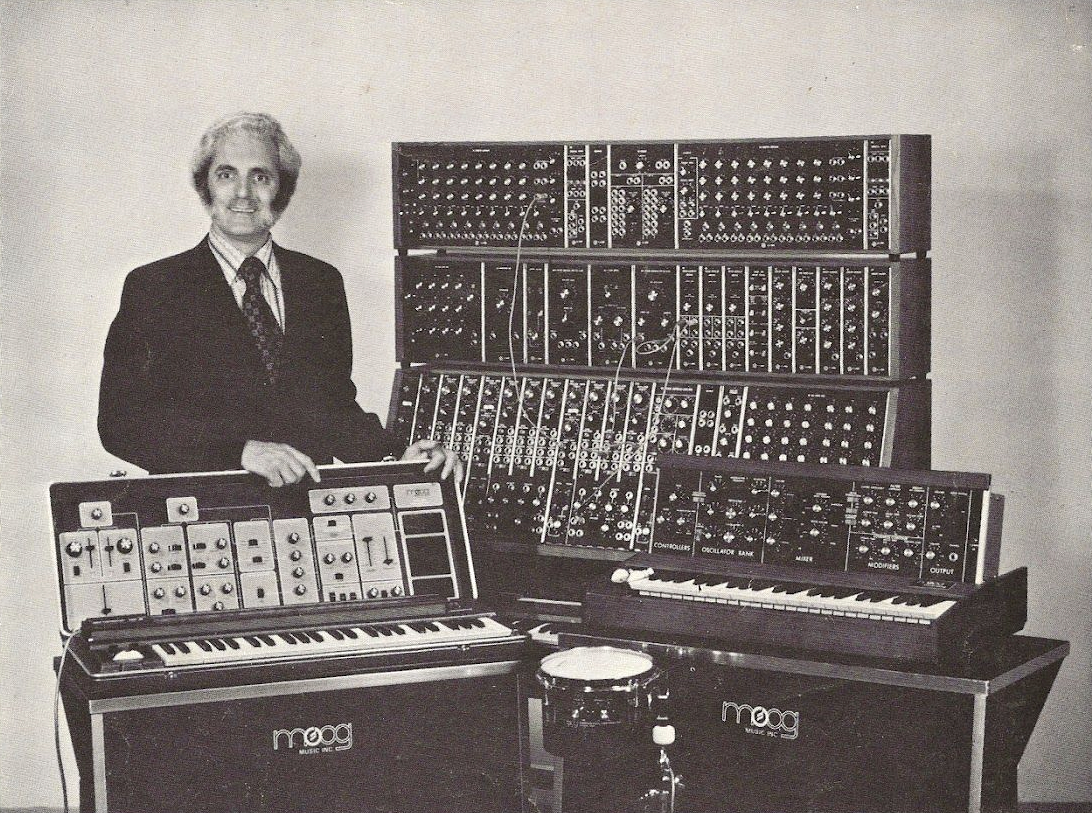
Robert Moog – inventor of the Moog synthesizer ('57)

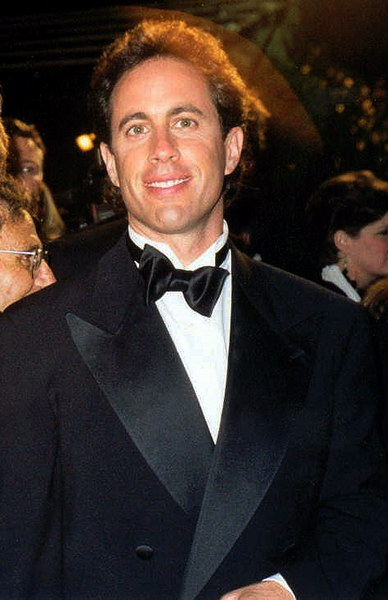
Jerry Seinfeld – actor and comedian ('76)

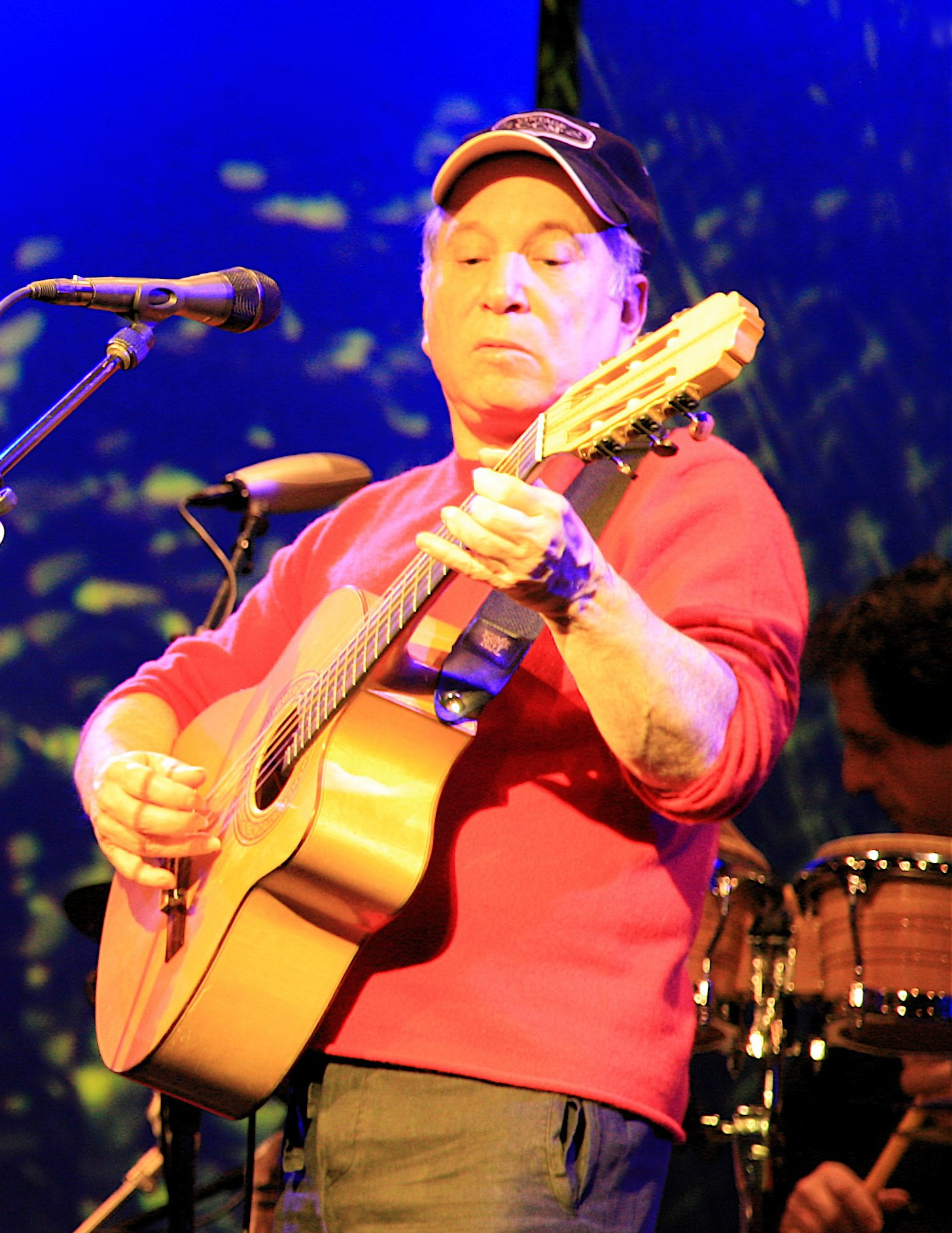
Paul Simon – musician, Simon and Garfunkel ('63)

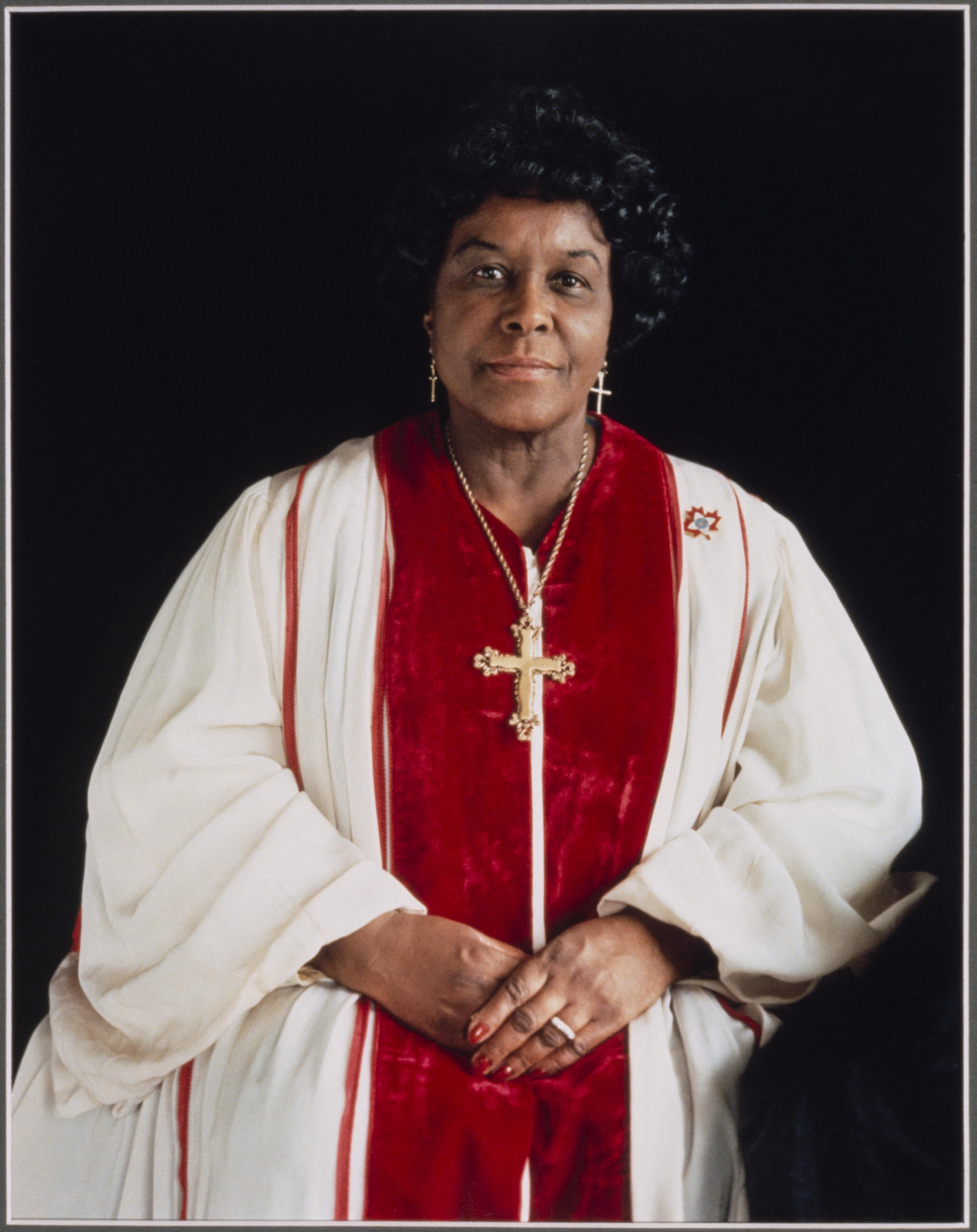
Deborah Wolfe – educator (faculty)

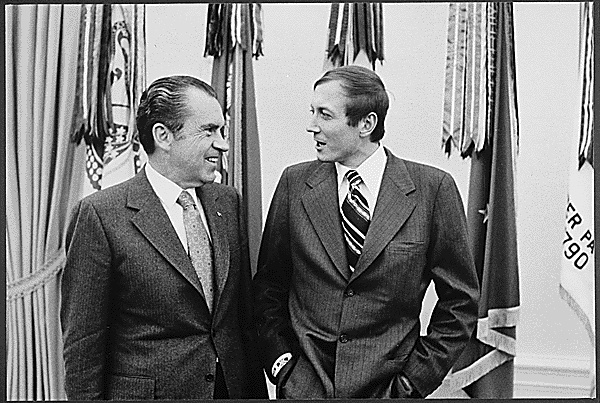
Yevgeny Yevtushenko – Russian poet (faculty)

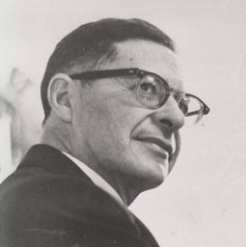
Ben-Zion Bokser – prominent rabbi and professor of Political Science (faculty)

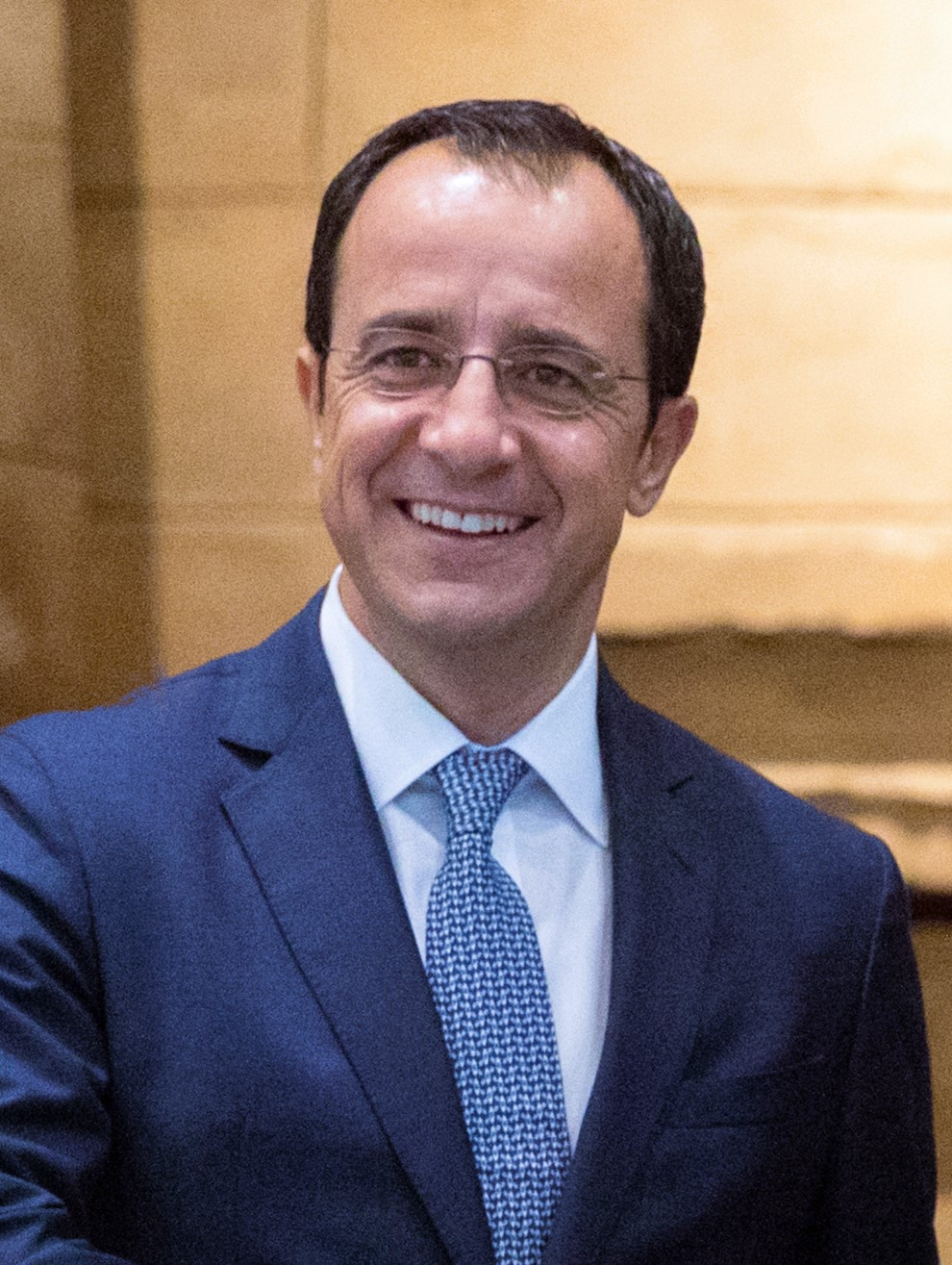
Nikos Christodoulides – president of Cyprus (2023–present)
