= Chris Rock filmography =

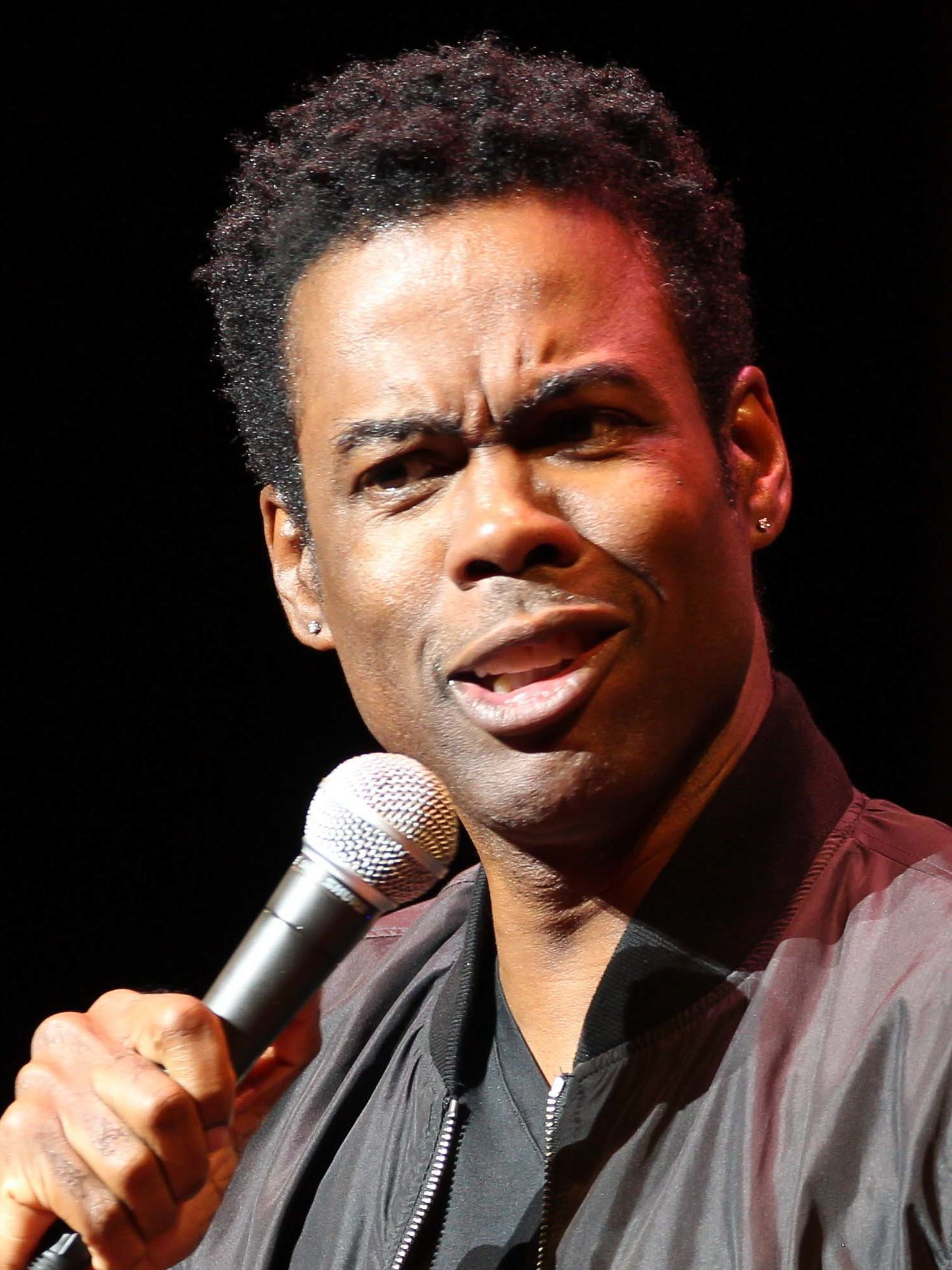
- Rock in 2017
- Film: 47
- Television series: 44
- Documentary: 8
- Music videos: 6
- Theatre: 1

The following is the filmography of American stand-up comedian and actor Chris Rock.

Rock started his career as a cast member on Saturday Night Live from 1990 to 1993 alongside Adam Sandler, David Spade, and Chris Farley. He also starred on In Living Color from 1993 to 1994 and The Chris Rock Show from 1997 to 2000. During this time Rock gained stardom as a stand-up comedian releasing several comedy albums including Born Suspect (1991), Roll with the New (1997), and Bigger & Blacker (1999). He started his film career with minor film roles such as Beverly Hills Cop II (1987) before appearing in Lethal Weapon 4 (1998), Dogma (1999), and Nurse Betty (2000).

In 2001, Rock wrote, executive produced and starred in Down to Earth (2001), and starred in and produced Pootie Tang (2001). For both of these projects he collaborated with Louis C.K. In 2003, he made his directorial debut with the political satire Head of State (2003), followed by his films as a director I Think I Love My Wife (2007) and Top Five (2014). He also starred in the comedies Death at a Funeral (2010), Grown Ups (2010), its 2013 sequel, and Dolemite Is My Name (2019). He has also appeared in the Netflix films starring Adam Sandler Sandy Wexler (2017) and The Week Of (2018).

Rock has also made appearances in a variety of television shows including Louie (2011–2012), Comedians in Cars Getting Coffee (2013), Broad City (2015), Empire (2015), and Fargo (2020). He also appeared as himself in the documentaries The N-Word (2004), The Aristocrats (2005), and Good Hair (2009). He also is known for his vocal performances as titular protagonist of Osmosis Jones (2001), Marty the Zebra in DreamWorks Animation's Madagascar film franchise (2005–2012) and as Mooseblood in Jerry Seinfeld's Bee Movie (2007).

== Film ==
Year	Title	Role	Notes
1985	Krush Groove	Person Standing Next to Club Phone During Fight	Uncredited
1987	Beverly Hills Cop II	Playboy Mansion Valet	
1988	Comedy's Dirtiest Dozen	Himself	Direct-to-video concert film
1988	I'm Gonna Git You Sucka	Rib Joint Customer	
1989	Who Is Chris Rock?	Himself	Documentary short
1991	New Jack City	Pookie	
1992	Boomerang	Bony T	
1993	CB4	Albert Brown / M.C. Gusto	Also writer and co-producer
1995	The Immortals	Deke Anthony	
1995	Panther	Yuck Mouth	
1996	Sgt. Bilko	1st Lt. Oster	
1997	Beverly Hills Ninja	Joey Washington	
1998	Dr. Dolittle	Rodney	Voice
1998	Lethal Weapon 4	Detective Lee Butters	
1999	Torrance Rises	Himself	Documentary short
1999	Dogma	Rufus	
1999	Jackie's Back	Himself	Documentary; cameo
2000	Nurse Betty	Wesley	
2001	Down to Earth	Lance Barton	Also writer and executive producer
2001	A.I. Artificial Intelligence	Mecha Comedian	Voice; cameo
2001	Pootie Tang	JB / Radio DJ / Pootie's Father	Also producer
2001	Osmosis Jones	Osmosis Jones	Voice
2001	Jay and Silent Bob Strike Back	Chaka Luther King	
2002	Bad Company	Jake Hayes / Kevin Pope / Michael Turner	
2002	Comedian	Himself	Documentary
2003	Pauly Shore Is Dead	Himself	Cameo
2003	Head of State	Mays Gilliam	Also director, producer and writer
2004	The N-Word	Himself	Documentary
2004	Paparazzi	Pizza Delivery Guy	Cameo
2005	The Aristocrats	Himself	Documentary
2005	Madagascar	Marty	Voice
2005	The Longest Yard	James "Caretaker" Farrell	
2007	I Think I Love My Wife	Richard Marcus Cooper	Also director, producer and writer
2007	Mr. Warmth: The Don Rickles Project	Himself	Documentary
2007	Bee Movie	Mooseblood the Mosquito	Voice
2008	You Don't Mess with the Zohan	Taxi Driver	Cameo
2008	Madagascar: Escape 2 Africa	Marty and other zebras	Voice
2009	Good Hair	Himself	Documentary; also producer
2009	Why We Laugh: Black Comedians on Black Comedy	Himself	Documentary
2010	Death at a Funeral	Aaron	Also producer
2010	Grown Ups	Kurt McKenzie	
2012	2 Days in New York	Mingus Robinson	
2012	What to Expect When You're Expecting	Vic	
2012	Madagascar 3: Europe's Most Wanted	Marty	Voice
2013	Madly Madagascar	Marty	Voice; short film
2013	Grown Ups 2	Kurt McKenzie	
2014	Top Five	Andre Allen	Also director and writer
2015	A Very Murray Christmas	Himself	
2017	Sandy Wexler	Himself	
2018	The Week Of	Kirby Cordice	
2018	Nobody's Fool	Lawrence	Cameo
2019	Dolemite Is My Name	Bobby Vale	
2020	The Witches	Older Hero Mouse / Narrator	Voice
2021	Bad Trip	Cop	Deleted scene
2021	Spiral	Detective Zeke Banks	Also executive producer
2021	The One and Only Dick Gregory	Himself	Documentary
2022	Amsterdam	Milton King	
2023	Paw Patrol: The Mighty Movie	Cat Rubble	Voice; cameo
2023	Rustin	Roy Wilkins	
2025	Being Eddie	Himself	Documentary
2026	Lorne	Himself	Documentary
2026	Misty Green	Jordan	Also director, producer and writer
TBA	Grown Ups 3 †	Kurt McKenzie	Filming

== Television ==
Year	Title	Role	Notes
1987	Miami Vice	Carson	Episode: "Missing Hours"
1990–1993	Saturday Night Live	Various	59 episodes
1993–1994	In Living Color	Various	6 episodes
1994	HBO Comedy Half-Hour	Himself	Stand-up comedy special
1995	The Fresh Prince of Bel-Air	Maurice / Jasmine	Episode: "Get a Job"
1996–1998	The Moxy Show	Flea	Voice; uncredited
1996	Martin	Valentino Watson	Episode: "The Love Jones Connection"
1996	Homicide: Life on the Street	Carver	Episode: "Requiem for Adena"
1996	1996 Billboard Music Awards	Himself	Host; television special
1996	Chris Rock: Bring the Pain	Himself	Stand-up comedy special
1996	Politically Incorrect	Himself	Guest star; commentator for 1996 United States presidential election
1996–2024	Saturday Night Live	Himself	Host; 4 episodes
1997	1997 MTV Video Music Awards	Himself	Host; television special
1997	Happily Ever After: Fairy Tales for Every Child	Woody	Voice; episode: "Pinocchio"
1997–2000	The Chris Rock Show	Himself	Host (37 episodes); also creator, writer and executive producer
1997–2004	Howard Stern	Himself	6 episodes; guest star
1998	King of the Hill	Roger "Booda" Sack	Voice; episode: "Traffic Jam"
1998	Mr. Show with Bob and David	Himself	Episode: "Eat Rotten Fruit from a Shitty Tree"
1999	Chris Rock: Bigger & Blacker	Himself	Stand-up comedy special
1999	1999 MTV Video Music Awards	Himself	Host; television special
2000	DAG	Himself	Episode: "Pilot"
2003	2003 MTV Video Music Awards	Himself	Host; television special
2003	The Bernie Mac Show	Himself	Episode: "Pink Gold"
2004	Chris Rock: Never Scared	Himself	Stand-up comedy special
2005	77th Academy Awards	Himself	Host; television special
2005–2009	Everybody Hates Chris	Narrator (Himself) / Mr. Abbott	88 episodes; also creator, writer and executive producer
2008	Chris Rock: Kill the Messenger	Himself	Stand-up comedy special
2009	Merry Madagascar	Marty	Voice; television special
2011–2012	Louie	Himself	2 episodes
2012	Tosh.0	Himself	Episode: "How to Draw Guy"
2013	A.N.T. Farm	Himself	Episode: "Animal HusbANTry"
2013	Real Husbands of Hollywood	Himself	Episode: "Rock, Paper, Stealers"
2013	Comedians in Cars Getting Coffee	Himself	Episode: "Kids Need Bullying"
2014	BET Awards 2014	Himself	Host; television special
2015	Broad City	Himself	Voice; episode: "Mochalatta Chills"
2015	Empire	Frank Gathers	Episode: "The Devils Are Here"
2015	The Jim Gaffigan Show	Himself	Episode: "The Bible Story"
2015	Amy Schumer: Live at the Apollo	none	Stand-up comedy special; director
2015	The Eric Andre Show	Himself	Episode: "Bird Up!"
2016	88th Academy Awards	Himself	Host; television special
2018	Chris Rock: Tamborine	Himself	Stand-up comedy special
2018	Kevin Can Wait	Dennis	Episode: "A Band Done"
2020	Fargo	Loy Cannon	10 episodes
2020	The Comedy Store	Himself	Documentary miniseries
2022	94th Academy Awards	Himself	Presenter of Best Documentary Feature award; further information: Chris Rock–Will Smith slapping incident
2023	Chris Rock: Selective Outrage	Himself	Livestreamed stand-up comedy special
2024–2025	Everybody Still Hates Chris	Narrator (Himself) / Pookie	Voice; also executive producer
2025	The Simpsons	Himself	Episode: "Abe League of Their Moe"

As executive producer

Year	Title	Notes
1998–2002	The Hughleys	89 episodes
2012–2013	Totally Biased with W. Kamau Bell	64 episodes
2017–2018	The Rundown with Robin Thede	24 episodes

== Music videos ==
Year	Title	Role	Artist
1989	"Turn It Out (Go Base)"	Award Presenter	Rob Base
1989	"Smooth Operator"	Himself	Big Daddy Kane
1997	"Champagne"	Himself	Chris Rock
1999	"No Sex (In the Champagne Room)" feat. Gerald Levert		Chris Rock
2007	"Hump de Bump"	Himself	Red Hot Chili Peppers; also director
2015	"Bitch I'm Madonna"	Himself	Madonna
2019	"Old Town Road"	Sheriff	Lil Nas X

== Theatre ==
Year	Title	Role	Venue
2011	The Motherfucker with the Hat	Ralph D.	Gerald Schoenfeld Theatre, Broadway

== See also ==
- List of awards and nominations received by Chris Rock
