= List of awards and nominations received by Chris Rock =

Chris Rock awards and nominations
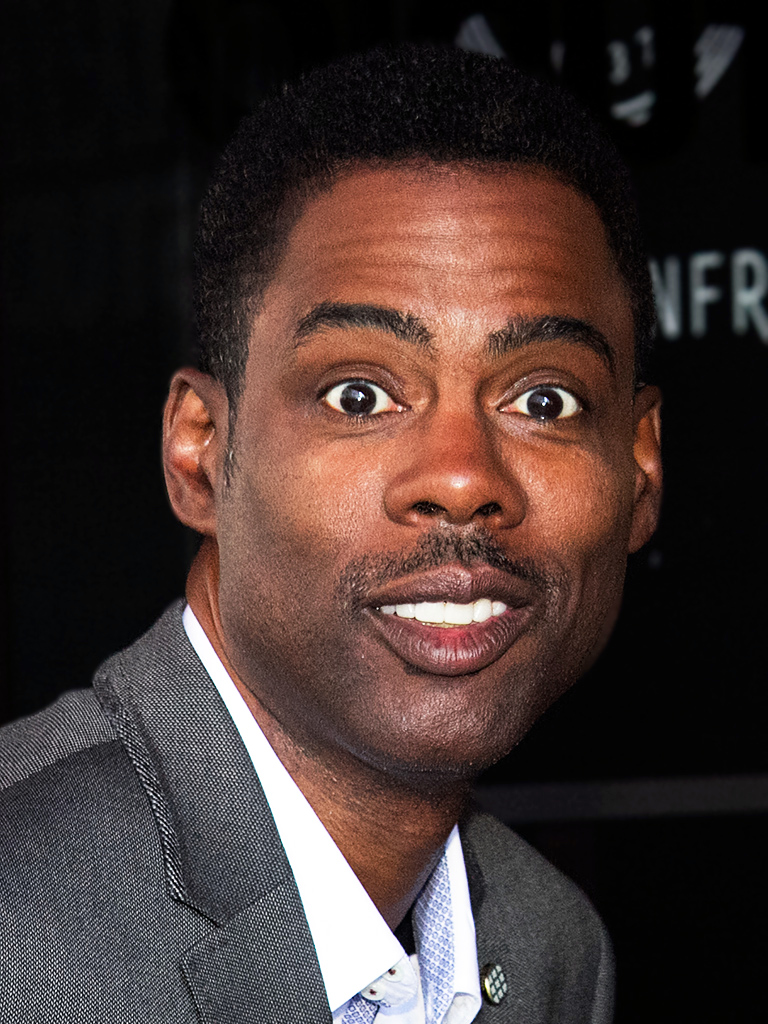
- Rock at the 2014 Toronto International Film Festival
Awards and nominations
Award	Wins	Nominations
Emmy Awards	4	19
Grammy Awards	3	4
Golden Globes	0	2

Totals (Note: Certain award groups do not simply award one winner. They acknowledge several different recipients, have runners-up, and have third place. Since this is a specific recognition and is different from losing an award, runner-up mentions are considered wins in this award tally. For simplification and to avoid errors, each award in this list has been presumed to have had a prior nomination.)
- Wins: 7
- Nominations: 25

This article is a List of awards and nominations received by Chris Rock.

Chris Rock is an American stand-up comedian, actor, writer, producer, and film director. Over his career he has received several awards including four Primetime Emmy Awards and three Grammy Awards as well as nominations for two Golden Globe Awards.

For his work on television, Rock received two Primetime Emmy Awards for Outstanding Variety Special and Outstanding Writing for a Variety Special for his HBO comedy special Chris Rock: Bring the Pain (1997). He created and hosted his own talk for HBO, The Chris Rock Show which ran from 1997 to 2001 and won the Primetime Emmy Award for Outstanding Writing for a Variety Series in 1999. He won the same award for his HBO comedy special Chris Rock: Kill the Messenger (2008). He was Emmy-nominated for his specials, Bigger & Blacker (1999), Never Scared (2004), and Selective Outrage (2023). He hosted the Academy Awards twice, the 76th Academy Awards in 2005 and the 88th Academy Awards in 2016, the later of which earned a nomination for the Primetime Emmy Award for Outstanding Variety Special (Live).

Rock created the semi-autobiographical sitcom Everybody Hates Chris (2005–2009) for which he was nominated for the Golden Globe Award for Best Television Series – Musical or Comedy. He received three Grammy Awards for Best Comedy Album for Roll with the New (1998), Bigger & Blacker (1999), and Never Scared (2004). He was Grammy-nominated for his Netflix specials Tamborine (2018), and Selective Outrage (2023). For the later he was nominated for the Best Performance in Stand-Up Comedy on Television.

== Main awards ==
=== Emmy Awards ===
Year	Category	Nominated work	Result	Ref.
Primetime Emmy Awards
1997	Outstanding Variety, Music, or Comedy Special	Chris Rock: Bring the Pain	Won	
1997	Outstanding Writing for a Variety or Music Program	Chris Rock: Bring the Pain	Won	
1997	Outstanding Writing for a Variety or Music Program	Politically Incorrect	Nominated	
1998	Outstanding Writing for a Variety or Music Program	The Chris Rock Show	Nominated	
1999	Outstanding Writing for a Variety or Music Program	The Chris Rock Show	Won	
1999	Outstanding Performance in a Variety or Music Program	The Chris Rock Show	Nominated	
2000	Outstanding Variety, Music or Comedy Series	The Chris Rock Show	Nominated	
2000	Outstanding Variety, Music or Comedy Special	Chris Rock: Bigger & Blacker	Nominated	
2000	Outstanding Individual Performance in a Variety or Music Program	Chris Rock: Bigger & Blacker	Nominated	
2000	Outstanding Writing for a Variety, Music or Comedy Program	Chris Rock: Bigger & Blacker	Nominated	
2000	Outstanding Writing for a Variety, Music or Comedy Program	The Chris Rock Show	Nominated	
2001	Outstanding Variety, Music or Comedy Series	The Chris Rock Show	Nominated	
2001	Outstanding Writing for a Variety, Music or Comedy Program	The Chris Rock Show	Nominated	
2004	Outstanding Variety, Music or Comedy Special	Chris Rock: Never Scared	Nominated	
2004	Outstanding Writing for a Variety, Music or Comedy Program	Chris Rock: Never Scared	Nominated	
2009	Outstanding Variety, Music or Comedy Special	Chris Rock: Kill the Messenger	Nominated	
2009	Outstanding Writing for a Variety, Music or Comedy Program	Chris Rock: Kill the Messenger	Won	
2016	Outstanding Special Class Program	88th Academy Awards	Nominated	
2016	Outstanding Directing for a Variety Special	Amy Schumer: Live at the Apollo	Nominated	
2023	Outstanding Variety Special (Live)	Chris Rock: Selective Outrage	Nominated	
2023	Outstanding Writing for a Variety Special	Chris Rock: Selective Outrage	Nominated	

=== Golden Globe Awards ===
Year	Category	Nominated work	Result	Ref.
2006	Best Television Series – Musical or Comedy	Everybody Hates Chris	Nominated	
2024	Best Performance in Stand-Up Comedy on Television	Chris Rock: Selective Outrage	Nominated	

=== Grammy Awards ===
Year	Category	Nominated work	Result	Ref.
1998	Best Comedy Album	Chris Rock: Roll with the New	Won	
2000	Best Comedy Album	Chris Rock: Bigger & Blacker	Won	
2006	Best Comedy Album	Chris Rock: Never Scared	Won	
2019	Best Comedy Album	Chris Rock: Tamborine	Nominated	
2023	Best Comedy Album	Chris Rock: Selective Outrage	Nominated	

== Miscellaneous awards ==
Organizations	Year	Category	Work	Result	Ref.
American Comedy Awards	1999	Funniest Supporting Actor - Motion Picture	Lethal Weapon 4	Nominated	
American Comedy Awards	1999	Funniest Actor in a TV Series	The Chris Rock Show	Nominated	
American Comedy Awards	1999	Funniest Actor in a TV Special	Comic Relief VIII	Nominated	
American Comedy Awards	2000	Funniest Actor in a TV Series	The Chris Rock Show	Nominated	
American Comedy Awards	2000	Funniest Actor in a TV Special	Chris Rock: Bigger & Blacker	Won	
AFI Awards	2007	Top TV Program of the Year	Everybody Hates Chris	Won	
BET Awards	2004	Outstanding Directing for a Box Office Movie	Head of State	Nominated	
BET Awards	2004	Outstanding Directing for a Box Office Movie	Head of State	Nominated	
BET Awards	2004	Outstanding Lead Actor in a Box Office Movie	Head of State	Nominated	
BET Awards	2005	Best Performance in an Animated Theatrical Film	Madagascar	Nominated	
BET Awards	2005	Outstanding Supporting Actor in a Theatrical Film	The Longest Yard	Won	
BET Awards	2011	Best Movie	Death at a Funeral	Nominated	
Black Reel Awards	2001	Best Supporting Actor	Nurse Betty	Nominated	
Black Reel Awards	2004	Best Screenplay (Original or Adapted)	Head of State	Nominated	
Black Reel Awards	2013	Best Actor	2 Days in New York	Nominated	
Black Reel Awards	2013	Best Voice Performance	Madagascar 3: Europe's Most Wanted	Nominated	
Black Reel Awards	2015	Best Actor	Top Five	Nominated	
Black Reel Awards	2015	Best Director	Top Five	Nominated	
Black Reel Awards	2015	Best Screenplay (Original or Adapted)	Top Five	Won	
Blockbuster Entertainment Awards	1999	Favorite Supporting Actor - Action/Adventure	Lethal Weapon 4	Won	
British Comedy Awards	2006	Best International Comedy TV Show	Everybody Hates Chris	Won	
CableACE Awards	1995	Best Stand-Up Comedy Special	HBO Comedy Half-Hour	Won	
CableACE Awards	1997	Best Variety Special or Series	The Chris Rock Show	Won	
CableACE Awards	1997	Best Entertainment Host	The Chris Rock Show	Won	
Critics' Choice Movie Awards	2015	Best Actor in a Comedy	Top Five	Nominated	
Critics' Choice Television Awards	2021	Best Actor in a Limited Series or TV Movie	Fargo	Nominated	
Directors Guild of America Awards	2016	Outstanding - Variety Specials	Amy Schumer: Live at the Apollo	Nominated	
Drama League Awards	2011	Distinguished Performance	The Motherfucker with the Hat	Nominated	
Environmental Media Awards	2008	Episodic Comedy	Everybody Hates Chris	Won	
Golden Raspberry Awards	2013	Worst Screen Combo	Grown Ups 2	Nominated	
Gotham Awards	2009	Best Documentary	Good Hair	Nominated	
Hollywood Critics Association TV Awards	2021	Best Actor in a Limited Series or Television Movie	Fargo	Nominated	
Hollywood Film Awards	2014	Hollywood Comedy Film Award	Top Five	Won	
MTV Movie Awards	1999	Best Breakthrough Male Performance	Lethal Weapon 4	Nominated	
MTV Movie Awards	1999	Best Comedic Performance	Lethal Weapon 4	Nominated	
MTV Movie Awards	2015	Best Comedic Performance	Top Five	Nominated	
NAACP Image Awards	1997	Outstanding Variety – Series or Special	Chris Rock: Bring the Pain	Nominated	
NAACP Image Awards	1998	Outstanding Variety – Series or Special	The Chris Rock Show	Nominated	
NAACP Image Awards	1998	Outstanding Performance in a Variety Series/Special	The Chris Rock Show	Nominated	
NAACP Image Awards	1998	Outstanding Performance in a Children's Special	Happily Ever After: Fairy Tales for Every Child	Nominated	
NAACP Image Awards	1999	Outstanding Variety – Series or Special	The Chris Rock Show	Nominated	
NAACP Image Awards	1999	Outstanding Performance in a Variety Series/Special	The Chris Rock Show	Nominated	
NAACP Image Awards	1999	Outstanding Supporting Actor in a Motion Picture	Lethal Weapon 4	Nominated	
NAACP Image Awards	2000	Outstanding Variety – Series or Special	Chris Rock: Bigger & Blacker	Nominated	
NAACP Image Awards	2000	Outstanding Performance in a Variety Series/Special	Chris Rock: Bigger & Blacker	Nominated	
NAACP Image Awards	2000	Outstanding Comedy Series	The Hughleys	Nominated	
NAACP Image Awards	2001	Outstanding Variety – Series or Special	The Chris Rock Show	Nominated	
NAACP Image Awards	2001	Outstanding Performance in a Variety Series/Special	The Chris Rock Show	Nominated	
NAACP Image Awards	2001	Outstanding Comedy Series	The Hughleys	Nominated	
NAACP Image Awards	2002	Outstanding Comedy Series	The Hughleys	Nominated	
NAACP Image Awards	2005	Outstanding Variety (Series or Special)	Chris Rock: Never Scared	Nominated	
NAACP Image Awards	2006	Outstanding Comedy Series	Everybody Hates Chris	Won	
NAACP Image Awards	2007	Outstanding Comedy Series	Everybody Hates Chris	Nominated	
NAACP Image Awards	2008	Outstanding Comedy Series	Everybody Hates Chris	Nominated	
NAACP Image Awards	2009	Outstanding Comedy Series	Everybody Hates Chris	Nominated	
NAACP Image Awards	2009	Outstanding Variety (Series or Special)	Chris Rock: Kill the Messenger	Nominated	
NAACP Image Awards	2010	Outstanding Comedy Series	Everybody Hates Chris	Nominated	
NAACP Image Awards	2010	Outstanding Documentary	Good Hair	Won	
NAACP Image Awards	2013	Outstanding Talk Series)	Totally Biased with W. Kamau Bell	Nominated	
NAACP Image Awards	2015	Outstanding Writing in a Motion Picture	Top Five	Nominated	
NAACP Image Awards	2015	Outstanding Host for a Variety Series	BET Awards 2014	Nominated	
NAACP Image Awards	2015	Entertainer of the Year		Nominated	
NAACP Image Awards	2021	Outstanding Character Voice Performance – Motion Picture	The Witches	Nominated	
NAACP Image Awards	2021	Outstanding Actor in a Television Movie or Limited-Series	Fargo	Nominated	
NAACP Image Awards	2021	Outstanding Guest Actor or Actress in a Television Series	Saturday Night Live	Nominated	
National Board of Review Awards	2014	Spotlight Award	Top Five	Won	
Nickelodeon Kids' Choice Awards	2006	Favorite Voice from an Animated Movie	Madagascar	Won	
Nickelodeon Kids' Choice Awards	2006	Wannabe Award		Won	
Nickelodeon Kids' Choice Awards	2013	Favorite Voice from an Animated Movie	Madagascar 3: Europe's Most Wanted	Nominated	
Palm Springs International Film Festival	2015	Creative Impact in Comedy Award	Top Five	Won	
People's Choice Awards	2006	Favorite Funny Male Star		Nominated	
People's Choice Awards	2006	Favorite On-Screen Match-Up (shared with Adam Sandler)	The Longest Yard	Nominated	
People's Choice Awards	2006	Favorite New Television Comedy	Everybody Hates Chris	Nominated	
People's Choice Awards	2014	Favorite Comedic Movie Actor		Nominated	
Satellite Awards	2006	Best Television Series – Musical or Comedy	Everybody Hates Chris	Nominated	
Satellite Awards	2020	Best Actor in a Miniseries or TV Film	Fargo	Nominated	
St. Louis Gateway Film Critics Association	2010	Best Documentary Feature Film	Good Hair	Nominated	
TCA Awards	2006	Outstanding Achievement in Comedy	Everybody Hates Chris	Nominated	
TCA Awards	2006	Outstanding New Program of the Year	Everybody Hates Chris	Nominated	
Teen Choice Awards	2003	Choice Movie – Comedy	Head of State	Nominated	
Teen Choice Awards	2003	Choice Movie Actor – Comedy	Head of State	Nominated	
Teen Choice Awards	2003	Choice Comedian		Nominated	
Teen Choice Awards	2004	Choice Comedian		Nominated	
Teen Choice Awards	2005	Choice Movie Chemistry (shared with Adam Sandler)	The Longest Yard	Nominated	
Teen Choice Awards	2005	Choice Comedian		Nominated	
Teen Choice Awards	2006	Choice TV – Choice Comedy/Musical Show	Everybody Hates Chris	Nominated	
Teen Choice Awards	2006	Choice TV – Choice Breakout Show	Everybody Hates Chris	Nominated	
Teen Choice Awards	2006	Choice Comedian		Nominated	
Teen Choice Awards	2010	Choice Movie Actor – Comedy	Death at a Funeral	Nominated	
Teen Choice Awards	2012	Choice Movie Actor – Comedy	What to Expect When You're Expecting	Nominated	
Teen Choice Awards	2012	Choice Movie Voice	Madagascar 3: Europe's Most Wanted	Nominated	
Washington D.C. Area Film Critics Association	2010	Best Documentary	Good Hair	Nominated	
Writers Guild of America Awards	2006	Best New Series	Everybody Hates Chris	Nominated	
Writers Guild of America Awards	2010	Best Documentary Screenplay	Good Hair	Nominated	
Writers Guild of America Awards	2017	Comedy/Variety (Music, Awards, Tributes) – Specials	88th Academy Awards	Nominated	
Young Artist Awards	1999	Best Family TV Comedy Series	The Hughleys	Won	
Young Artist Awards	2000	Best Family TV Comedy Series	The Hughleys	Nominated	
Young Artist Awards	2001	Best Family TV Comedy Series	The Hughleys	Nominated	
Young Artist Awards	2006	Best Family Television Series (Comedy)	Everybody Hates Chris	Won	

== Honorary awards ==
Organizations	Year	Notes	Result	Ref.
Hollywood Walk of Fame	2003	Motion Picture Star	Won	
