= NAACP Image Award for Outstanding Variety – Series or Special =

American television award

This article lists the winners and nominees for the NAACP Image Award for Outstanding Variety – Series or Special. Currently An Evening of Stars: Tribute to and Black Girls Rock! hold the record for most wins in this category with three each.

== Winners and nominees ==
Winners are listed first and highlighted in bold.

=== 1980s ===
Year	Series / Special	Ref
1988
1988	**An All-Star Celebration Honoring Martin Luther King, Jr.**	
1989
1989	**It's Showtime at the Apollo**	
1989	Ebony-Jet Showcase	
1989	Robert Townsend and his Partners in Crime: Part 2	
1989	The Debbie Allen Special	

=== 1990s ===
Year	Series / Special	Ref
1990	—N/a	
1991
1991	**It's Showtime at the Apollo**	
1992
1992	**Sammy Davis, Jr. 60th Anniversary Celebration**	
1993
1993	**The Arsenio Hall Show**	
1994 – 95	—N/a	
1996
1996	**The 1995 Essence Awards**	
1996	Aretha Franklin: Going Home	
1996	Oprah Hangs at Q's Jook Joint	
1996	Showtime at the Apollo	
1996	Sinbad's Summer Jam	
1997
1997	**Celebrate the Dream: 50 Years of Ebony Magazine**	
1997	The 1996 Essence Awards	
1997	Centennial Olympic Games: Opening Ceremonies	
1997	Chris Rock: Bring the Pain	
1997	Sinbad's Summer Jam II: '70s Soul Music Festival	
1998
1998	**Sinbad's Summer Jam III: '70s Soul Music Festival**	
1998	The 1997 Essence Awards	
1998	The Chris Rock Show	
1998	MTV Unplugged	
1998	Showtime at the Apollo	
1999
1999	**Sinbad's Summer Jam IV: '70s Soul Music Festival**	
1999	The Chris Rock Show	
1999	Savion Glover – Stomp, Slide & Swing	
1999	Showtime at the Apollo	
1999	The Velvet Rope Tour – Live in Concert	

=== 2000s ===
Year	Series / Special	Ref
2000
2000	**The 1999 Essence Awards**	
2000	Chris Rock: Bigger & Blacker	
2000	D. L. Hughley: Goin' Home	
2000	Great Performances	
2000	Soul Music Festival: Part 5	
2001
2001	**The 2000 Essence Awards**	
2001	BET's 6th Annual Walk of Fame: A Tribute to Luther Vandross	
2001	BET 20th Anniversary Special	
2001	The Chris Rock Show	
2001	MADtv	
2002
2002	**Michael Jackson: 30th Anniversary Celebration**	
2002	The 2001 Essence Awards	
2002	Access Granted	
2002	BET Testimony	
2002	VH1 Divas Live: The One and Only Aretha Franklin	
2003
2003	**BET's 8th Annual Walk of Fame: A Tribute to Stevie Wonder**	
2003	The 2002 Essence Awards	
2003	Behind the Music	
2003	Cedric the Entertainer Presents	
2003	Def Poetry Jam	
2004
2004	**The 2003 Essence Awards**	
2004	BET Awards 2003	
2004	The 11th Annual Trumpet Awards	
2004	Chappelle's Show	
2004	Def Poetry Jam	
2005
2005	**Genius: A Night for Ray Charles**	
2005	American Idol	
2005	Chris Rock: Never Scared	
2005	Dave Chappelle: For What It's Worth	
2005	Def Poetry Jam	
2006
2006	**BET Awards 2005**	
2006	The 77th Annual Academy Awards	
2006	The Black Movie Awards	
2006	Def Poetry Jam	
2006	Mo'Nique's Fat Chance	
2007
2007	**An Evening of Stars: Tribute to Stevie Wonder**	
2007	The 2006 Black Movie Awards	
2007	BET Awards 2006	
2007	Cedric the Entertainer: Taking You Higher	
2007	Jamie Foxx: Unpredictable	
2008
2008	**Celebration of Gospel '07**	
2008	4th Annual VH1 Hip-Hop Honors	
2008	BET Awards 2007	
2008	An Evening of Stars: Tribute to Aretha Franklin	
2008	Def Poetry Jam	
2009
2009	**An Evening of Stars: Tribute to Smokey Robinson**	
2009	BET Awards 2008	
2009	American Idol	
2009	Chris Rock: Kill the Messenger	
2009	Def Poetry Jam	

=== 2010s ===
Year	Series / Special	Ref
2010
2010	**Michael Jackson Memorial**	
2010	BET Awards 2009	
2010	The Mark Twain Prize: Bill Cosby	
2010	Wanda Sykes: I'ma Be Me	
2010	We Are One: The Obama Inaugural Celebration at the Lincoln Memorial	
2011
2011	**An Evening of Stars: Tribute to Lionel Richie**	
2011	The BET Honors 2010	
2011	Beyoncé: I Am... World Tour	
2011	Black Girls Rock!	
2011	TV One Night Only: Live from the Essence Music Festival	
2012
2012	**Oprah Presents: Master Class**	
2012	BET Awards 2011	
2012	An Evening of Stars: Tribute to Chaka Khan	
2012	Black Girls Rock!	
2012	Prince! Behind the Symbol	
2013
2013	**Black Girls Rock!**	
2013	The First Graduating Class: Oprah Winfrey Leadership Academy for Girls	
2013	Oprah's Master Class	
2013	Oprah and the Legendary Cast of 'Roots' 35 Years Later	
2013	Verses & Flow	
2014
2014	**Black Girls Rock!**	
2014	12 Years a Slave: A TV One Special with Cathy Hughes	
2014	Key & Peele	
2014	Mike Tyson: Undisputed Truth	
2014	Oprah's Master Class	
2015
2015	**Oprah's Master Class**	
2015	BET Awards 2014	
2015	Family Feud	
2015	On the Run Tour: Beyoncé and Jay Z	
2015	UNCF An Evening of Stars	
2016
2016	**Family Feud**	
2016	Black Girls Rock!	
2016	The Daily Show with Trevor Noah	
2016	The Nightly Show with Larry Wilmore	
2016	Oprah's Master Class	
2017
2017	**Black Girls Rock!**	
2017	Celebrity Family Feud	
2017	The Essence Black Women in Hollywood Awards 2016	
2017	Beyoncé: Lemonade	
2017	Lip Sync Battle	
2018
2018	**Lip Sync Battle**	
2018	Black Girls Rock!	
2018	Dave Chappelle: The Age of Spin & Deep in the Heart of Texas	
2018	Def Comedy Jam 25	
2018	Saturday Night Live	
2019
2019	**Black Girls Rock!**	
2019	2 Dope Queens	
2019	Bruno Mars: 24K Magic Live at the Apollo	
2019	Saturday Night Live	
2019	Trevor Noah: Son of Patricia	

=== 2020s ===
Year	Series / Special	Ref
2020
2020	**Homecoming: A Film by Beyoncé**	
2020	Dave Chappelle: Sticks & Stones	
2020	Black Girls Rock!	
2020	Saturday Night Live	
2020	Wanda Sykes: Not Normal	
2021
2021	**Verzuz**	
2021	8:46	
2021	Black Is King	
2021	The Fresh Prince of Bel-Air Reunion	
2021	Yvonne Orji: Mommma I Made It!	

== Multiple wins and nominations ==
=== Wins ===
3 wins

- An Evening of Stars: Tribute to
- Black Girls Rock!

2 wins

- It's Showtime at the Apollo
- Oprah's Master Class

=== Nominations ===
6 nominations

- Def Poetry Jam

5 nominations

- An Evening of Stars: Tribute to
- Black Girls Rock!
- Oprah's Master Class
- Showtime at the Apollo

4 nominations

- Sinbad's Summer Jam

3 nominations

- The Chris Rock Show
- Saturday Night Live

2 nominations

- American Idol
- BET's Annual Walk of Fame
- Family Feud
