= Nigga =

African-American colloquial term

Nigga (/ˈnɪɡə/), also known as "the N-word", is a colloquial term in African-American Vernacular English that is considered vulgar in most contexts of its use. It began as a dialect form of the word nigger, an ethnic slur against black people. As a result of reappropriation, today the word is used mostly by African-Americans in a largely non-pejorative sense as a slang term referring to another person or to themselves, often in a neutral or friendly way. The word is commonly associated and prevalent with hip hop culture, especially that of gangsta rap, G-funk, and the broader West Coast hip hop. The word is more often applied to men, with more select terms being used for women in the culture.

In dialects of English that have non-rhotic speech (including standard British English), the hard-r nigger and nigga are usually (Note: Pronunciation between nigger and nigga may be different – for some non-rhotic speakers – when linking r appears. For others, the phrases nigger is and nigga is are homophonous as [nɪɡə (ʔ)ɪz] or, in dialects with intrusive r, [nɪɡər ɪz] (heard as nigger is by speakers of rhotic accents).) pronounced the same.

== Usage ==
The use of nigger non-pejoratively within the black community was documented in the 1912 novel The Autobiography of an Ex-Colored Man by African-American writer James Weldon Johnson, in which he recounted a scene in New York City around the turn of the century:

I noticed that among this class of colored men the word "nigger" was freely used in about the same sense as the word "fellow," and sometimes as a term of almost endearment; but I soon learned that its use was positively and absolutely prohibited to white men.

There is conflicting popular opinion on whether there is any meaningful difference between nigga and nigger as a spoken term. Many people consider the terms to be equally pejorative, and the use of nigga both in and outside black communities remains controversial. H. Lewis Smith, author of Bury That Sucka: A Scandalous Love Affair with the N-word, believes that "replacing the 'er' with an 'a' changes nothing other than the pronunciation" and the African American Registry notes, "Brother (Brotha) and Sister (Sistah or Sista) are terms of endearment. Nigger was and still is a word of disrespect." The National Association for the Advancement of Colored People, a civil rights group, condemns the use of both nigga and nigger.

Many African-Americans consider nigga only offensive when used by people of another race, with some seeing its use outside a defined social group as an unwelcome cultural appropriation. Used by black people, the term may indicate "solidarity or affection", similar to the usage of the words dude, homeboy, and bro. Some consider nigga non-offensive except when directed from a non-African-American towards an African-American. Yet others have derided this as hypocritical and harmful, enabling white racists to use the word and confusing the issue over nigger. Conversely, nigga has been used an example of cultural assimilation, whereby some members of other ethnicities (particularly younger people) will use the word in a positive way, similar to the previously mentioned dude, homeboy, and bro, although this usage remains very controversial. Members of other ethnicities will not use the word while around African-Americans, especially those they do not know.

In practice, its use and meaning are heavily dependent on context, with non-offensive examples ranging from a greeting, to reprimand, to general reference, to a use synonymous with male person. As of 2007, the word nigga was used more liberally by some younger members of all races and ethnicities in the United States. In addition to African-Americans, other ethnic groups have adopted the term as part of their vernacular, although this usage is very controversial.

=== N-word pass ===
The N-word pass is a colloquial term and internet meme referring to a notional social permission for a non-African-American to use the word nigga in a conversation without suffering social consequences, typically given to them by African-Americans. The practice of giving out or selling N-word passes, sometimes in a form of a physical ticket, is common in American schools and has received criticism from parents and teachers.

== Cultural influence ==
The phrase nigga, please, used in the 1970s by comics such as Paul Mooney as "a funny punctuation in jokes about Blacks", is now heard routinely in comedy routines by African-Americans. The growing use of the term is often attributed to its ubiquity in modern American hip hop music.

One of the earliest uses of the term in a popular song was in the lyrics of the 1983 song "New York New York" by Grandmaster Flash and the Furious Five, although it had featured in some very early hip hop recordings such as "Scoopy Rap" and "Family Rap", both from 1979. Ol' Dirty Bastard uses the term 76 times in his Nigga Please album (not including repetitions in choruses).

Comedian Chris Rock's 1996 routine "Niggas vs. Black People" distinguishes a "nigga", which he defined as a "low-expectation-havin' motherfucker", from a "black person". In contrast, Tupac Shakur distinguished between nigger and nigga: "Niggers was the ones on the rope, hanging off the thing; niggas is the ones with gold ropes, hanging out at clubs." Tupac, who has been credited with legitimizing the term, said his song "N.I.G.G.A." stood for "Never Ignorant Getting Goals Accomplished".

In 2001, a public disagreement between Conrad Tillard (activist and minister then, Conrad Muhammad) and Russell Simmons (Def Jam co-founder) erupted about the portrayal in media of hip hop culture, especially that of rap music. Tillard argued that the use of bitch and nigga by rappers is "degrad[ing] the African-American community" through its "bombardment of ... negative images". He directly accused Simmons of "condoning violence by refusing to condemn the frequent use of [these words] in rap lyrics" in the lead up to both parties organizing gatherings to discuss hip hop culture. Rapper KRS-One publicly supported Tillard, but stated that "if an artist feels he has to use the 'n' or 'b' words, that's a poetic debate. What we're saying is you cannot package the word muthaf---er to our children."[censoring quoted] Tillard's own Campaign for Dignity Meeting in April was boycotted by Simmons, who also encouraged others to not attend, while Simmons organized the Hip Hop Summit in June, which Tillard attended. The disagreement has been referred to as a "feud", and the two were successfully encouraged by Louis Farrakhan (head of the Nation of Islam) at Simmons' summit to bury the hatchet and show public unity.

The song "R & B" from Devin the Dude's second solo album Just Tryin' ta Live (2002) features a comedic conversation between Devin and "a redneck" (voiced by Devin) exploring a cultural divide and how it might be overcome by the liberal application of "reefer and beer". The song culminates with Devin frustrated by the redneck failing to correctly pronounce nigga.

In the 2004 Coen brothers film The Ladykillers, the antagonist is Marva Munson (Irma P. Hall), an elderly church-going landlady with moral certainty living in the Baptist bible belt, who is introduced making a complaint to her local sheriff about her neighbour playing "hippity hop music too loud". She qualifies her disdain by asking the sheriff rhetorically if he knows "what they call colored folks in them songs?" moving to quickly exclaim, "Niggaz" [or "Niggers"; sources have printed both spellings].

Some television shows use the word, either to create a realistic atmosphere or as a way of presenting social discussion, specifically ones relating to the wealth gap between the rich and the poor.

In South Sudan, some street gangs are commonly referred to as "Niggas", or "Niggers".

== Use in trademarks or brand names ==
Until a 2017 ruling by the U.S. Supreme Court in Matal v. Tam, the Lanham Act did not permit registration of trademarks containing terms that may disparage persons or bring them into disrepute. Registration of terms historically considered disparaging to certain groups by the U.S. Patent and Trademark Office (PTO) has been permitted in some circumstances. Self-disparaging trademarks have been allowed in cases where the applicant demonstrates that the mark, as used, is not regarded as disparaging by the relevant group.

In 1995, two men from Houston filed a trademark application with the PTO for the words "Naturally Intelligent God Gifted Africans", and its acronym. The application was rejected, as were numerous subsequent applications for variations of the word nigga. In 2005, comedian Damon Wayans twice attempted to trademark a brand name called Nigga, "featuring clothing, books, music and general merchandise". The PTO refused Wayans' application, stating "the very fact that debate is ongoing regarding in-[ethnic]-group usage, shows that a substantial composite of African-Americans find the term 'nigga' to be offensive".

== See also ==
- Reappropriation – Valuing a formerly pejorative term in esteem
