= Pound Cake speech =

2004 Bill Cosby oration

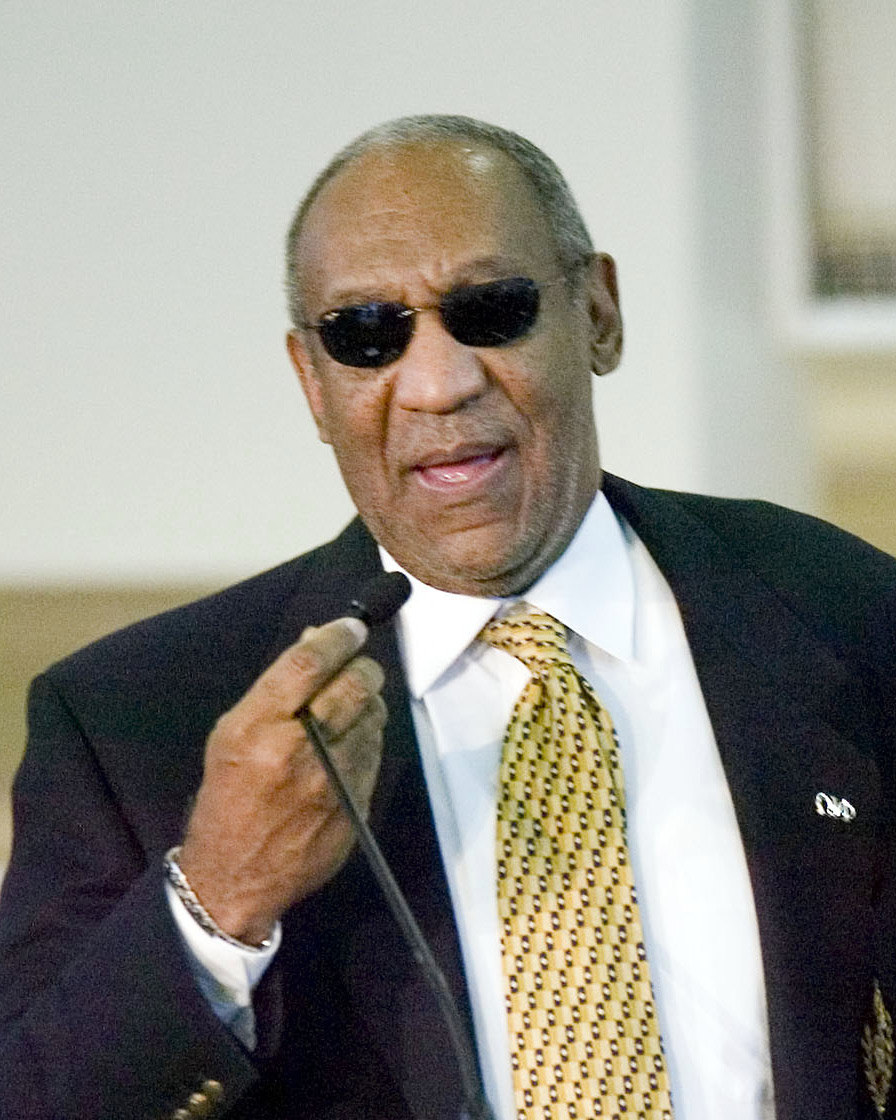
Bill Cosby in 2006

The Pound Cake speech (or Ghettoesburg Address) was given by Bill Cosby on May 17, 2004, during an NAACP Legal Defense Fund awards ceremony in Washington, D.C., to commemorate the 50th anniversary of the Brown v. Board of Education Supreme Court decision.

In the speech, which was subsequently widely disseminated and analyzed, Cosby was highly critical of the black community in the United States. He criticized the use of African-American Vernacular English, the prevalence of single-parent families and illegitimacy, perceived emphasis on frivolous and conspicuous consumption at the expense of necessities, lack of responsibility, and other behaviors.

== Content ==
The speech is often referred to as the "Pound Cake" speech because the following lines of the speech make reference to a pound cake, contrasting common criminals with political activists who risked incarceration during the civil rights movement in the 1950s and 1960s:

But these people, the ones up here in the balcony fought so hard. Looking at the incarcerated, these are not political criminals. These are people going around stealing Coca-Cola. People getting shot in the back of the head over a piece of pound cake! And then we all run out and are outraged, 'The cops shouldn't have shot him.' What the hell was he doing with the pound cake in his hand? I wanted a piece of pound cake just as bad as anybody else, and I looked at it and I had no money. And something called parenting said, 'If you get caught with it you're going to embarrass your mother.' Not 'You're going to get your butt kicked.' No. 'You're going to embarrass your family.'

Bill Cosby also covers the issues of dropout rates and youth incarceration. He blames lack of parenting for these issues within these communities:

In the neighborhood that most of us grew up in, parenting is not going on. In the old days, you couldn't hooky school because behind every drawn shade was an eye. And before your mother got off the bus and to the house, she knew exactly where you had gone, who had gone into the house, and where you got on whatever you had on and where you got it from. Parents don't know that today.

In the speech, Cosby says that African Americans should no longer blame discrimination, segregation, governmental institutions, or others for higher unemployment rates among blacks or the racial achievement gap; rather, they have their own culture of poverty to blame.

In the same speech, he had praise for the efforts of the Nation of Islam in dealing with crime in the cities, saying:

When you want to clear your neighborhood out, first thing you do is go get the black Muslims, bean pies and all. And your neighborhood is then clear.

After that statement, he pointed out the police's inability to resolve the crime problem:

The police can't do it.

He then had critical remarks for black Christians' seeming inability to create positive social change for the urban population to which he was referring:

I'm telling you Christians, what's wrong with you? Why can't you hit the streets? Why can't you clean it out yourselves?

Cosby also attacked black naming conventions, saying:

We are not Africans. Those people are not Africans; they don't know a damned thing about Africa. With names like Shaniqua, Shaligua, Mohammed and all that crap and all of them are in jail.

== Later comments ==
Cosby again came under sharp criticism, and was largely unapologetic for his stance on the issue, when he made similar remarks during a speech at a July 1 meeting of the Rainbow-Push Coalition that commemorated the anniversary of Brown v. Board, where he said, "you've got to stop beating up your women because you can't find a job, because you didn't want to get an education and now you're [earning] minimum wage." During that speech, he admonished apathetic blacks for not assisting or concerning themselves with the individuals who are involved with crime or have counterproductive aspirations. He further described those who needed attention as blacks who "had forgotten the sacrifices of those in the Civil Rights Movement."

== Reactions ==
The Christian Broadcasting Network said that the speech applied not only to African Americans but also to all Americans and their children. CBN also covered the end of Cosby's speech where he encourages listeners to go to their families and improve their parenting so, in turn, the black community can improve:

Well, I've got something to tell you about Jesus. When you go to the church, look at the stained glass things of Jesus. Look at them. Is Jesus smiling? Not in one picture. So, tell your friends. Let's try to do something. Let's try to make Jesus smile. Let's start parenting. Thank you, thank you.

In her book responding to the speech entitled Bill Cosby is Right, What Should the Church Be Doing About It?, Merisa Parson Davis discusses the role of strong families in the community and the church. She also points out statistics that have not changed since the speech was given. These statistics include the fact that homicide is still the leading cause of death for black males ages 12 to 19; that one out of three black men ages 20–29 are under some form of criminal justice supervision; and the fact that only 28 percent of black children are growing up with a mother and father in the home.

External videos
- After Words interview with Michael Eric Dyson on Is Bill Cosby Right: Or Has the Black Middle Class Lost Its Mind?, May 15, 2005, C-SPAN
- Book group discussion on Is Bill Cosby Right: Or Has the Black Middle Class Lost Its Mind?, February 28, 2006, C-SPAN

Sociologist Michael Eric Dyson criticized Cosby in his book Is Bill Cosby Right? Or Has the Black Middle Class Lost Its Mind? (2005). Dyson stated that Cosby built up years of mainstream credibility by ignoring race in his comedy routines and in his television programs, but then chose, with the Pound Cake speech, to address the issues of race by chastising poor blacks rather than by defending them. Dyson says that, in blaming low-income blacks for not taking personal responsibility, Cosby is ignoring "white society's responsibility in creating the problems he wants the poor to fix on their own".

In 2015, eleven years later, in circumstances described as "ironic", the speech was cited by Judge Eduardo C. Robreno as an example of Cosby's role as a "public moralist", when he unsealed court records to reveal Cosby's admissions of infidelity and giving Quaaludes to women prior to sexually assaulting them. Robreno wrote that, by volunteering to the public "his views on, among other things, childrearing, family life, education, and crime", Cosby had "narrowed the zone of privacy that he is entitled to claim". The motion was brought by the Associated Press and the admissions gave rise to further allegations that Cosby had committed numerous sexual assaults.

== See also ==
- C. Delores Tucker, publicly critiqued hip-hop culture
- Losing the Race
- Niggas vs. Black People, Chris Rock comedy routine drawing distinctions among African Americans
- "Pants on the Ground", a 2010 song critical of fashion trends among African-American youth.
- Respectability politics, in which members of marginalized groups focus on trying to bring their members' dress and habits into accord with dominant groups in their societies
