= Niggas vs. Black People =

Stand-up comedy routine by Chris Rock

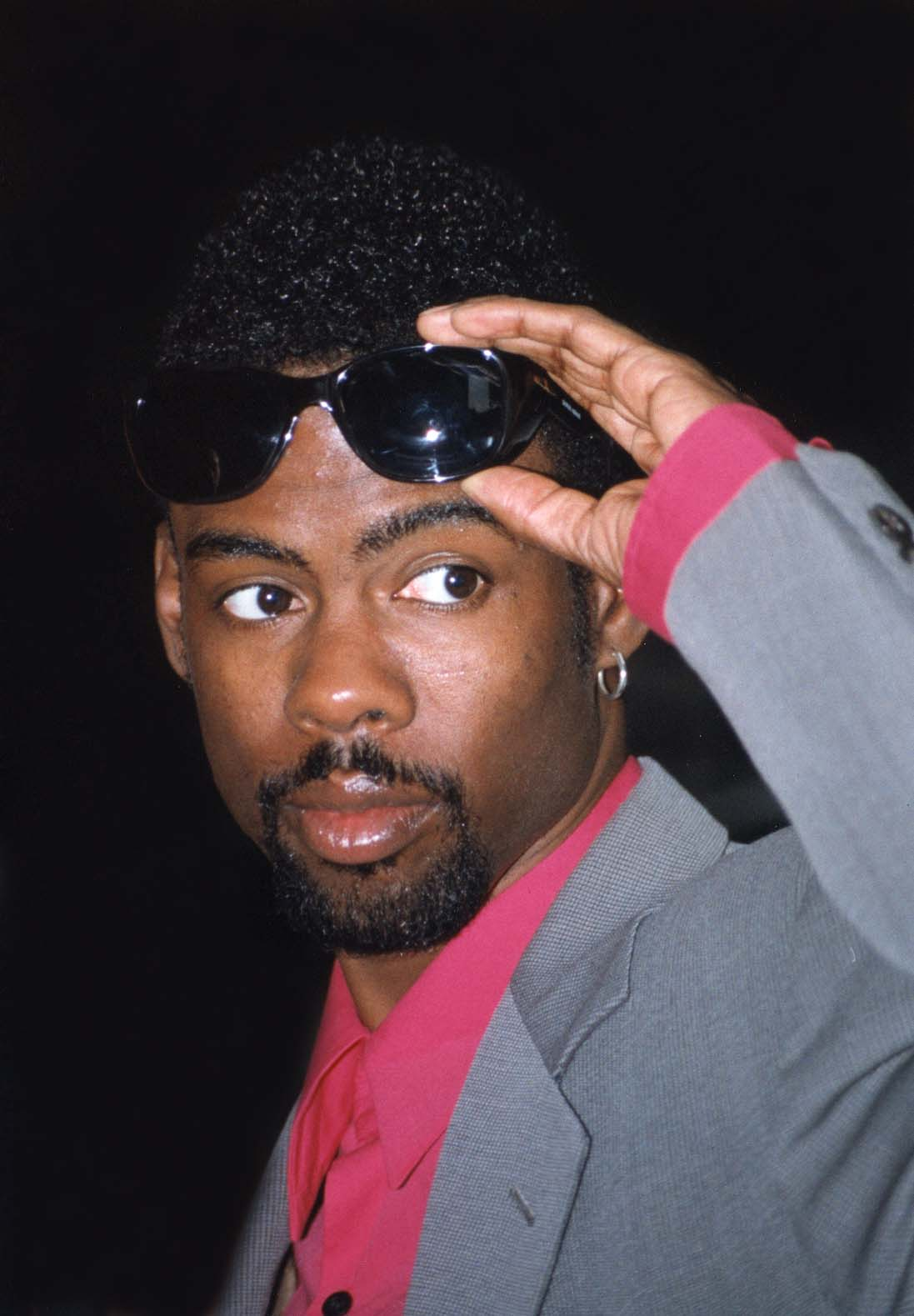
Chris Rock in 1995

"Niggas vs. Black People" is a Chris Rock stand-up comedy routine appearing both on his 1996 HBO special Bring the Pain, and as track 12 on his 1997 album Roll with the New.

The routine is a twelve-minute monologue about behaviors that are a subset of the African-American community. He describes "niggas" as a cohort whose behavior is usually detrimental to the image of other black people. "Niggas", he says, glorify ignorance and sloth, and brag about fulfilling any minor responsibility. Rock rejects the view that this image of blacks is purely cultivated by the media and stereotypes, at one point saying, "When I go to the money machine tonight, alright, I ain't looking over my back for the media, I'm looking for niggas! Shit, Ted Koppel ain't never took shit from me. Niggas have, so, you think I've got three guns in my house 'cause the media outside?"

== Inspiration ==
In a 2007 interview, Rock explained that the inspiration for the bit came from the song "Us" from the 1991 Ice Cube album Death Certificate.

== Retirement ==
The controversy caused by Rock's constant use of the word "nigga" led him to remove the rant from his show. In a 2005 60 Minutes interview, Rock said, "By the way, I've never done that joke again, ever, and I probably never will. 'Cos some people that were racist thought they had license to say nigga, so, I'm done with that routine."

== Cultural influence ==
Barack Obama directly referred to the routine while campaigning to be elected president during a Father's Day speech on June 15, 2008, saying, "Chris Rock had a routine. He said some—too many of our men, they're proud, they brag about doing things they're supposed to do. They say 'Well, I—I'm not in jail.' Well, you're not supposed to be in jail!"

In the second episode of the first season of NBC's The Office, "Diversity Day", the main character Michael Scott performs a version of this skit, which results in a day-long racial sensitivity seminar for the office staff.

== See also ==
- Pound Cake speech
- Respectability politics
- Situational code-switching
