= Who Is Chris Rock? =

- Directed by: Michael J. Dennis
- Written by: Michael J. Dennis
- Produced by: Michael J. Dennis
- Starring: Chris Rock Rosalie Rock
- Release date: July 22, 1989
- Running time: 9 minutes
- Country: United States
- Language: English

Who Is Chris Rock? is a short film about the life of comedian Chris Rock directed by Michael J. Dennis.

== Plot ==
Comedian Chris Rock and his mother talking about his life and work.
