= Michael J. Dennis =

American film director

- Born: Philadelphia, Pennsylvania, U.S.
- Occupations: Filmmaker, film promoter, YouTuber

Michael J. Dennis (b. Philadelphia, Pennsylvania) is an American filmmaker, film promoter YouTuber. A graduate of both New York University and The American Film Institute, his short films and documentaries have won numerous awards and have screened worldwide. In 1999, Dennis founded Reelblack, a full-service production company based in Philadelphia, Pennsylvania. In addition to producing work-for-hire, it is responsible for Reelblack TV, an entertainment/newsmagazine originally broadcast on PhillyCAM/DUTV. Partnered with YouTube, it has over 5 million views. Reelblack Presents and Soul Food Cinema are monthly film screenings designed to showcase classic films and work by up-and-coming filmmakers that relate to the Black experience. Since 2002, Reelblack has screened and promoted over 900 films.

As a filmmaker, Dennis has done music-related work, having documented the burgeoning Philly Neo-Soul scene in his films Jazzyfatnastees: In Process, A Taste Of Lady Alma, Kindred: In This Life Together and the Last Night at the Five Spot. His documentary feature, Philly Boy: A Movie About M.C. Breeze, made its debut at the first annual H2O Hip Hop Film Festival in 2002. His narrative short, Next Tuesday, produced for WYBE-TV in Philadelphia, and later aired on BET, is noted for its early soundtrack appearances by John Legend and Jazmine Sullivan.

In 2008, Dennis won the first ever CNN IReport Film Festival's Jury Prize for The 13th Amendment, a short film about his 90-year-old grandmother getting the opportunity to vote for Barack Obama. It premiered at the 2008 Urbanworld Film Festival and went on to screen at festivals worldwide as well as on BET’s Real Stories and YouTube’s Screening Room, where it racked up 300,000 views in its first three days. 2008 also brought the premiere of the half-hour documentary Ursula Rucker: Poet, which also premiered at Urbanworld. In February 2010, he was selected as one of 5 “Artists To Watch, by Philadelphia Weekly. Also that year, an early NYU video project, Who Is Chris Rock? (1989), was posted on YouTube, where it quickly gained notice by HuffPost, The Comic’s Comic and The New Yorker blogs.
