= Julius C. Tingman =

South Carolina farmer and politician (1841?–1917)

- Born: 1841? South Carolina
- Died: December 7, 1917; South Carolina
- Occupations: Soldier, state legislator

Julius Caesar Tingman (1841? – December 7, 1917) was an American soldier and South Carolina state legislator.

== Biography ==
Tingman was born to a woman named Mary Tingman in Berkeley County, South Carolina sometime in the late 1830s or early 1840s. He served as a corporal in the U.S. Colored Troops during the American Civil War. He was two-term member of the South Carolina House of Representatives during the Reconstruction era. Tingman was elected to represent Charleston County. In 1874 he introduced legislation to amend "the fence law so far as regards certain portions of Charleston; to repeal the game laws of the State; to compel dealers in turpentine, in Charleston County, to pay the laborers the Charleston market prices for crude turpentine." Tingman was the great-great-grandfather of comedians Chris Rock and Tony Rock.
