= Born Suspect =

Live album by Chris Rock
- Released: 1991
- Recorded: 1991
- Venue: Comedy Act Theater, Atlanta, GA
- Genre: Comedy
- Length: 46:54
- Label: Atlantic

Chris Rock chronology
Born Suspect (1991)	Roll with the New (1997)

Born Suspect is the first comedy album by Chris Rock, recorded in 1991 in Atlanta, Georgia.

Professional ratings
Review scores
Source	Rating
Allmusic	link

== Tracks ==
All tracks by Chris Rock, except where noted.

1. "Intro" – 0:28
2. "The South" – 0:46
3. "Weaves/Color Contacts" – 3:59
4. "Crack Mayor" – 4:56
5. "Busboys, McDonald's and Minimum Wage" – 2:28
6. "Taxes" – 2:21
7. "Poor Whites" – 2:56
8. "Rocky IV/Indians" – 1:50
9. "Blacks Aren't Crazy" – 2:58
10. "Uncle Bobby" – 1:28
11. "Teenage Suicide" – 1:18
12. "Prisons" – 2:49
13. "Driving Too Slow" – 0:51
14. "Women (Equal Rights, Honesty & Head)" – 6:32
15. "My Father" – 1:25
16. "Born Suspect" – 2:00
17. "Your Mother's Got a Big Head" – 4:37
18. "The Rib Man" (Mizell, Rock) – 3:12

== Personnel ==
- Prince Charles Alexander – Editing
- Diane Allford – Photography
- Kirth Atkins – Producer
- Angel Colon – Producer
- Jimmy Douglas – Editing
- Dean Dydek – Editing Assistant
- Jam Master Jay – Producer
- Dennis King – Mastering
- Kooster McAllister – Engineer
- Frank Moscati – Photography
- Chris Rock – Producer
- Ted Sabety – Mixing
- Yano – Engineer
