= No Sex (In the Champagne Room) =

Single by Chris Rock featuring Shadow

from the album Bigger & Blacker
- Released: July 13, 1999
- Genre: Comedy, spoken word, R&B, hip hop
- Length: 4:22
- Label: DreamWorks
- Songwriter: Chris Rock
- Producer: Prince Paul

Music video
- "No Sex (In the Champagne Room)" on YouTube

"No Sex (In the Champagne Room)" is a comedic spoken word track released by Chris Rock on his 1999 album, Bigger & Blacker, with a background chorus sung by Gerald Levert. Intended as a parody of Baz Luhrmann's "Everybody's Free (To Wear Sunscreen)", Rock gives one-line tidbits of advice purportedly aimed at "the GED class of 1999". In a 2017 interview, Rock said that Levert was in the song because Levert "just happened to be in the studio upstairs".

Targets of Rock's wit include parties with metal detectors, Hooters, women who don't look their age, Ol' Dirty Bastard and Coolio, horoscopes, and people with tongue piercings. The chorus, repeated several times, affirms that "no matter what a stripper tells you/There's no sex in the Champagne Room." This line was later quoted by Wyclef Jean in his own missive on exotic dancers, "Perfect Gentleman".

Rock's song received frequent play on the radio, and as a music video (directed by Little X) on MTV, where it ranked 43rd on TRL's "Top 99 of '99" after premiering on July 13, 1999.

The song was parodied on MADtv as "No Blacks (on the TV screen)". Phil LaMarr portrayed Rock in the parody.

A 2013 Phoenix New Times article referenced the song ironically noting accusations by Phoenix police that an adult club named "The Champagne Room" was harboring prostitution.
