= Chris Rock: Bring the Pain =

1996 US television special

- Genre: Stand-up comedy
- Written by: Chris Rock
- Directed by: Keith Truesdell
- Starring: Chris Rock
- Country of origin: United States
- Original language: English

Production
- Executive producers: Chris Rock; Michael Rotenberg; Sandy Chanley
- Producer: Tom Bull
- Editor: Brian Schnuckel
- Running time: 58 minutes
- Production companies: CR Enterprises; Production Partners

Original release
- Network: HBO
- Release: June 1, 1996

Chris Rock: Bring the Pain is a television special that premiered on HBO on June 1, 1996, starring comedian Chris Rock. This was Rock's second special for the network, following 1994's Big Ass Jokes as part of HBO Comedy Half-Hour. Rock was already a well-known comedian, but Bring the Pain made him one of the most popular comedians in the United States. The special included material about then-D.C. mayor Marion Barry, the O. J. Simpson murder case, dating, marriage, and race relations in America.

== Production ==
By 1994, Chris Rock's career had experienced a downslide: "I was a has-been. So I figured if I'm not going to be famous, I can at least get really good, and get back to being the way I was before I met Eddie Murphy and saw the big houses and the girls."

Rock became determined to subvert any preconceived notions about him. To prepare for the special, he honed his material for two years by performing nightly in comedy clubs and then launching a national tour. The special was taped at a tour stop at the Takoma Theatre in Washington, D.C.

== Reception ==
The special was regarded as one of the finest recorded stand-up comedy performances of all time. Entertainment Weekly called it "groundbreaking" and "a classic". Variety compared Rock to revered comedians Richard Pryor and Lenny Bruce and called it "one of the truly remarkable hours of comedy ever to air on television."

The most well-known and controversial piece of the special is "Niggas vs. Black People". The controversy around the twelve-minute routine led to Rock never performing it again. In a 2005 60 Minutes interview, Rock explained, "By the way, I've never done that joke again, ever, and I probably never will. 'Cos some people that were racist thought they had license to say nigger, so, I'm done with that routine."

Rock was surprised by the widespread acclaim the special received: "I thought, hopefully this will be better than other HBO specials, and I'll get whatever rewards come with that. Maybe somebody will want me to do a sitcom – if I'm lucky. Next thing they were talking about it on C-SPAN, and I'm, Huh? My only goal was to do a show that was good enough that when I played a club, I wouldn't have to promote it on radio."

In 1997, Rock won two Emmys for this special: Outstanding Variety, Music or Comedy Special, and Outstanding Writing for a Variety or Music Program. That same year, Rock also released a comedy album titled Roll with the New. The album combined material from the special with comedy sketches. It won the Grammy Award for Best Spoken Comedy Album. The success of the special prompted HBO to develop a weekly talk show for Rock titled The Chris Rock Show. Rock's acting career was also given a boost. He went from playing very minor roles in Sgt. Bilko and Panther to playing major roles in Lethal Weapon 4 and Dogma.
