= Head of State (2003 film) =

2003 American film by Chris Rock

- Theatrical release poster
- Directed by: Chris Rock
- Written by: Chris Rock; Ali LeRoi
- Produced by: Michael Rotenberg; Chris Rock; Ali LeRoi
- Starring: Chris Rock; Bernie Mac; Dylan Baker; Nick Searcy; Robin Givens; Lynn Whitfield; Tamala Jones; James Rebhorn
- Cinematography: Donald E. Thorin
- Edited by: Stephen A. Rotter
- Music by: Marcus Miller; DJ Quik
- Production companies: 3 Arts Entertainment; Chris Rock Productions
- Distributed by: DreamWorks Pictures
- Release date: March 28, 2003
- Running time: 95 minutes
- Country: United States
- Budget: $35 million
- Box office: $38.6 million

Head of State is a 2003 American political comedy film directed, written by, produced by and starring Chris Rock and co-starring Bernie Mac. It marked the directorial debut of Rock, who had previously worked as a writer, producer, and actor.

The plot follows a minor politician who unexpectedly becomes the president of the United States. The title refers to one of the president's functions as the American head of state.

Critical reviews were mixed to negative, and the film was a box office disappointment. This was the last film by cinematographer Donald E. Thorin.

== Plot ==
Mays Gilliam is the alderman for the 9th Ward in Washington, D.C. After learning he is likely to lose his job and getting dumped by his girlfriend, Kim, Gilliam is unexpectedly chosen as the Democratic Party candidate for the 2004 presidential election after his party's original presidential and vice-presidential nominees die in a plane crash and he is lauded as a hero for saving a woman from an explosion. Assuming the election was already lost to incumbent Republican vice-president Brian Lewis, the Democrats decided to pick a likable but unwinnable minority candidate to improve their chances in the 2008 presidential election.

At first, Gilliam feels he will not be able to succeed as president because he would be representing the entire African-American populace, and does not want to do anything to damage his reputation. However, Gilliam begins to rise in the polls after his brother Mitch persuades him to speak out for what he believes in. He ditches the bland, boring, and uncontroversial speeches prepared for him and begins to talk honestly about major issues such as welfare, healthcare, income inequality, and society overall. Mays even finds time to romance Lisa Clark, a gas station attendant he crosses paths with, and who has been a huge supporter of Mays.

After Lewis runs a series of attack ads including one saying Gilliam supports cancer, Gilliam begins to fight back using what he claimed was "kissing" his opponent (taken from Bugs Bunny–Elmer Fudd cartoons). A part of this strategy includes dubbing a videotape of Osama bin Laden saying he hates America but loves Brian Lewis. This strategy gains Gilliam even more points in the polls.

As election day draws closer, Gilliam eventually learns the reason why he was chosen as the party candidate, fires some disloyal campaign operatives (despite them having reconciled with him afterwards), and chooses his brother as his running mate. He later has a debate with his opponent in which he manages to win the crowd over by speaking the truth about American life. Finally, Gilliam ends up winning the presidency, and proposes to Lisa by saying he wants to make her his First Lady.

== Cast ==
- Chris Rock as Mays Gilliam, alderman, reluctant presidential candidate and later president of the United States.
- Bernie Mac as Mitch Gilliam, elder brother of Mays, vice presidential candidate and later vice president of the United States.
- Dylan Baker as Martin Geller
- Nick Searcy as Brian Lewis, incumbent vice president of the United States and presidential candidate.
- Lynn Whitfield as Debra Lassiter
- Robin Givens as Kim, the psychotic ex-girlfriend of Mays who tries to win him back after his nomination but is constantly taken away by security.
- Tamala Jones as Lisa Clark, Lots O'Gas gas station attendant and later First Lady of the United States
- James Rebhorn as Senator Bill Arnot
- Keith David as Bernard Cooper
- Tracy Morgan as Meat Hustler
- Stephanie March as Nicollette "Nikki" White, executive director of Internal Liaison
- Robert Stanton as Advisor
- Jude Ciccolella as Mr. Earl, security director
- Jeremy Borash as Wrestling announcer
- Ron Killings as himself
- Nate Dogg as himself
- Patrice O’Neal as Warren
- Mario Joyner as Lotto Man
- Ron Harris as Wrestler (uncredited)
- Jeff Jarrett as himself
- B. G. James as himself

== Production ==
Rock said in HBO First Look that he got the idea from the 1984 Democratic presidential nominee Walter Mondale, who chose Geraldine Ferraro—a woman—as his running mate. The Democrats knew they had little chance of defeating Ronald Reagan, but selected Ferraro in hopes of gaining female support.

The ceremonial first pitch scene was filmed prior to a Baltimore Orioles–Toronto Blue Jays game at Camden Yards on August 24, 2002.

Boston comedian and actor Jimmy Tingle has the role of a talk show host, in which he interviews Bernie Mac’s character Mitch.

Part of the presidential debate is a verbatim repeat of Monty Python's Argument Clinic.

In one scene, Gilliam quotes "The Roof Is on Fire" by Rock Master Scott & the Dynamic Three.

According to the DVD audio commentary, the scene where Gilliam sings "Deep in the Heart of Texas" is a reference to Pee-wee's Big Adventure, where Pee-Wee Herman does the same thing.

== Reception ==
Head of State received generally negative reviews from critics. On Rotten Tomatoes, the film maintains a score of 30% approval rating from 120 critics, with the critical consensus reading, "Head of State squanders its potentially ripe premise with watered-down satire and formulaic gags." On Metacritic, the film maintains a score of 44/100, indicating "mixed or average" reviews. Audiences polled by CinemaScore gave the film an average grade of "B+" on an A+ to F scale.

Roger Ebert, writing for Chicago Sun-Times, gave the film 3/4 stars, writing that it's "an imperfect movie, but not a boring one and not lacking in intelligence."
