= Bigger & Blacker =

1999 American stand-up comedy special starring Chris Rock

- Genre: Stand-up comedy
- Written by: Chris Rock
- Directed by: Keith Truesdell
- Starring: Chris Rock
- Country of origin: United States
- Original language: English

Production
- Executive producers: Chris Rock; Michael Rotenberg; Sandy Chanley
- Producer: Tom Bull
- Editor: Grady Cooper
- Running time: 65 minutes
- Production companies: CR Enterprises; Production Partners; 3 Arts Entertainment

Original release
- Network: HBO
- Release: July 10, 1999

Bigger & Blacker is a television special that premiered on HBO on July 10, 1999, starring comedian Chris Rock. This is Rock's third special for HBO and was recorded at the Apollo Theater in Harlem.

== CD version ==
Bigger & Blacker

Live album by Chris Rock
- Released: July 13, 1999
- Recorded: May 1999
- Venue: Apollo Theater, Harlem
- Genre: Comedy
- Length: 67:53
- Label: DreamWorks
- Producer: Prince Paul & Don Newkirk

Chris Rock chronology
Roll with the New (1997)	Bigger & Blacker (1999)	Never Scared (2005)

The CD version was released on July 13, 1999, on the DreamWorks label. The album features the same live stand-up comedy material from the HBO special, but it also includes studio-recorded comic sketches, featuring Ol' Dirty Bastard, Biz Markie, Gerald Levert, Ali LeRoi, Wanda Sykes, Kaz Silver, Horatio Sanz, Ice Cube, Robin Montague, Kali Londono, Don Newkirk, Kate Wright, and Nneka Kai Morton.

=== Track listing ===
1. Clermont Lounge #1 – 0:55
2. "Black Mall" – 3:47
3. ODB Words of Wisdom #1 – 0:15
4. "Crazy White Kids" – 8:26
5. Monica Interview – 1:58
6. "Porno PSA" – 1:32
7. "No Sex" – 4:22
8. "Taxes" – 1:57
9. ODB Words of Wisdom #2 – 0:17
10. Savion Glover – 1:02
11. "Insurance" – 8:17
12. Clermont Lounge #2 – 0:58
13. Nerd & Fly Girl – 2:58
14. "Race" – 4:17
15. NYPD – 1:29
16. ODB Words of Wisdom #3 – 0:19
17. Roger & Zapp – 0:29
18. "Two Women" – 4:07
19. Table Dance – 2:29
20. Snow Flake – 3:10
21. "Women" – 7:54
22. Me & ODB – 7:09

=== Reviews ===
Professional ratings
Review scores
Source	Rating
Allmusic	link

Bigger & Blacker won the 2000 Grammy Award for Best Spoken Comedy Album.

=== Personnel ===
- Pen & Pixel - Cover art

=== Sales ===
Region	Certification	Certified units/sales
United States	—	404,000
