= The Motherfucker with the Hat =

Play written by Stephen Adly Guirgis

- Original language: English
- Written by: Stephen Adly Guirgis
- Characters: Ralph D.; Jackie; Veronica; Cousin Julio; Victoria

Premiere
- Date: April 11, 2011
- Place: Gerald Schoenfeld Theatre, New York City

The Motherfucker with the Hat (sometimes censored as The Motherf**ker with the Hat and The Mother with the Hat) is a 2011 play by Stephen Adly Guirgis. The play is described as "a high-octane verbal cage match about love, fidelity and misplaced haberdashery."

== Synopsis ==
Jackie is a former drug dealer who has just been released from prison to join the American workforce. His girlfriend Veronica, however, still uses cocaine and other drugs. The play begins with an intense and comic phone conversation between Veronica and her mother, who's also an addict. Jackie arrives shortly thereafter. Just as Jackie and Veronica are jumping into bed, he sees a hat in her apartment. Realizing it is not his, he accuses her of cheating, going to his drug and parole counselor, Ralph D., for help. Meanwhile, Ralph's wife, Victoria, has "had it up to here with his helium."

Jackie obtains a gun. Ralph insists that he not keep it, so he gives it to his cousin Julio for safekeeping. Jackie reveals that he had slept with his previous Alcoholics Anonymous counselor, which may be part of the reason Veronica mistrusts him. Later, Veronica is entertaining a lover, which is revealed to be Ralph. They had slept together a handful of times while Jackie was in prison.

Meanwhile, Jackie gets the gun back and returns the hat to a man in their building who he thinks is its owner. He then throws it on the floor and shoots it. Jackie talks about this with Victoria, who is tired of Ralph's cheating and begs Jackie to sleep with her. She reveals to him that Veronica and Ralph have slept together—Ralph was really "the motherfucker with the hat." Jackie shows up at Veronica's apartment drunk, hurt because they have been in love since high school. When he gets loud, she hits him with a bat.

Julio takes Jackie in. He reveals that he is grateful because, years ago, Jackie showed unexpected kindness to him. Jackie wants to confront Ralph, and Julio is willing to cover his back, claiming to be a "Van Damme".

Jackie goes to Ralph's. The two men try to fight it out but end up futilely wrestling on the floor. Ralph admits he slept with Veronica and explains that she will never love him until she chooses to sober up. In spite of everything, he would like to be friends with Jackie. Jackie refuses to accept his friendship and returns to the apartment to pick up his things. He has broken parole by shooting the gun and is heading off to prison for a short stint. He tries to tell Veronica he loves her, but she runs out of the room, unwilling to listen. He leaves. A few moments later, Veronica comes out of hiding and calls his name.

== Productions ==
The Motherfucker with the Hat premiered at Broadway's Gerald Schoenfeld Theatre on April 11, 2011, following previews from March 15.Scott Rudin, The Public Theater, and LAByrinth Theater Company were among the producers. The cast starred Chris Rock in his Broadway debut as Ralph D., with Bobby Cannavale (Jackie), Annabella Sciorra (Victoria), Elizabeth Rodriguez (Veronica) and Yul Vázquez (Cousin Julio). It was directed by Anna D. Shapiro, with music by Terence Blanchard, set design by Todd Rosenthal, sound design by Acme Sound Partners, costumes by Mimi O’Donnell, and lighting by Donald Holder. The production closed on July 17, 2011.

The first regional production of the play was at Theaterworks in Hartford, Connecticut, premiering on October 14, 2011. The cast included Royce Johnson as Ralph D., Ben Cole as Jackie, Vanessa Wasche as Victoria, Clea Alsip as Veronica and Varin Ayala as Cousin Julio. It was directed by Tazewell Thompson. On November 30, 2011, author Stephen Adly Guirguis aired his complaints with the casting of this production, saying that director Thompson had cast white actors in two parts intended to be portrayed as Puerto Rican. Thompson also included a scene of full-frontal male nudity which was not in the original Broadway production, but was in the script.

In January 2013 The Motherfucker with the Hat was produced at San Francisco Playhouse in San Francisco where it was very well received.

There was also a production of the play which opened at the Allways Theatre in New Orleans, Louisiana. It was directed by Joshua Parham and starred Michael Santos, Kate Kuen, Armando Leduc, Martin Bradford and Michelle Martin. It was very well received.

On 21 January 2015, it was announced the play would receive its UK premiere at the Lyttelton Theatre, part of The National Theatre beginning 10 June.

In November 2015, There was a production of the play which opened at the Southside Theatre at Purchase College in Purchase, New York. Produced by the Anima Vox Theatre Collective. It was directed by Keith Weiss and starred Gregory Lakhan as Ralph D., Charlie Gonzalez as Jackie, Luz Guzman as Veronica, Anita Bennett as Victoria, and Josh Nasser as Cousin Julio.

== Response ==
=== Critical reception ===
On its opening night performance, The Motherfucker with the Hat received mixed reviews from New York critics.

The Wall Street Journal's review wrote, "What makes Hat more than just a foul-mouthed, fast-moving farce is that Mr. Guirgis's real subject turns out to be moral relativism. The impeccably sober Ralph D., who has swapped booze for fluorescent-colored nutritional beverages, preaches the gospel of AA with a convert's fervor, yet it doesn't stop him from doing whatever he wants to whomever he wants. Jackie, by contrast, has yet to master his self-destructive impulses, but at least he knows that the point of getting sober is not to become more efficient at taking advantage of other people: "Your – whaddyacallit – your world view? It ain't mine. And the day it is, that's the day I shoot myself in the head. I didn't get clean to live like that."... Don't let the stupid title put you off. If you do, you'll miss one of the best new plays to come to Broadway in ages."

Ben Brantley of The New York Times said, "The play that dare not speak its name turns out to have a lot to say. Stephen Adly Guirgis’s vibrant and surprisingly serious new comedy opened on Monday night at the Gerald Schoenfeld Theater under a title that cannot be printed in most daily newspapers or mentioned on network television. This is vexing for those of us who would like to extol the virtues of "The ___________ with the Hat", at least in public. (The title also seems to have created problems for the people trying to publicize the play.) This is by far the most accomplished and affecting work from the gifted Mr. Guirgis, a prolific and erratic chronicler of marginal lives."

The New York Post gave mixed reactions: "In his Broadway debut, Chris Rock plays Ralph D., the AA sponsor of Bobby Cannavale's Jackie. They share some heavy scenes – red-blooded, profanity-laden bouts – but Rock is a lightweight: The more experienced, more assured Cannavale knocks him out without even trying. This is a big problem because Stephen Adly Guirgis' new dark comedy, "The Motherf**ker with the Hat", pivots on the evolving relationship between the two. Rock's tentative performance creates an imbalance that throws the show out of whack."

In reviewing the production, Marilyn Stasio (Variety) wrote, "... Anna D. Shapiro [is] an entirely worthy helmer, [but] doesn't seem to speak the same theatrical language as the [cast]." Scott Brown in New York gave a negative review, saying, "But the play really doesn’t have the heft to earn the death of hope, nor does it have the stones or the seriousness to declare hope officially dead. Motherf**ker mainly concerns itself with a lot of big, mordant laughs ... yet overall, the play feels jumpy and scant."

The Motherfucker with the Hat has also been produced in regional theaters. A version (Nov. 21-Dec. 8, 2013) at barebones productions in Pittsburgh received a strong response, both in the press and the box office. The "Pittsburgh Post-Gazette" said, in part, that in contrast with other plays staged at this time of year, the play is "sort of cute, definitely colorful, more tart than sweet and not wholesome at all, but, for those who don't find all that a drawback, astonishingly funny."

=== Box office sales and advertising ===
Michael Riedel in The New York Post reported that in early April 2011, the show only grossed $239,000, though its gross potential was $867,000: "For whatever reason, nobody wants to see this show". The production is expected to cost $3 million. He noted that the title of the show has been "debilitating" for advertising. Wrote Riedel, "[They] simply can't get the name of the play out there, [because] Chris can talk about it, but he can't say the title, so nobody knows what it is."

According to Variety, the box-office takings of the show during its first week of preview performances were $239,221. In The Motherfucker with the Hat's opening week, it grossed $270,309, playing to 82.9% capacity.

To advertise the show, Rock has made appearances on CBS News and Late Show with David Letterman. In addition, he was interviewed by The New York Times and ABC News, among others.

The show closed the week ended July 17, 2011, after 112 performances and finished in the top 10 for its final week with a gross of $870,024 being at 101.3% capacity. Its total gross was $10,451,323.

=== Awards and nominations ===
Award	Outcome
2011 Drama League Awards
Distinguished Production of a Play	Nominated
Distinguished Performance: Chris Rock	Nominated
Distinguished Performance: Bobby Cannavale	Nominated
2011 Outer Critics Circle Awards
Outstanding New Broadway Play	Nominated
Outstanding Director of a Play: Anna D. Shapiro	Nominated
Outstanding Set Design: Todd Rosenthal	Nominated
Outstanding Actor in a Play: Bobby Cannavale	Nominated
Outstanding Featured Actor in a Play: Yul Vázquez	Nominated
Outstanding Featured Actress in a Play: Elizabeth Rodriguez	Won
2011 Drama Desk Awards
Outstanding Play	Nominated
Outstanding Actor in a Play: Bobby Cannavale	Won
Outstanding Featured Actor in a Play: Yul Vázquez	Nominated
2011 Tony Awards
Best Play	Nominated
Best Performance by an Actor in a Leading Role in a Play: Bobby Cannavale	Nominated
Best Performance by an Actor in a Featured Role in a Play: Yul Vázquez	Nominated
Best Performance by an Actress in a Featured Role in a Play: Elizabeth Rodriguez	Nominated
Best Direction of a Play: Anna D. Shapiro	Nominated
Best Scenic Design of a Play: Todd Rosenthal	Nominated
2011 Broadway.com Audience Choice Awards
Favorite Play	Nominated
Favorite Actor in a Play: Bobby Cannavale	Nominated
2011 Theatre World Awards
Lunt-Fontanne Award for Ensemble Excellence	Won
