= Roll with the New =

Live album by Chris Rock
- Released: April 8, 1997
- Recorded: October–December 1996
- Genre: Comedy
- Length: 57:14
- Label: DreamWorks
- Producer: Prince Paul

Chris Rock chronology
Born Suspect (1991)	Roll with the New (1997)	Bigger & Blacker (1999)

Roll with the New is the second comedy album by Chris Rock. It is a combination of live material (also seen in his special Bring the Pain) and comedy sketches. The album won the 1998 Grammy Award for Best Spoken Comedy Album.

Professional ratings
Review scores
Source	Rating
Allmusic	link

== Tracks ==
1. Opening/Crickets
2. Marion Barry/Million Man March
3. This Show Sucks #1
4. Luther Campbell
5. Cheap Pete
6. Tossed Salad
7. Press Conference
8. O.J., I Understand
9. O.J. & O'Jays
10. Champagne
11. This Show Sucks #2
12. Niggas vs. Black People
13. I Loved the Show
14. Introducing Mary Wong
15. My Favorite Joke
16. This Show Sucks #3
17. Bad Phone Sex
18. I'm Back
19. Another Face Song
20. The Commitment Dilemma/Closing

== Personnel ==
- Produced by Prince Paul
- Associate producer: Merry Harper
- Executive producer: Chris Rock
- Performers: Chris Rock, Jim Breuer, Mario Joyner, Tracy Morgan, Dave Chappelle, Ali Leroi,

=== Certifications ===
Region	Certification	Certified units/sales
United States	—	239,000
