= Top Five =

2014 film by Chris Rock

- Theatrical release poster
- Directed by: Chris Rock
- Written by: Chris Rock
- Produced by: Scott Rudin; Eli Bush
- Starring: Chris Rock; Rosario Dawson; Gabrielle Union; Cedric the Entertainer; J. B. Smoove; Tracy Morgan; Kevin Hart; Anders Holm; Jay Pharoah; Michael Che; Sherri Shepherd; Leslie Jones
- Cinematography: Manuel Alberto Claro
- Edited by: Anne McCabe
- Music by: Ahmir "Questlove" Thompson; Ludwig Göransson
- Production companies: IAC Films; Scott Rudin Productions; Jax Media
- Distributed by: Paramount Pictures
- Release dates: September 6, 2014 (TIFF); December 12, 2014 (United States)
- Running time: 102 minutes
- Country: United States
- Language: English
- Budget: $12 million
- Box office: $26.1 million

Top Five is a 2014 American romantic comedy-drama film written and directed by Chris Rock. Produced by Scott Rudin and Eli Bush, the film stars Rock, Rosario Dawson, and Gabrielle Union, and follows New York City comedian and film star Andre Allen (Rock), who has to confront his past and comedic career while doing an interview with journalist Chelsea Brown (Dawson).

The ensemble cast features comedians J. B. Smoove, Kevin Hart, Sherri Shepherd, Michael Che, Tracy Morgan, Jay Pharoah, Leslie Jones, and Cedric the Entertainer. Comedians Jerry Seinfeld, Adam Sandler, and Whoopi Goldberg appear as fictionalized versions of themselves.

It was screened in the Special Presentations section of the 2014 Toronto International Film Festival and was released in the United States on December 12, 2014, by Paramount Pictures. It received critical acclaim, with praise directed at the performances of the cast, and Rock's screenplay and direction, as well as comparisons to Woody Allen's Stardust Memories (1980).

== Plot ==
New York Times reporter Chelsea Brown is spending a day interviewing comedian and recovering alcoholic Andre Allen, star of the hit film franchise Hammy The Bear, about a cop in a bear suit. Chelsea has forgotten her audio recorder, so they first go to her apartment. While there they discuss a magazine article about the Cinderella complex. Chelsea explains that Cinderella left something behind to let the prince know that she wanted to see him again.

Andre is attempting a foray into serious films with Uprize, in which he portrays Haitian Revolution figure Dutty Boukman, and is sensitive to criticism, particularly by Times critic James Nielson, whose previous reviews of his work have been negative and insulting.

As the interview begins in his limousine, Andre recalls his lowest point, when he was in Houston in 2003 and met Jazzy Dee, who supplied him with drugs, alcohol and women. When Jazzy refused to pay them, they contended they were raped, leading to Andre's arrest and subsequent sobriety.

The limo gets hit by a cab, so Andre and Chelsea wander the city. He stops to pick up the rings for his wedding to reality-TV star Erica Long. Following a subtle, tense interaction with Andre assisting an acquaintance who is actually his father, they visit the apartment of his old friends and ex-girlfriend.

Chelsea interviews each, learning that Andre was not particularly funny when he started doing stand-up. They nominate their five favorite rappers, including a sixth as well. Andre goes to radio shows such as Opie and Anthony to promote Uprize and attends a press conference with fellow stars Taraji P. Henson and Gabourey Sidibe. To his chagrin, Andre is asked about the next Hammy movie.

At a hotel, Andre and Chelsea unexpectedly encounter her boyfriend, Brad, along with his friend Ryan, who is wearing Brad's shirt. She deduces Brad is cheating on her with Ryan. She and Andre, both recovering alcoholics, stop in a liquor store but resist making a purchase. Chelsea explains in graphic detail how the signs were there that Brad was gay. Andre laughs, calling Chelsea naive. She becomes angry and insults his movie, but they end up kissing.

Andre asks to borrow Chelsea's phone, as his own died. While using it, he sees an email from her editor, revealing she is James Nielson. The truth devastates Andre, who angrily tells Chelsea he felt he was never funny unless he was drunk or high, and now is fearful for his career. Despondent and acting out at a supermarket, he is arrested.

In jail, Andre calls Erica, who fumes over the arrest, mainly because of how it will look for her image. She tells him this piece of fame is all she has since she thinks she has no other talent. Erica's manager Benny takes the phone and tells Andre to go to his bachelor party for good press and fly out for the wedding.

Andre's bodyguard Silk bails out Andre, and they go to a strip club for a bachelor party with a Hammy The Bear theme. There, Andre hangs out with Jerry Seinfeld, Adam Sandler, and Whoopi Goldberg, who give him different views on marriage and sex. Chelsea finds him there, wanting to make it up to him.

Andre, Chelsea, and Silk go to the Comedy Cellar, where Andre gets up onstage and performs standup for the first time in years. He is still funny, and the crowd loves him. Afterwards, he tells Chelsea he got inspired after being in jail and talking to DMX, who told Andre he does not want to keep rapping and wants to sing instead. DMX then sang "Smile", terribly.

They drop Chelsea off at home, where she and Andre share one last kiss. He asks for her top five rappers, which she lists. While driving away, Silk tells Andre he should have gone after Chelsea. Andre goes through the gift bag from the party and finds items including a scented candle and a bottle of vodka. Then he pulls out a slipper, and Silk smiles.

After the credits begin rolling, the movie returns to the party, where Jerry Seinfeld shares his "top five" as Sugarhill Gang, Eminem, Wale, Ice Cube, and Sir Mix-a-Lot.

== Cast ==
- Chris Rock as Andre Allen
- Rosario Dawson as Chelsea Brown, a journalist assigned to interview Andre
- Gabrielle Union as Erica Long, Andre's fiancée
- Kevin Hart as Charles, Andre's Ivy League-educated agent
- Sherri Shepherd as Vanessa, Andre's ex-girlfriend who still lives in the neighborhood
- J. B. Smoove as Silk, Andre's "security guard/assistant" who is never far from his boss's side
- Romany Malco as Benny Barnes
- Hayley Marie Norman as Tammy
- Karlie Redd as Rhonda
- Rachel Feinstein as Publicist
- Dan Naturman as Young Comic
- Rick Shapiro as Biker AA Guy
- Greer Barnes as Uprize Actor
- Leslie Jones as Lisa
- Annaleigh Ashford as Michele
- Whoopi Goldberg as Herself
- Jerry Seinfeld as Himself
- Adam Sandler as Himself
- Tracy Morgan as Fred
- Anders Holm as Brad
- Matthew Wilkas as Ryan
- Cedric the Entertainer as Jazzy Dee
- Opie and Anthony as Themselves
- Michael Che as Paul
- Ben Vereen as Carl Allen, Andre's Father
- Brian Regan as Engineer
- Jay Pharoah as Mike
- Hassan Johnson as Craig
- Doug Stanhope as Police Officer
- Tichina Arnold as Theatre Manager
- Luis Guzmán as Himself
- Julie Halston as Cell Phone Lady
- Míriam Colón as Chelsea's Grandmother
- Olga Merediz as Chelsea's Mom
- Taraji P. Henson as Herself
- Gabourey Sidibe as Herself
- DMX as Himself
- Charlie Rose as Himself
- Bruce Bruce as Himself

== Production ==
Principal photography began on June 24, 2013, in New York City. In July 2014, the film's title was changed from Finally Famous to Top Five.

== Release ==
The film premiered at the 2014 Toronto International Film Festival on September 6, 2014. Shortly after, a bidding war for distribution rights ensued between multiple studios including Sony Pictures, Paramount Pictures, Fox Searchlight, Open Road Films, A24, Relativity Media and Lionsgate, with bids reaching as high as over $10 million and Paramount emerging as the frontrunner the next day. On September 10, 2014, Paramount Pictures confirmed their acquisition of the film's worldwide distribution rights for $12.5 million and agreed to pay at least $20 million in promotion and marketing. In November 2014, Paramount announced Top Five would receive a wide release on December 12, 2014.

=== Home media ===
Top Five was released on Blu-ray and DVD on March 17, 2015.

== Reception ==
Review aggregation website Rotten Tomatoes gives the film an approval rating of 85%, based on 186 reviews, with an average rating of 7.2/10. The site's critical consensus reads, "As smart, funny, and trenchant as writer-director-star Chris Rock's best standup work, Top Five is a career highlight for its creator—and one of the comedy standouts of 2014." Metacritic gives the film a score of 81 out of 100, based on 37 reviews, indicating "universal acclaim".

Some critics found similarities between the Andre Allen character and Woody Allen's Sandy Bates in Stardust Memories (1980).

== Accolades ==
Award	Category	Person	
20th Critics' Choice Awards	Best Comedy		Nominated
20th Critics' Choice Awards	Best Actor in a Comedy	Chris Rock	Nominated
20th Critics' Choice Awards	Best Actress in a Comedy	Rosario Dawson	Nominated

== Future ==
In an interview with Complex, Rock said he meets with producer Scott Rudin "every week now going over this next movie", and that Rudin wants him "to work at a faster pace". He also suggested that "a lot of the same cast" would be involved, mentioning that "you might want to see see a little more of Leslie Jones or Tracy [Morgan], once he gets better. I think Jerry Seinfeld showed us things we haven't seen."

The 2016 Tyler Perry comedy film, Boo! A Madea Halloween, is based on a fictional film featured in Top Five.

== See also ==
- List of black films of the 2010s
- List of films featuring fictional films
