= Chris Rock: Tamborine =

2018 American stand-up comedy special

- Written by: Chris Rock
- Directed by: Bo Burnham
- Starring: Chris Rock
- Country of origin: United States
- Original language: English

Production
- Producers: Neal Brennan; Matthew Claybrooks; Tony Hernandez; Christopher Storer; John Skidmore
- Cinematography: Andrew Wehde
- Editor: Michael Schultz
- Running time: 64 minutes 97 minutes (extended)
- Production company: Jax Media

Original release
- Network: Netflix
- Release: February 14, 2018

Tamborine is the sixth stand-up comedy special by American comedian Chris Rock, released by Netflix on February 14, 2018. Directed by Bo Burnham and produced by Neal Brennan, it is Rock's first special for Netflix and his first special in 10 years.

== Reception ==
Tamborine received overwhelmingly positive reviews from critics, with praise directed towards the special's political themes, Burnham's direction, and Rock's ability to address aspects of his personal life, with some stating that "[Rock] bares his soul". Rotten Tomatoes gave it an approval rating of 100% based on 23 reviews, with an average rating of 7.5/10. The website's critical consensus reads, "Chris Rock reasserts his credentials as one of comedy's preeminent figures in Tamborine, an introspective standup act delivered with fresh sensitivity and trademark exuberance."

Kelly Lawler of USA Today wrote, "Tamborine is rife with political humor and pointed observations on race in Rock's usual style, but the special is mostly about Rock himself, a self-reflective piece in which he owns up to his mistakes." Kristen Baldwin of Entertainment Weekly gave the special a B+, writing, "Tamborine never goes too dark, nor does Rock ever truly blur the line between stand-up set and therapy session... he never loses sight of the comedy, even as he distributes the hard-earned wisdom that comes from regret."

In 2021, an extended and re-edited cut called Total Blackout: The Tamborine Extended Cut was released. Directed by Rock with no involvement from Burnham, it added an extra 30 minutes of content but received mixed reviews for what critics saw as a mistake in removing Burnham's artistic decisions.
