= Never Scared =

2004 Chris Rock stand-up comedy special

- Genre: Stand-up comedy
- Written by: Chris Rock
- Directed by: Joel Gallen
- Starring: Chris Rock
- Country of origin: United States
- Original language: English

Production
- Executive producers: Chris Rock; Michael Rotenberg; Joel Gallen
- Editors: Bill DeRonde; Ryan Polito; Yoram Tal
- Running time: 80 minutes
- Production companies: CR Enterprises; Tenth Planet Productions; 3 Arts Entertainment

Original release
- Network: HBO
- Release: April 17, 2004

Never Scared is a television special that premiered on HBO on April 17, 2004, starring comedian Chris Rock. It is the fourth special by Chris Rock recorded at the DAR Constitution Hall in Washington, D.C., on March 24, 2004.

== CD version ==
Never Scared

Live album by Chris Rock
- Released: February 15, 2005
- Recorded: March 24, 2004
- Venue: DAR Constitution Hall, Washington, D.C.
- Genre: Comedy; spoken word
- Length: 75:26
- Label: DreamWorks/Geffen
- Producer: Prince Paul and Don Newkirk

Chris Rock chronology
| Bigger & Blacker (1999) | Never Scared (2005) |

The CD version, released on February 15, 2005, includes several recorded segments including a rap song performed with Lil' Jon called "Get Lower", and recurring themes of "Thug Radio" and "Tip Your Hat to Whitey". At the conclusion of the album is a spoof movie trailer titled "Who Tha Fuck You Looking At"; the protagonists are made out to be black men, but the voice-over gives the cast as Steven Seagal, Chingy, Sidney Poitier and the sound of machine guns.

The skit "The Morning After" is a parody of "Where Are My Panties" from the album Speakerboxxx/The Love Below by Outkast.

=== Track listing ===
1. "Thug Radio Intro" – 0:25
2. "Off the Pole" – 5:57
3. "Real People of Ignorance (Rap Star)" – 1:02
4. "Smack Her With A Dick (Rap Stand Up)" – 9:25
5. "K-Rock" – 0:12
6. "Get Lower (featuring Lil' Jon)" – 2:38
7. "Jacksons Gone Wild" – 10:05
8. "Thug News" – 0:34
9. "Tip Your Hat to Whitey (Hawaii)" – 1:19
10. "The War" – 3:01
11. "Black Poet" – 1:48
12. "Feed Other Countries" – 1:38
13. "Ballmart" – 0:38
14. "Drugs, Donuts, & Wealth" – 9:42
15. "Thug Radio ID" – 0:10
16. "Tip Your Hat to Whitey (Jamaica)" – 1:33
17. "Affirmative Action" – 7:50
18. "Tip Your Hat to Whitey (Mars)" – 1:27
19. "Don't Cheat" – 1:29
20. "The Morning After" – 0:21
21. "Real People of Ignorance (Tattoo)" – 1:03
22. "Women Hate Women" – 2:42
23. "K-Rock ID #2" – 0:05
24. "Marriage" – 7:42
25. "Thug Radio Sign Off" – 2:40

=== Reception ===
Never Scared won the 2006 Grammy Award for Best Comedy Album.

== References in popular culture ==
The 2012 rap song "Fair Fight" by the group Strong Arm Steady samples a quote from the special, alongside a number of quotes from Eddie Griffin's DysFUNKtional Family comedy show.
