= Chris Rock =

American comedian, actor, and filmmaker (born 1965)

- Rock in 2026
- Born: Christopher Julius Rock; February 7, 1965 (age 61); Andrews, South Carolina, U.S.
- Occupations: Comedian; actor; writer; producer; director
- Notable work: Filmography
- Spouse: Malaak Compton (m. 1996; div. 2016)
- Children: 2
- Relatives: Tony Rock (brother); Kenny Rock (brother); Jordan Rock (brother)
- Awards: Full list

Comedy career
- Years active: 1984–present
- Medium: Stand-up; film; television
- Genres: Observational comedy; black comedy; sketch comedy; insult comedy; blue comedy; sarcasm; racial humor; satire
- Subjects: American politics; African-American culture; current events; human sexuality; marriage; pop culture; race relations; racism
- Website: chrisrock.com

Christopher Julius Rock (born February 7, 1965) is an American comedian, actor and filmmaker. He first gained prominence for his stand-up routines in the 1980s in which he tackled subjects including race relations, human sexuality, and observational comedy. His success branched off into productions in film, television, and on-stage, having received multiple accolades including three Grammy Awards for Best Comedy Album, four Primetime Emmy Awards, and a Golden Globe Award nomination. Rock was ranked No. 5 on Comedy Central's list of the 100 Greatest Stand-ups of All Time. He also ranked No. 5 on Rolling Stone's list of the 50 Best Stand-Up Comics of All Time.

After years working as a stand-up comedian and appearing in minor film roles including Beverly Hills Cop II (1987), Rock gained prominence as a cast member on the NBC sketch comedy series Saturday Night Live from 1990 to 1993. While at SNL, he appeared in the films New Jack City (1991) and Boomerang (1992). In 1993, he appeared in CB4, which he also wrote and produced. He reached mainstream stardom with Bring the Pain in 1996. Rock continued making specials which include Bigger & Blacker (1999), Never Scared (2004), Kill the Messenger (2008), Tamborine (2018), and Selective Outrage (2023). He developed, wrote, produced and narrated the live-action sitcom Everybody Hates Chris (2005–2009) and animated sitcom Everybody Still Hates Chris (2024-) which were both based on his early life. From 1997 to 2000, HBO aired his talk show The Chris Rock Show.

Rock was cast in starring film roles in Lethal Weapon 4 (1998), Dogma (1999), The Longest Yard (2005), the Madagascar franchise (2005–2012), I Think I Love My Wife (2007), Grown Ups (2010), Death at a Funeral (2010), Top Five (2014), The Week Of (2018), Spiral (2021), Amsterdam (2022), and Rustin (2023). He has taken roles on television including Empire, Kevin Can Wait, and Fargo. He made his Broadway theater debut in the 2011 Stephen Adly Guirgis play The Motherfucker with the Hat. He has hosted the Academy Awards twice, in 2005 and 2016, and was involved in a highly controversial incident in which he was assaulted by Will Smith at the 2022 Awards.

== Early life ==
Rock was born in Andrews, South Carolina, on February 7, 1965. Shortly after he was born, his family moved to the Crown Heights neighborhood of Brooklyn, New York. When he was six years old, they relocated and settled in a yellow brick house in the working class neighborhood of Bedford–Stuyvesant, which Rock refers to as "one of the most famous ghettos in the world." His mother, Rosalie (née Tingman), was a teacher and social worker for people with developmental disabilities; his father, Julius Rock, was a truck driver for The Daily News and newspaper deliveryman. Julius died in 1988 after ulcer surgery.

Rock is the eldest of his parents' seven children (six boys and one girl: Andre (b. 1967), Tony (b. 1974), Brian (b. 1976), Kenny (b. 1979), Andi (b. 1985) and Jordan (b. 1991)), and he had an older paternal half-brother, Charles "Shabazz" Ledell Rock (b. 1953), who died in 2006 after suffering from alcoholism. Rock's younger brothers Tony, Kenny, and Jordan are also in the entertainment business.

Rock's family history was profiled on the PBS series African American Lives 2 in 2008. A DNA test revealed that he is of Cameroonian descent, specifically from the Udeme people of northern Cameroon. Rock's great-great-grandfather, Julius Caesar Tingman, was enslaved for 21 years before he served in the American Civil War as part of the Union Army's United States Colored Troops, and then later was elected to two terms in the South Carolina House of Representatives. During the 1940s, Rock's paternal grandfather moved from South Carolina to New York City to become a taxicab driver and preacher.

Rock, who was as he describes it "a little .. skinny runt," was bullied starting in the second grade in 1972. He was bused to two schools in predominantly poor, white neighborhoods of Brooklyn, Public School 277 in Gerritsen Beach, and Marine Park Junior High School in Marine Park, where he endured bullying and beatings from white students. He said: "I was a fucking nerdy motherfucker. So, you know, I was bullied pretty bad, but if I went to a black school, I'd probably got bullied too." He recalled later that: "They all cursed. The bad black kids cursed, and the white kids cursed in general conversation. It was another world -- Italian, Irish. They pretty much picked on me and the Jews."

Rock then attended James Madison High School, but dropped out in 1982 at 17 years of age. He later earned a General Educational Development (GED) high-school-equivalency diploma. Rock then worked various jobs at fast-food restaurants, including as a busboy at a Red Lobster. He attended Kingsborough Community College in Brooklyn for one year and studied communications.

== Career ==
=== 1984–1999: Saturday Night Live and standup ===
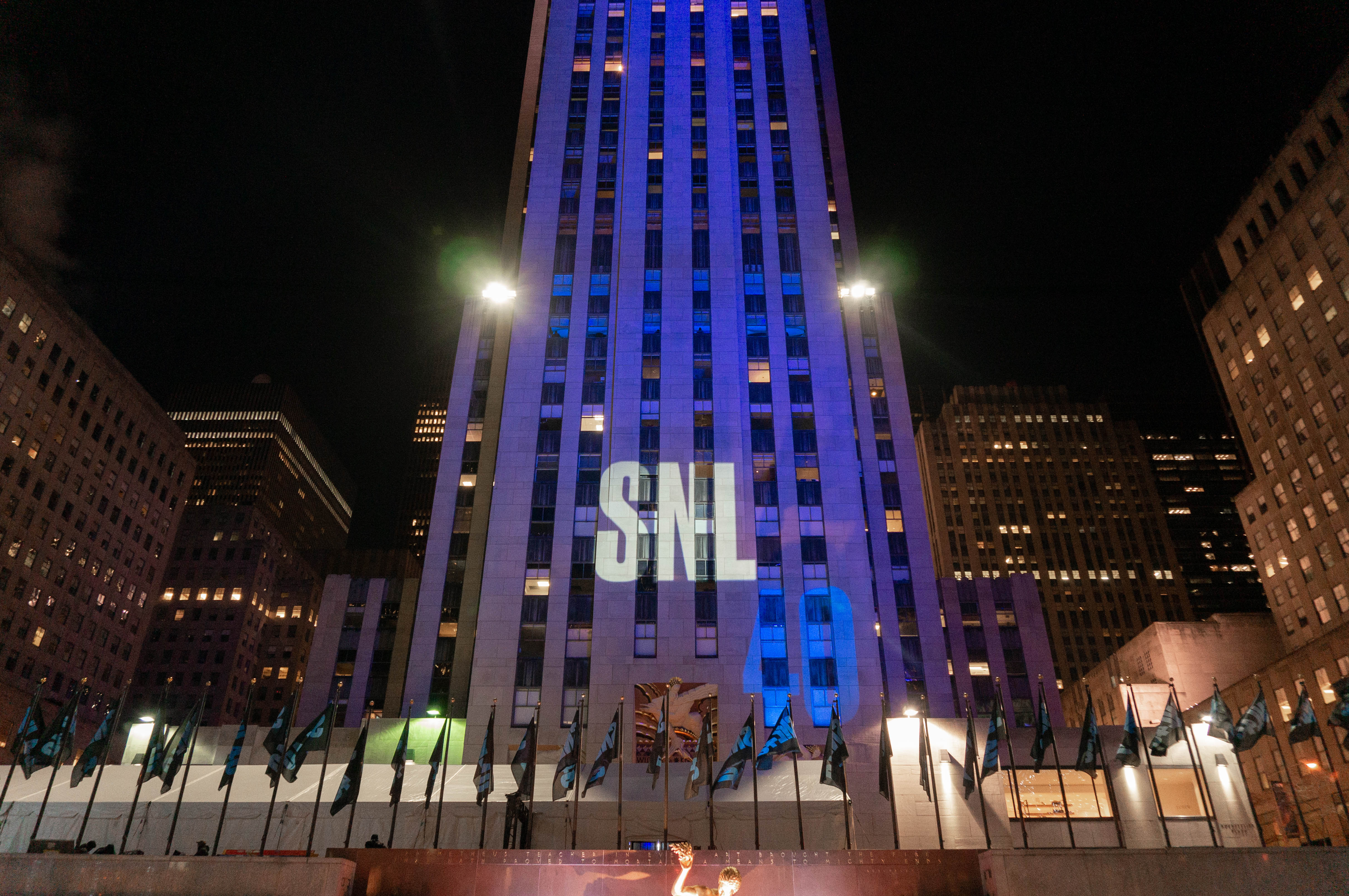
Rock was a cast member on Saturday Night Live (1990–1993).

Rock began working as a stand-up comic during 1984 in New York City's Catch a Rising Star. Upon seeing his act at a nightclub, Eddie Murphy befriended and mentored the aspiring comic. Murphy gave Rock his first film role and big break in Beverly Hills Cop II (1987). Rock rose up the ranks of the comedy circuit in addition to earning bit roles in the film I'm Gonna Git You Sucka (1988) and the TV series Miami Vice.

Rock was a cast member of the sketch comedy series Saturday Night Live from 1990 to 1993. He and other new cast members Chris Farley, Adam Sandler, Rob Schneider and David Spade became known as the Bad Boys of SNL. In 1991, he released his first comedy album, Born Suspect and won acclaim for his role as a crack addict in the film New Jack City. His tenure on SNL gave Rock national exposure. (Rock has hosted SNL four times: in 1996, 2014, 2020 and 2024.)

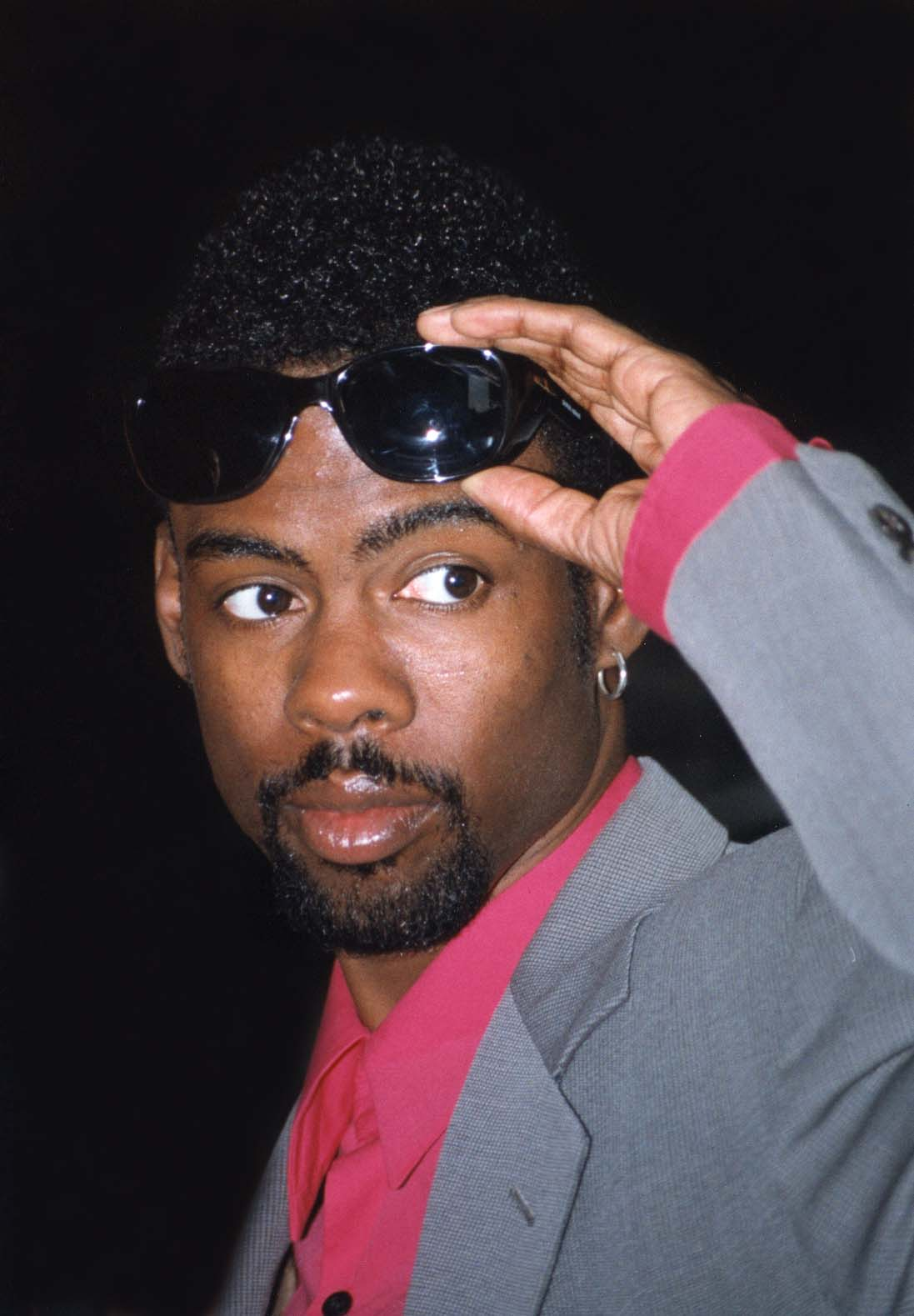
Rock in 1995

With plans to leave Saturday Night Live after the 1992–93 season, Rock was effectively "fired" from the show. Beginning that fall, he appeared in six episodes of the predominantly African American sketch show In Living Color as a special guest star. The show was canceled a month after he arrived. Rock then wrote and starred in the low-budget comedy CB4, which made $18 million against its budget of $6 million. He signed on as client of 3 Arts Entertainment.

Rock headlined his first HBO comedy special in 1994, titled Big Ass Jokes, as part of HBO Comedy Half-Hour. His second special, 1996's Bring the Pain, made Rock one of the most acclaimed and commercially successful comedians in the industry. Rock won two Emmy Awards for the special and gained large critical acclaim. A controversial part of the special was "Niggas vs. Black People". For his much-publicized role as a commentator for Comedy Central's Politically Incorrect during the 1996 Presidential elections, he earned another Emmy nomination. Rock also was the voice for the "Lil Penny" puppet who was the alter ego to basketball star Penny Hardaway in a series of Nike shoe commercials from 1994 to 1998, and hosted the 1997 MTV Video Music Awards. Rock's first music video was for his song "Your Mother's Got a Big Head" from his album Born Suspect. Rock also made videos for his songs "Champagne" from Roll With the New and "No Sex (In the Champagne Room)" from Bigger & Blacker.

Rock later had two more HBO comedy specials: Bigger & Blacker in 1999, and Never Scared in 2004. Articles relating to both specials called Rock "the funniest man in America" in Time and Entertainment Weekly. HBO also aired his talk show, The Chris Rock Show, which gained critical acclaim for Rock's interviews with celebrities and politicians. The show won an Emmy for writing. His television work has won him a total of three Emmy Awards and 15 nominations. By the end of the decade, Rock was established as one of the preeminent stand-up comedians and comic minds of his generation. During this time, Rock also translated his comedy into print form in the book Rock This! and released the Grammy Award-winning comedy albums, Roll with the New, Bigger & Blacker and Never Scared. Rock's fifth HBO special, Kill the Messenger, premiered on September 27, 2008, and won him another Emmy for outstanding writing for a variety or music program.

It was not until the success of his stand-up act in the late 1990s that Rock began receiving leading man status in films. He began the decade with supporting roles in such films as New Jack City as crack addict Pookie, in the Murphy-led comedy Boomerang (1992), the Steve Martin comedy Sgt. Bilko (1996) as well as Beverly Hills Ninja (1997), and Lethal Weapon 4 (1998). He also appeared in the Kevin Smith's fantasy comedy film Dogma (1999). The film received positive reviews and premiered at the 1999 Cannes Film Festival. The film starred an ensemble cast with actors such as Ben Affleck, Matt Damon, Jason Lee, Jason Mewes, Alan Rickman, Salma Hayek, Linda Fiorentino and George Carlin.

=== 2000–2009: Sitcom and stardom ===
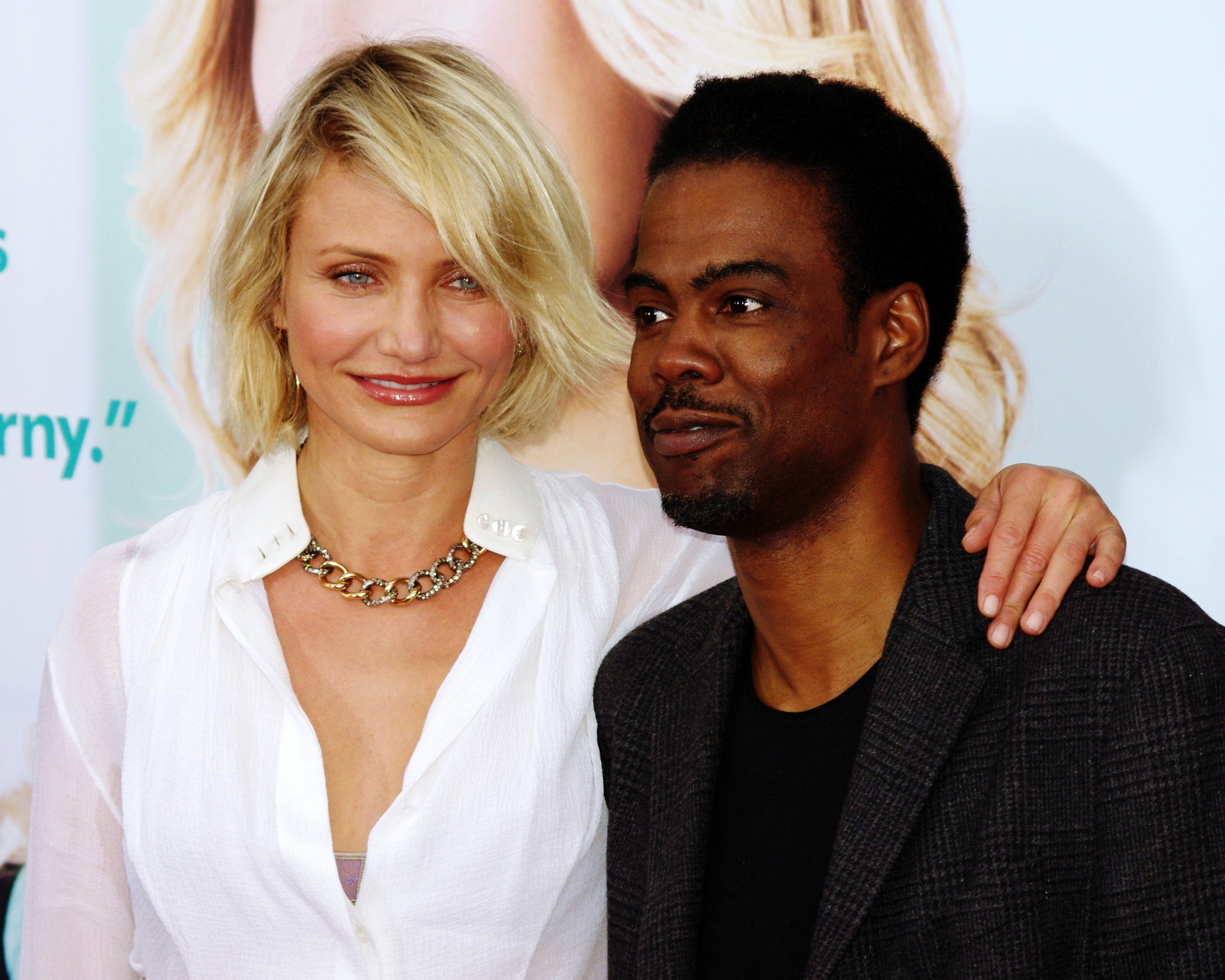
Cameron Diaz and Rock in 2012 at the premiere of What to Expect When You're Expecting

Rock then starred in the dark comedy Nurse Betty (2000) starring Renée Zellweger, Greg Kinnear and Morgan Freeman which also debuted at the Cannes on May 11, 2000. The film was a critical success. In the later 2000s, Rock started to work increasingly behind the camera. He wrote the film Down to Earth (2001) along with friend and comedian Louis C.K. The film was based on the Warren Beatty film, Heaven Can Wait (1978). That same year Rock also produced and starred in the C.K. directed film Pootie Tang (2001). Rock also would work as a writer and director of the political comedy Head of State (2003) and marital comedy I Think I Love My Wife (2007). He also played the lead in both films. He also went on to star in films like The Longest Yard (2005) opposite Sandler, and the action comedy film Bad Company (2002) opposite Anthony Hopkins.

Everybody Hates Chris (2005–2009)

In September 2005, the UPN television network premiered a comedy series called Everybody Hates Chris, loosely based on Rock's school days, for which he was the executive producer and narrator. The show garnered both critical and ratings success. The series was nominated for a 2006 Golden Globe for Best TV Series (Musical or Comedy), a 2006 People's Choice Award for Favorite New Television Comedy, and two 2006 Primetime Emmy Awards for costuming and cinematography.

Starting in 2005, Rock has also voiced the eccentric zebra Marty in DreamWorks' animated film franchise Madagascar. He starred in two of the film's sequels, Madagascar: Escape 2 Africa (2008), and Madagascar 3: Europe's Most Wanted (2012). In 2007, Rock voiced Mooseblood the Mosquito in DreamWorks' Jerry Seinfeld-led animated film, Bee Movie.

In 2009, Rock released his first documentary, 2009's Good Hair. The film focuses on the issue of how African-American women have perceived their hair and historically styled it. The film explores the current styling industry for black women, images of what is considered acceptable and desirable for African American women's hair in the United States, and their relation to African-American culture. The film premiered at the 2009 Sundance Film Festival where it earned critical acclaim and received a Special Jury Prize. The National Board of Review named it one of the five best documentaries of the year. Rock was also nominated for the Gotham Award for Best Documentary and for the Best Documentary Screenplay at the 62nd Writers Guild of America Awards. Rock has since stated working on a documentary about debt called Credit Is the Devil.

=== 2010–2019: Career expansion ===
Some of his 2010s film appearances include the black comedy Death at a Funeral (2010), a remake of the British comedy of the same name. The film also starred Peter Dinklage, Martin Lawrence, Tracy Morgan, Kevin Hart, Zoe Saldaña, and Luke Wilson. The film received mixed reviews, although Roger Ebert, critic of The Chicago Sun-Times, praised the film writing: "I laughed all the way through, in fact. This is the best comedy since The Hangover, and although it's almost a scene-by-scene remake of a 2007 British movie with the same title, it's funnier than the original." Rock also starred in the summer comedy Grown Ups (2010) alongside Sandler, Schneider, Spade, Kevin James and Maya Rudolph, and reunited with them for a sequel in 2013.

In 2011, Rock appeared on Broadway in Stephen Adly Guirgis' play The Motherfucker with the Hat with Bobby Cannavale and Annabella Sciorra. Rock was nominated for a Drama League Award. In an interview with Vibe magazine, Rock stated that he chose to do Broadway because he wanted more people to see him "really act. Sometimes when you do comedy, that can be a little formulaic, and it's hard for really good directors to see that you can act."

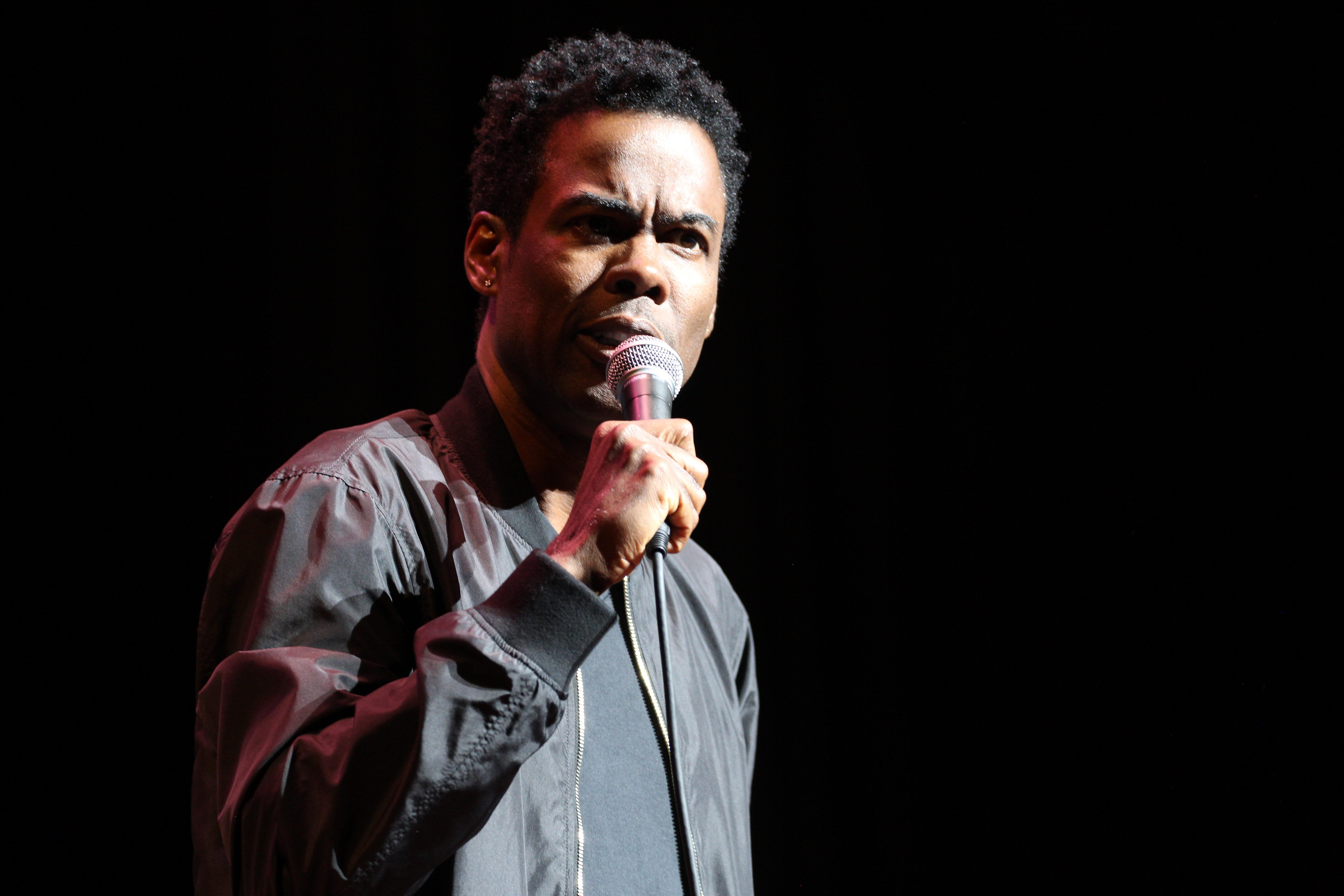
Rock performing in 2017

He produced the series Totally Biased with W. Kamau Bell, which premiered in August 2012. While serving as producer, he had a production company, Chris Rock Enterprises (or CR Enterprises) for short. In 2012, he starred in the ensemble romantic comedy film What to Expect When You're Expecting alongside Cameron Diaz, Jennifer Lopez, Anna Kendrick, and Elizabeth Banks. Despite earning negative reviews, the film was a financial success. Rock earned a Teen Choice Award for Choice Movie Actor – Comedy nomination for his performance. That same year he starred in the romantic comedy 2 Days in New York (2012) opposite Julie Delpy. The film served as the sequel to Delpy's previous film, 2 Days in Paris (2007). The film premiered at the Sundance Film Festival where it received positive reviews, with critics praising the chemistry between the two with Todd McCarthy of The Hollywood Reporter writing: "The best of the humor is verbal and attitudinal, all delivered at a rapid clip in overlapping languages that Preston Sturges or Howard Hawks would have admired."

In 2014, Rock scripted, directed and starred in the film Top Five, which critics have drawn comparison to Woody Allen's Stardust Memories (1980). The film is a social commentary on fame and society. The film premiered at the 2014 Toronto International Film Festival. Scott Foundas, critic for Variety praised the film writing: "Rock has finally found a big-screen vehicle for himself that comes close to capturing the electric wit, shrewd social observations and deeply autobiographical vein of his standup comedy." In Rolling Stone magazine, Peter Travers wrote in his review: "Rock delivers the laughs, big ones, laced with razor-sharp observations on everything from pop culture to racial politics... His confident, prowling wit as a stand-up has finally found its way to the screen, enhanced by a bracing vulnerability. Top Five is Rock's best movie by a mile."

In 2015 Rock attended the Saturday Night Live 40th Anniversary Special on NBC where he introduced and paid tribute to fellow comedian and former SNL cast member Murphy. Also in 2015, Rock appeared as himself in Sofia Coppola's Christmas musical special, A Very Murray Christmas starring Bill Murray. In the film, Rock sings "Do You Hear What I Hear?" with Murray. The film debuted on Netflix and received the Primetime Emmy Award for Outstanding Television Movie. He also appeared as himself in another Netflix film, Sandy Wexler (2017) with Sandler again. In 2018, he starred in the Netflix comedy The Week Of directed by Robert Smigel opposite Sandler. The film follows two fathers during the week of the wedding of their children.

The following year, he briefly appeared in the comedy film Dolemite Is My Name (2019) starring Murphy. In the film, Murphy portrayed Rudy Ray Moore and centers around his career as a standup, and director of blaxploitation starting with Dolemite (1975). The film premiered at the 2019 Toronto International Film Festival. He directed and appeared in the music video for the Red Hot Chili Peppers song "Hump de Bump," and has simply appeared in several videos, including the Big Daddy Kane music video "Smooth Operator" as a guy getting his hair cut, one of the many celebrities seen lip-synching in Johnny Cash's "God's Gonna Cut You Down," a cameo in Madonna's "Bitch I'm Madonna," and as a Wild West sheriff chasing down an 1889 cowboy version of Lil Nas X in "Old Town Road".

On October 30, 2016, Netflix announced that they would be releasing two new stand-up comedy specials from Rock, with Rock being paid $40 million per special. The first special, Chris Rock: Tamborine, was released on Netflix on February 14, 2018. It was filmed at the Brooklyn Academy of Music and was directed by comedian Bo Burnham. The specials marked the comedian's first concert specials released in 10 years. The special earned a Grammy Award for Best Comedy Album nomination.

=== 2020–present: Recents projects ===
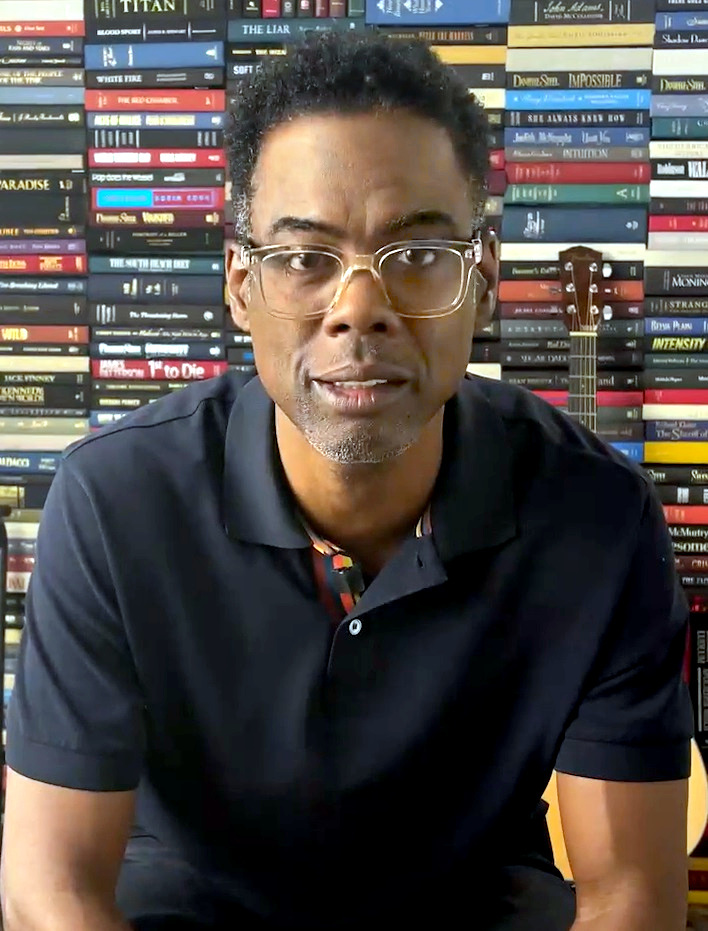
Rock in 2021.

In 2020, Rock portrayed central character Loy Cannon in the fourth season of the FX crime anthology series Fargo. In 2021, he starred in a spin-off of the Saw franchise, Spiral (2021), which dabbled him into the territory of the horror film genre. Rock responded to the Will Smith slap in his March 4, 2023, Netflix special Chris Rock: Selective Outrage; it was Netflix's first-ever live event. The show streamed live from the Hippodrome Theatre in Baltimore, Maryland. The special received three Primetime Emmy Award nominations including two for Rock for Outstanding Variety Special (Live) and Outstanding Writing for a Variety Special.

In 2023, it was announced that Rock would direct a biopic on civil rights leader Martin Luther King Jr. with Steven Spielberg producing. The film will be based on the biography King: A Life by Jonathan Eig.

In 2024, it was announced that Rock would direct an English language adaptation of Thomas Vinterberg's Academy Award-winning film Another Round (2020). Rock wrote and directed the upcoming film, Misty Green, was shown in November 2024 at the American Film Market. The film premieres in October 2026, at Toronto International Film Festival (TIFF).

== Academy Awards ==
=== 2005 ceremony ===
In February 2005, Rock hosted the 77th Academy Awards ceremony. The decision to have Rock host the awards was seen by some as a chance to bring an "edge" to the ceremony, and to make it more relevant or appealing to younger audiences. Jokingly, Rock opened by saying "Welcome to the 77th and LAST Academy Awards!" During one segment Rock asked, "Who is this guy?" in reference to actor Jude Law seemingly appearing in every movie Rock had seen that year and implied Law was a low-rent Tom Cruise (he made a joke about filmmakers rushing production when unable to get the actors they want: "If you want Tom Cruise and all you can get is Jude Law, wait [to make the film]!"). Subsequently, an angry Sean Penn took the stage to present and said, "In answer to our host's question, Jude Law is one of our finest young actors." (At the time, Penn and Law were shooting All the King's Men.) Law was not the only actor that Rock roasted that evening, however—he turned the joke on himself at one point, saying, "If you want Denzel [Washington] and all you can get is me, wait!" Older Academy officials were reportedly displeased with Rock's performance, which did not elevate ratings for the ceremony. Rock was also criticized for referring to the Oscars as "idiotic", and asserting that heterosexual men do not watch them, in an interview prior to Oscar night. Rob Sheffield of Rolling Stone ranked the Oscar hosts and placed Rock at number one, calling him the "greatest awards show host ever" who was "on fire all night," adding, "He brought the pain to the Oscars, skewering Hollywood glitz while also celebrating it, even if he hurt Sean Penn's feelings."

=== 2016 ceremony ===
On October 21, 2015, the Academy of Motion Picture Arts and Sciences announced Rock would host the 88th Academy Awards the following February. When the subsequent acting nominations turned out to include no racial minorities, Rock was called upon to join a boycott of the ceremony. Rock declined, stating at the ceremony that it would have accomplished little since the show would have proceeded anyway, with him simply replaced. Instead, Rock spoke of his concerns about the lack of diversity in AMPAS at various times during the show, closing by saying "Black Lives Matter."

Rock's performance was largely praised by critics. Los Angeles Times critic Mary McNamara wrote: "Rock's Oscars had some of the most powerful moments seen in the telecast's history. His decision to honestly answer the question 'Is Hollywood racist?' was brave and effective," The New York Times television critic James Poniewozik, praised Rock's performance for being "evenhanded without being wishy-washy" and that he represented "an example of something the industry is still trying to learn: that you can achieve both inclusion and entertainment by giving the right person just the right opportunity."

=== 2022 ceremony ===
Rock presented the award for Best Documentary Feature at the 94th Academy Awards in March 2022. During the ceremony, Rock joked about Jada Pinkett Smith's shaved head, which he compared to Demi Moore's shaved head in G.I. Jane, saying, "Jada, I love ya. G.I. Jane 2, can't wait to see it!" Pinkett Smith had shaved her head due to alopecia areata. Her husband, Will Smith, responded to Rock's joke by walking onstage and slapping Rock, who remarked, "Will Smith just smacked the shit out of me." Smith then returned to his seat and yelled twice at Rock, "Keep my wife's name out your fucking mouth!" Rock went on to say that this "was the greatest night in the history of television." Later in the night, Smith was named Best Actor for King Richard. In his acceptance speech, he apologized to the Academy and the other nominees, but not to Rock. Rock declined to file a report with the Los Angeles Police Department regarding the incident.

The next day, amid public backlash, Smith issued a formal apology to Rock via a public Instagram post, adding that "a joke about Jada's medical condition was too much for me to bear and I reacted emotionally." He also stated that "I was out of line" and that his behavior was "unacceptable and inexcusable... I will always be here for you whenever you are ready to talk about it." During a stand-up performance in Boston later that month, Rock stated that Smith had not contacted him personally and they had not spoken since the ceremony.

== Comedic style and views ==
Rock's subject matter typically involves family, politics, romance, music, celebrities, and race relations in the United States. Though not strictly autobiographical, much of his comic standpoint seems rooted in his teenage experience; his strict parents, concerned about the inadequacies of the local school system, arranged to have the adolescent Rock bused to a nearly all-white high school in Bensonhurst. In his memoir Rock This, he recalls, "My parents assumed I'd get a better education in a better neighborhood. What I actually got was a worse education in a worse neighborhood. And a whole bunch of ass-whippings."

Rock has not wavered from a position explored in his 1996 Roll With The New show, and reiterated in his 1997 memoir: "Why does the public expect entertainers to behave better than everybody else? It's ridiculous [ . . . of] course, this is just for black entertainers. You don't see anyone telling Jerry Seinfeld he's a good role model. Because everyone expects whites to behave themselves [ . . . nowadays,] you've got to be an entertainer and a leader. It's too much." Often the subject of tabloids, when asked about paparazzi and the other negative aspects of fame, Rock says he accepts the bad with the good: "You can't be happy that fire cooks your food and be mad it burns your fingertips."

At the London Live Earth concert on July 7, 2007, which was broadcast live on the BBC, before introducing the Red Hot Chili Peppers, Rock called the crowd "motherfuckers" and said "shit", and after a brief pause said he was joking. Due to the broadcast being at 5:45 p.m., Rock was immediately cut off, and the BBC made several apologies for his use of the word "motherfucker".

Rock has been an avid fan of the New York Mets baseball team since childhood. He complained that his team "had no money" during a 2011 interview with David Letterman.

During a 2008 rant on his Kill the Messenger tour, Rock labeled George W. Bush as "the worst president ever".

Rock has campaigned against the racial profiling of African-Americans, and often speaks of the everyday racism he experiences “despite being famous”. In a 2013 episode of Comedians in Cars Getting Coffee with Jerry Seinfeld, Rock and Seinfeld are pulled over by the police for speeding while Seinfeld was driving. In the episode Rock admits to Seinfeld that "If you weren't here, I'd be scared. Yeah, I'm famous – still black." In 2015, Rock was pulled over three times in the first three months of the year. Each time Rock posted a selfie of the incident, without further comment as to the reason for the stops or whether he was issued a citation.

In May 2021, Rock voiced opposition to cancel culture. He said that it has led to "boring" and "unfunny" material from comedians. He also commented that there is an existing built-in mechanism for audiences informing comedians that their content does not work, like the audience not laughing at their jokes. Rock went on to say "Everybody's scared to make a move. That's not a place to be. You know, we should have the right to fail because failure . . . failure is a part of art."

Rock has said that he was influenced by the performing style of his paternal grandfather, Allen Rock, a preacher. Rock's comedy influences are Bill Cosby, Redd Foxx, Dick Gregory, Flip Wilson, Richard Pryor, Steve Martin, Pigmeat Markham, Woody Allen, Bill Maher, Eddie Murphy, Sam Kinison, George Carlin, Mort Sahl, and Rodney Dangerfield.

Comedians who have cited Rock as an influence include Dave Chappelle, Christian Finnegan, George Lopez, Kevin Hart, and Trevor Noah.

== Personal life ==
=== Relationships ===
Rock married Malaak Compton-Rock on November 23, 1996. Compton-Rock is the founder and executive director of StyleWorks, a non-profit, full-service hair salon that provides free services for women leaving welfare and entering the workforce. The couple lived in Alpine, New Jersey with their two daughters. In December 2014, Rock filed for divorce from Compton-Rock. Rock admitted to infidelity in the marriage, as well as struggling with a pornography addiction. The divorce was finalized on August 22, 2016.

On July 7, 2022, it was reported that Rock had started dating actress, screenwriter, and director Lake Bell. Rock later described himself as single in his 2023 Netflix special.

=== Religion ===
According to Dylan Novak, a Protestant preacher known by the online alias Celebrity Preacher, he had an interaction with Rock where he learned that Rock's faith "did not stick with him as he grew up". In a 1989 stand-up routine, Rock remarked, "When you're black there's like no religion to turn to... It's like, Christianity? I don't think so. White people justified slavery and segregation through Christianity so a black Christian is like a black person with no... memory."

According to Vibe, in 2017, Rock stated during his Total Blackout Tour that he was "trying to get a little bit of religion... Not a lot," and that he wanted to "find God before God finds me". He also said that he believed in God a little bit but that he practices the religion of comedy.

=== Cannabis ===
On August 20, 2019, Rock, along with several other celebrities, invested in a funding round for Lowell Herb Co, a California cannabis brand. He is known to be "a dedicated cannabis consumer".

=== Health ===
On September 18, 2020, Rock said that he was diagnosed with a non-verbal learning disorder, a neurological condition that makes it difficult for him to understand non-verbal social cues.

== Discography ==
=== Live albums ===
| Title | Album details | Peak chart positions | |
| Title | Album details | US | US R&B /HH |
|---|---|---|---|
| Born Suspect | Released: May 24, 1991; Label: Atlantic; Format: CD, cassette, LP | — | — |
| Roll with the New | Released: April 8, 1997; Label: DreamWorks; Format: CD, cassette, LP | 93 | 41 |
| Bigger & Blacker | Released: July 13, 1999; Label: DreamWorks; Format: CD, cassette, LP | 44 | 23 |
| Never Scared | Released: February 15, 2005; Label: DreamWorks, Geffen; Format: CD, cassette, LP | — | — |

=== Guest features on albums ===
Rock has appeared on numerous albums, including Kanye West's My Beautiful Dark Twisted Fantasy, Method Man's Tical 2000: Judgement Day, Prince Paul's A Prince Among Thieves, Ice Cube's War and Peace Vol. 2, Ludacris's Theater of the Mind, Busta Rhymes's Extinction Level Event 2: The Wrath of God, and Ol' Dirty Bastard's second studio album.

=== Stand-up specials ===
- Chris Rock: Big Ass Jokes (released on HBO, 1994)
- Chris Rock: Bring the Pain (released on HBO, 1996)
- Chris Rock: Bigger & Blacker (released on HBO, 1999)
- Chris Rock: Never Scared (released on HBO, 2004)
- Chris Rock: Kill the Messenger (released on HBO, 2008)
- Chris Rock: Tamborine (released on Netflix 2018)
- Chris Rock: Selective Outrage (released on Netflix 2023)

== Bibliography ==
- Rock This! (Hyperion Books, 1997) – ISBN 0786862890
