= Chris Rock: Kill the Messenger =

2008 American TV special

- Genre: Stand-up comedy
- Written by: Chris Rock
- Directed by: Marty Callner
- Starring: Chris Rock
- Country of origin: United States
- Original language: English

Production
- Executive producer: Chris Rock
- Producers: Marty Callner; Randall Gladstein
- Editor: Michael D. Schultz
- Running time: 79 minutes
- Production companies: CR Enterprises; Funny Business Productions

Original release
- Network: HBO
- Release: September 27, 2008

Chris Rock: Kill the Messenger is a television special that premiered on HBO on September 27, 2008, starring comedian Chris Rock. This is Chris Rock's fifth comedy special and the final one for HBO. It was edited together from three performances: one at the Carnival City Casino in Johannesburg, one at the Hammersmith Apollo in London and one at the Apollo Theater in New York City.

== Reception ==
Kill the Messenger won two Emmy Awards, including one for Outstanding Writing for a Variety, Music or Comedy Special.
