= HBO Comedy Half Hour =

- Genre: Stand-up comedy
- Country of origin: United States
- Original language: English
- No. of seasons: 4
- No. of episodes: 34

Production
- Running time: 30 minutes

Original release
- Network: HBO
- Release: June 16, 1994 – January 16, 1998

HBO Comedy Half Hour is a stand-up comedy television series on HBO. Episodes were usually recorded at The Fillmore in San Francisco, California, with the format of a single comedian presenting a routine for thirty minutes.

The series aired on HBO from June 16, 1994 to January 16, 1998, and was preceded and succeeded by HBO Presents One Night Stand which aired from February 1989 to November 1992 and from August to October 2005.

== Episode listing ==
=== Season 1 (1994) ===
No. overall	No. in season	Title	Original release date
1	1	Chris Rock	June 16, 1994
2	2	D.L. Hughley	June 23, 1994
3	3	Simply Marvalous	June 30, 1994
4	4	Carlos Mencia	July 7, 1994
5	5	Suzanne Westenhoefer	July 14, 1994
6	6	Bob Smith	July 14, 1994
7	7	Eddie Griffin	July 21, 1994
8	8	Margaret Cho	July 28, 1994

=== Season 2 (1995) ===
No. overall	No. in season	Title	Original release date
9	1	Steve Harvey	August 10, 1995
10	2	Dana Gould	August 17, 1995
11	3	Judy Gold	August 24, 1995
12	4	Bobcat Goldthwait	August 31, 1995
13	5	Marc Maron	September 7, 1995
14	6	Jonathan Katz	September 14, 1995
15	7	Janeane Garofalo	September 21, 1995
16	8	Carlos Mencia	September 28, 1995

=== Season 3 (1996) ===
No. overall	No. in season	Title	Original release date
17	1	Jeff Cesario	August 9, 1996
18	2	Dave Attell	August 16, 1996
19	3	Wendy Liebman	August 23, 1996
20	4	Ralph Louis Harris	August 30, 1996
21	5	Ray Romano	September 6, 1996
22	6	Laura Kightlinger	September 13, 1996
23	7	Jack Coen	September 20, 1996
24	8	Louis C.K.	September 27, 1996
25	9	Adele Givens	October 4, 1996
26	10	Jeff Stilson	October 11, 1996
27	11	Kathy Griffin	October 18, 1996
28	12	David Cross	October 25, 1996

=== Season 4 (1997) ===
No. overall	No. in season	Title	Original release date
29	1	Warren Hutcherson	December 1, 1997
30	2	Patton Oswalt	December 8, 1997
31	3	Kathleen Madigan	December 15, 1997
32	4	Harland Williams	December 22, 1997
33	5	Dave Chappelle	January 9, 1998
34	6	Jeff Garlin	January 16, 1998
