= Larry Rickles =

American screenwriter and producer (1970–2011)

- Born: Lawrence Rickles; May 12, 1970; Los Angeles, California, U.S.
- Died: December 3, 2011 (aged 41); Los Angeles, California, U.S.
- Occupations: Screenwriter; producer
- Years active: 1996–2011
- Father: Don Rickles

Lawrence Rickles (May 12, 1970 – December 3, 2011) was an American screenwriter and film and television producer. He won an Emmy Award in 2008 for his work on Mr. Warmth: The Don Rickles Project, a documentary about his father, actor and comedian Don Rickles.

== Early life ==
Rickles was born on May 12, 1970, in Los Angeles. Don said on an episode of The Tonight Show Starring Johnny Carson that Barbara conceived Larry while he was on set in the Istrian village of Vižinada in the former Yugoslavia (now Istria, Croatia), while filming Kelly's Heroes in July 1969. He was the brother of actress Mindy Rickles.

== Career ==
Rickles began his career by working on set at several sitcoms. He was an actor in the 1999 movie David and Lola. He was a member of the Writers Guild of America, West. He won admission into a Warner Bros. writing workshop in 1996, and the following year he was hired as a television writer for the CBS comedy series Murphy Brown.

Rickles co-produced the 2007 HBO documentary about his father, Mr. Warmth: The Don Rickles Project. The documentary won a Primetime Emmy for Outstanding Variety, Music, or Comedy Special in 2008 and Rickles received an Emmy for his work. Rickles' father also won a Primetime Emmy Award for Individual Performance in a Variety or Music Program for his appearance in the film.

== Death ==
Rickles died of respiratory failure due to pneumonia in Los Angeles on December 3, 2011, at the age of 41.
