= Don Rickles: One Night Only =

- Written by: Lewis Freeman, John Macks, and Bill Scheft
- Directed by: Joe DeMaio and Jeff Roe
- Starring: Don Rickles; Jerry Seinfeld; Jon Stewart; Tina Fey; Amy Poehler; Robert De Niro; Martin Scorsese; David Letterman
- Country of origin: United States
- Original language: English

Production
- Producer: John Skidmore
- Running time: 2 hours

Original release
- Network: Spike TV
- Release: May 28, 2014

Don Rickles: One Night Only is a television special dedicated to the life and career of comedian Don Rickles. The event was filmed live at the Apollo Theater in New York. The special is hosted by Jerry Seinfeld and features clips from Don's career in Hollywood, as well as tributes from comedians and collaborators. The special ran 2 hours and aired on May 28, 2014, on Spike TV.

Those who honored Rickles included Jon Stewart, Tina Fey, Amy Poehler, Tracy Morgan, Regis Philbin, Robert De Niro, Martin Scorsese and David Letterman. The special also featured video messages from friends and collaborators along with clips from his late-night appearances, interviews, stand-up material and television performances.

== Summary ==
The star studded two hour special guided by host Jerry Seinfeld features video tributes from fellow comedians, archival standup comedy footage and performances from film and television as well as tributes and roasts from fellow comedians and television personalities. The show ended with Don Rickles roasting everyone in return from his seat with no cue cards, or teleprompter.

== Participants ==
Various comedians and collaborators appeared to roast Rickles in the special. Those who appeared in order of appearance:

- Jerry Seinfeld as host
- Jon Stewart
- Tracy Morgan
- Brian Williams
- Johnny Depp
- Regis Philbin
- Tina Fey and Amy Poehler
- Robert De Niro and Martin Scorsese

Interspersed through the show included video messages from:

- Ray Romano and Brad Garrett
- Bill Cosby
- Eddie Murphy
- Jimmy Kimmel
- Bob Newhart

Various celebrities appeared in the crowd including, Nathan Lane, Allison Williams, John McEnroe, Jessica Williams, Wyatt Cenac, Amber Heard, and Harvey Weinstein.

== Production ==
Casey Patterson, Executive Producer and Executive Vice President of Event Production & Talent Development at Viacom Entertainment Group released a statement in announcing the special saying, "We’re thrilled that David Letterman, Jerry Seinfeld, Jon Stewart, Robert De Niro and so many more will be coming out to entertain and celebrate our hero – Don Rickles...The genius of Rickles is in the danger, nobody is safe, and what you can expect is a night of comedy from these superstars worthy of a legend. It truly will be One Night Only.”

The special was filmed at the Apollo Theatre two days before Rickles' 88th birthday. The special aired on Spike TV May 28, 2014. In 2017, Spike aired another roast style tribute to Alec Baldwin entitled, One Night Only: Alec Baldwin.

== Reception ==
In Hillary Busis' review in Entertainment Weekly, she praised the special writing, "the event was packed with laughs from beginning... Even more impressive: The octogenarian, famous for improvising putdowns, apparently performed his final set without the help of either notecards or the teleprompter." She criticized the special however for a few "old fashioned groaners".
