= Don Rickles Speaks! =

Studio album by Don Rickles
- Released: 1969
- Genres: Comedy, insult comedy
- Length: 36:48
- Label: Warner Bros. - Seven Arts Records
- Producer: Joe Smith

Don Rickles chronology
Hello Dummy! (1968)	Don Rickles Speaks! (1969)

Professional ratings
Review scores
Source	Rating
About.com	5/5 stars

Don Rickles Speaks! is a comedy album released in 1969 by Don Rickles. It begins with an introduction by G. Bernard Owens who tells the audience that the recording they are about to hear reveals the serious side of Rickles and his "thoughts of people, life, philosophy." Immediately after the introduction, we hear laughter, which completely contradicts what was heard previously. In the album, Rickles is interviewed by a panel of "eminent experts" who ask him about celebrities such as Dean Martin, Johnny Carson, Kirk Douglas, Robert Goulet, and Frank Sinatra, as well as such music acts as The Electric Prunes and Snooky Lanson.

== Track listing ==
Side one:

1. Current Events (3:09)
2. Some Good Friends (2:53)
3. Sinatra (2:49)
4. Names in the News (1:58)
5. Show Biz and Travel (3:14)
6. Night Clubs (4:09)

Side two:

1. Television (3:40)
2. Some Big Stars (3:12)
3. Sports (2:30)
4. Thoughts (3:15)
5. Capsule Comments (2:00)
6. Famous Men and Women (3:00)
