= Hello Dummy! =

Live album by Don Rickles
- Released: 1968
- Recorded: 1968, Sahara Hotel and Casino, Las Vegas, Nevada
- Genre: Comedy
- Length: 35:39
- Label: Warner Bros.
- Producer: Paul Tannen

Don Rickles chronology
Hello Dummy! (1968)	Don Rickles Speaks! (1969)

Hello Dummy! is a comedy album released by American comedian Don Rickles. It was recorded at the Sahara Hotel and Casino in Las Vegas, Nevada, and released in 1968. It peaked at No. 54 on the Billboard Top LPs music chart. In 2025, the album was chosen for preservation in the National Recording Registry for being "culturally, historically, or aesthetically significant" by the Library of Congress.

== Reception ==
Professional ratings
Review scores
Source	Rating
AllMusic	4/5 stars

In a retrospective review, Jason Ankeny of AllMusic rated Hello Dummy! explained that Rickles "steadfastly remains a true equal-opportunity offender, spitting out insults with the speed and force of a rivet gun and without regard to gender, race, creed, or sexuality" and that "Hello Dummy! captures Don Rickles at the peak of his vicious powers". He concluded: "While certainly never a comedic revolutionary on par with Lenny Bruce, Rickles somehow transcends political correctness so completely that he whips the crowd into a communal fervor worthy of a preacher."

== Track listing ==
1. "Hello Dummy!" – 35:39
