= Don Rickles =

American comedian and actor (1926–2017)

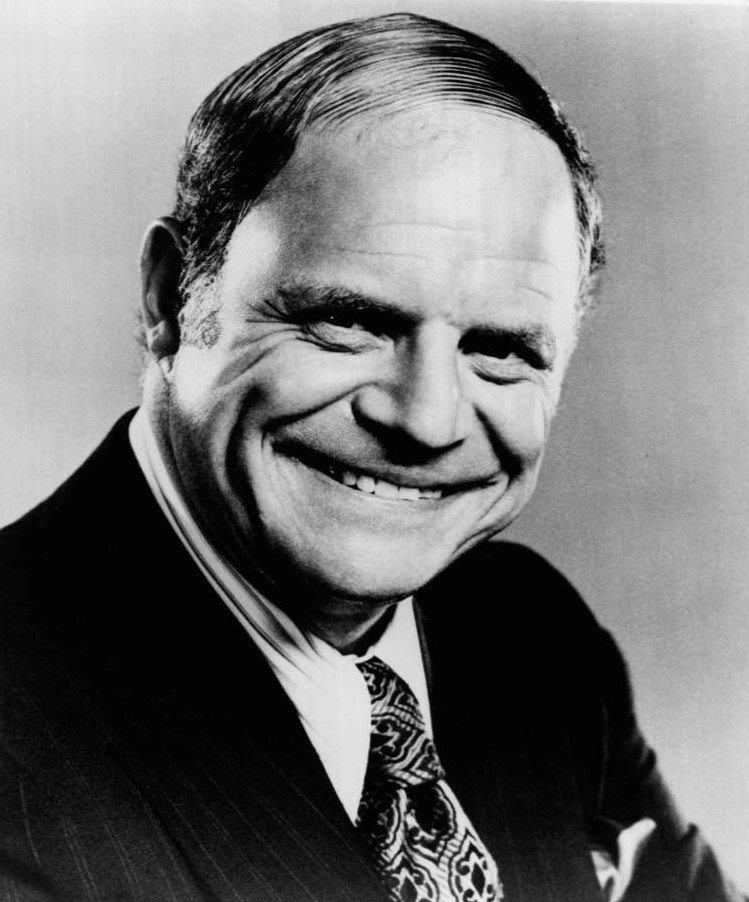
- Rickles in 1973
- Born: Donald Jay Rickles; May 8, 1926; Queens, New York, U.S.
- Died: April 6, 2017 (aged 90); Los Angeles, California, U.S.
- Resting place: Mount Sinai Memorial Park Cemetery
- Occupations: Stand-up comedian; actor
- Spouse: Barbara Sklar (m. 1965)
- Children: 2, including Larry

Comedy career
- Years active: 1955–2017
- Medium: Stand-up; film; television; books
- Genres: Observational comedy; insult comedy; black comedy; cringe comedy; shock humor; satire
- Subjects: American culture; self-deprecation; everyday life; religion; current events
- Website: donrickles.com
- Military career
- Allegiance: United States
- Branch: United States Navy
- Service years: 1944–1946
- Rank: Seaman first class
- Conflicts: World War II; Pacific War

Donald Jay Rickles (May 8, 1926 – April 6, 2017) was an American stand-up comedian and actor, known primarily for his insult comedy. His film roles include Run Silent, Run Deep (1958), Enter Laughing (1967), Kelly's Heroes (1970), and Casino (1995). From 1976 to 1978, he had a two-season starring role in the NBC television sitcom C.P.O. Sharkey, having previously starred in two eponymous half-hour programs, an ABC variety series titled The Don Rickles Show (1968) and a CBS sitcom identically titled The Don Rickles Show (1972).

A veteran headline performer at Las Vegas hotel-casinos and peripheral member of the Rat Pack via friendship with Frank Sinatra, he received widespread exposure as a frequent guest on talk and variety shows, including The Dean Martin Show, The Tonight Show Starring Johnny Carson, and Late Show with David Letterman, and voiced Mr. Potato Head in the first three films of the Toy Story franchise (1995–2010), with unused archival audio reused in Toy Story 4 (2019). He won a Primetime Emmy Award for the 2006 documentary film titled Mr. Warmth: The Don Rickles Project. In 2014, he was honored by fellow comedians in a show at the Apollo Theater, which was taped and released on Spike TV titled Don Rickles: One Night Only.

== Early life ==
Rickles was born in the Queens borough of New York City, on May 8, 1926, an only child to a Jewish family, and spoke Yiddish at home. His father, Max S. Rickles (1896–1952), emigrated in 1903 with his Lithuanian parents from Kaunas. His mother, Etta Rickles (née Feldman; 1898–1984), was born in New York City to Austrian immigrant parents. Rickles grew up in Jackson Heights.

After graduating from Newtown High School in 1944, Rickles enlisted in the United States Navy and served during World War II on the motor torpedo boat tender USS Cyrene as a seaman first class. He was honorably discharged in 1946. Two years later, intending to be a dramatic Shakespearean actor, he studied at the American Academy of Dramatic Arts, and then played bit parts on television. Frustrated by a lack of acting work, Rickles began to perform comedy in clubs in New York, Miami, and Los Angeles. He became known as an insult comedian when he responded to his hecklers. The audience enjoyed these insults more than his prepared material, so he incorporated them into his act.

When Rickles started his career in the early 1950s, he began to call ill-mannered members of the audience "hockey pucks". His style was similar to that of older insult comic Jack E. Leonard, though Rickles denied Leonard influenced his style. During an interview on Larry King Live, Rickles credited Milton Berle's comedy style for inspiring him to enter showbusiness.

== Career ==
=== Rise to fame ===
While working in the "Murray Franklin's" nightclub in Miami Beach, Florida, early during his career, Rickles spotted Frank Sinatra and remarked to him, "I just saw your movie The Pride and the Passion and I wanna tell you, the cannon's acting was great." He added, "Make yourself at home, Frank. Hit somebody!" Sinatra, whose pet name for Rickles was "bullet-head", enjoyed him so much that he encouraged other celebrities to see Rickles's act and be insulted by him. Sinatra's support helped Rickles become a popular headline performer in Las Vegas. During a Dean Martin Celebrity Roast special, Rickles was among those who took part in roasting Sinatra, and Rickles himself was also roasted during another show in the series.

Rickles earned the nicknames "The Merchant of Venom" and "Mr. Warmth" for his poking fun at people of all ethnicities and all walks of life. When he was introduced to an audience or on a television talk show, Spanish matador music, "La Virgen de la Macarena", would usually be played, subtly foreshadowing someone was about to be metaphorically gored. As Rickles observed, "I always pictured myself facing the audience as the matador."

In 1958, Rickles made his film debut in a serious part in Run Silent, Run Deep with Clark Gable and Burt Lancaster. Throughout the 1960s, he often appeared on television in sitcoms and dramatic series. Rickles guest-starred in Get Smart as Sid, an old war buddy of Max's, who comes to stay with him. In an episode of Run for Your Life, Rickles portrayed a distressed comedian whose act culminates in him strangling a patron while imploring the patron to "Laugh!" Rickles took a dramatic turn in the low-budget Roger Corman science-fiction/horror film X: The Man with the X-Ray Eyes as a carnival barker out to exploit the title character (portrayed by Ray Milland).

Rickles and Lorne Greene on The Don Rickles Show in 1968

Rickles appeared in the Beach Party film series. He recalled in his 2007 memoir that at a White House dinner, Barbara Bush teased him about his decision to appear in those films. Rickles's agent Jack Gilardi was married to Annette Funicello when Rickles was cast in the Beach Party films. He subsequently began to appear more frequently on television talk shows, first appearing on The Tonight Show Starring Johnny Carson in 1965. Rickles became a frequent guest and guest host, appearing more than 100 times on The Tonight Show during Carson's era. An early Carson–Rickles Tonight highlight occurred in 1968 when, while two Japanese women treated Carson to a bath and foot massage, Rickles walked onto the set. Rickles also made frequent appearances on The Dean Martin Show and became a fixture on The Dean Martin Celebrity Roast specials.

In 1968, Rickles released a live comedy album titled Hello, Dummy!, which reached number 54 on the Billboard 200 album chart. In the same year he starred in his own variety show on ABC, The Don Rickles Show, with comedy writer Pat McCormick as his sidekick; the show lasted only 17 episodes and was replaced by a prime-time version of the game Let's Make a Deal. During the 1960s, Rickles made guest appearances on The Dick Van Dyke Show, The Munsters, The Addams Family, The Mothers-in-Law, Gilligan's Island, Get Smart, The Twilight Zone episode "Mr. Dingle, the Strong", The Andy Griffith Show, Gomer Pyle, U.S.M.C., and I Dream of Jeannie.

=== Mid-career ===
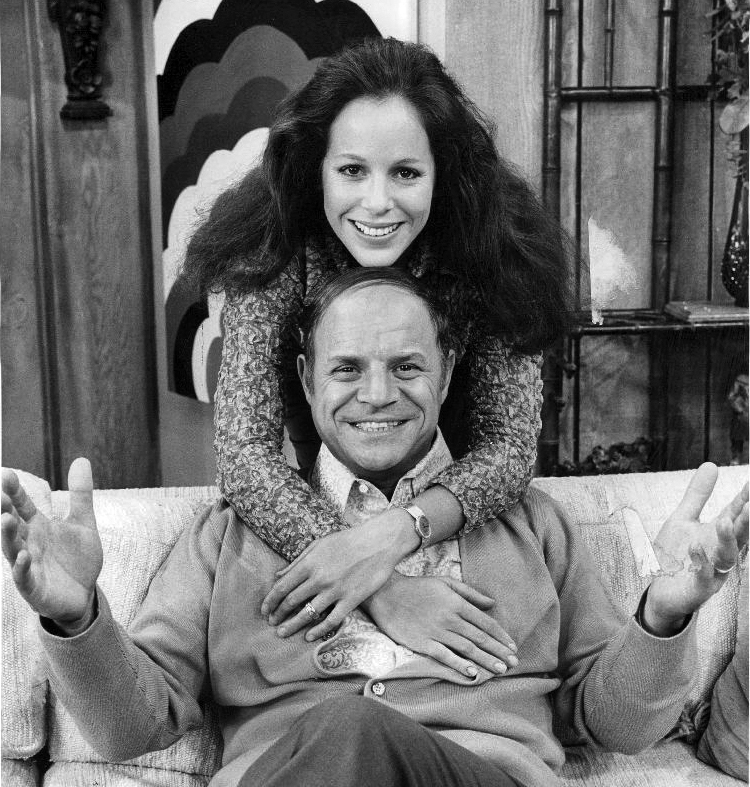
Rickles and Louise Sorel in The Don Rickles Show

In 1970, Rickles had a notable role as Crapgame in Kelly's Heroes, sharing the marquee poster with co-stars Clint Eastwood, Telly Savalas, Donald Sutherland, and Carroll O'Connor. In 1972, he starred in The Don Rickles Show (his second series with that title), which lasted for 13 episodes. He also starred in a series of television specials. In his memoirs, Rickles acknowledged a scripted sitcom was not well-suited to his ad lib style of performing; he had earlier said that he never wrote down his jokes.

Starting in 1973, he became a popular dais comedian appearing on The Dean Martin Celebrity Roast specials. In 1976–1978, he starred in C.P.O. Sharkey, which lasted two seasons. The series is remembered for the cigarette box incident when Johnny Carson made an impromptu visit during a Tonight Show taping to the adjacent TV studio during an episode's taping, feigning "incensed" ire that Rickles, an ex-smoker, broke Johnny Carson's wooden box, from 1967, on the previous night, while a guest on The Tonight Show, on which Bob Newhart was the guest host. The incident was often replayed in Tonight Show retrospectives and was considered a highlight of the 1970s era of the series. Rickles retorted that he would replace the box with an X-ray of Johnny Carson's lungs.

Rickles occasionally appeared as a panelist on Hollywood Squares and was depicted in comic-book form by Jack Kirby during his work on the Superman's Pal Jimmy Olsen series (part of Jack Kirby's Fourth World).

In the early 1980s, Rickles began to perform with Steve Lawrence in concerts in Las Vegas. In 1983, the duo co-hosted Foul-Ups, Bleeps & Blunders, an imitation of TV's Bloopers & Practical Jokes. In 1982, he was in "Death of a Lodger", an episode of Archie Bunker's Place. In 1985, when Frank Sinatra was asked to organize and perform at Ronald Reagan's second presidential inaugural celebration, he insisted Rickles be allowed to perform and do it unrehearsed. Rickles considered this performance the highpoint of his career.

In 1990, Rickles appeared in the second-season episode of Tales from the Crypt titled "The Ventriloquist's Dummy". In 1992, he was cast in Innocent Blood, directed by John Landis. In his memoir, Rickles wrote that he recalled Landis was a "production assistant" to Brian G. Hutton during the filming of Kelly's Heroes. During the filming of Innocent Blood, Rickles would kid Landis by ordering him to get coffee or to run other errands befitting his one-time "gofer" status.

In 1993, Rickles starred in another short-lived sitcom titled Daddy Dearest, with Richard Lewis. In 1995, he portrayed Billy Sherbert in the 1995 Universal Pictures film Casino and voiced Mr. Potato Head in the 1995 Disney and Pixar film Toy Story. He reprised his role as Mr. Potato Head in Toy Story 2 (1999). Rickles starred as George Wilson in 1998's Dennis the Menace Strikes Again; that same year, he portrayed a film theater manager in Dirty Work and voiced Cornwall, one of the heads of a two-headed dragon, in Quest for Camelot. In 1999, he briefly appeared in a fictionalized form in The Simpsons episode "Viva Ned Flanders".

=== Later works ===
Rickles made a cameo appearance as himself in a recurring dream sequence in "Sub Conscious", an episode of The Unit, which aired in February 2007.

On his 80th birthday on May 8, 2006, Simon & Schuster released his memoir titled Rickles' Book. Mr. Warmth: The Don Rickles Project, a documentary about Rickles directed by John Landis, made its debut on HBO on December 2, 2007. Rickles won a Primetime Emmy Award for Outstanding Individual Performance in a Variety or Music Program, besting a number of notable comics, including David Letterman, Jon Stewart, and Stephen Colbert. Rickles remarked, "Stephen Colbert's a funny man, but he's too young. He has got plenty of time to win awards, but this may be my last year and I think that I made it count. On second thought, it was probably just a mercy award for an old man." In 2009, Rickles appeared on Kathy Griffin: My Life on the D-List and met Griffin's mother Maggie to fulfill one item on Maggie's "bucket list". In 2010, he appeared in a commercial during Super Bowl XLIV as a talking rose, and appeared on the 37th Annual Daytime Emmy Awards on CBS TV on June 27, 2010.

He reprised his role as Mr. Potato Head in Toy Story 3 (2010). In 2011, Rickles reunited with his Casino (1995) co-star Joe Pesci in a Snickers advertisement highlighting actors known for their "short fuses". Rickles also portrayed the supposedly late husband of Elka (Betty White) on Hot in Cleveland— a "surprise" because his character was believed dead.

On May 28, 2014, Rickles was honored by Spike TV's One Night Only: An All-Star Comedy Tribute to Don Rickles. Recorded live at New York City's Apollo Theater, Jerry Seinfeld was the master of ceremonies for the two-hour special, with live monologs by Johnny Depp, Martin Scorsese, Robert De Niro, Jon Stewart, David Letterman, Tracy Morgan, Brian Williams, Regis Philbin, Amy Poehler, and Tina Fey. Recorded segments included bits from Bob Newhart, Bill Cosby, Jimmy Kimmel, and Eddie Murphy. Seinfeld described Rickles as a part of the "Mount Rushmore of Stand-up Comedy" with George Carlin, Richard Pryor, and Bill Cosby.

"The camaraderie and the comedy made the show a cross between a traditional roast and a dignified lifetime achievement award, spanning emotions ranging from admiration and gratitude to, well, degradation. And as the evening reached its climax, when Rickles got his say after all that had said about him and his nearly 60-year-long career, fittingly, he had the last laugh." – TV Week

He was still a frequent guest on late night talk shows, including Jimmy Kimmel Live!, The Tonight Show Starring Jimmy Fallon, The Late Late Show with Craig Ferguson among others, during the latter months of his life. On May 11, 2015, Rickles appeared as a guest on one of the final episodes of The Late Show with David Letterman. He also made a cameo appearance in Grandfathered.

In an interview in 2014, he dismissed thoughts of retiring, stating:

"I'm in good health. I'm working better than I ever have. The audiences are great. Why should I retire? I'm like a fighter. The bell rings and you come out and fight. My energy comes alive. And I still enjoy it."

Up until his death on April 6, 2017, despite being impeded by multiple surgeries following a bout with necrotizing fasciitis in 2013, he continued touring across the United States.

He was reportedly slated to reprise his role as Mr. Potato Head in Toy Story 4 (2019), but died before recording any lines of dialogue. With permission from his wife, Barbara Rickles, Josh Cooley reused unused archival audio from the first three Toy Story films to honor him and dedicate to his memory.

== Personal life ==
On March 14, 1965, Rickles married Barbara Sklar of Philadelphia. He admitted to having a difficult time romantically in his 20s and 30s, meeting Sklar through his agent when he was 38 years old and falling for her when she failed to get his sense of humor. They had two children: Mindy, an actress, and Larry, a producer who died of pneumonia at the age of 41. According to Rickles's memoir, his grandchildren Ethan and Harrison Mann were much more impressed by his role as Mr. Potato Head than by any of his other achievements. Barbara died from non-Hodgkin lymphoma on March 14, 2021, exactly 56 years after the couple married.

Rickles befriended mobster "Crazy" Joe Gallo following a performance at the Copacabana in 1972. Gallo, whom Rickles had ribbed mercilessly during his set, despite being warned not to do so, accepted Rickles's ribbings in good humor and invited him to Umbertos Clam House after the show. Rickles declined the offer. That night, a gunfight erupted at Umberto's, killing Gallo. This situation was dramatized in the movie The Irishman.

Rickles performed at the inaugurations of Ronald Reagan and George H. W. Bush with his friend Frank Sinatra, although Rickles himself was a lifelong Democrat. He considered Bob Newhart his best friend, and the two often vacationed together along with their wives, who were also close. Rickles and Newhart appeared together on The Tonight Show with Jay Leno on January 24, 2005, the Monday following Johnny Carson's death, reminiscing about their many guest appearances on Carson's show. The two also appeared together on the television sitcom Newhart and for previous episodes of The Tonight Show, where Newhart or Rickles were guest hosts. The friendship was memorialized in Bob & Don: A Love Story, a 2023 short documentary film by Judd Apatow featuring interviews with and home movies of both families.

=== Death ===
On April 6, 2017, Rickles died of kidney failure at the age of 90 at his home in Century City, Los Angeles. He was buried at Mount Sinai Memorial Park Cemetery.

== Legacy ==
Many television hosts paid tribute to his comedic talents, with Conan O'Brien, Jimmy Kimmel, Jimmy Fallon, Stephen Colbert, Seth Meyers, and David Letterman among them. Barbra Streisand, Billy Crystal, Mel Brooks, Toy Story (1995) filmmaker John Lasseter, Ron Howard, Chris Rock, Patton Oswalt, Jim Carrey, Ricky Gervais and even his Toy Story (1995) co-stars Tom Hanks (the voice of Woody), Tim Allen (the voice of Buzz Lightyear) and Whoopi Goldberg (the voice of Stretch in Toy Story 3) paid their respects on Twitter.

Bob Newhart said: "He was called 'The Merchant of Venom', but in truth, he was one of the kindest, caring, and most sensitive human beings we have ever known. We are devastated, and our world will never be the same. We were totally unprepared for this."

Martin Scorsese, who directed him in Casino in 1995, stated: "Don Rickles was a giant, a legend ... and I can hear his voice now, skewering me for being so lofty. I had the honor of working with him on my picture Casino. He was a professional. He kept me doubled over with laughter every day on the set – yet he was a complete pro. We became friends over the years, and I had the honor of being roasted by him more than once – sometimes when I didn't expect it. He just started showing up at places and insulting me. Experiencing Don, and tuning into his mind, I witnessed the evolution of his comedy. It was like listening to a great jazz musician wail. Nobody else did what he did. He made comedy into an art form. And like all geniuses, comic or otherwise, he's irreplaceable. He was much loved. I'm really missing this man." Jim Norton portrayed Rickles in Scorsese's 2019 film The Irishman.

At the 90th Academy Awards, The Academy honored Rickles in its annual in Memoriam segment. The 2019 film Toy Story 4 was dedicated to his memory, as well as that of the animator, Adam Burke. Rickles died before recording any lines of dialogue, but with permission from his wife, Barbara Rickles, he would still reprise his role as Mr. Potato Head posthumously via reused unused archival audio.

== Discography ==
- Hello Dummy! (1968)
- Don Rickles Speaks! (1969)

== Bibliography ==
- Rickles, Don; Ritz, David (2007). Rickles' Book: A Memoir. Simon & Schuster. ISBN 978-0-7432-9305-1.
- Rickles, Don; Ritz, David (2008). Rickles' Letters. Simon & Schuster. ISBN 978-1-4165-9663-9.

== Awards and nominations ==
Year	Award	Category	Work	Result	Ref.
1969	Grammy Awards	Best Comedy Album	Hello Dummy!	Nominated	
1970	Grammy Awards	Best Comedy Album	Don Rickles Speaks!	Nominated	
2000	Hollywood Walk of Fame	—N/a	Lifetime Achievement	Won	
2008	Primetime Emmy Awards	Individual Performance in a Variety Program	Mr. Warmth: The Don Rickles Project	Won	
2009	TV Land Award	Legend Award	Lifetime Achievement	Won	
2012	The Comedy Awards	The Johnny Carson Award	Lifetime Achievement	Won	
2013	New York Friars Club	Lifetime Achievement Award	—N/a	Won	
