= Mr. Warmth: The Don Rickles Project =

- Directed by: John Landis
- Produced by: Robert Engelman; John Landis; Mike Richardson; Larry Rickles
- Cinematography: Tom Clancey
- Edited by: Mark L. Levine
- Distributed by: Dark Horse Entertainment; Home Box Office
- Release date: October 13, 2007 (New York Film Festival)
- Running time: 89 minutes
- Country: United States
- Language: English
- Budget: $500,000 (estimated)

Mr. Warmth: The Don Rickles Project is a 2007 documentary film about stand-up comedian Don Rickles, which was first screened at the 2007 New York Film Festival and then shown on HBO.

The documentary and its producers – Robert Engelman, John Landis, Mike Richardson, and Larry Rickles – earned a Primetime Emmy for Outstanding Variety, Music, or Comedy Special in 2008. Don Rickles also won a Primetime Emmy Award for Individual Performance in a Variety or Music Program for his appearance in the documentary. The documentary was Sidney Poitier's final film released during his lifetime.

== Structure ==
The film consists of performance clips from throughout Rickles' career interspersed with recent interviews with him. A show at the Stardust Casino in Las Vegas from 2006 is featured most prominently. The film also features some of Rickles' notable television and movie appearances, including his many appearances on The Tonight Show Starring Johnny Carson. There are also interviews from several stand up performers and celebrities who have encountered Rickles over the years.

== Interviewees ==
- Dave Attell
- Roseanne Barr
- Ernest Borgnine
- James Caan
- Mario Cantone
- Jack Carter
- Roger Corman
- Billy Crystal
- Robert De Niro
- Clint Eastwood
- Whoopi Goldberg
- Kathy Griffin
- Christopher Guest
- Penn Jillette
- Jimmy Kimmel
- Larry King
- John Landis
- Peter Lassally
- John Lasseter
- Steve Lawrence
- Jay Leno
- Richard Lewis
- George Lopez
- Peggy March
- Ed McMahon
- Bob Newhart
- Regis Philbin
- Sidney Poitier
- Carl Reiner
- Debbie Reynolds
- Joan Rivers
- Chris Rock
- Bob Saget
- Martin Scorsese
- Harry Shearer
- Sarah Silverman
- Bobby Slayton
- Keely Smith
- Dick Smothers
- Tom Smothers
- John Stamos
- Harry Dean Stanton
- George Wallace
- Robin Williams

== Reception ==
The film was generally well liked by critics. Much of the praise was directed at Rickles himself for being such an engaging personality. One critic compared Rickles and his sense of humor favorably to the racist comments of Michael Richards and the antisemitic statements of Mel Gibson writing:

"While Rickles seems to mock ethnicity, body type, weight, age and all the other stuff that we're not supposed to make fun of, he's actually defusing all of those things. And once they're deflated by humor, they lose, at least for a moment, their potency. What becomes clear in Landis' film is that Rickles is really a softie, a guy who loves humanity and life. The guy they still call Mr. Warmth really is, and that's apparently the worst-kept secret in show business. When Richards lost it at the comedy club, he was spewing pure hate. Rickles wouldn't know hate if it bit him in the butt."

Critics also noted how Landis seemed at least as interested in showcasing Rickles's humor as he did in Rickles' life.
