= Primetime Emmy Award for Outstanding Individual Performance in a Variety or Music Program =

Award for variety or musical performers

Primetime Emmy Award for Outstanding Performance in a Variety Series
- Awarded for: Outstanding Performance in a Variety Series
- Country: United States
- Presented by: Academy of Television Arts & Sciences
- First award: 1959
- Website: emmys.com

The Primetime Emmy Award for Outstanding Individual Performance in a Variety or Music Program was an annual award given to performers in a variety/music series or specials. The award has been retired; it was last presented in 2008.

== Winners and nominations ==
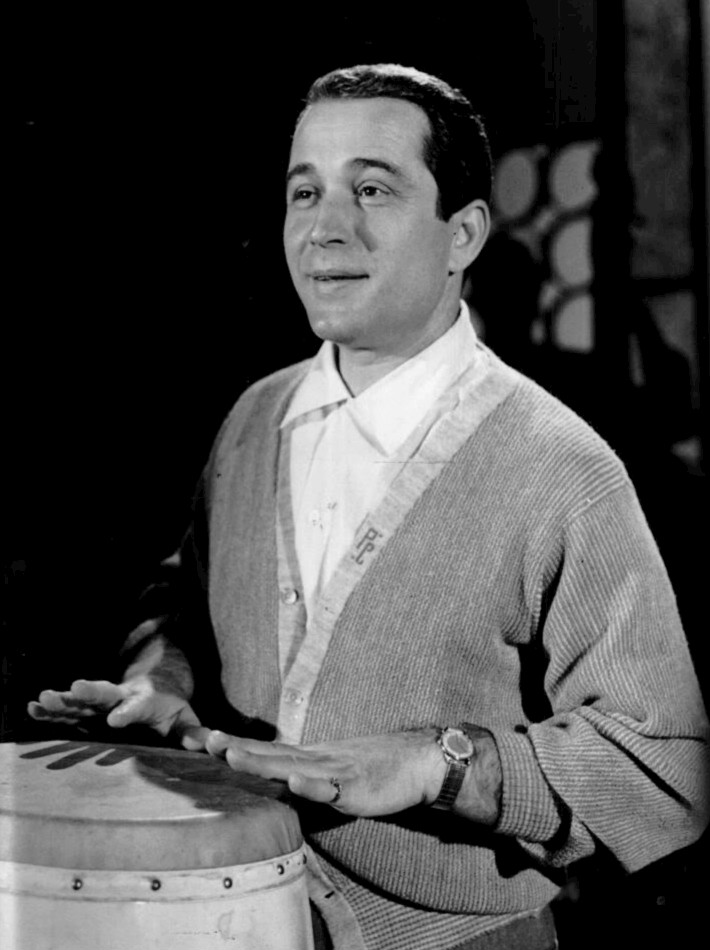
Perry Como was the inaugural winner of this award in 1959.

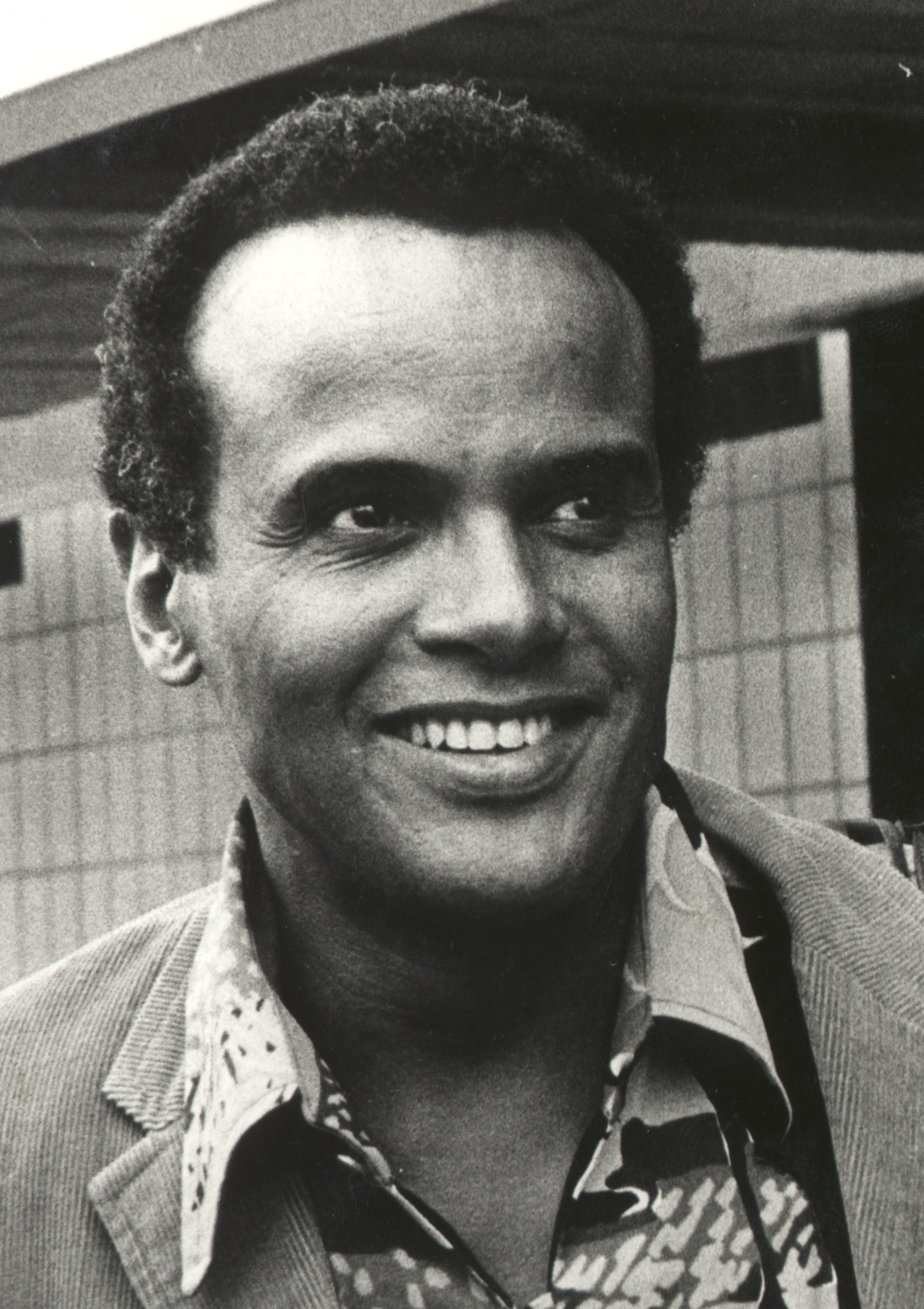
Harry Belafonte won in 1960.

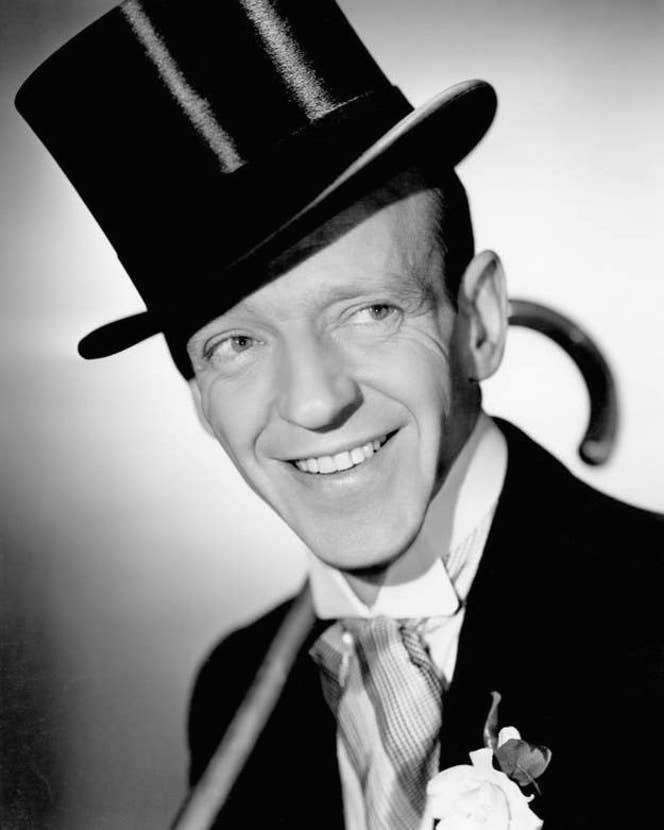
Fred Astaire won in 1961.

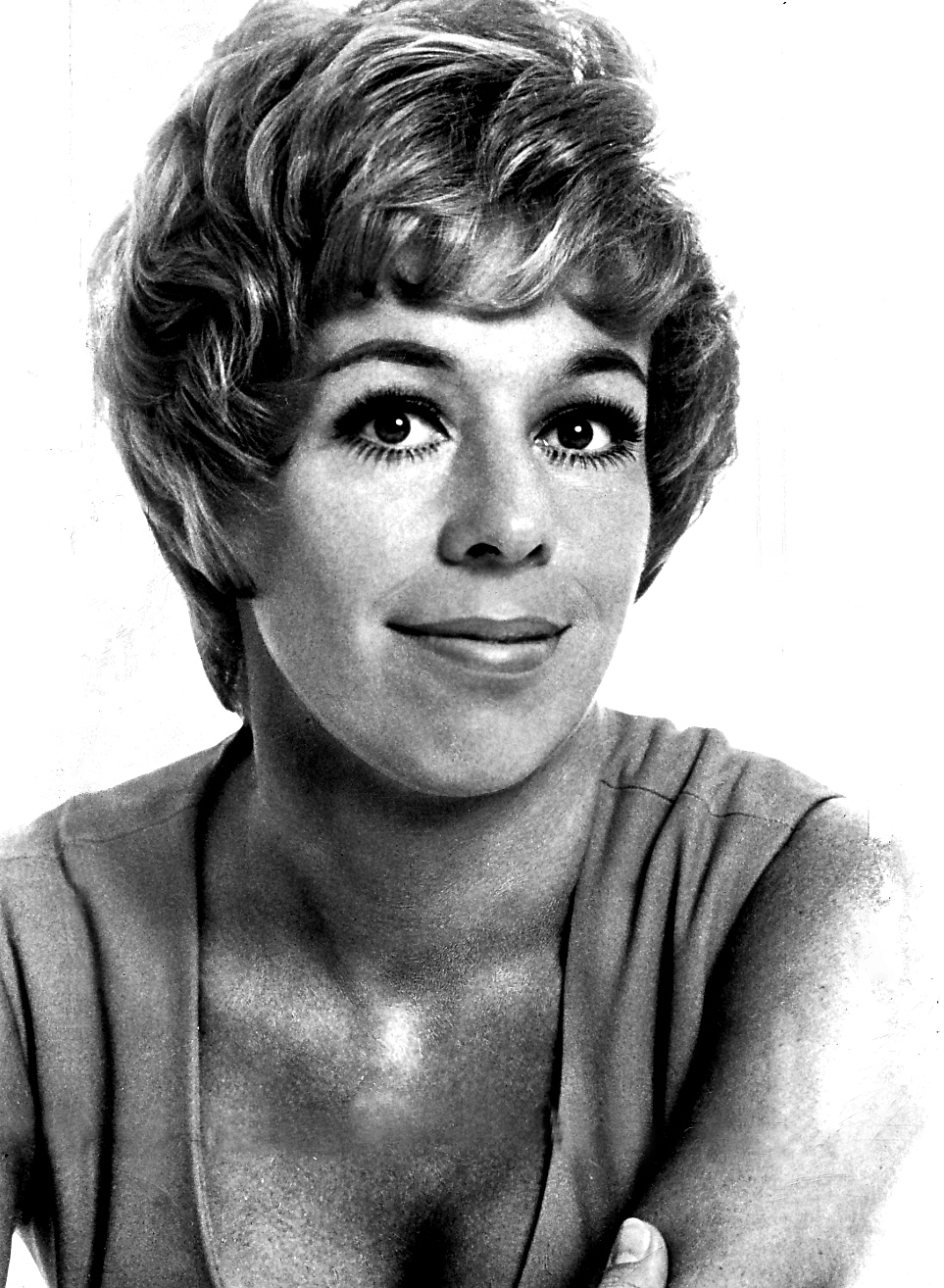
Carol Burnett won twice consecutively in 1962 and 1963.

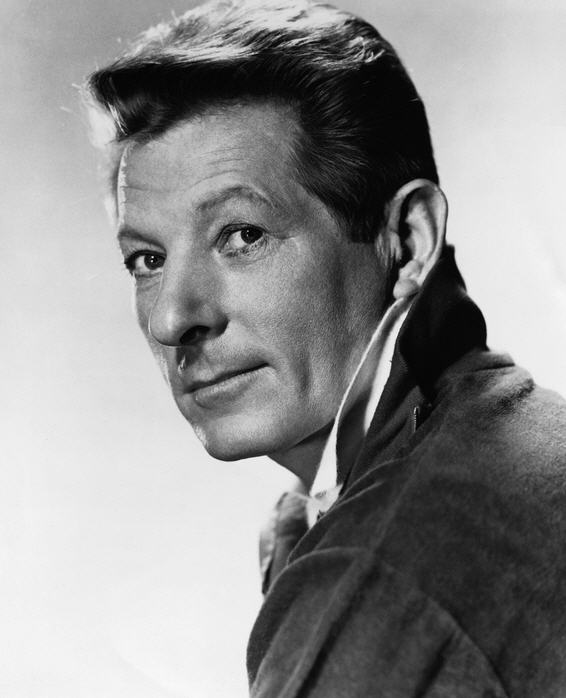
Danny Kaye won in 1964.

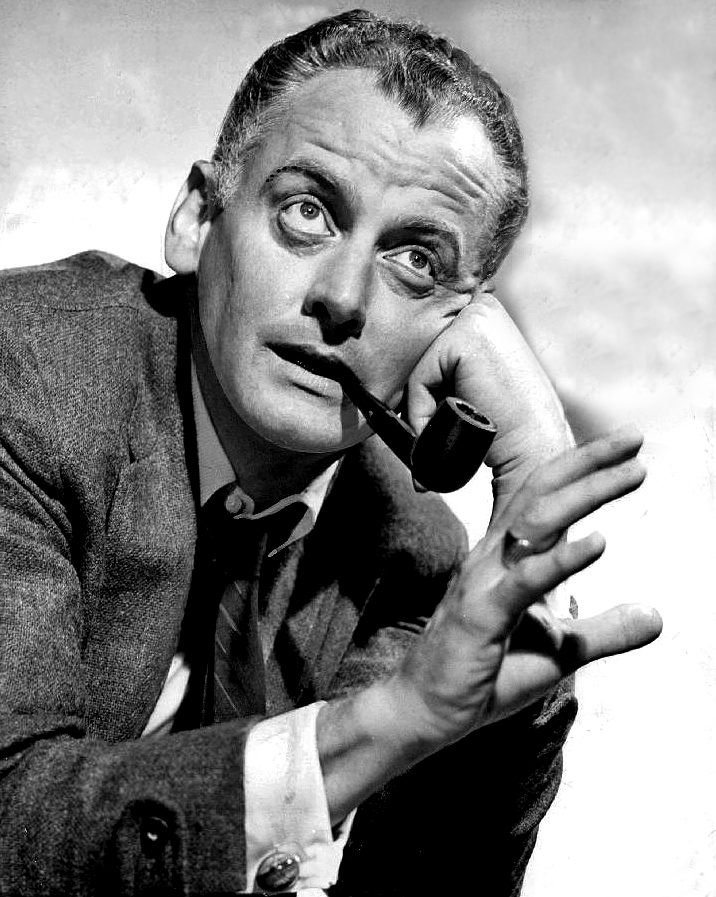
Art Carney won twice consecutively in 1965 and 1966.

Harvey Korman won four times in 1969, 1971, 1972 and 1974.

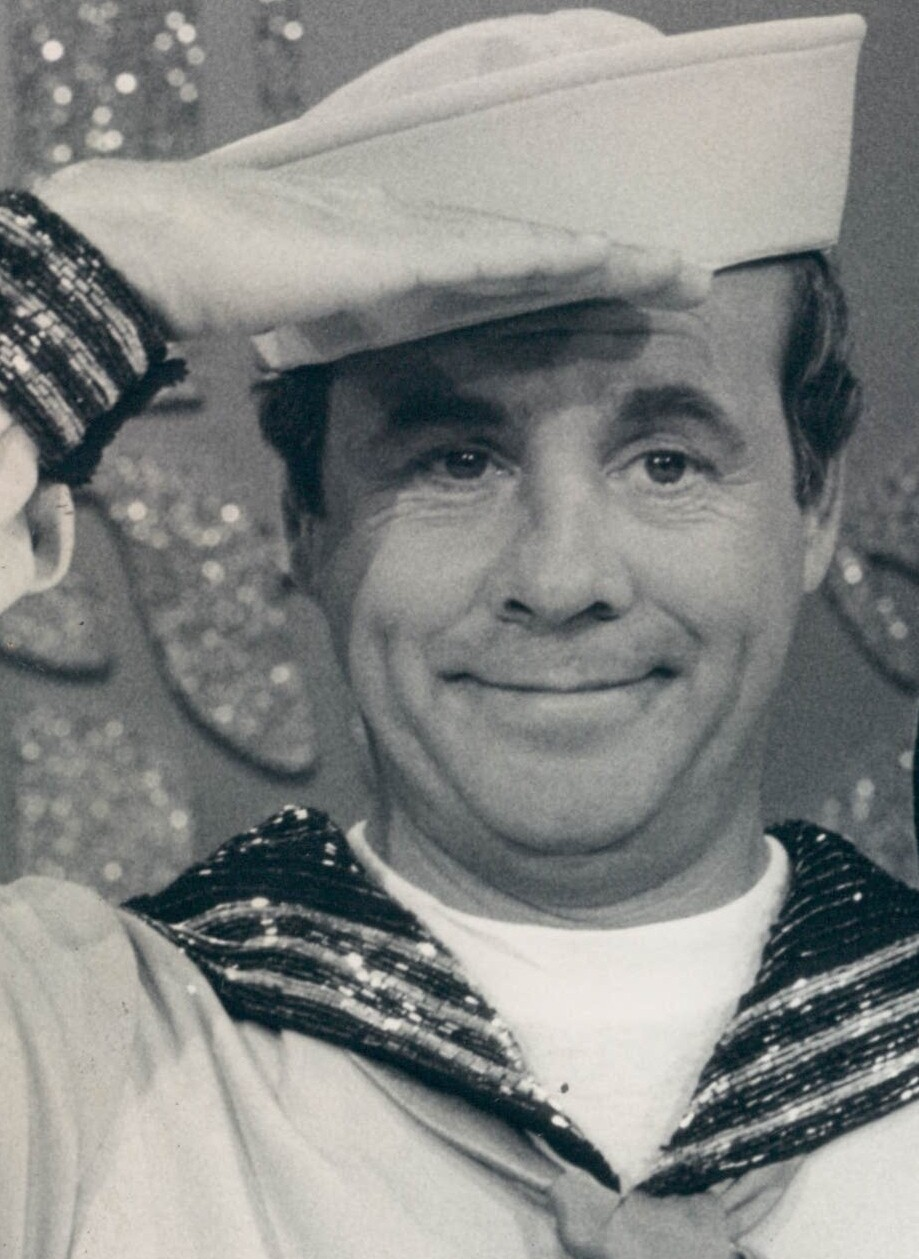
Tim Conway won thrice in 1973, 1977, and 1978.

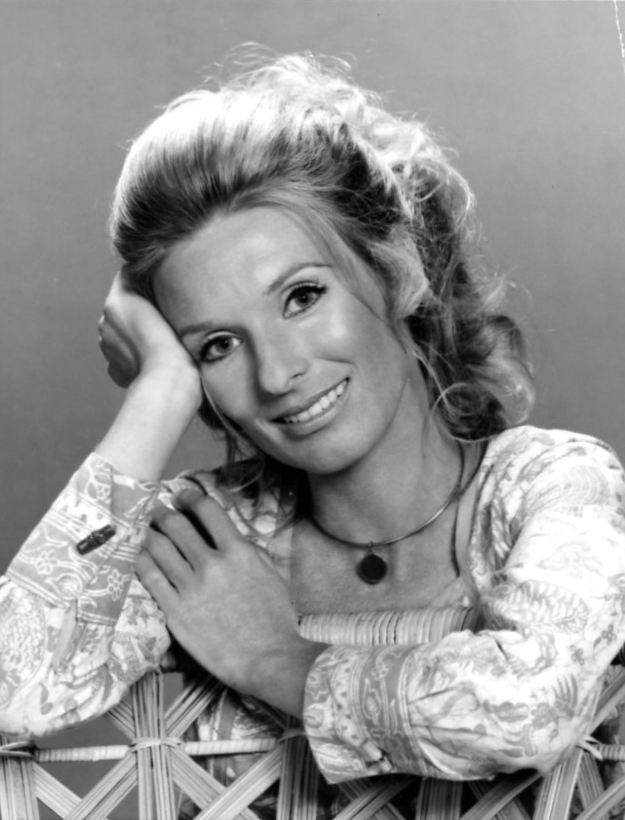
Cloris Leachman won twice in 1975 and 1984.

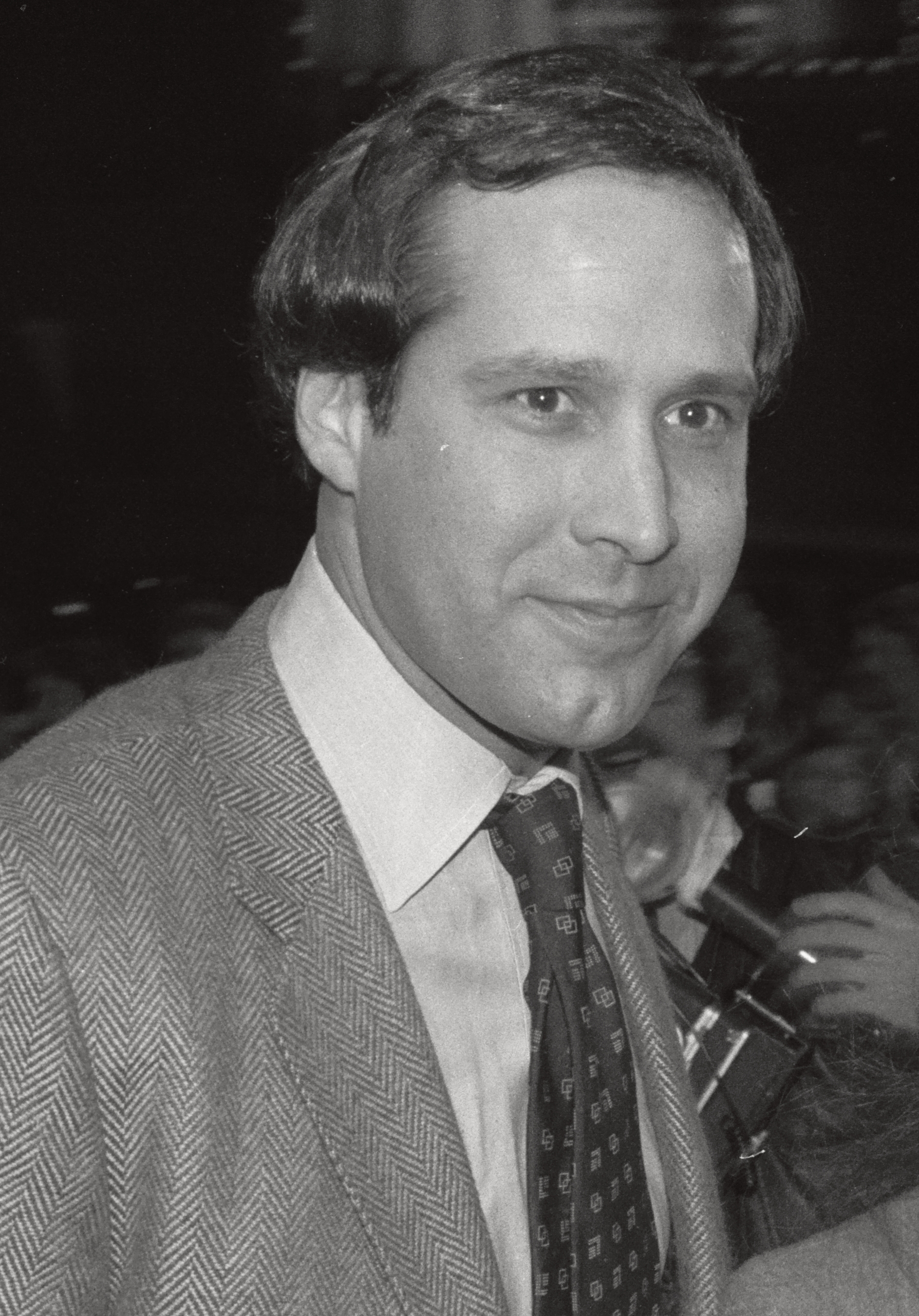
Chevy Chase won in 1976.

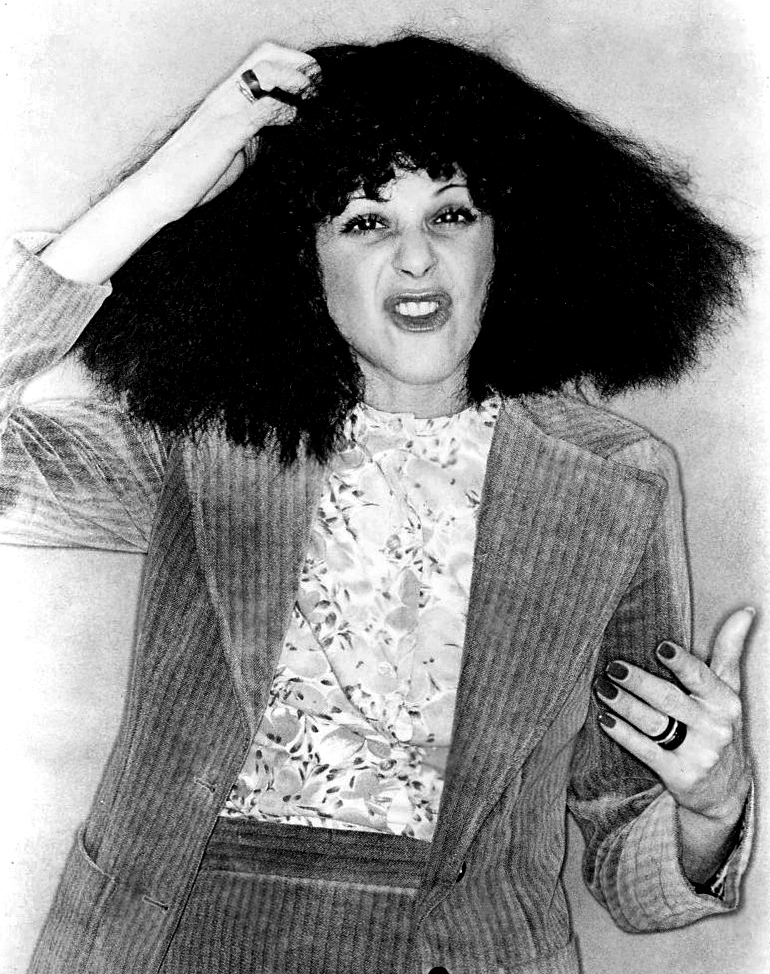
Gilda Radner won in 1978.

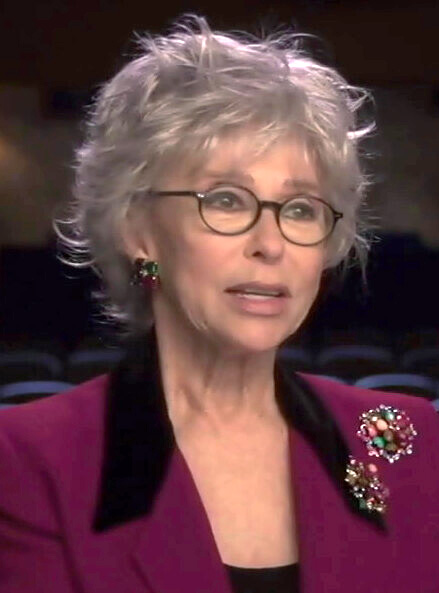
Rita Moreno won in 1977.

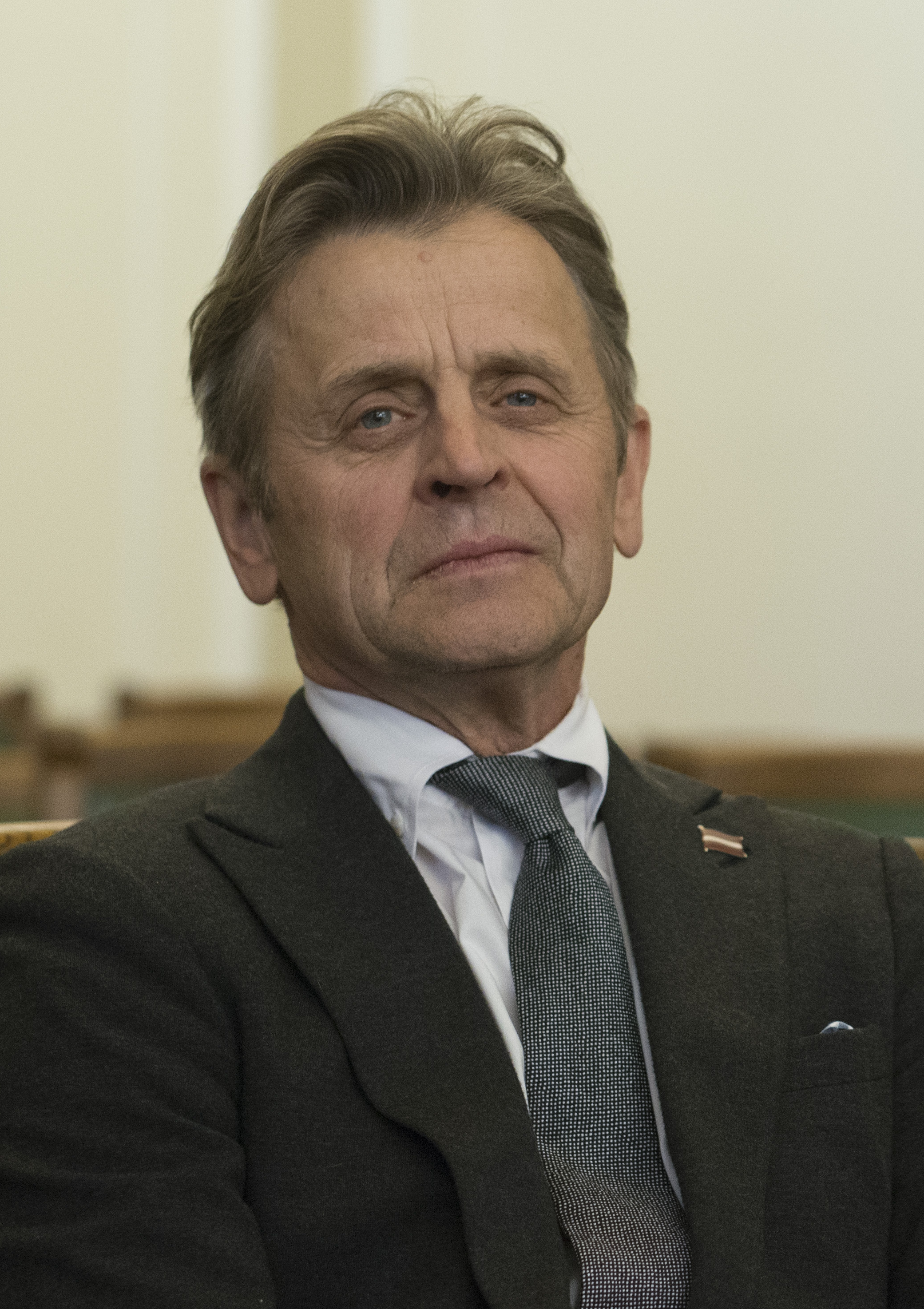
Mikhail Baryshnikov won twice in 1979 and 1989.

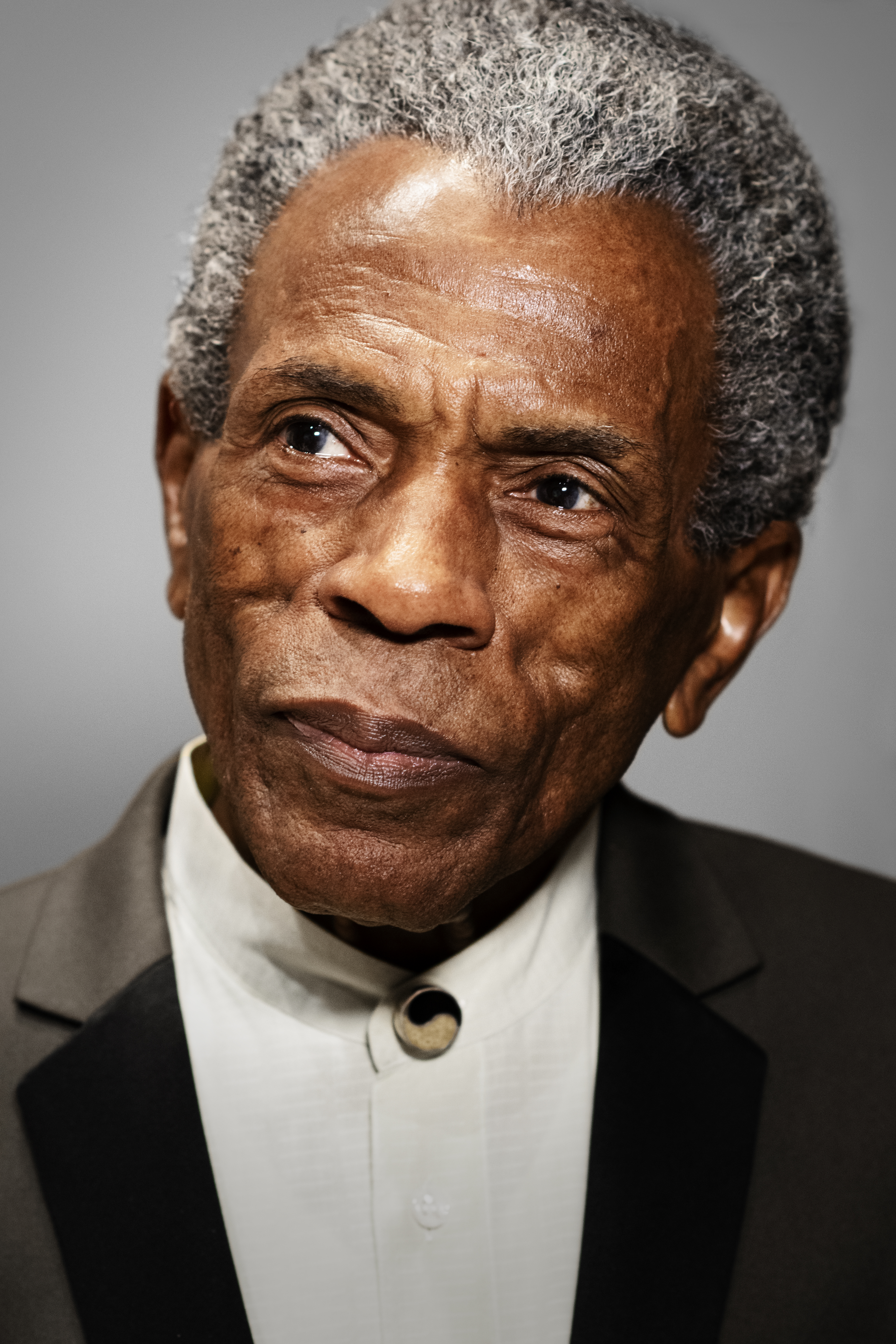
Andre de Shields won in 1982.

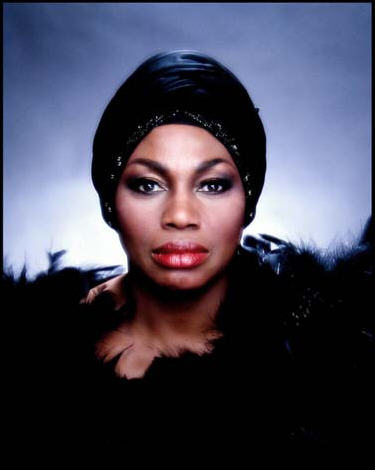
Leontyne Price won in 1984.

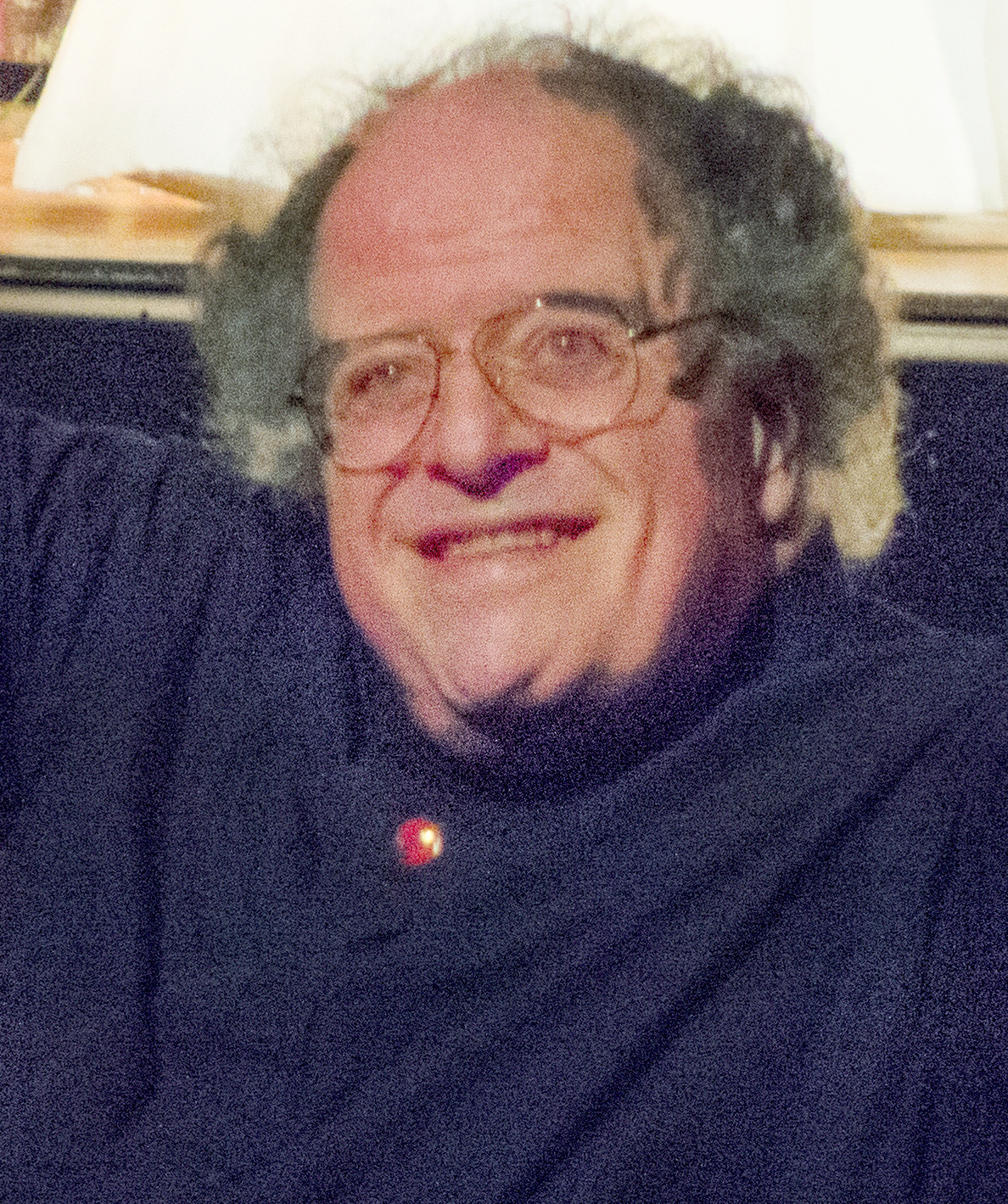
James Levine won in 1984.

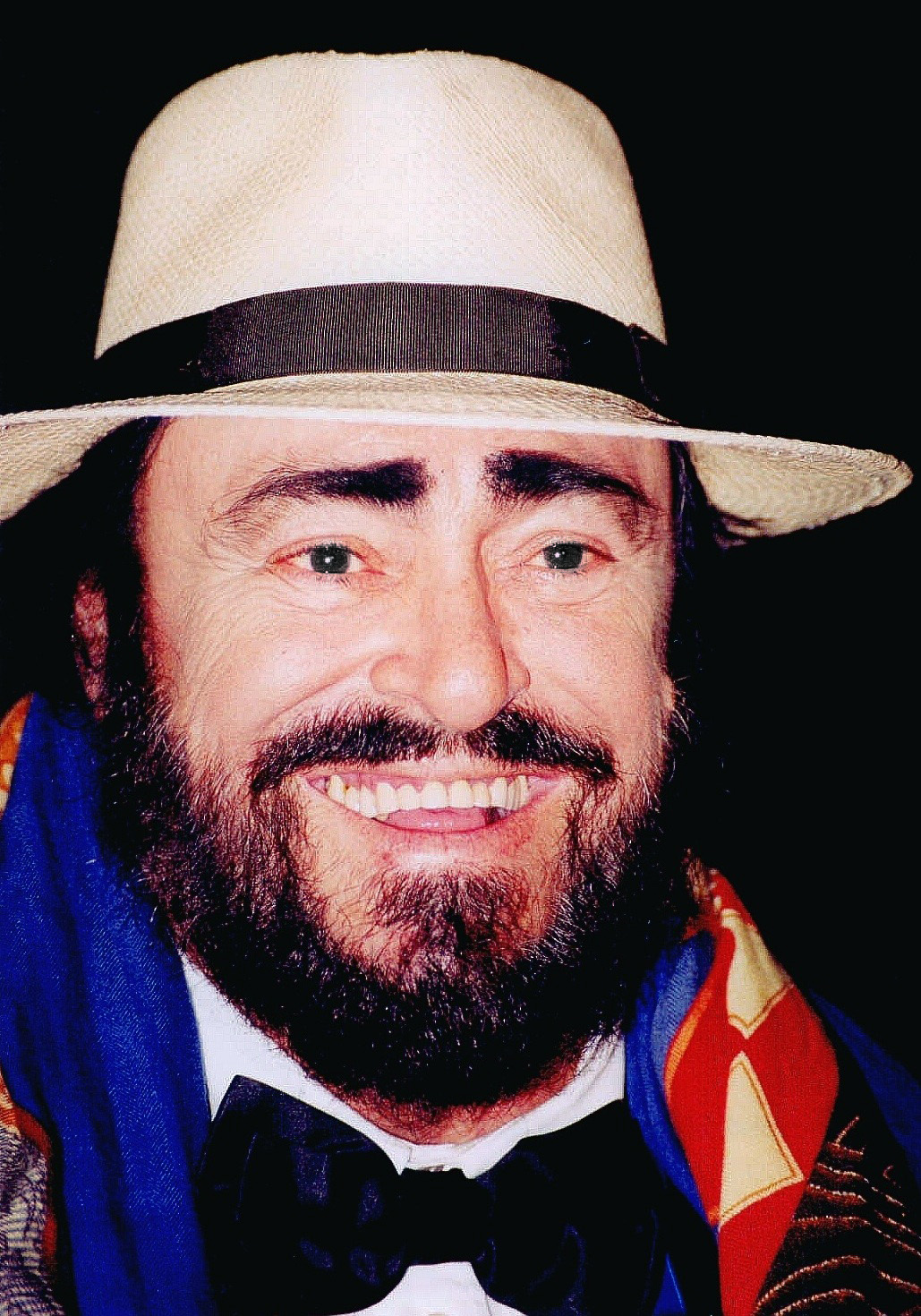
Luciano Pavarotti won in 1985.

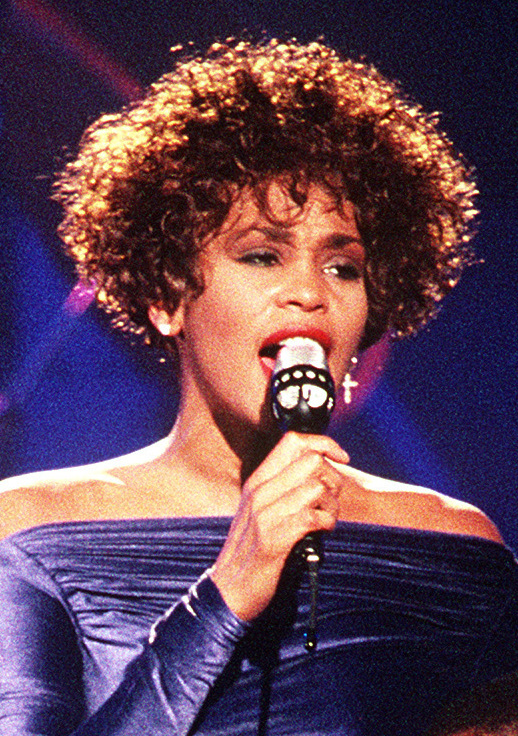
Whitney Houston won in 1986.

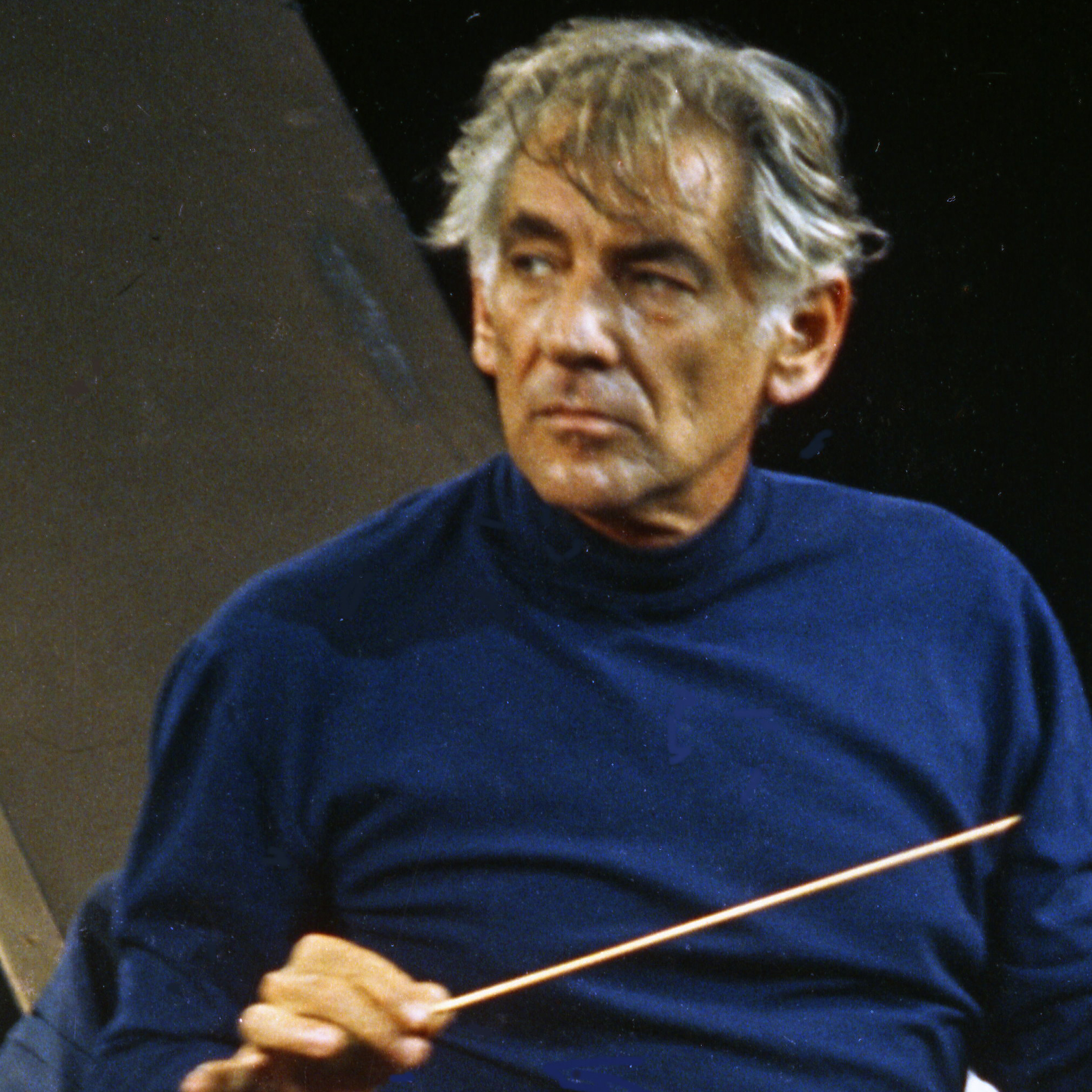
Leonard Bernstein won in 1987.

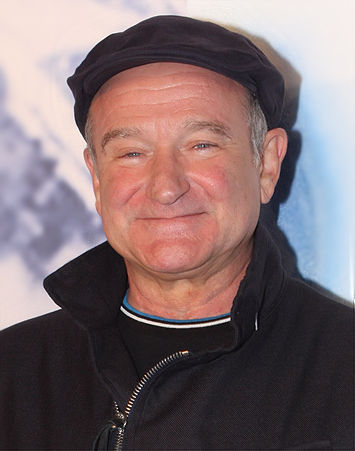
Robin Williams won twice consecutively in 1987 and 1988.

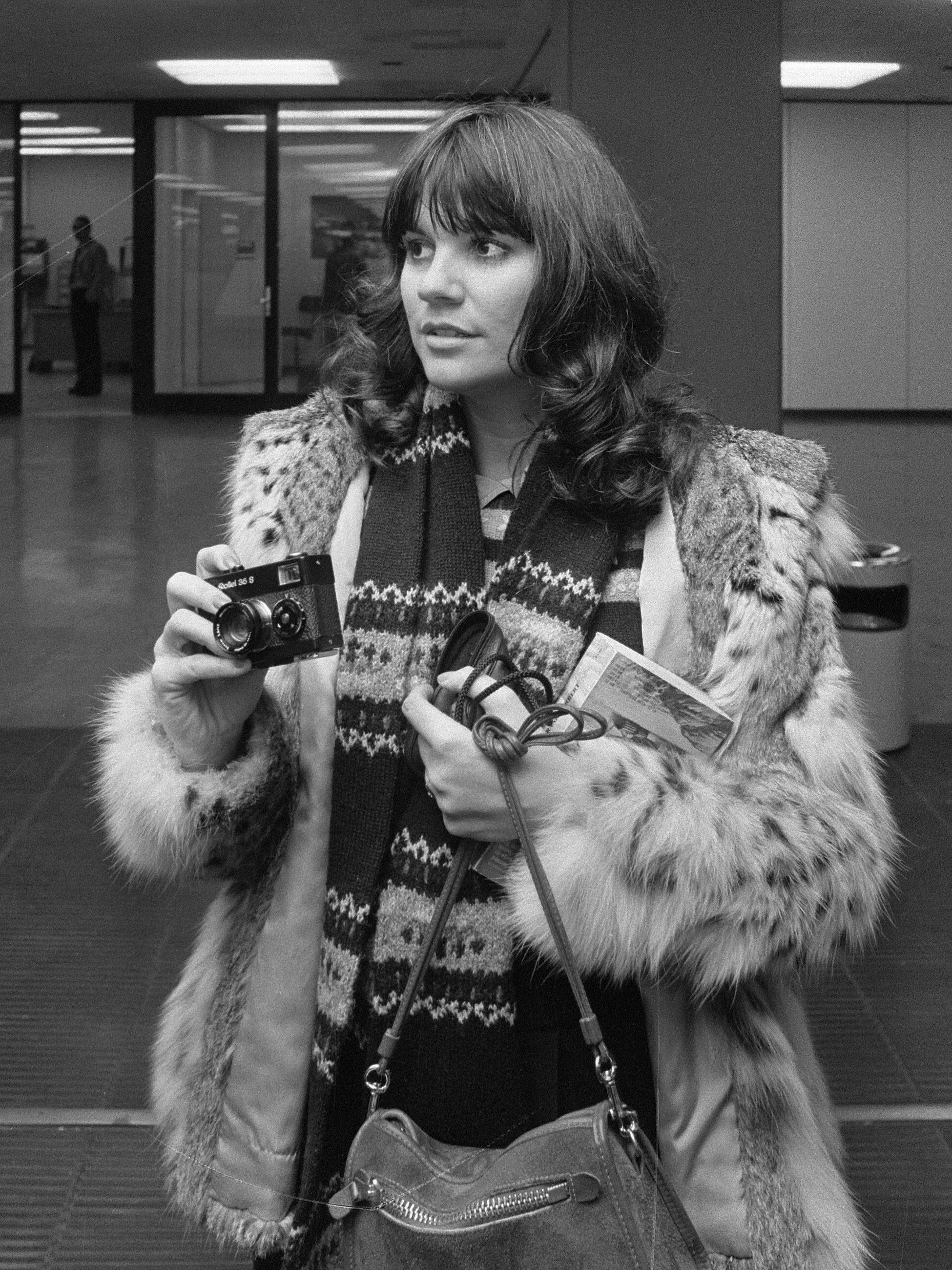
Linda Ronstadt won in 1989.

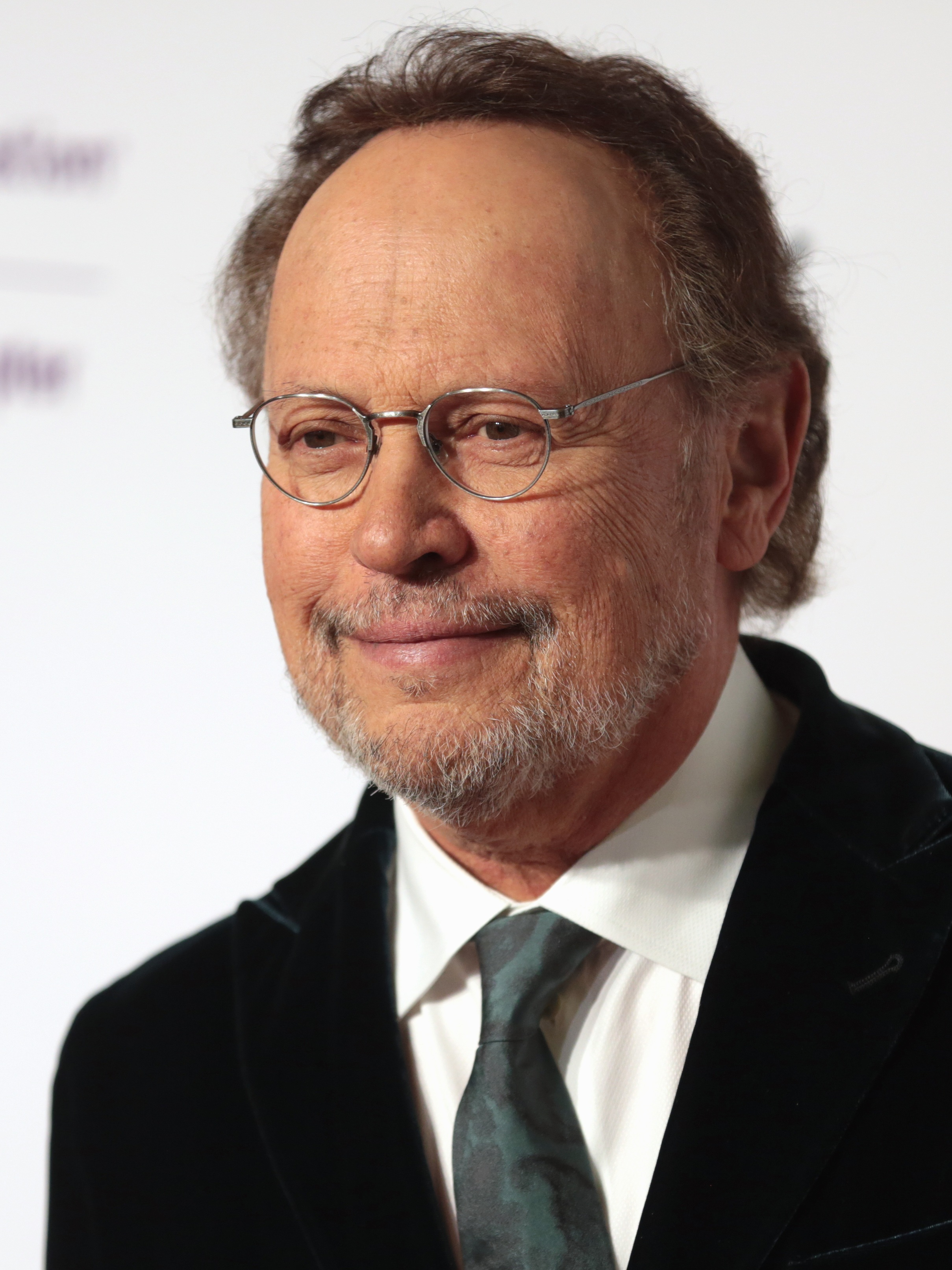
Billy Crystal won thrice in 1989, 1991, and 1998 for hosting both the Grammys and the Oscars (out of 14 nominations).

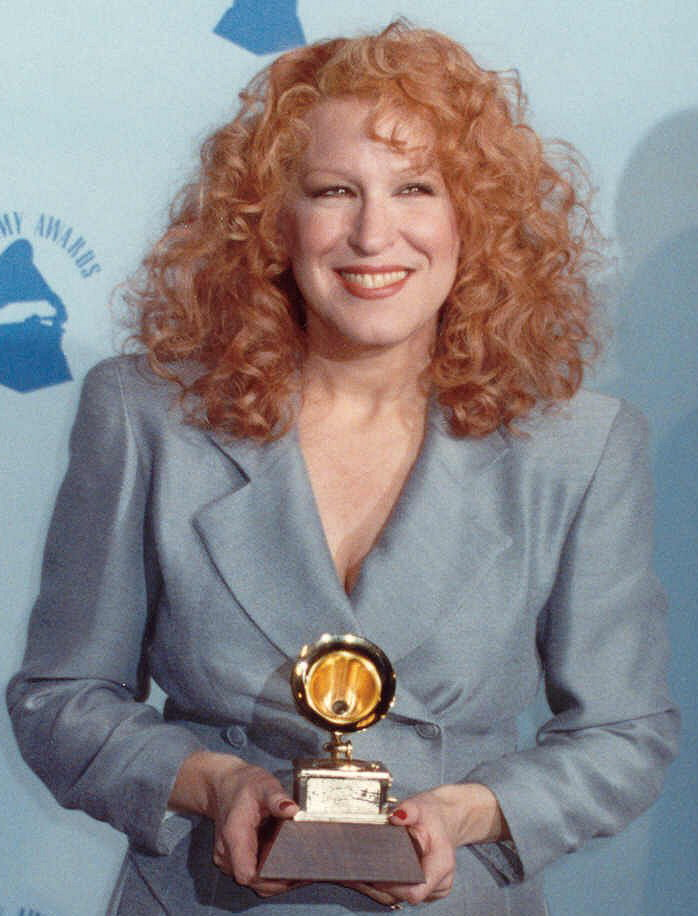
Bette Midler won in twice 1992 and 1997.

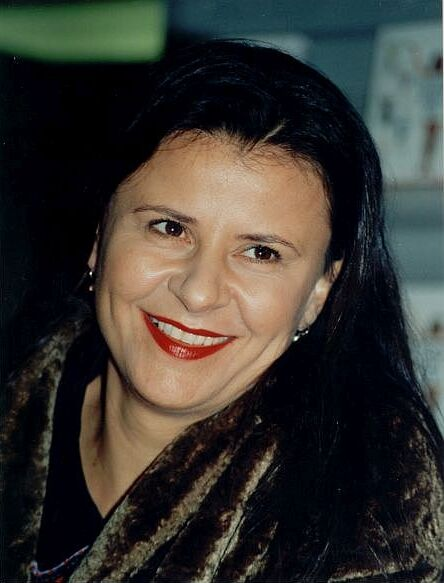
Tracey Ullman won twice in 1990 and 1994.

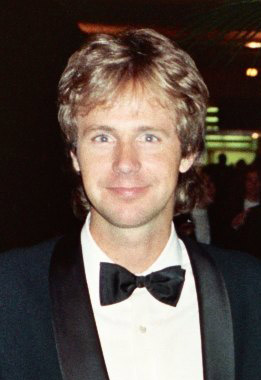
Dana Carvey won in 1993.

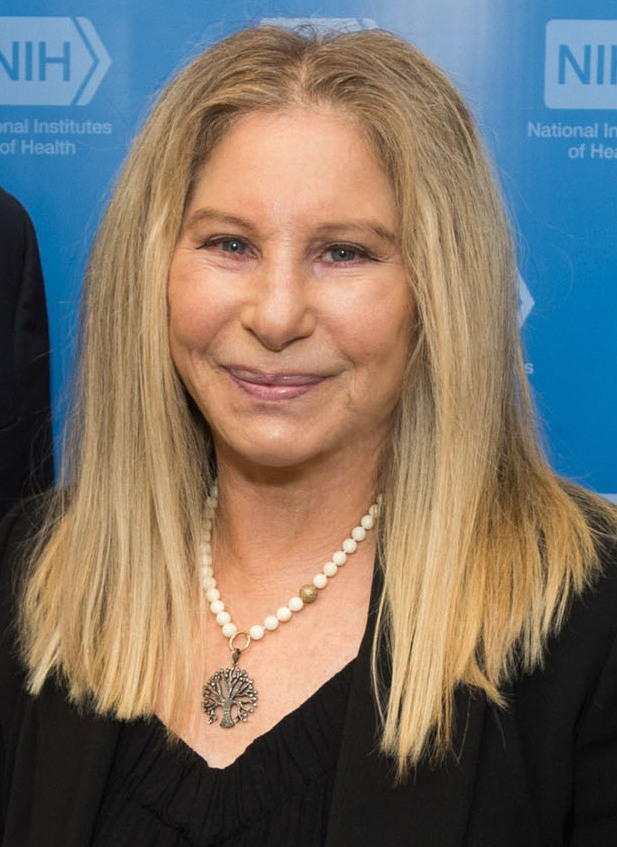
Barbra Streisand won twice in 1995 and 2001.

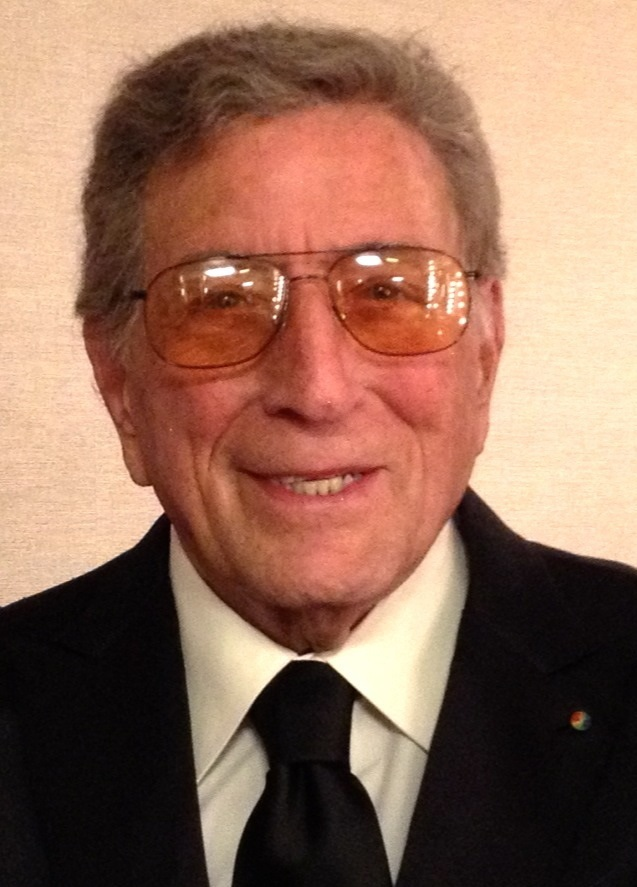
Tony Bennett won in twice in 1996 and 2007.

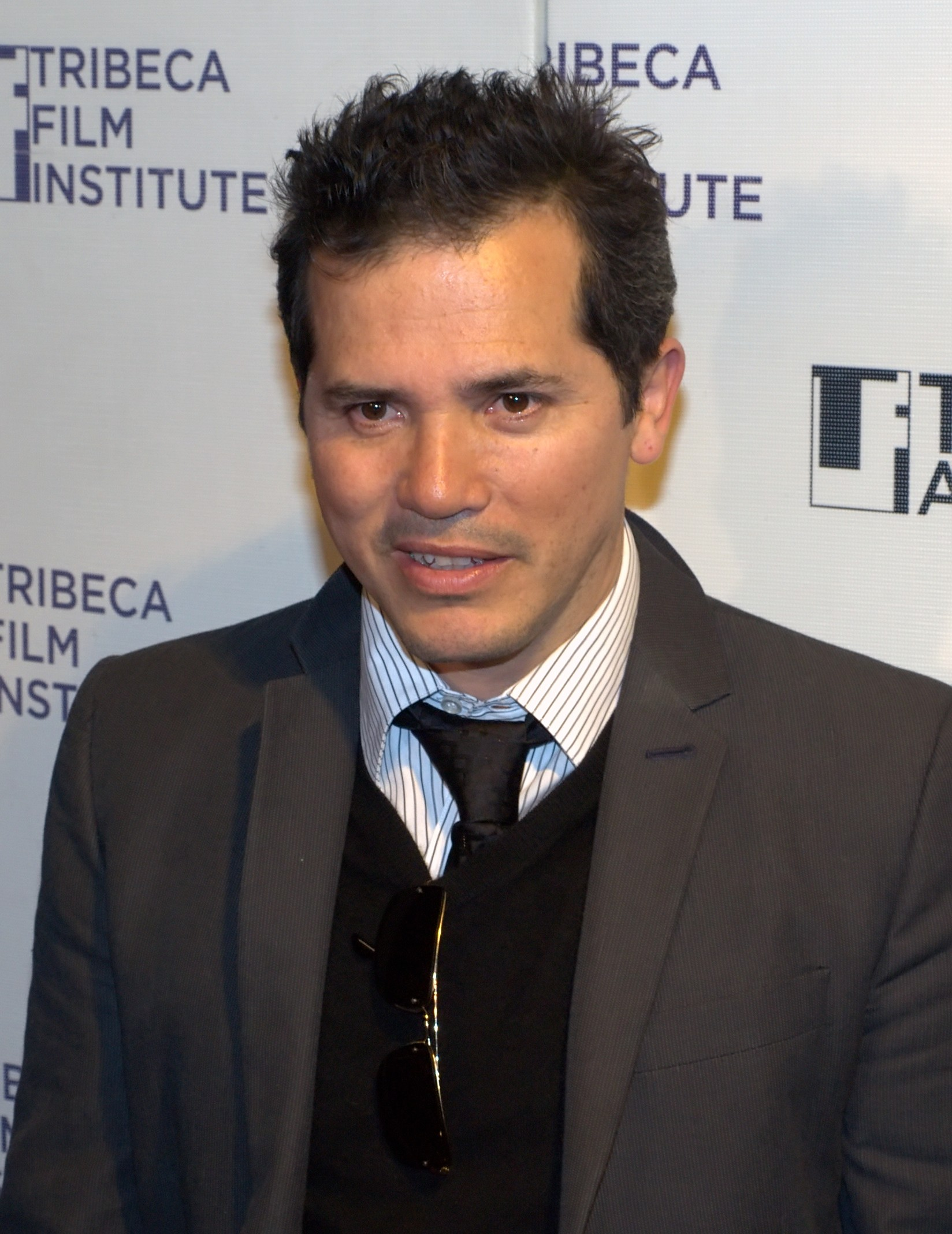
John Leguizamo won in 1999.

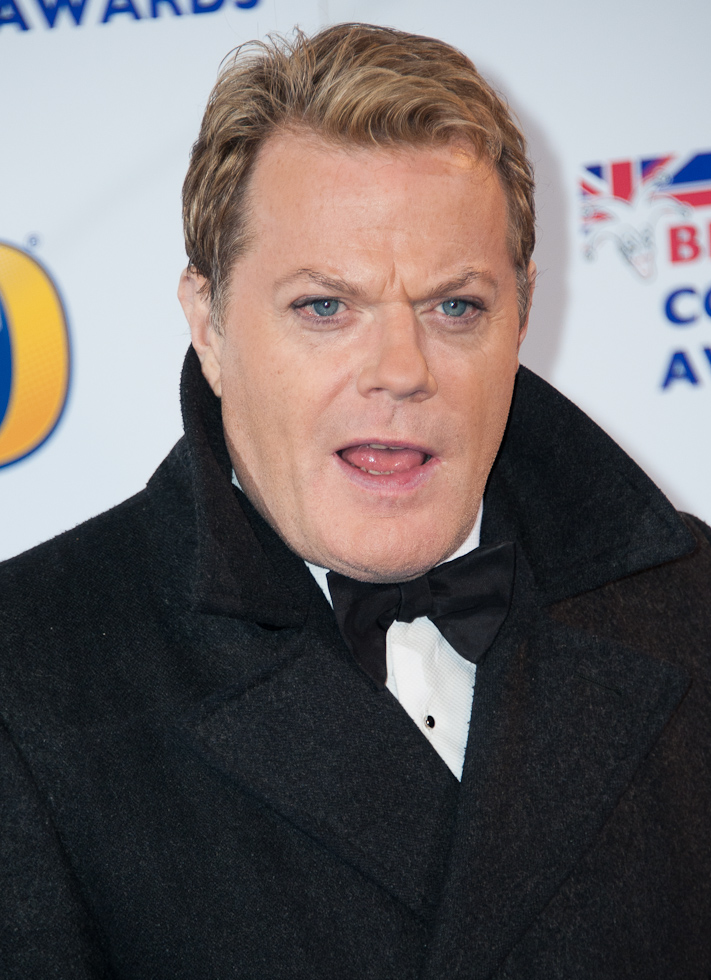
Eddie Izzard won 2000.

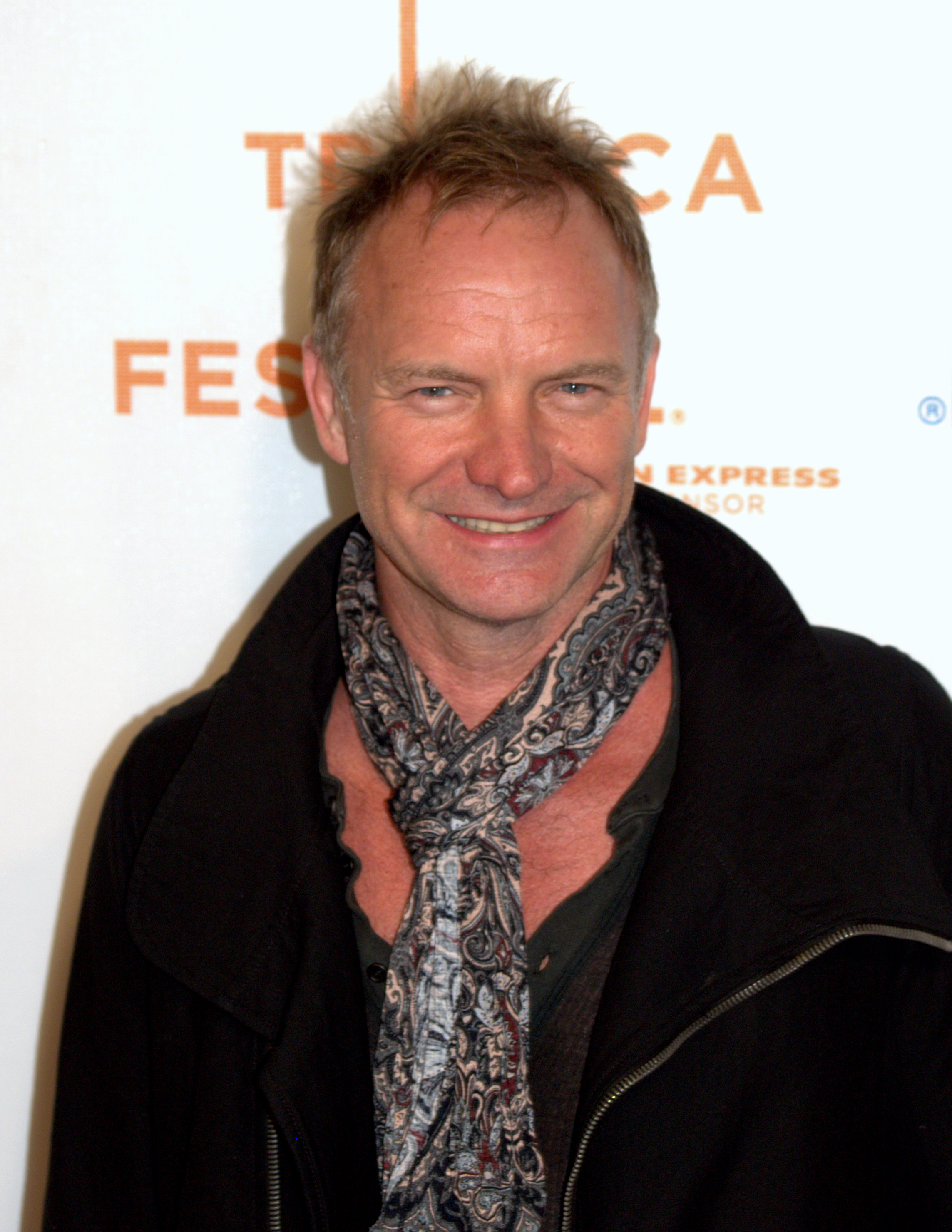
Sting won in 2002.

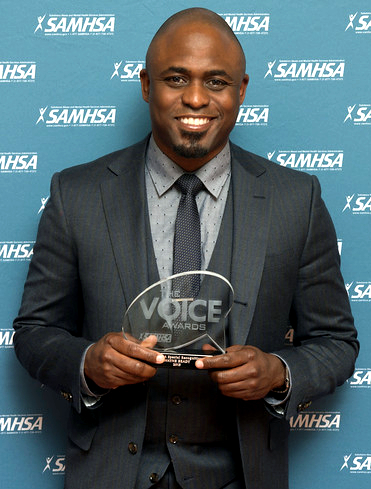
Wayne Brady in 2003.

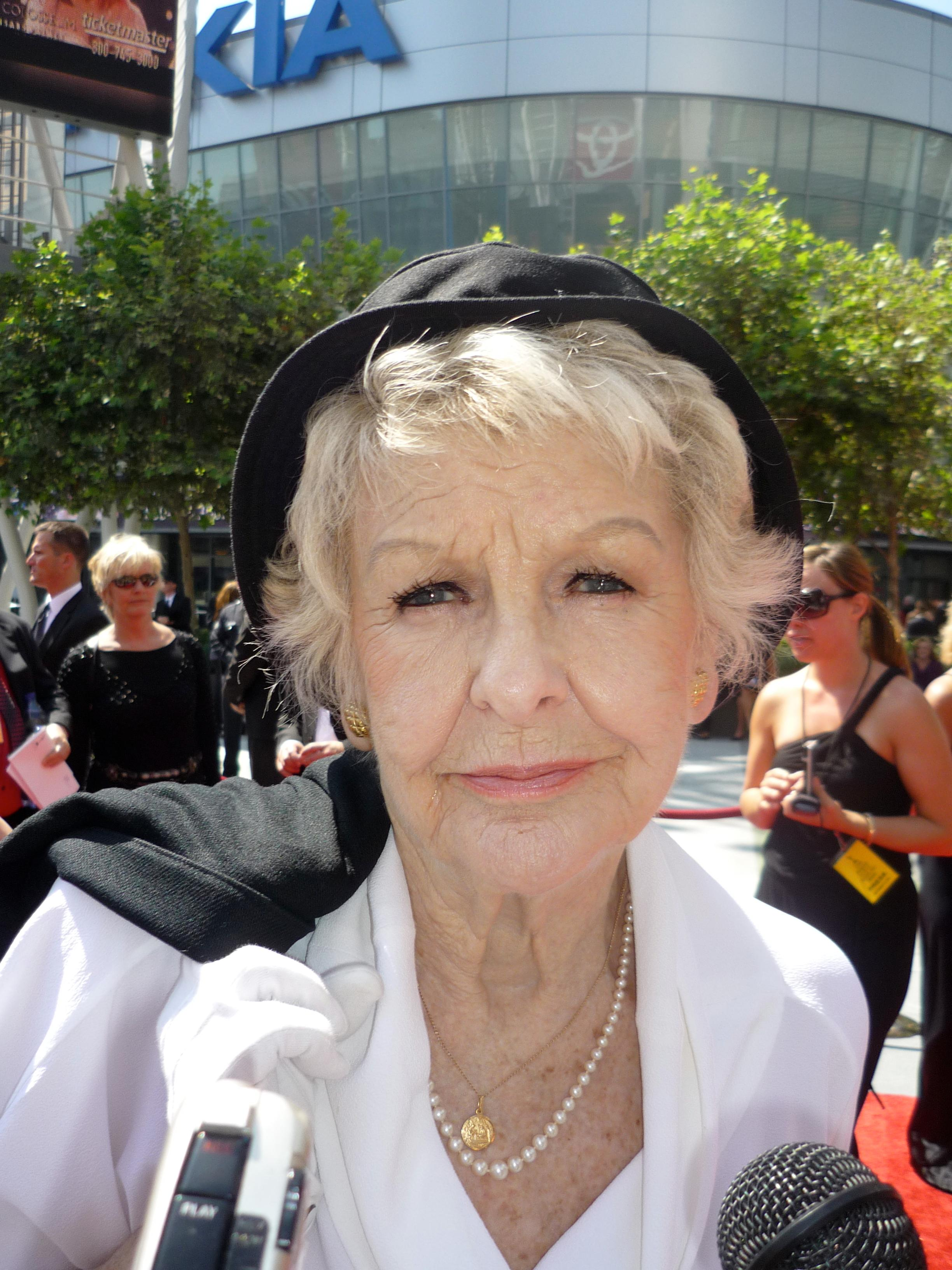
Elaine Stritch won in 2004.

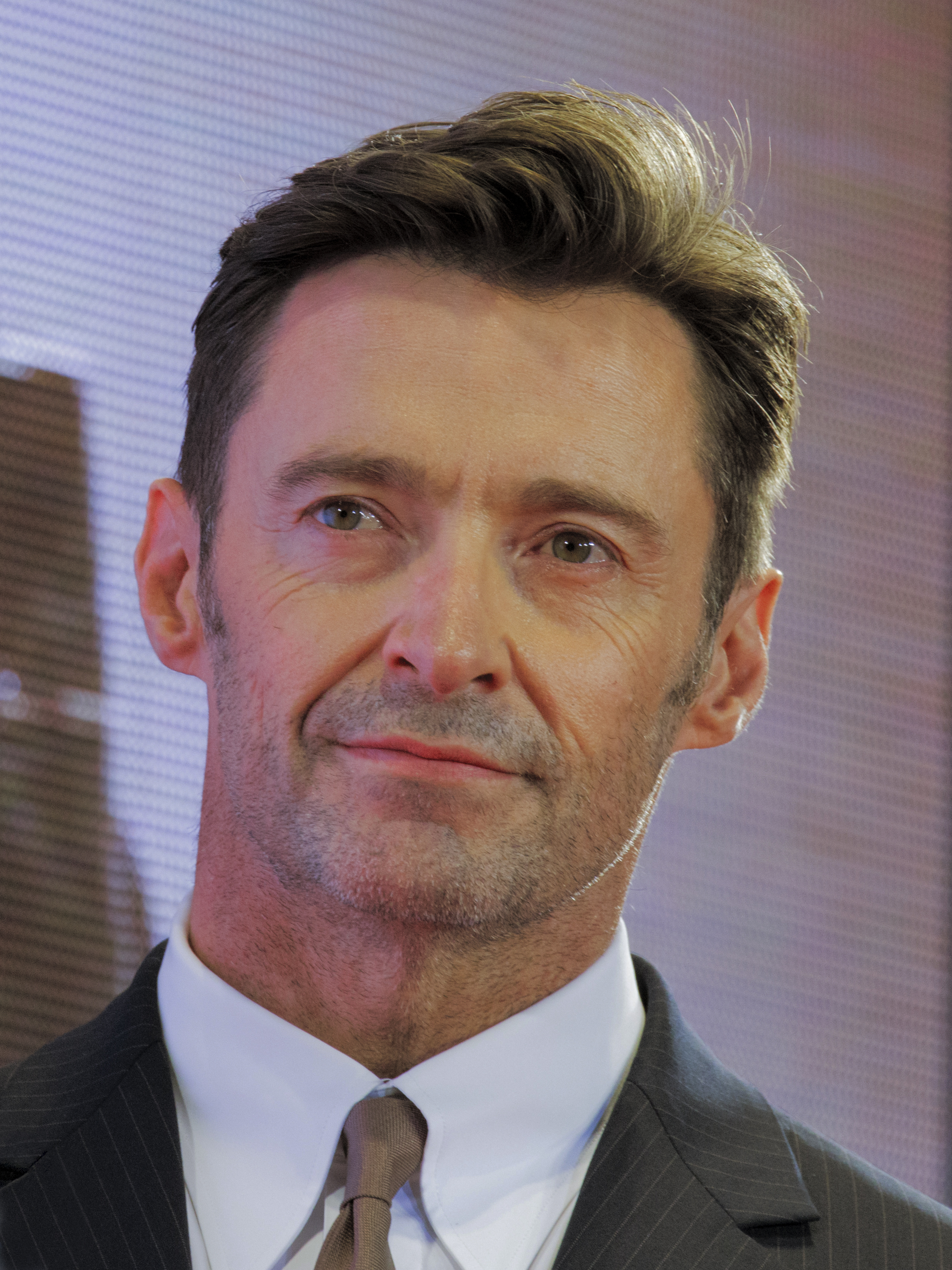
Hugh Jackman won in 2005.

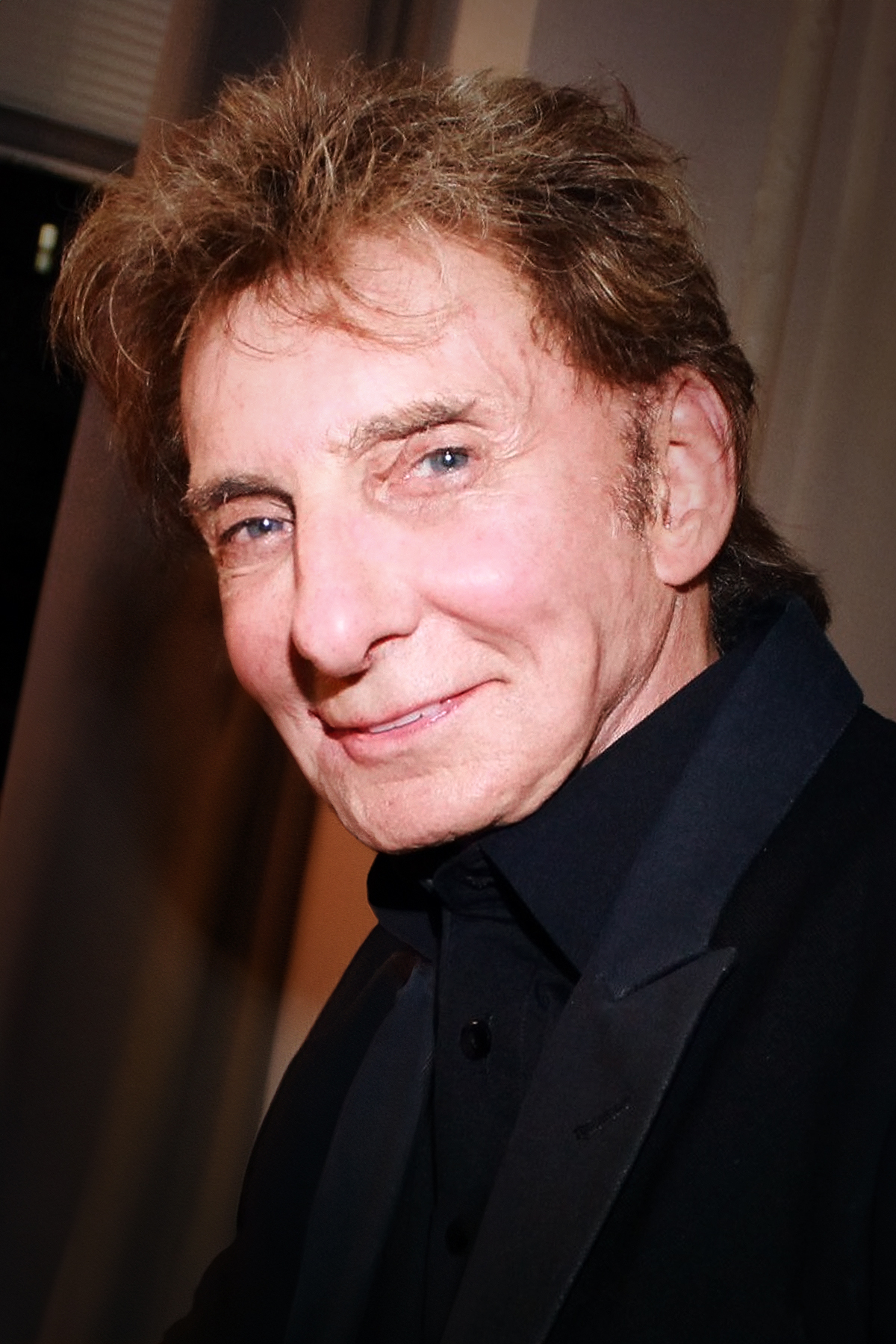
Barry Manilow in 2006.

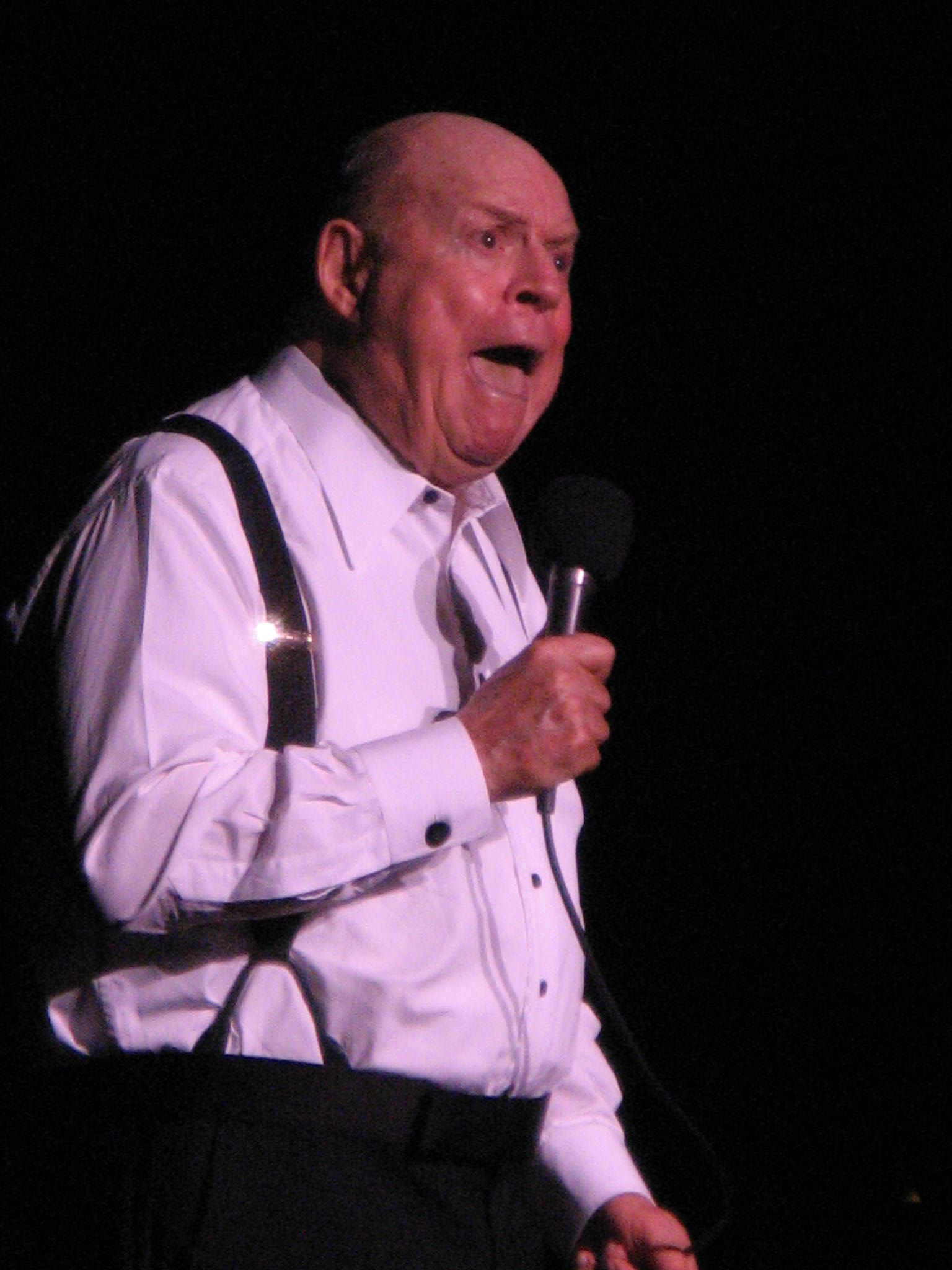
Don Rickles won in 2008.

=== 1950s ===
Year	Performer	Program	Network
1959 (11th)
1959 (11th)	Actor		
1959 (11th)	Perry Como	The Perry Como Show	NBC
1959 (11th)	Steve Allen	The Steve Allen Show	NBC
1959 (11th)	Jack Paar	Tonight Starring Jack Paar	NBC
1959 (11th)	Actress		
1959 (11th)	Dinah Shore	The Dinah Shore Chevy Show	NBC
1959 (11th)	Patti Page	The Patti Page Show	ABC

=== 1960s ===
Year	Performer	Program	Network
1960 (12th)
1960 (12th)	Harry Belafonte	The Revlon Revue: Tonight with Belafonte	CBS
1960 (12th)	Fred Astaire	Another Evening with Fred Astaire	NBC
1960 (12th)	Dinah Shore	The Dinah Shore Chevy Show	NBC
1961 (13th)
1961 (13th)	Fred Astaire	Astaire Time	NBC
1961 (13th)	Harry Belafonte	Belafonte N.Y.	CBS
1961 (13th)	Dinah Shore	The Dinah Shore Chevy Show	NBC
1962 (14th)
1962 (14th)	Carol Burnett	The Garry Moore Show	CBS
1962 (14th)	Edie Adams	Here's Edie	ABC
1962 (14th)	Perry Como	The Kraft Music Hall	NBC
1962 (14th)	Judy Garland	The Judy Garland Show	CBS
1962 (14th)	Yves Montand	Yves Montand on Broadway	ABC
1963 (15th)
1963 (15th)	Carol Burnett	Julie and Carol at Carnegie Hall; An Evening with Carol Burnett	CBS
1963 (15th)	Edie Adams	Here's Edie	ABC
1963 (15th)	Merv Griffin	The Merv Griffin Show	NBC
1963 (15th)	Danny Kaye	The Danny Kaye Show	NBC
1963 (15th)	Andy Williams	The Andy Williams Show	NBC
1964 (16th)
1964 (16th)	Danny Kaye	The Danny Kaye Show	CBS
1964 (16th)	Judy Garland	The Judy Garland Show	CBS
1964 (16th)	Barbra Streisand	The Judy Garland Show	CBS
1964 (16th)	Burr Tillstrom	That Was the Week That Was	NBC
1964 (16th)	Andy Williams	The Andy Williams Show	NBC
1967 (19th) (Note: Awarded under the "Special Classification – Individuals" category)
1967 (19th)	Art Carney	The Jackie Gleason Show	CBS
1967 (19th)	—		
1968 (20th) (Note: Awarded under the "Special Classification – Individuals" category)
1968 (20th)	Art Carney	The Jackie Gleason Show	CBS
1968 (20th)	Pat Paulsen	The Smothers Brothers Comedy Hour	CBS
1968 (20th)	—		
1969 (21st) (Note: Awarded under the "Special Classification – Individuals" category)
1969 (21st)	Arte Johnson	Rowan & Martin's Laugh-In	NBC
1969 (21st)	Harvey Korman	The Carol Burnett Show	CBS
1969 (21st)	Ruth Buzzi	Rowan & Martin's Laugh-In	NBC
1969 (21st)	Goldie Hawn	Rowan & Martin's Laugh-In	NBC

=== 1970s ===
Year	Performer	Program	Network
1971 (23rd) (Note: Awarded under the "Special Classification – Individuals" category)
1971 (23rd)	Harvey Korman	The Carol Burnett Show	CBS
1971 (23rd)	Arte Johnson	Rowan & Martin's Laugh-In	NBC
1971 (23rd)	Lily Tomlin	Rowan & Martin's Laugh-In	NBC
1972 (24th)
1972 (24th)	Harvey Korman	The Carol Burnett Show	CBS
1972 (24th)	Ruth Buzzi	Rowan & Martin's Laugh-In	NBC
1972 (24th)	Lily Tomlin	Rowan & Martin's Laugh-In	NBC
1973 (25th)
1973 (25th)	Tim Conway	The Carol Burnett Show	CBS
1973 (25th)	Harvey Korman	The Carol Burnett Show	CBS
1973 (25th)	Liza Minnelli	A Royal Gala Variety Performance	ABC
1973 (25th)	Lily Tomlin	Rowan & Martin's Laugh-In	NBC
1974 (26th)
1974 (26th)	Supporting Actor		
1974 (26th)	Harvey Korman	The Carol Burnett Show	CBS
1974 (26th)	Foster Brooks	The Dean Martin Show	NBC
1974 (26th)	Tim Conway	The Carol Burnett Show	CBS
1974 (26th)	Supporting Actress		
1974 (26th)	Brenda Vaccaro	The Shape of Things	NBC
1974 (26th)	Ruth Buzzi	The Dean Martin Show	NBC
1974 (26th)	Lee Grant	The Shape of Things	NBC
1974 (26th)	Vicki Lawrence	The Carol Burnett Show	CBS
1975 (27th)
1975 (27th)	Supporting Actor		
1975 (27th)	Jack Albertson	Cher	CBS
1975 (27th)	Tim Conway	The Carol Burnett Show	CBS
1975 (27th)	John Denver	Doris Day Today	CBS
1975 (27th)	Supporting Actress		
1975 (27th)	Cloris Leachman	Cher	CBS
1975 (27th)	Vicki Lawrence	The Carol Burnett Show	CBS
1975 (27th)	Rita Moreno	Out to Lunch	ABC
1976 (28th)
1976 (28th)	Supporting Actor		
1976 (28th)	Chevy Chase	NBC's Saturday Night	NBC
1976 (28th)	Tim Conway	The Carol Burnett Show	CBS
1976 (28th)	Harvey Korman	The Carol Burnett Show	CBS
1976 (28th)	Supporting Actress		
1976 (28th)	Vicki Lawrence	The Carol Burnett Show	CBS
1976 (28th)	Cloris Leachman	Telly... Who Loves Ya, Baby?	CBS
1977 (29th)
1977 (29th)	Supporting Actor		
1977 (29th)	Tim Conway	The Carol Burnett Show	CBS
1977 (29th)	John Belushi	Saturday Night Live	NBC
1977 (29th)	Chevy Chase	Saturday Night Live	NBC
1977 (29th)	Harvey Korman	The Carol Burnett Show	CBS
1977 (29th)	Ben Vereen	The Bell Telephone Jubilee	NBC
1977 (29th)	Supporting Actress		
1977 (29th)	Rita Moreno	The Muppet Show	Syndicated
1977 (29th)	Vicki Lawrence	The Carol Burnett Show	CBS
1977 (29th)	Gilda Radner	Saturday Night Live	NBC
1977 (29th)	Achievement in Coverage of Special Events — Individuals (Note: As a juried award, nominees had to garner 50% approval to win the award. The nominee did not meet the benchmark and no award was given.)		
1977 (29th)	Helen O'Connell	Miss Universe Beauty Pageant	CBS
1978 (30th)
1978 (30th)	Supporting Actor		
1978 (30th)	Tim Conway	The Carol Burnett Show	CBS
1978 (30th)	Dan Aykroyd	Saturday Night Live	NBC
1978 (30th)	John Belushi	Saturday Night Live	NBC
1978 (30th)	Louis Gossett Jr.	The Sentry Collection Presents Ben Vereen: His Roots	ABC
1978 (30th)	Peter Sellers	The Muppet Show	Syndicated
1978 (30th)	Supporting Actress		
1978 (30th)	Gilda Radner	Saturday Night Live	NBC
1978 (30th)	Beatrice Arthur	Laugh-In	NBC
1978 (30th)	Jane Curtin	Saturday Night Live	NBC
1978 (30th)	Dolly Parton	Cher... Special	ABC
1978 (30th)	Bernadette Peters	The Muppet Show	Syndicated
1978 (30th)	Special Classification of Outstanding Individual Achievement (Note: As a juried award, nominees had to garner 50% approval to win the award. The nominee did not meet the benchmark and no award was given.)		
1978 (30th)	Mikhail Baryshnikov	The Nutcracker	CBS
1979 (31st)	Individual Achievement – Special Events (Note: As a juried award, nominees had to garner 50% approval to win the award.)		
1979 (31st)	Mikhail Baryshnikov	Baryshnikov at the White House	PBS

=== 1980s ===
Year	Performer	Program	Network
1980 (32nd)
1980 (32nd)	Individual Achievement – Special Events (Note: As a juried award, nominees had to garner 50% approval to win the award. The nominee did not meet the benchmark and no award was given.)		
1980 (32nd)	Donald O'Connor	The 52nd Annual Academy Awards	ABC
1981 (33rd)
1981 (33rd)	Individual Achievement – Special Class (Note: As a juried award, nominees had to garner 50% approval to win the award.)		
1981 (33rd)	Sarah Vaughan	Rhapsody and Song – A Tribute to George Gershwin (Great Performances)	PBS
1982 (34th)
1982 (34th)	Individual Achievement – Special Class (Note: As a juried award, nominees had to garner 50% approval to win the award.)		
1982 (34th)	Nell Carter	Ain't Misbehavin'	NBC
1982 (34th)	André De Shields	Ain't Misbehavin'	NBC
1982 (34th)	Gregory Hines	I Love Liberty	ABC
1983 (35th)
1983 (35th)	Leontyne Price	Leontyne Price, Zubin Mehta and the New York Philharmonic (Live from Lincoln Center)	PBS
1983 (35th)	Carol Burnett	Texaco Star Theater... Opening Night	NBC
1983 (35th)	Michael Jackson	Motown 25: Yesterday, Today, Forever	NBC
1983 (35th)	Luciano Pavarotti	Luciano Pavarotti and the New York Philharmonic (Live from Lincoln Center)	PBS
1983 (35th)	Richard Pryor	Motown 25: Yesterday, Today, Forever	NBC
1984 (36th)
1984 (36th)	Individual Performance in a Variety or Music Program		
1984 (36th)	Cloris Leachman	Screen Actors Guild 50th Anniversary Celebration	CBS
1984 (36th)	Debbie Allen	Live... And in Person	NBC
1984 (36th)	George Burns	George Burns Celebrates 80 Years in Show Business	NBC
1984 (36th)	Eddie Murphy	Saturday Night Live	NBC
1984 (36th)	Joe Piscopo	Saturday Night Live	NBC
1984 (36th)	Lily Tomlin	Live... And in Person	NBC
1984 (36th)	Individual Achievement - Classical Music/Dance Programming (Note: As a juried award, nominees had to garner 50% approval to win the award.)		
1984 (36th)	James Levine	Live from the Met Centennial Gala	PBS
1984 (36th)	Leontyne Price	In Performance at the White House: An Evening of Spirituals and Gospel Music	PBS
1985 (37th)
1985 (37th)	Individual Performance in a Variety or Music Program		
1985 (37th)	George Hearn	Sweeney Todd: The Demon Barber of Fleet Street (Great Performances)	PBS
1985 (37th)	Billy Crystal	Saturday Night Live	NBC
1985 (37th)	Gregory Hines	Motown Returns to the Apollo	NBC
1985 (37th)	Patti LaBelle	Motown Returns to the Apollo	NBC
1985 (37th)	Angela Lansbury	Sweeney Todd: The Demon Barber of Fleet Street (Great Performances)	PBS
1985 (37th)	Individual Achievement - Classical Music/Dance Programming - Performing (Note: As a juried award, nominees had to garner 50% approval to win the award.)		
1985 (37th)	Luciano Pavarotti	Rigoletto (Great Performances)	PBS
1986 (38th)
1986 (38th)	Individual Performance in a Variety or Music Program		
1986 (38th)	Whitney Houston	The 28th Annual Grammy Awards	CBS
1986 (38th)	Debbie Allen	An All-Star Celebration Honoring Martin Luther King Jr.	NBC
1986 (38th)	Patti LaBelle	Sylvia Fine Kaye's Musical Comedy Tonight III (Great Performances)	PBS
1986 (38th)	Jon Lovitz	Saturday Night Live	NBC
1986 (38th)	Sarah Vaughan	The 28th Annual Grammy Awards	CBS
1986 (38th)	Stevie Wonder	An All-Star Celebration Honoring Martin Luther King Jr.	NBC
1986 (38th)	Individual Achievement - Classical Music/Dance Programming (Note: As a juried award, nominees had to garner 50% approval to win the award. The nominee did not meet the benchmark and no award was given.)		
1986 (38th)	Plácido Domingo	Cavalleria Rusticana (Great Performances)	PBS
1987 (39th)		Cavalleria Rusticana (Great Performances)	
1987 (39th)	Individual Performance in a Variety or Music Program		
1987 (39th)	Robin Williams	A Carol Burnett Special: Carol, Carl, Whoopi & Robin	ABC
1987 (39th)	Billy Crystal	The 29th Annual Grammy Awards	CBS
1987 (39th)	Julie Kavner	The Tracey Ullman Show	Fox
1987 (39th)	Angela Lansbury	The 1987 Tony Awards	CBS
1987 (39th)	Jon Lovitz	Saturday Night Live	NBC
1987 (39th)	Individual Achievement - Classical Music/Dance Programming - Performing (Note: As a juried award, nominees had to garner 50% approval to win the award.)		
1987 (39th)	Leonard Bernstein	Carnegie Hall: The Grand Reopening	CBS
1987 (39th)	Isaac Stern	Carnegie Hall: The Grand Reopening	CBS
1988 (40th)
1988 (40th)	Individual Performance in a Variety or Music Program		
1988 (40th)	Robin Williams	ABC Presents a Royal Gala	ABC
1988 (40th)	Mikhail Baryshnikov	Celebrating Gershwin (Great Performances)	PBS
1988 (40th)	Ray Charles	Irving Berlin's 100th Birthday Celebration	CBS
1988 (40th)	Billy Crystal	An All-Star Toast to the Improv	HBO
1988 (40th)	Julie Kavner	The Tracey Ullman Show	Fox
1988 (40th)	Individual Achievement - Classical (Note: As a juried award, nominees had to garner 50% approval to win the award. The nominees did not meet the benchmark and no award was given.)		
1988 (40th)	Mikhail Baryshnikov	Dance in America: David Gordon's Made in U.S.A. (Great Performances)	PBS
1988 (40th)	Plácido Domingo	Aida: From the Houston Grand Opera (Great Performances)	PBS
1988 (40th)	Individual Achievement - Special Events (Note: As a juried award, nominees had to garner 50% approval to win the award. The nominee did not meet the benchmark and no award was given.)		
1988 (40th)	Billy Crystal	The 30th Annual Grammy Awards	CBS
1989 (41st)
1989 (41st)	Individual Performance in a Variety or Music Program		
1989 (41st)	Linda Ronstadt	Canciones de Mi Padre (Great Performances)	PBS
1989 (41st)	Dana Carvey	Saturday Night Live	NBC
1989 (41st)	Julie Kavner	The Tracey Ullman Show	Fox
1989 (41st)	Thom Fountain, Sandey Grinn, Maurice LaMarche, John Lovelady, Steve Sherman, Van Snowden, Fred Spencer, Allan Trautman and Todd Walcott	Sid and Marty Krofft's D.C. Follies (Episode 202)	Syndicated
1989 (41st)	Thom Fountain, Sandey Grinn, John Lovelady, John Roarke, Steve Sherman, Van Snowden, Fred Spencer, Allan Trautman and Todd Walcott	Sid and Marty Krofft's D.C. Follies (Episode 211)	Syndicated
1989 (41st)	Individual Performance in Classical Music/Dance Programming		
1989 (41st)	Mikhail Baryshnikov	Dance in America: Baryshnikov Dances Balanchine (Great Performances)	PBS
1989 (41st)	Performance in Special Events		
1989 (41st)	Billy Crystal	The 31st Annual Grammy Awards	CBS

=== 1990s ===
Year	Performer	Program	Network
1990 (42nd)
1990 (42nd)	Tracey Ullman	The Best of the Tracey Ullman Show	Fox
1990 (42nd)	Dana Carvey	Saturday Night Live	NBC
1990 (42nd)	Billy Crystal	Billy Crystal: Midnight Train to Moscow	HBO
1990 (42nd)	Julie Kavner	The Tracey Ullman Show	Fox
1990 (42nd)	Angela Lansbury	The 43rd Annual Tony Awards	CBS
1991 (43rd)
1991 (43rd)	Billy Crystal	The 63rd Annual Academy Awards	ABC
1991 (43rd)	Dana Carvey	Saturday Night Live	NBC
1991 (43rd)	Harry Connick Jr.	Swinging Out with Harry (Great Performances)	PBS
1991 (43rd)	Damon Wayans	In Living Color	Fox
1991 (43rd)	Keenen Ivory Wayans	In Living Color	Fox
1992 (44th)
1992 (44th)	Bette Midler	The Tonight Show Starring Johnny Carson	NBC
1992 (44th)	George Carlin	George Carlin Live at Paramount: Jammin' in New York	HBO
1992 (44th)	Dana Carvey	Saturday Night Live	NBC
1992 (44th)	Natalie Cole	Unforgettable, with Love: Natalie Cole Sings the Songs of Nat King Cole (Great Performances)	PBS
1992 (44th)	Billy Crystal	The 64th Annual Academy Awards	ABC
1993 (45th)
1993 (45th)	Dana Carvey	Saturday Night Live	NBC
1993 (45th)	Cirque du Soleil	The Tonight Show with Jay Leno	NBC
1993 (45th)	Billy Crystal	The 65th Annual Academy Awards	ABC
1993 (45th)	Liza Minnelli	Liza Minnelli Live from Radio City Music Hall	PBS
1993 (45th)	Lily Tomlin	The Search for Signs of Intelligent Life in the Universe	Showtime
1994 (46th)
1994 (46th)	Tracey Ullman	Tracey Ullman Takes On New York	HBO
1994 (46th)	Whoopi Goldberg	The 66th Annual Academy Awards	ABC
1994 (46th)	Phil Hartman	Saturday Night Live	NBC
1994 (46th)	Mike Myers	Saturday Night Live	NBC
1994 (46th)	Lily Tomlin	Growing Up Funny	Lifetime
1995 (47th)
1995 (47th)	Barbra Streisand	Barbra Streisand: The Concert	HBO
1995 (47th)	Julie Andrews	The Sound of Julie Andrews	Disney
1995 (47th)	Carol Burnett	Men, Movies and Carol	CBS
1995 (47th)	Rosie O'Donnell (Note: In 1995, Dennis Miller was nominated for his HBO talkshow Dennis Miller Live. His nomination was belatedly rescinded after the Academy said it discovered rules do not allow the host of a variety or music series to be nominated for the same program if the host's name is in the title. Sixth place finisher Rosie O'Donnell was named as the replacement nominee.)	Rosie O'Donnell Comedy Special	HBO
1995 (47th)	Tracey Ullman	Women of the Night	HBO
1996 (48th)
1996 (48th)	Tony Bennett	Tony Bennett Live by Request: A Valentine Special	A&E
1996 (48th)	Billy Crystal, Whoopi Goldberg and Robin Williams	Comic Relief VII	HBO
1996 (48th)	Ellen DeGeneres	The 38th Annual Grammy Awards	CBS
1996 (48th)	Whoopi Goldberg	The 68th Annual Academy Awards	NBC
1996 (48th)	Tracey Ullman	The Best of Tracey Takes On...	HBO
1997 (49th)
1997 (49th)	Bette Midler	Bette Midler: Diva Las Vegas	HBO
1997 (49th)	George Carlin	George Carlin: 40 Years of Comedy	HBO
1997 (49th)	Billy Crystal	The 69th Annual Academy Awards	ABC
1997 (49th)	Bill Maher	Politically Incorrect with Bill Maher	ABC
1997 (49th)	Tracey Ullman	Tracey Takes On...	HBO
1998 (50th)
1998 (50th)	Billy Crystal	The 70th Annual Academy Awards	ABC
1998 (50th)	Garth Brooks	Garth: Live from Central Park	HBO
1998 (50th)	Michael Crawford	Michael Crawford in Concert	PBS
1998 (50th)	Jay Leno	The Tonight Show with Jay Leno	NBC
1998 (50th)	David Letterman	Late Show with David Letterman	CBS
1998 (50th)	Tracey Ullman	Tracey Takes On...	HBO
1999 (51st)
1999 (51st)	John Leguizamo	John Leguizamo's Freak	HBO
1999 (51st)	George Carlin	George Carlin: You Are All Diseased	HBO
1999 (51st)	Dennis Miller	Dennis Miller Live	HBO
1999 (51st)	Chris Rock	The Chris Rock Show	HBO
1999 (51st)	Tracey Ullman	Tracey Takes On...	HBO

=== 2000s ===
Year	Performer	Program	Network
2000 (52nd)
2000 (52nd)	Eddie Izzard	Eddie Izzard: Dress to Kill	HBO
2000 (52nd)	Cher	Cher: Live in Concert — From the MGM Grand in Las Vegas	HBO
2000 (52nd)	Billy Crystal	The 72nd Annual Academy Awards	ABC
2000 (52nd)	Chris Rock	Chris Rock: Bigger and Blacker	HBO
2000 (52nd)	Molly Shannon	Saturday Night Live	NBC
2001 (53rd)
2001 (53rd)	Barbra Streisand	Barbra Streisand: Timeless	Fox
2001 (53rd)	Wayne Brady	Whose Line Is It Anyway?	ABC
2001 (53rd)	Ellen DeGeneres	Ellen DeGeneres: The Beginning	HBO
2001 (53rd)	Will Ferrell	Saturday Night Live	NBC
2001 (53rd)	David Letterman	Late Show with David Letterman	CBS
2001 (53rd)	Steve Martin	The 73rd Annual Academy Awards	ABC
2002 (54th)
2002 (54th)	Sting	A&E in Concert: Sting In Tuscany... All This Time	A&E
2002 (54th)	Wayne Brady	Whose Line Is It Anyway?	ABC
2002 (54th)	Billy Joel	Billy Joel: In His Own Words	A&E
2002 (54th)	Jon Stewart	The Daily Show with Jon Stewart	Comedy Central
2002 (54th)	Ryan Stiles	Whose Line Is It Anyway?	ABC
2003 (55th)
2003 (55th)	Wayne Brady	Whose Line Is It Anyway?	ABC
2003 (55th)	Dennis Miller	Dennis Miller: The Raw Feed	HBO
2003 (55th)	Martin Short	Primetime Glick	Comedy Central
2003 (55th)	Jon Stewart	The Daily Show with Jon Stewart	Comedy Central
2003 (55th)	Robin Williams	Robin Williams: Live on Broadway	HBO
2004 (56th)
2004 (56th)	Elaine Stritch	Elaine Stritch: At Liberty	HBO
2004 (56th)	Billy Crystal	The 76th Annual Academy Awards	ABC
2004 (56th)	Ellen DeGeneres	Ellen DeGeneres: Here and Now	HBO
2004 (56th)	Bill Maher	Real Time with Bill Maher	HBO
2004 (56th)	Tracey Ullman	Tracey Ullman in the Trailer Tales	HBO
2005 (57th)
2005 (57th)	Hugh Jackman	58th Tony Awards	CBS
2005 (57th)	Whoopi Goldberg	Whoopi: Back to Broadway — The 20th Anniversary	HBO
2005 (57th)	Jay Leno	The Tonight Show with Jay Leno	NBC
2005 (57th)	Jon Stewart	The Daily Show with Jon Stewart	Comedy Central
2005 (57th)	Tracey Ullman	Tracey Ullman: Live and Exposed	HBO
2006 (58th)
2006 (58th)	Barry Manilow	Barry Manilow: Music and Passion	PBS
2006 (58th)	Stephen Colbert	The Colbert Report	Comedy Central
2006 (58th)	Craig Ferguson	The Late Late Show with Craig Ferguson	CBS
2006 (58th)	Hugh Jackman	The 59th Annual Tony Awards	CBS
2006 (58th)	David Letterman	Late Show with David Letterman	CBS
2007 (59th)
2007 (59th)	Tony Bennett	Tony Bennett: An American Classic	NBC
2007 (59th)	Stephen Colbert	The Colbert Report	Comedy Central
2007 (59th)	Ellen DeGeneres	The 79th Annual Academy Awards	ABC
2007 (59th)	David Letterman	Late Show with David Letterman	CBS
2007 (59th)	Jon Stewart	The Daily Show with Jon Stewart	Comedy Central
2008 (60th)
2008 (60th)	Don Rickles	Mr. Warmth: The Don Rickles Project	HBO
2008 (60th)	Stephen Colbert	The Colbert Report	Comedy Central
2008 (60th)	Tina Fey	Saturday Night Live	NBC
2008 (60th)	David Letterman	Late Show with David Letterman	CBS
2008 (60th)	Jon Stewart	The 80th Annual Academy Awards	ABC

== Total awards by network ==
- CBS – 25
- NBC – 12
- PBS – 10
- HBO – 7
- ABC – 5
- A&E – 2
- Fox – 2
- Syndicated – 1

== Performers with multiple awards ==
4 awards

- Harvey Korman (2 consecutive)

3 awards

- Tim Conway
- Billy Crystal

2 awards

- Mikhail Baryshnikov
- Tony Bennett
- Carol Burnett (consecutive)
- Art Carney (consecutive)
- Cloris Leachman
- Bette Midler
- Leontyne Price (consecutive)
- Barbra Streisand
- Tracey Ullman
- Robin Williams (consecutive)

== Performers with multiple nominations ==
14 nominations

- Billy Crystal

9 nominations

- Tracey Ullman

7 nominations

- Harvey Korman

6 nominations

- Tim Conway
- Lily Tomlin

5 nominations

- Mikhail Baryshnikov
- Dana Carvey
- David Letterman
- Jon Stewart

4 nominations

- Carol Burnett
- Ellen DeGeneres
- Whoopi Goldberg
- Julie Kavner
- Vicki Lawrence
- Robin Williams

3 nominations

- Wayne Brady
- George Carlin
- Stephen Colbert
- Arte Johnson
- Angela Lansbury
- Cloris Leachman
- Dinah Shore
- Barbra Streisand

2 nominations

- Edie Adams
- Debbie Allen
- Fred Astaire
- Harry Belafonte
- John Belushi
- Tony Bennett
- Ruth Buzzi
- Art Carney
- Chevy Chase
- Perry Como
- Plácido Domingo
- Judy Garland
- Goldie Hawn
- Gregory Hines
- Hugh Jackman
- Danny Kaye
- Patti LaBelle
- Jay Leno
- Jon Lovitz
- Bill Maher
- Bette Midler
- Dennis Miller
- Liza Minnelli
- Rita Moreno
- Luciano Pavarotti
- Leontyne Price
- Gilda Radner
- Chris Rock
- Sarah Vaughan
- Andy Williams
