= Primetime Emmy Award for Outstanding Variety Special (Pre-Recorded) =

Honor awarded to television specials

- Awarded for: Outstanding Variety Special (Pre-Recorded)
- Country: United States
- Presented by: Academy of Television Arts & Sciences
- First award: 1959
- Currently held by: The Muppet Show (2026)
- Website: emmys.com

The Primetime Emmy Award for Outstanding Variety Special (Pre-Recorded) is a category at the Primetime Emmy Awards. It is awarded annually to the singularly best pre-recorded varietal, musical or comedic special of the year. It was previously presented as Outstanding Variety Special until it was restructured alongside Outstanding Special Class Program for the 70th Primetime Emmy Awards.

The Kennedy Center Honors has won seven awards, including five consecutive wins from 2009 to 2013. It also won twice for Outstanding Variety Series when the two categories were combined.

== Winners and nominations ==
=== 1950s ===
Year	Program	Producers	Network
1959 (11th)
1959 (11th)	Best Special Musical or Variety Program – One Hour or Longer		
1959 (11th)	An Evening with Fred Astaire	—	NBC
1959 (11th)	Art Carney Meets "Peter and the Wolf"	—	NBC

=== 1960s ===
Year	Program	Producers	Network
1960 (12th)
1960 (12th)	Outstanding Achievement in the Field of Music		
1960 (12th)	Leonard Bernstein and the New York Philharmonic in Moscow	—	CBS
1960 (12th)	The Bell Telephone Hour "The Music of George Gershwin"	—	NBC
1960 (12th)	Hallmark Hall of Fame "The Green Pastures"	—	NBC
1960 (12th)	Young People's Concerts	—	CBS
1962 (14th)
1962 (14th)	Outstanding Program Achievements in the Fields of Variety and Music – Music Program		
1962 (14th)	Leonard Bernstein and the New York Philharmonic in Japan	—	CBS
1962 (14th)	The Bell Telephone Hour	—	NBC
1962 (14th)	NBC Opera	—	NBC
1962 (14th)	The Thief and the Hangman	—	ABC
1963 (15th)
1963 (15th)	Outstanding Program Achievement in the Field of Music		
1963 (15th)	Julie and Carol at Carnegie Hall	—	CBS
1963 (15th)	The Bell Telephone Hour	—	NBC
1963 (15th)	Judy Garland and Her Guests, Phil Silvers and Robert Goulet	—	CBS
1963 (15th)	The Lively Ones	—	NBC
1963 (15th)	NBC Opera	—	NBC
1964 (16th)
1964 (16th)	Outstanding Program Achievement in the Field of Music		
1964 (16th)	The Bell Telephone Hour	—	NBC
1964 (16th)	The Lively Ones	—	NBC
1964 (16th)	New York Philharmonic Young People's Concerts with Leonard Bernstein	—	CBS
1966 (18th)
1966 (18th)	Outstanding Musical Program		
1966 (18th)	Frank Sinatra: A Man and His Music	Dwight Hemion, producer	NBC
1966 (18th)	The Bell Telephone Hour	Barry Wood, executive producer	NBC
1966 (18th)	The Bolshoi Ballet	Ted Mills, producer	Syndicated
1966 (18th)	Color Me Barbra	Joe Layton and Dwight Hemion, producers	CBS
1966 (18th)	New York Philharmonic Young People's Concerts with Leonard Bernstein	Roger Englander, producer	CBS
1966 (18th)	Outstanding Variety Special		
1966 (18th)	Chrysler Presents The Bob Hope Christmas Special	Bob Hope, executive producer	NBC
1966 (18th)	An Evening with Carol Channing	Bud Yorkin, producer	CBS
1966 (18th)	Jimmy Durante Meets the Lively Arts	Alan Handley and Bob Wynn, producers	ABC
1966 (18th)	The Julie Andrews Show	Alan Handley, producer	NBC
1966 (18th)	The Swinging World of Sammy Davis, Jr.	Stan Greene, producer	Syndicated
1967 (19th)
1967 (19th)	Outstanding Musical Program		
1967 (19th)	Brigadoon	Fielder Cook, producer	CBS
1967 (19th)	The Bell Telephone Hour "Toscanini: The Maestro Revisited"	Gerald Green, producer	NBC
1967 (19th)	Frank Sinatra: A Man and His Music – Part II	Dwight Hemion, producer	CBS
1967 (19th)	Outstanding Variety Special		
1967 (19th)	The Sid Caesar, Imogene Coca, Carl Reiner, Howard Morris Special	Jack Arnold, producer	CBS
1967 (19th)	ABC Stage 67 "A Time for Laughter: A Look at Negro Humor in America"	Phil Stein, producer	ABC
1967 (19th)	Chrysler Presents The Bob Hope Christmas Special	Bob Hope, executive producer	NBC
1967 (19th)	Dick Van Dyke	Jack Donohue and Byron Paul, producers	CBS

Outstanding Variety or Musical Program

Year	Program	Producers	Network
1968 (20th)
1968 (20th)	Rowan & Martin's Laugh-In "Pilot"	George Schlatter, producer	NBC
1968 (20th)	Chrysler Presents The Bob Hope Show	Bob Hope, executive producer	NET
1968 (20th)	The Fred Astaire Show	Fred Astaire and Gil Rodin, producers	NBC
1968 (20th)	Herb Alpert and the Tijuana Brass	Dwight Hemion and Gary Smith, producers	CBS
1968 (20th)	Lincoln Center/Stage 5	Jac Venza, producer	NET
1968 (20th)	A Man and His Music + Ella + Jobim	Robert Scheerer, producer	NBC
1969 (21st)
1969 (21st)	The Bill Cosby Special	Roy Silver, executive producer; Bill Persky, Sam Denoff and Bill Hobin, producers; Bill Cosby, star	NBC
1969 (21st)	Barbra Streisand: A Happening in Central Park	Robert Scheerer, producer; Barbra Streisand, star	CBS
1969 (21st)	Duke Ellington – A Concert of Sacred Music (NET Playhouse)	Ralph J. Gleason and Richard Moore, producers; Duke Ellington, star	NET
1969 (21st)	Francis Albert Sinatra Does His Thing	Ernest Chambers and Saul Ilson, producers; Frank Sinatra, star	CBS
1969 (21st)	The Rite of Spring (NET Festival)	Robert Foshko, producer; Zubin Mehta, conductor	NET
1969 (21st)	Rowan & Martin's Laugh-In	Paul Keyes and Carolyn Raskin, producers; Dan Rowan and Dick Martin, stars	NBC
1969 (21st)	Vladimir Horowitz: A Television Concert at Carnegie Hall	Roger Englander, producer; Vladimir Horowitz, pianist	CBS

=== 1970s ===
Year	Program	Producers	Network
1970 (22nd)
1970 (22nd)	Outstanding Variety or Musical Program – Classical Music		
1970 (22nd)	Cinderella: National Ballet of Canada (NET Festival)	Curtis W. Davis, executive producer; Thomas Slevin, producer; Leopold Stokowski, performer	PBS
1970 (22nd)	S. Hurok Presents	James Krayer, executive producer; Roger Englander, producer	CBS
1970 (22nd)	Sounds of Summer: The Blossom Music Center with Pierre Boulez	Craig Gilbert, executive producer; Jack Sameth, producer	NET
1970 (22nd)	The Switched-On Symphony	Pierre Cossette and Burt Sugarman, executive producers; Jack Good, producer	NBC
1970 (22nd)	Outstanding Variety or Musical Program – Variety and Popular Music		
1970 (22nd)	Annie, the Women in the Life of a Man	Joseph Cates, executive producer; Martin Charnin, producer; Anne Bancroft, performer	CBS
1970 (22nd)	The Friars Club "Roasts" Jack Benny (Kraft Music Hall)	Gary Smith and Dwight Hemion, producers; Jack Benny, performer	NBC
1970 (22nd)	The Second Bill Cosby Special	Roy Silver, executive producer; Bruce Campbell, producer; Bill Cosby, performer	NBC
1970 (22nd)	Sinatra	Frank Sinatra, executive producer/performer; Carolyn Raskin, producer	CBS
1970 (22nd)	The Sound of Burt Bacharach (Kraft Music Hall)	Gary Smith and Dwight Hemion, producers; Burt Bacharach, performer	NBC
1971 (23rd)
1971 (23rd)	Outstanding Variety or Musical Program – Classical Music		
1971 (23rd)	Leopold Stokowski (NET Festival)	Curtis W. Davis, executive producer; Thomas Slevin, producer; Leopold Stokowski, performer	PBS
1971 (23rd)	Swan Lake (NET Fanfare)	John Barnes and Curtis W. Davis, executive producers; Norman Campbell, producer	PBS
1971 (23rd)	The Queen of Spades (NET Opera Theatre)	Peter Herman Adler, producer	PBS
1971 (23rd)	Outstanding Variety or Musical Program – Variety and Popular Music		
1971 (23rd)	Singer Presents Burt Bacharach	Gary Smith and Dwight Hemion, producers; Burt Bacharach, performer	CBS
1971 (23rd)	Another Evening with Burt Bacharach	Gary Smith and Dwight Hemion, producers; Burt Bacharach, performer	NBC
1971 (23rd)	Harry and Lena	Chiz Schultz, producer; Harry Belafonte and Lena Horne, performers	ABC
1972 (24th)
1972 (24th)	Outstanding Variety or Musical Program – Classical Music		
1972 (24th)	Bernstein on Beethoven: A Celebration in Vienna	James Krayer, executive producer; Humphrey Burton, producer; Leonard Bernstein, performer	CBS
1972 (24th)	Heifetz Bell System Family Theatre	Lester Shurr, executive producer; Paul Louis, producer; Jascha Heifetz, performer	NBC
1972 (24th)	The Peking Ballet: First Spectacular from China	Lucy Jarvis, producer	NBC
1972 (24th)	The Trial of Mary Lincoln (NET Opera Theatre)	Peter Herman Adler, executive producer; Peter Griffiths, producer	PBS
1972 (24th)	Outstanding Variety or Musical Program – Variety and Popular Music		
1972 (24th)	Jack Lemmon in 'S Wonderful, 'S Marvelous, 'S Gershwin	Joseph Cates, executive producer; Martin Charnin, producer; Jack Lemmon, performer	NBC
1972 (24th)	The Flip Wilson Show "Sammy Davis, Jr., Lily Tomlin and Ed McMahon"	Monte Kay, executive producer; Bob Henry, producer; Flip Wilson, performer	NBC
1972 (24th)	Julie and Carol at Lincoln Center	Joe Hamilton, producer; Julie Andrews and Carol Burnett, performers	CBS
1972 (24th)	The Sonny & Cher Comedy Hour "Tony Randall and Honey Cone"	Allan Blye and Chris Bearde, producers; Sonny Bono and Cher, performers	CBS
1973 (25th)
1973 (25th)	Outstanding Single Program – Variety and Popular Music		
1973 (25th)	Liza with a Z	Bob Fosse and Fred Ebb, producers; Liza Minnelli, performer	NBC
1973 (25th)	Applause	Alexander H. Cohen, executive producer; Joseph Kipness, Lawrence Kasha and Richard M. Rosenbloom, producers	CBS
1973 (25th)	Once Upon a Mattress	Joe Hamilton, producer	CBS
1974 (26th)
1974 (26th)	Outstanding Comedy-Variety, Variety or Music Special		
1974 (26th)	Lily	Irene Pinn, executive producer; Jerry McPhie and Herbert Sargent, producers; Lily Tomlin, performer	CBS
1974 (26th)	Barbra Streisand...and Other Musical Instruments	Martin Erlichman, executive producer; Gary Smith, Dwight Hemion and Joe Layton, producers; Barbra Streisand, performer	CBS
1974 (26th)	The John Denver Show	Jerry Weintraub, executive producer; Al Rogers and Rich Eustis, producers; John Denver, performer	ABC
1974 (26th)	Magnavox Presents Frank Sinatra	Howard W. Koch, producer; Frank Sinatra, performer	NBC

Outstanding Special – Comedy, Variety or Music

Year	Program	Producers	Network
1975 (27th)
1975 (27th)	An Evening with John Denver	Jerry Weintraub, executive producer; Al Rogers and Rich Eustis, producers; John Denver, performer	ABC
1975 (27th)	Lily	Irene Pinn, executive producer; Jane Wagner and Lorne Michaels, producers; Lily Tomlin, performer	ABC
1975 (27th)	Shirley MacLaine: If They Could See Me Now	Bob Wells, producer; Shirley MacLaine, performer	CBS
1976 (28th)
1976 (28th)	Gypsy in My Soul	William O. Harbach, executive producer; Cy Coleman and Fred Ebb, producers; Shirley MacLaine, performer	CBS
1976 (28th)	John Denver: Rocky Mountain Christmas	Jerry Weintraub, executive producer; Al Rogers and Rich Eustis, producers; John Denver, performer	CBS
1976 (28th)	Lily Tomlin	Irene Pinn, executive producer; Jane Wagner and Lorne Michaels, producers; Lily Tomlin, performer	ABC
1976 (28th)	The Monty Python Show: Wide World Special	Ian MacNaughton, producer	ABC
1976 (28th)	Steve and Eydie: "Our Love Is Here to Stay"	Gary Smith, executive producer; Dwight Hemion, producer; Steve Lawrence and Eydie Gormé, performers	CBS
1977 (29th)
1977 (29th)	The Barry Manilow Special	Miles Lourie, executive producer; Steve Binder, producer; Barry Manilow, performer	ABC
1977 (29th)	Doug Henning's World of Magic	Jerry Goldstein, executive producer; Walter C. Miller, producer; Doug Henning, performer	NBC
1977 (29th)	The Neil Diamond Special	Jerry Weintraub, executive producer; Gary Smith and Dwight Hemion, producers; Neil Diamond, performer	NBC
1977 (29th)	The Shirley MacLaine Special: Where Do We Go from Here?	George Schlatter, producer; Shirley MacLaine, performer	CBS
1977 (29th)	Sills and Burnett at the Met	Joe Hamilton, producer; Beverly Sills and Carol Burnett, performers	CBS
1978 (30th)
1978 (30th)	Bette Midler: Ol' Red Hair Is Back	Aaron Russo, executive producer; Gary Smith and Dwight Hemion, producers; Bette Midler, performer	NBC
1978 (30th)	Doug Henning's World of Magic	Jerry Goldstein, executive producer; Walter C. Miller, producer; Doug Henning, performer	NBC
1978 (30th)	The George Burns One-Man Show	Irving Fein, executive producer; Stan Harris, producer; George Burns, performer	CBS
1978 (30th)	Neil Diamond: I'm Glad You're Here With Me Tonight	Jerry Weintraub, executive producer; Art Fisher, producer; Neil Diamond, performer	NBC
1978 (30th)	The Second Barry Manilow Special	Miles Lourie, executive producer; Ernest Chambers, producer; Barry Manilow, producer/performer	ABC

From 1979 to 1989, the category was combined as Outstanding Variety, Music or Comedy Program.

=== 1990s ===
Outstanding Variety, Music or Comedy Special

Year	Program	Producers	Network
1990 (42nd)
1990 (42nd)	Sammy Davis Jr.'s 60th Anniversary Celebration	George Schlatter, producer; Jeff Margolis, Buz Kohan, Gary Necessary and Maria S. Schlatter, co-producers	ABC
1990 (42nd)	The 62nd Annual Academy Awards	Gilbert Cates, producer	ABC
1990 (42nd)	Billy Crystal: Midnight Train to Moscow	Billy Crystal and David Steinberg, executive producers; Robert Dalrymple, producer; Carmi Zlotnik, co-producer; Jay Roewe, line producer	HBO
1990 (42nd)	The 43rd Annual Tony Awards	Don Mischer, executive producer; David J. Goldberg, producer	CBS
1990 (42nd)	The Best of the Tracey Ullman Show	Jerry Belson, James L. Brooks, Heide Perlman and Sam Simon, executive producers; Marc Flanagan, supervising producer; Richard Sakai, Ted Bessell and Dinah Kirgo, producers; Jay Kogen and Wallace Wolodarsky, co-producers	Fox

In 1991, the category was combined as Outstanding Variety, Music or Comedy Program.

Outstanding Variety, Music or Comedy Program (Special)

Year	Program	Producers	Network
1992 (44th)
1992 (44th)	Cirque Du Soleil II: A New Expérience	Hélène Dufresne, producer	HBO
1992 (44th)	Comic Relief V	John Moffitt, Pat Tourk Lee and Bob Zmuda, executive producers	HBO
1992 (44th)	Unforgettable, with Love: Natalie Cole Sings the Songs of Nat King Cole (Great Performances)	Dan Cleary and Jac Venza, executive producers; David Horn, producer; John Walker, coordinating producer	PBS

Outstanding Variety, Music or Comedy Special

Year	Program	Producers	Network
1993 (45th)
1993 (45th)	Bob Hope: The First 90 Years	Linda Hope, executive producer; Nancy Malone, supervising producer; Don Mischer, producer	NBC
1993 (45th)	The 65th Annual Academy Awards	Gilbert Cates, producer	ABC
1993 (45th)	The Search for Signs of Intelligent Life in the Universe	Lily Tomlin and Jane Wagner, executive producers; Paula Mazur, producer	Showtime
1993 (45th)	Sondheim: A Celebration at Carnegie Hall (Great Performances)	David Horn and Jac Venza, executive producers; John Walker, producer	PBS
1993 (45th)	The 46th Annual Tony Awards	Joseph Cates, executive producer; Walter C. Miller, producer	CBS
1994 (46th)
1994 (46th)	The Kennedy Center Honors	George Stevens Jr. and Don Mischer, producers	CBS
1994 (46th)	The 66th Annual Academy Awards	Gilbert Cates, producer	ABC
1994 (46th)	Comic Relief VI	John Moffitt, Pat Tourk Lee and Bob Zmuda, executive producers	HBO
1994 (46th)	The 47th Annual Tony Awards	Gary Smith, executive producer	CBS
1994 (46th)	Tracey Ullman Takes On New York	Allan McKeown, executive producer; Marc Flanagan, supervising producer; David Wimbury, producer; John H. Starke, line producer	HBO
1995 (47th)
1995 (47th)	Barbra Streisand: The Concert	Martin Erlichman and Gary Smith, executive producers; Barbra Streisand and Dwight Hemion, producers	HBO
1995 (47th)	The 67th Annual Academy Awards	Gilbert Cates, producer	ABC
1995 (47th)	AFI Life Achievement Award: A Tribute to Steven Spielberg	George Stevens Jr., executive producer; Michael Stevens, producer	NBC
1995 (47th)	A Comedy Salute to Andy Kaufman	George Shapiro, Howard West, Bob Zmuda and John Davies, producers; Michael Petok, co-producer	NBC
1995 (47th)	Eagles: Hell Freezes Over	Irving Azoff and Joel Stillerman, executive producers; Carol Donovan, producer	MTV
1996 (48th)
1996 (48th)	The Kennedy Center Honors	George Stevens Jr. and Don Mischer, producers	CBS
1996 (48th)	The 68th Annual Academy Awards	Quincy Jones, executive producer; David Salzman, producer	ABC
1996 (48th)	The Best of Tracey Takes On...	Allan McKeown and Tracey Ullman, executive producers; Kevin Berg, Kim Fuller, Molly Newman, Jenji Kohan, Gail Parent, Tony Sheehan and Thomas Schlamme, producers; Ian La Frenais and Dick Clement, supervising producers; Allen J. Zipper, coordinating producer	HBO
1996 (48th)	Dennis Miller: Citizen Arcane	Dennis Miller, John Moffitt and Pat Tourk Lee, executive producers; Nancy Kurshner, supervising producer	HBO
1996 (48th)	Sinatra: 80 Years My Way	George Schlatter, executive producer; Maria S. Schlatter, producer; Donn Hoyer, co-producer; Buz Kohan and Gary Necessary, supervising producers	ABC
1997 (49th)
1997 (49th)	Chris Rock: Bring the Pain	Chris Rock, Michael Rotenberg and Sandy Chanley, executive producers; Tom Bull, producer	HBO
1997 (49th)	The 69th Annual Academy Awards	Gilbert Cates, producer	ABC
1997 (49th)	Bette Midler in Concert: Diva Las Vegas	Bette Midler and Bonnie Bruckheimer, executive producers; Marty Callner, producer; Bill Brigode, Douglas C. Forbes and Randall Gladstein, co-producer	HBO
1997 (49th)	George Carlin: 40 Years of Comedy	John Moffitt, Pat Tourk Lee, Stu Smiley and Brenda Carlin, executive producers; Kimber Rickabaugh, producer; Keiren Fisher, line producer; Nancy Kurshner, supervising producer	HBO
1997 (49th)	The 50th Annual Tony Awards	Gary Smith, executive producer; Walter C. Miller, producer; Roy Somlyo, supervising producer	CBS
1998 (50th)
1998 (50th)	The 1997 Tony Awards	Gary Smith, executive producer; Walter C. Miller, producer; Roy Somlyo, supervising producer	CBS
1998 (50th)	The 70th Annual Academy Awards	Gilbert Cates, producer	ABC
1998 (50th)	Christopher Reeve: A Celebration of Hope	Christopher Reeve, executive producer; Don Mischer, producer; Danette Herman, coordinating producer; Michael B. Seligman, supervising producer	ABC
1998 (50th)	Garth: Live from Central Park	Garth Brooks, executive producer; Jon Small, producer; Douglas C. Forbes, supervising producer; Shelby Werwa, line producer; Tom Forrest and Randall Gladstein, co-producers	HBO
1998 (50th)	Rodgers & Hammerstein's Cinderella	Whitney Houston, Debra Martin Chase, Craig Zadan, David R. Ginsburg and Neil Meron, executive producers; Chris Montan and Mike Moder, producers	ABC
1999 (51st)
1999 (51st)	The 1998 Tony Awards	Gary Smith, executive producer; Rosie O'Donnell, producer; Roy Somlyo, supervising producer	CBS
1999 (51st)	The 71st Annual Academy Awards	Gilbert Cates, producer	ABC
1999 (51st)	George Carlin: You Are All Diseased	George Carlin and Jerry Hamza, executive producers; Kimber Rickabaugh and Rocco Urbisci, producers	HBO
1999 (51st)	Jerry Seinfeld: "I'm Telling You for the Last Time"	Jerry Seinfeld, executive producer; Marty Callner, producer; Jeff Thorsen, line producer	HBO
1999 (51st)	John Leguizamo's Freak	John Leguizamo and Robert Morton, executive producer; David Bar Katz, co-executive producer; Denis Biggs, producer; Krysia Plonka, coordinating producer	HBO

=== 2000s ===
Year	Program	Producers	Network
2000 (52nd)
2000 (52nd)	Saturday Night Live: The 25th Anniversary Special	Lorne Michaels, executive producer; Ken Aymong, supervising producer; Marci Klein and Michael Shoemaker, producers	NBC
2000 (52nd)	The 72nd Annual Academy Awards	Michael B. Seligman, executive producer; Lili Fini Zanuck and Richard D. Zanuck, producers	ABC
2000 (52nd)	Chris Rock: Bigger & Blacker	Chris Rock, Michael Rotenberg and Sandy Chanley, executive producers; Tom Bull, producer	HBO
2000 (52nd)	Cirque du Soleil: Quidam	Peter Wagg, executive producer; Rocky Oldham, producer; Frances Berwick, network producer	Bravo
2000 (52nd)	Eddie Izzard: Dress to Kill	Eddie Izzard, executive producer; Charlie Swanson and Lawrence Jordan, producers	HBO
2001 (53rd)
2001 (53rd)	Cirque du Soleil's Dralion	Peter Wagg, executive producer; Rocky Oldham, producer; Frances Berwick, producer for Bravo	Bravo
2001 (53rd)	The 73rd Annual Academy Awards	Gilbert Cates, producer	ABC
2001 (53rd)	Bruce Springsteen & The E Street Band: Live in New York City	Jon Landau, George Travis and Bruce Springsteen, producers	HBO
2001 (53rd)	Ellen DeGeneres: The Beginning	Ellen DeGeneres and Joel Gallen, executive producers	HBO
2001 (53rd)	Saturday Night Live: Presidential Bash 2000	Lorne Michaels, executive producer; Ken Aymong and Marci Klein, supervising producers; James Downey, producer	NBC
2002 (54th)
2002 (54th)	America: A Tribute to Heroes	Joel Gallen, executive producer	Syndicated
2002 (54th)	The 74th Annual Academy Awards	Laura Ziskin, producer; Michael B. Seligman, supervising producer	ABC
2002 (54th)	Carol Burnett: Show Stoppers	Carol Burnett, John Hamilton and Rick Hawkins, executive producers; Jody Hamilton, producer; Mary Jo Blue, produced by	CBS
2002 (54th)	Cirque du Soleil's Alegria	Peter Wagg and Frances Berwick, executive producers; Rocky Oldham, producer	Bravo
2002 (54th)	The Concert for New York City	Gregory Sills and Fred Graver, executive producers; Paul Flattery, producer	VH1
2002 (54th)	Opening Ceremony: Salt Lake 2002 Olympic Winter Games	Don Mischer and Dick Ebersol, executive producers; David J. Goldberg, Geoff Bennett, Kenny Ortega and David Neal, producers	NBC
2003 (55th)
2003 (55th)	Cher: The Farewell Tour	Cher, Roger Davies, Lindsay Scott and Rocky Oldham, executive producers; Dione Orrom and Paul Morphos, producers	NBC
2003 (55th)	The 75th Annual Academy Awards	Gilbert Cates, producer	ABC
2003 (55th)	Bruce Springsteen & the E Street Band: Live in Barcelona	Jon Landau and Barbara Carr, executive producers; George Travis and Thom Zimny, producers	CBS
2003 (55th)	Robin Williams: Live on Broadway	Marsha Garces Williams and David Steinberg, executive producers; Marty Callner and Randall Gladstein, producers	HBO
2003 (55th)	Rolling Stones — Licks World Tour, Live from Madison Square Garden	Michael Cohl, executive producer; Marty Callner, Randall Gladstein, Steve Howard and Jake Berry, producers	HBO
2004 (56th)
2004 (56th)	Elaine Stritch at Liberty	Sheila Nevins, Richard Fell and Helen Asquith, executive producers; Scott Sanders and John Schreiber, co-executive producers; John Hoffman, supervising producer; Chris Hunt and Frazer Pennebaker, producers	HBO
2004 (56th)	A&E In Concert: Paul McCartney in Red Square	Delia Fine, executive producer; Mark Haefeli and Emilio Nunez, producers	A&E
2004 (56th)	The 76th Annual Academy Awards	Michael B. Seligman, executive producer; Joe Roth, producer	ABC
2004 (56th)	Chris Rock: Never Scared	Chris Rock, Michael Rotenberg and Joel Gallen, executive producers	HBO
2004 (56th)	Ellen DeGeneres: Here and Now	Ellen DeGeneres and Joel Gallen, executive producers	HBO
2005 (57th)
2005 (57th)	The 58th Annual Tony Awards	Ricky Kirshner and Glenn Weiss, executive producers	CBS
2005 (57th)	The 77th Annual Academy Awards	Gilbert Cates, producer	ABC
2005 (57th)	Dave Chappelle: For What It's Worth	Dave Chappelle, Stan Lathan, Kimber Rickabaugh and Jay Larkin, executive producers	Showtime
2005 (57th)	Everybody Loves Raymond: The Laugh Laugh	Ray Romano, Philip Rosenthal, Stu Smiley, Rory Rosegarten, Lew Schneider, Tucker Cawley, Steve Skrovan, Jeremy Stevens, Mike Royce, Aaron Shure, Mark Herzog and Mark Cowen, executive producers; Tom Caltabiano, Leslie Caveny and Lisa Helfrich, co-executive producers; Jonathan Buss, Holli Gailen and Ken Ornstein, producers	CBS
2005 (57th)	The Games of the XXVIII Olympiad — Opening Ceremony	Dick Ebersol, executive producer; David Neal and Jim Bell, producers	NBC
2006 (58th)
2006 (58th)	The XX Olympic Winter Games - Opening Ceremony	Dick Ebersol, executive producer; David Neal and Molly Solomon, producers	NBC
2006 (58th)	The 78th Annual Academy Awards	Gilbert Cates, producer	ABC
2006 (58th)	Bill Maher: I'm Swiss	Bill Maher and Marc Gurvitz, executive producers; Michael Drumm and Andrea Allen, producers	HBO
2006 (58th)	George Carlin: Life Is Worth Losing	George Carlin and Jerry Hamza, executive producers; Kimber Rickabaugh and Rocco Urbisci, produced by	HBO
2006 (58th)	McCartney in St. Petersburg	Paul McCartney, executive producer; Andrey Boltenko, executive producer, St. Petersburg; Mark Haefeli, producer	A&E
2007 (59th)
2007 (59th)	Tony Bennett: An American Classic	Danny Bennett, John DeLuca and Rob Marshall, executive producers; Jodi Hurwitz, producer	NBC
2007 (59th)	The Comedy Central Roast of William Shatner	Joel Gallen, executive producer; Rick Austin, producer	Comedy Central
2007 (59th)	The Kennedy Center Honors	George Stevens Jr., producer	CBS
2007 (59th)	Lewis Black: Red, White and Screwed	Lewis Black, JoAnne Astrow, Mark Lonow, Kimber Rickabaugh and Paul Miller, executive producers	HBO
2007 (59th)	A Tribute to James Taylor (Great Performances)	John Beug, David Horn, Gary Borman and Barry Schulman, executive producers; Katie Campbell, supervising producers; Rose Granatt, Kristi Harman, Tim Swift and Dana Tomarken, producers	PBS
2007 (59th)	Wanda Sykes: Sick and Tired	Wanda Sykes and Liz Stanton, executive producers; Michael Drumm and Andrea Allen, producers	HBO
2008 (60th)
2008 (60th)	Mr. Warmth: The Don Rickles Project	Mike Richardson, Robert Engelman, Larry Rickles and John Landis, produced by	HBO
2008 (60th)	Bill Maher: The Decider	Bill Maher and Marc Gurvitz, executive producers; Benn Fleishman, supervising producer; Pat Tourk Lee and John Moffitt, produced by	HBO
2008 (60th)	George Carlin: It's Bad for Ya!	George Carlin and Jerry Hamza, executive producers; Kimber Rickabaugh and Rocco Urbisci, produced by	HBO
2008 (60th)	James Taylor: One Man Band (Great Performances)	Sydney Pollack and Michael Gorfaine, executive producers; Don Mischer, producer	PBS
2008 (60th)	Kathy Griffin: Straight to Hell	Sandy Chanley, Kathy Griffin, Cori Abraham, Frances Berwick and Amy Introcaso, executive producers; Tom Bull, supervising producer; Scott Butler and Keith Truesdell, producers	Bravo
2008 (60th)	The Kennedy Center Honors	George Stevens Jr. and Michael Stevens, producers	CBS
2009 (61st)
2009 (61st)	The Kennedy Center Honors	George Stevens Jr. and Michael Stevens, producers	CBS
2009 (61st)	Chris Rock: Kill the Messenger	Chris Rock, executive producer/performer; Marty Callner and Randall Gladstein, produced by	HBO
2009 (61st)	Kathy Griffin: She'll Cut a Bitch	Kathy Griffin, Kimber Rickabaugh, Paul Miller, Cori Abraham, Andy Cohen and Jenn Levy, executive producers	Bravo
2009 (61st)	Ricky Gervais: Out of England - The Stand-Up Special	Ricky Gervais, executive producer/performer; Ben Fleishman, supervising producer; Pat Tourk Lee and John Moffitt, produced by	HBO
2009 (61st)	Will Ferrell: You're Welcome America. A Final Night with George W. Bush	Will Ferrell, executive producer/performer; Adam McKay and Jessica Elbaum, executive producers; Marty Callner and Randall Gladstein, produced by	HBO

=== 2010s ===
Year	Program	Producers	Network
2010 (62nd)
2010 (62nd)	The Kennedy Center Honors	George Stevens Jr. and Michael Stevens, producers	CBS
2010 (62nd)	Bill Maher... But I'm Not Wrong	Bill Maher, executive producer/principal performer; Marc Gurvitz, executive producer; Benn Fleishman, supervising producer; Pat Tourk Lee and John Moffitt, produced by	HBO
2010 (62nd)	Hope for Haiti Now	George Clooney and Joel Gallen, executive producers	(Note: Hope for Haiti Now was simulcast on dozens of television stations across the globe. The Emmys listed no individual network with this nomination.)
2010 (62nd)	Robin Williams: Weapons of Self Destruction	David Steinberg, executive producer; Marty Callner, produced by; Randall Gladstein, Mason Steinberg and Robin Williams, producers	HBO
2010 (62nd)	The 25th Anniversary Rock and Roll Hall of Fame Concert	Jann Wenner, Tom Hanks, Gary Goetzman, Joel Gallen and Joel Peresman, executive producers	HBO
2010 (62nd)	Wanda Sykes: I'ma Be Me	Wanda Sykes, executive producer/performer; Liz Stanton, executive producer	HBO
2011 (63rd)
2011 (63rd)	The Kennedy Center Honors	George Stevens Jr. and Michael Stevens, producers	CBS
2011 (63rd)	Bette Midler: The Showgirl Must Go On	Bette Midler, executive producer/produced by/performer; Seanne Farmer, produced by	HBO
2011 (63rd)	Carrie Fisher in Wishful Drinking	Sheila Nevins, executive producer; Carrie Fisher, performer; Fenton Bailey and Randy Barbato, produced by	HBO
2011 (63rd)	Lady Gaga Presents the Monster Ball Tour: At Madison Square Garden	Lady Gaga, executive producer/performer; Troy Carter, Vincent Herbert, Jimmy Iovine and Mo Morrison, executive producers	HBO
2011 (63rd)	The Pee-wee Herman Show on Broadway	Paul Reubens, executive producer/performer; Bonnie Werth and Kelly Bush Novak, executive producers; Marty Callner and Randall Gladstein, produced by	HBO

Outstanding Variety Special

Year	Program	Producers	Network
2012 (64th)
2012 (64th)	The Kennedy Center Honors	George Stevens Jr. and Michael Stevens, producers	CBS
2012 (64th)	Betty White's 90th Birthday: A Tribute to America's Golden Girl	Brad Lachman, Jon Macks and Steve Ridgeway, executive producers; Bill Bracken, producer	NBC
2012 (64th)	Kathy Griffin: Tired Hooker	Kathy Griffin, Kimber Rickabaugh, Paul Miller, Andy Cohen and Jenn Levy, executive producers	Bravo
2012 (64th)	Mel Brooks and Dick Cavett Together Again	Andrea Grossman, executive producer; Steve Haberman and Rudy De Luca, producers; Mel Brooks and Dick Cavett, performers	HBO
2012 (64th)	Tony Bennett: Duets II (Great Performances)	Danny Bennett, executive producer; David Horn, executive producer for Great Performances; Jennifer Lebeau, producer; Tony Bennett, principal performer	PBS
2013 (65th)
2013 (65th)	The Kennedy Center Honors	George Stevens Jr. and Michael Stevens, producers	CBS
2013 (65th)	Louis C.K.: Oh My God	Louis C.K., executive producer/performer; Blair Breard, Dave Becky and Mike Berkowitz, executive producers	HBO
2013 (65th)	Mel Brooks Strikes Back! with Mel Brooks and Alan Yentob	Mel Brooks, executive producer; Steve Haberman and Rudy De Luca, produced by	HBO
2013 (65th)	Saturday Night Live Weekend Update Thursday (Part One)	Lorne Michaels, executive producer; Ken Aymong, supervising producer; Lindsay Shookus, Erin Doyle, Steve Higgins, Erik Kenward and Alex Baze, producers	NBC
2013 (65th)	12-12-12: The Concert for Sandy Relief	James L. Dolan, Harvey Weinstein and John Sykes, executive producers; Michael Dempsey and Dan Parise, producers	(Note: 12-12-12: The Concert for Sandy Relief was simulcast live on 39 U.S. television stations and more than 25 websites. The Emmys listed no individual network with this nomination.)
2014 (66th)
2014 (66th)	AFI Life Achievement Award: A Tribute to Mel Brooks	Bob Gazzale, executive producer; Cort Casady, supervising producer; Chris Merrill, producer; Martin Short, performer/host	TNT
2014 (66th)	Billy Crystal: 700 Sundays	Billy Crystal, executive producer/performer; Janice Crystal, Larry Magid and David Steinberg, executive producers; Des McAnuff and Alan Zweibel, co-executive producers; Benn Fleishman, supervising producer	HBO
2014 (66th)	Best of Late Night with Jimmy Fallon Primetime Special	Lorne Michaels, executive producer; Rob Crabbe and Jim Juvonen, supervising producers; Gavin Purcell, producer; Josh Lieb, produced by; Jimmy Fallon, host	NBC
2014 (66th)	The Kennedy Center Honors	George Stevens Jr. and Michael Stevens, produced by	CBS
2014 (66th)	The Night That Changed America: A Grammy Salute to The Beatles	Ken Elrich and R.A. Clark, executive producers; Renato Basile, producer	CBS
2014 (66th)	Sarah Silverman: We Are Miracles	Sarah Silverman, executive producer/performer; Heidi Herzon, Mike Farah, Anna Wenger, Betsy Koch and Amy Zvi, executive producers; Stephanie Meurer, producer	HBO
2015 (67th)
2015 (67th)	Saturday Night Live 40th Anniversary Special	Lorne Michaels, executive producer; Ken Aymong, supervising producer; Lindsay Shookus, Erin Doyle and Rhys Thomas, producers; Steve Higgins and Erik Kenward, produced by	NBC
2015 (67th)	Bill Maher: Live from D.C.	Bill Maher, executive producer/performer; Marc Gurvitz and Troy Miller, executive producers; Benn Fleishman, supervising producer	HBO
2015 (67th)	The Kennedy Center Honors	Bill Urban, Danette Herman and Sara Lukinson, co-executive producers; George Stevens Jr. and Michael Stevens, produced by	CBS
2015 (67th)	Louis C.K.: Live at the Comedy Store	Louis C.K., Blair Breard, Dave Becky and Mike Berkowitz, executive producers; John Skidmore, produced by	LouisCK.net
2015 (67th)	Mel Brooks: Live at the Geffen	Mel Brooks, executive producer/performer; Kevin Salter, Steve Haberman and Rudy De Luca, producers	HBO
2015 (67th)	Tony Bennett and Lady Gaga: Cheek to Cheek Live!	Tony Bennett, Lady Gaga, David Horn, Danny Bennett and Bobby Campbell, executive producers; Mitch Owgang, producer	PBS
2016 (68th)
2016 (68th)	The Late Late Show Carpool Karaoke Primetime Special	Rob Crabbe and Ben Winston, executive producers; Mike Gibbons, co-executive producer; Sheila Rogers, Michael Kaplan, Jeff Kopp and Josie Cliff, supervising producers; James Corden, producer/host	CBS
2016 (68th)	Adele: Live in New York City	Lorne Michaels, Adele and Jonathan Dickins, executive producers; Paul Chagares and Ken Aymong, supervising producers; Lindsay Shookus and Erik Kenward, producers; Matt Roberts, Erin David and Rhys Thomas, produced by	NBC
2016 (68th)	Amy Schumer: Live at the Apollo	Amy Schumer, executive producer/performer; Jimmy Miller, Mike Berkowitz, Tony Hernandez and Steven Ast, executive producers; Kim Caramele and Kevin Kane, producers; John Skidmore, produced by	HBO
2016 (68th)	The Kennedy Center Honors	Ricky Kirshner and Glenn Weiss, executive producers; Robert Paine, supervising producer; Stephen Colbert, host	CBS
2016 (68th)	Lemonade	Beyoncé Knowles Carter, executive producer/performer; Todd Tourso, Erinn Williams, Dora Melissa Vargas, Steve Pamon and Ed Burke, executive producers	HBO
2017 (69th)
2017 (69th)	Carpool Karaoke Primetime Special 2017	Ben Winston and Rob Crabbe, executive producers; Amy Ozols, co-executive producer; Josie Cliff, Sheila Rogers, Michael Kaplan, James Longman, and Jeff Kopp, supervising producers; James Corden, producer/host; Diana Miller, producer	CBS
2017 (69th)	Full Frontal with Samantha Bee Presents Not the White House Correspondents' Dinner	Samantha Bee, executive producer/host; Jo Miller, Jason Jones, Tony Hernandez, and Miles Kahn, executive producers; Alison Camillo, co-executive producer; Pat King, supervising producer; Kristen Everman, produced by	TBS
2017 (69th)	Louis C.K. 2017	Louis C.K., executive producer/performer; Dave Becky, Mike Berkowitz, and Tony Hernandez, executive producers; Ryan Cunningham, producer; John Skidmore, produced by	Netflix
2017 (69th)	Sarah Silverman: A Speck of Dust	Sarah Silverman, executive producer/performer; Amy Zvi, Nicholas Veneroso, and Daniel Kellison, executive producers; Mickey Meyer, co-executive producer	Netflix
2017 (69th)	Stephen Colbert's Live Election Night Democracy's Series Finale: Who's Going to Clean Up This Sh*t?	Stephen Colbert, executive producer/host; Chris Licht, Tom Purcell, and Jon Stewart, executive producers; Barry Julien, co-executive producer; Denise Rehrig, senior supervising producer; Tanya Michnevich Bracco, Paul Dinello, Matt Lappin, Liz Levin, Opus Moreschi, Emily Gertler, Aaron Cohen, supervising producers; Paige Kendig, producer	Showtime

Outstanding Variety Special (Pre-Recorded)

Year	Program	Producers	Network
2018 (70th)
2018 (70th)	Dave Chappelle: Equanimity	Dave Chappelle and Stan Lathan, executive producers; Rikki Hughes, supervising producer	Netflix
2018 (70th)	The Carol Burnett Show: 50th Anniversary Special	Carol Burnett, executive producer/host; Steve Sauer, Allen Shapiro, Mike Mahan, Mark Bracco, Paul Miller and Leslie Kolins Small, executive producers; Ben Roy, co-executive producer; Linda Gierahn, supervising producer	CBS
2018 (70th)	Carpool Karaoke Primetime Special 2018	Ben Winston and Rob Crabbe, executive producers; Josie Cliff, Sheila Rogers, Michael Kaplan, James Longman, Matt Roberts and Jeff Kopp, supervising producers; James Corden, producer/host; Diana Miller, producer	CBS
2018 (70th)	Full Frontal with Samantha Bee Presents: The Great American* Puerto Rico (*It's Complicated)	Samantha Bee, executive producer/host; Jason Jones, Tony Hernandez, Miles Kahn, Alison Camillo and Pat King, executive producers; Kim Burdges, Allana Harkin, Chris Savage and Melinda Taub, producers	TBS
2018 (70th)	Steve Martin & Martin Short: An Evening You Will Forget for the Rest of Your Life	Lorne Michaels, Steve Martin, Martin Short, Marc Gurvitz and Erin David, executive producers; Marcus Raboy, producer; Neal Marshall, produced by	Netflix
2019 (71st)
2019 (71st)	Carpool Karaoke: When Corden Met McCartney Live from Liverpool	Ben Winston and Rob Crabbe, executive producers; James Longman, co-executive producer; Josie Cliff, Sheila Rogers, Jeff Kopp and Carly Shackleton, supervising producers; James Corden, Lou Fox, Lauren Greenberg, Ian Karmel, Diana Miller, Benjamin Riad and Gabe Turner, producers	CBS
2019 (71st)	Hannah Gadsby: Nanette	Kevin Whyte and Kathleen McCarthy, executive producers; Frank Bruzzese, producer; Hannah Gadsby, performer	Netflix
2019 (71st)	Homecoming: A Film by Beyoncé	Beyoncé Knowles-Carter, executive producer/performer; Steve Pamon, Erinn Williams and Ed Burke, executive producers	Netflix
2019 (71st)	Springsteen on Broadway	Bruce Springsteen, executive producer/performer; Jon Landau, George Travis and Thom Zimny, producers	Netflix
2019 (71st)	Wanda Sykes: Not Normal	Wanda Sykes, executive producer/performer; Page Hurwitz, executive producer	Netflix

=== 2020s ===
Year	Program	Producers	Network
2020 (72nd)
2020 (72nd)	Dave Chappelle: Sticks & Stones	Dave Chappelle, executive producer/performer; Stan Lathan, executive producer; Rikki Hughes, co-executive producer; Sina Sadighi, producer	Netflix
2020 (72nd)	Dave Chappelle: The Kennedy Center Mark Twain Prize for American Humor	Rick Austin, Dalton Delan, David Jammy and Deborah F. Rutter, executive producers; Chris Robinson, Michael B. Matuza and Matthew Winer, producers	PBS
2020 (72nd)	Hannah Gadsby: Douglas	Hannah Gadsby, executive producer/performer; Kevin Whyte, Kathleen McCarthy and John Irwin, executive producers; Casey Spira, co-executive producer; Jenney Shamash, producer	Netflix
2020 (72nd)	Jerry Seinfeld: 23 Hours to Kill	Jerry Seinfeld, executive producer/performer; George Shapiro, Tammy Johnston and Michael Davies, executive producers; Denis Jensen and Melissa Miller, producers	Netflix
2020 (72nd)	John Mulaney & the Sack Lunch Bunch	John Mulaney, executive producer/performer; Marika Sawyer, Rhys Thomas, David Miner, Cara Masline, Ravi Nandan and Inman Young, executive producers; Dave Ferguson, supervising producer; Corey Deckler, Mary Beth Minthorn and Kerri Hundley, producers	Netflix
2020 (72nd)	Tiffany Haddish: Black Mitzvah	Tiffany Haddish, executive producer/performer; Page Hurwitz and Wanda Sykes, executive producers	Netflix
2021 (73rd)
2021 (73rd)	Hamilton	Sander Jacobs, Jill Furman and Maggie Brohn, executive producers; Jon Kamen, Dave Sirulnick and Justin Wilkes, co-executive producers; Thomas Kail, Lin-Manuel Miranda and Jeffrey Seller, produced by	Disney+
2021 (73rd)	Bo Burnham: Inside	Bo Burnham, executive producer/performer; Josh Senior, producer	Netflix
2021 (73rd)	David Byrne's American Utopia	Jeff Skoll, David Linde, Diane Weyermann, Len Blavatnik, David Bither, Charlie Cohen, Kurt Deutsch, Bill Pohlad, Christa Zofcin Workman, Jon Kamen, Dave Sirulnick, Meredith Bennett, Kristin Caskey, Mike Isaacson and Patrick Catullo, executive producers; Sue Naegle, co-executive producer; Alec Sash, supervising producer; David Byrne, produced by/performer; Spike Lee, produced by	HBO
2021 (73rd)	8:46 - Dave Chappelle	Dave Chappelle, produced by/performer; Julia Reichert, Sina Sadighi and Steven Bognar, produced by	Netflix
2021 (73rd)	Friends: The Reunion	Ben Winston, Kevin S. Bright, Marta Kauffman, David Crane, Jennifer Aniston, Courteney Cox, Lisa Kudrow, Matt LeBlanc, Matthew Perry and David Schwimmer, executive producers; Emma Conway, James Longman and Stacey Thomas-Muir, co-executive producers; Brett Blakeney, supervising producer; James Corden, producer/host; Dave Piendak, Carly Robyn Segal, Guy Harding, Paul Monaghan, Tracie Fiss, Mike Darnell and Brooke Karzen, producers	HBO Max
2021 (73rd)	A West Wing Special to Benefit When We All Vote	Casey Patterson, Thomas Schlamme and Aaron Sorkin, executive producers; Rob Paine, co-executive producer; Brittany Mehmedovic, producer	HBO Max
2022 (74th)
2022 (74th)	Adele: One Night Only	Ben Winston, Adele Adkins, Jonathan Dickins, Raj Kapoor, Tara Montgomery and Terry Wood, executive producers; Rob Paine, co-executive producer	CBS
2022 (74th)	Dave Chappelle: The Closer	Dave Chappelle, executive producer/performer; Rikki Hughes and Stan Lathan, executive producers; Sina Sadighi, producer	Netflix
2022 (74th)	Harry Potter 20th Anniversary: Return to Hogwarts	Casey Patterson, Carol Donovan, Ashley Edens, Marissa Clifford, Louis Mole, Sam Bridger, Isabel Davis and David Heyman, executive producers; Rob Paine, co-executive producer; Chase Simonds, supervising producer; Mike Darnell, Brooke Karzen and Dan Sacks, producers	HBO Max
2022 (74th)	Norm Macdonald: Nothing Special	Norm Macdonald, Lori Jo Hoekstra, Marc Gurvitz and John Irwin, executive producers; Casey Spira, co-executive producer	Netflix
2022 (74th)	One Last Time: An Evening with Tony Bennett and Lady Gaga	Alex Coletti, Bruce Gillmer, Jack Sussman, Danny Bennett and Bobby Campbell, executive producers; Gillian Appleby, supervising producer; Allison Roithinger, produced by; Chris Vineyard and Jennifer Lebeau, producers; Lady Gaga and Tony Bennett, hosts	CBS
2023 (75th)
2023 (75th)	Carol Burnett: 90 Years of Laughter + Love	Carol Burnett, Brian Miller, Steve Sauer, Baz Halpin, Mark Bracco, Linda Gierahn and Paul Miller, executive producers; Theresa Moore King, supervising producer; Jenessa Salcedo, line producer	NBC
2023 (75th)	John Mulaney: Baby J	John Mulaney, executive producer/performer; Alex Timbers, executive producer; John Foy, co-executive producer; Jim Jagels, line producer	Netflix
2023 (75th)	Lizzo: Live in Concert	Lizzo, executive producer/performer; Kevin Beisler, Ian Stewart, Leah Harper-Lane and Hamish Hamilton, executive producers; Alana Balden, producer; Justin Grider, line producer	HBO Max
2023 (75th)	Norman Lear: 100 Years of Music and Laughter	David Jammy, Brent Miller, Garrett English and Raj Kapoor, executive producers; Grace Stevens, Tara West Margolis, Eric Cook and James Merryman, co-executive producers; Kate Johnston, Carly Robyn Segal and Augie Max Vargas, producers; Karen Scarminach, line producer	ABC
2023 (75th)	Trevor Noah: I Wish You Would	Trevor Noah, executive producer/performer; Sanaz Yamin, Bob Bain, Norman Aladjem and Derek Van Pelt, executive producers; Benn Fleishman, supervising producer; Danny Sanchez, line producer	Netflix
2023 (75th)	Wanda Sykes: I'm an Entertainer	Wanda Sykes, executive producer/performer; Page Hurwitz, executive producer; Kerri Hundley, produced by	Netflix
2024 (76th)
2024 (76th)	Dick Van Dyke 98 Years of Magic	Craig Plestis, Chris Wagner, Clara Plestis, Ashley Edens, Deena Katz and Arlene Van Dyke, executive producers; Stephanie Wagner, supervising producer; Brittany Cherry and Ariel Kubit, producers; Chelsea Gonnering, line producer	CBS
2024 (76th)	Billy Joel: The 100th — Live at Madison Square Garden	Billy Joel, executive producer/performer; Steve Cohen, Barry Ehrmann and Paul Dugdale, executive producers; Brian Ruggles and Bobby Thrasher, co-executive producers; Ned Doyle, supervising producer; Leslie Vincent and Krystle Tesoriero, producers	CBS
2024 (76th)	Dave Chappelle: The Dreamer	Dave Chappelle, executive producer/performer; Rikki Hughes and Stan Lathan, executive producers; Sina Sadighi, producer	Netflix
2024 (76th)	Nikki Glaser: Someday You'll Die	Nikki Glaser, executive producer/performer; Chris Convy, David Jammy and Alex Murray, executive producers; Bill Urban, co-executive producer; Chris McQueen, producer	HBO
2024 (76th)	Trevor Noah: Where Was I	Trevor Noah, executive producer/performer; Sanaz Yamin, Bob Bain, Norman Aladjem and Derek Van Pelt, executive producers; Benn Fleishman, supervising producer; Danny Sanchez, line producer; David Paul Meyer, produced by	Netflix
2025 (77th)
2025 (77th)	Conan O'Brien: The Kennedy Center Mark Twain Prize for American Humor	David Jammy, Chris Convy, Kristen Wong, Rick Austin, Matthew Winer and Monica Holt, executive producers; Bill Urban and Michael B. Matuza, co-executive producers; Samantha Sullivan, supervising producer; Marcus Raboy, Phil Rosenberg, Robin Burke, Neha Patel and Emeline Carlisle, producers; Andrew Schaff, line producer	Netflix
2025 (77th)	Adam Sandler: Love You	Barry Bernardi, Robert Digby and John Irwin, executive producers; Kathy Welch, line producer; Josh Safdie, Ronald Bronstein, Eli Bush, Dan Bulla, Carter Hambley, Brian Robinson, Joseph Vecsey, Judit Maull, Eli Thomas and Perry Sachs, produced by; Adam Sandler, produced by/performer	Netflix
2025 (77th)	Ali Wong: Single Lady	Ali Wong, executive producer/performer; John Irwin, executive producer; Casey Spira, co-executive producer; Ryan Polito, producer	Netflix
2025 (77th)	Bill Burr: Drop Dead Years	Bill Burr, executive producer/performer; Mike Bertolina, Dave Becky and Ben Tishler, executive producers; Matt Schuler and Cameron Fife, produced by	Hulu
2025 (77th)	Sarah Silverman: PostMortem	Sarah Silverman, executive producer/performer; Amy Zvi and John Skidmore, executive producers	Netflix
2025 (77th)	Your Friend, Nate Bargatze	Nate Bargatze, executive producer/performer; Alex Murray, Tim Sarkes and John Irwin, executive producers; Kathy Welch, producer	Netflix
2026 (78th)
2026 (78th)	The Muppet Show	David Lightbody, Leigh Slaughter, Michael Steinbach, Seth Rogen, Evan Goldberg, James Weaver, Alex McAtee, Matt Vogel, Eric Jacobson, Albertina Rizzo and Alex Timbers, executive producers; Sabrina Carpenter, executive producer/performer; Ryan Janata, co-executive producer; Dani Iglesias, producer	Disney+
2026 (78th)	Dave Chappelle: The Unstoppable...	Dave Chappelle, executive producer/performer; Rikki Hughes, executive producer; Sina Sadighi, producer	Netflix
2026 (78th)	Nikki Glaser: Good Girl	Nikki Glaser, executive producer/performer; David Jammy, Chris Convy, Hamish Hamilton and Alex Murray, executive producers; Samantha Sullivan, supervising producer; Renee Pyne, Brian Frange, Sean O'Connor and Phil Rosenberg, producers; Justin Grider, line producer	Hulu
2026 (78th)	Taylor Swift | The Eras Tour | The Final Show	Baz Halpin, Mark Bracco and Linda Gierahn, executive producers; Rose-Ellen Galluzzo, supervising producer; Taylor Swift, produced by/performer; Bradley Stein, line producer	Disney+
2026 (78th)	Wicked: One Wonderful Night	Ben Winston and Raj Kapoor, executive producers; Paul Dugdale, Lou Fox, Patrick Menton and Rob Paine, co-executive producers; Bex Hampson, supervising producer; Christopher Scott, Siena Castillo, Rita Maye-Bland and Dave Piendak, producers; Chelsea Gonnering and Penny Le Vesconte, line producers; Ariana Grande and Cynthia Erivo, principal performers/hosts	NBC
