= American Theater Hall of Fame =

Hall of fame in New York City

Coordinates: 40.7622°N 73.98450°W

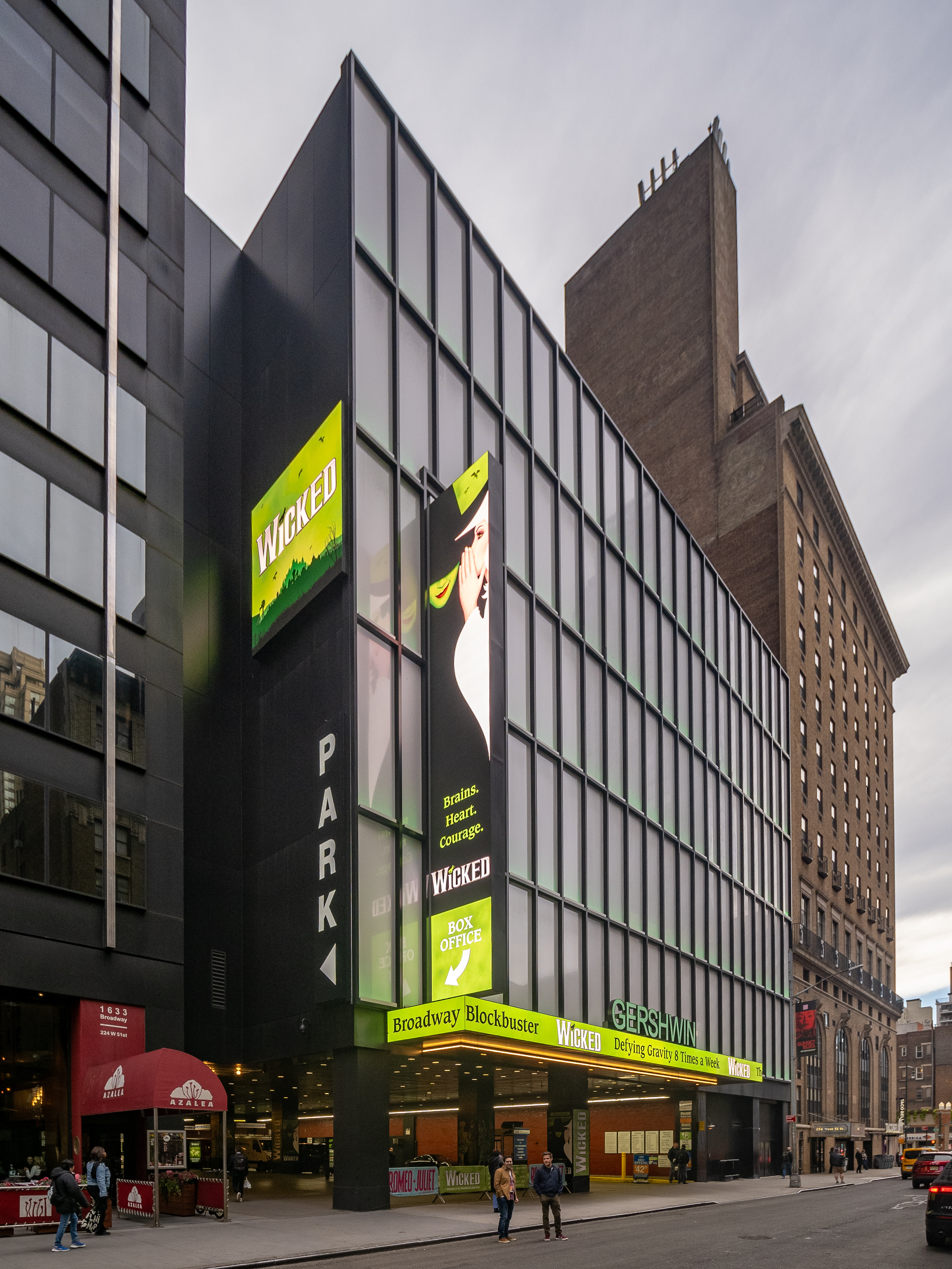
The American Theater Hall of Fame is located at the Gershwin Theatre in New York City.

The American Theater Hall of Fame was founded in 1971 in New York City. The first head of its executive committee was Earl Blackwell. In an announcement in 1972, he said that the new Theater Hall of Fame would be located in the Uris Theatre (now the Gershwin Theatre), which was then under construction. James M. Nederlander and Gerard Oestreicher, who leased the theater, donated the space for the Hall of Fame; Arnold Weissberger was another founder. Blackwell ordered that the names of the first honorees "be embossed in bronze-gold lettering on the theater's entrance walls flanking its grand staircase and escalator".

The first members elected to the Theater Hall of Fame were George Abbott, Maxwell Anderson, Brooks Atkinson, Norman Bel Geddes, Marie Dressler, Jeanne Eagels, Clyde Fitch, Rudolf Friml, Moss Hart, Arthur Hopkins, Walter Huston, George S. Kaufman, Bert Lahr, Ethel Merman, Ferenc Molnár, Clifford Odets, Lillian Russell, Robert E. Sherwood, Lee and J. J. Shubert, Orson Welles, Thornton Wilder and P. G. Wodehouse.

Eligible inductees come from disciplines including actors, playwrights, songwriters, designers, directors, and producers who have had a career in American theater for at least 25 years and at least five major production credits on Broadway. Selections are made each year by voting members of the Theater Hall of Fame and the American Theatre Critics Association (ATCA). Induction takes place at a ceremony at the Gershwin Theatre in New York City, where the plaques containing the names of the inductees are hung.

No names were inducted between 1974 and 1979 due to a lack of funds. Since 1998, full accounts of the annual induction ceremonies, with quotes from both inductees and their presenters, have appeared in the Pittsburgh Post-Gazette. An index to these articles is on the ATCA website. An annual Theater Hall of Fame Fellowship Luncheon has been held annually since 2004 to salute a member "who continues to work on Broadway and also presents grants to emerging theatre artists".

== Inductees ==
- George Abbott
- F. Murray Abraham
- Maude Adams
- Stella Adler
- Edward Albee
- Robert Alda
- Judith Anderson
- Julie Andrews
- Harold Arlen
- Adele Astaire
- Fred Astaire
- Rene Auberjonois
- Lauren Bacall
- Pearl Bailey
- Anne Bancroft
- Tallulah Bankhead
- Christine Baranski
- Ethel Barrymore
- John Barrymore
- Lionel Barrymore
- Mikhail Baryshnikov
- Norman Bel Geddes
- Michael Bennett
- Ingrid Bergman
- Busby Berkeley
- Irving Berlin
- Sarah Bernhardt
- Leonard Bernstein
- Joan Blondell
- Ray Bolger
- Edwin Booth
- Shirley Booth
- Matthew Broderick
- Betty Buckley
- Billie Burke
- Carol Burnett
- Ellen Burstyn
- Richard Burton
- James Cagney
- Eddie Cantor
- Kitty Carlisle
- Gower Champion
- Carol Channing
- Stockard Channing
- Kristin Chenoweth
- Glenn Close
- Lee J. Cobb
- George M. Cohan
- Jack Cole
- Betty Comden
- Barbara Cook
- Katharine Cornell
- Noël Coward
- Hume Cronyn
- John Cullum
- Jim Dale
- Tyne Daly
- Bette Davis
- Ossie Davis
- Sammy Davis Jr.
- Agnes de Mille
- Andre De Shields
- Ruby Dee
- Brian Dennehy
- Colleen Dewhurst
- Melvyn Douglas
- Alfred Drake
- Marie Dressler
- Faye Dunaway
- Eleanora Duse
- Jeanne Eagels
- Fred Ebb
- Maurice Evans
- Jose Ferrer
- Dorothy Fields
- W.C. Fields
- Harvey Fierstein
- Henry Fonda
- Lynn Fontanne
- Edwin Forrest
- Bob Fosse
- Peter Gallagher
- Eva Le Gallienne
- Peter Gennaro
- George Gershwin
- Ira Gershwin
- John Gielgud
- Charles Gilpin
- Lillian Gish
- Ruth Gordon
- Adolph Green
- Joel Grey
- Tammy Grimes
- Uta Hagen
- Marvin Hamlisch
- Oscar Hammerstein II
- Lorraine Hansberry
- Jed Harris
- Julie Harris
- Edward Harrigan
- Rex Harrison
- Lorenz Hart
- Moss Hart
- Tony Hart
- June Havoc
- Helen Hayes
- Lillian Hellman
- Katharine Hepburn
- Jerry Herman
- Gregory Hines
- Dustin Hoffman
- Hal Holbrook
- Jennifer Holliday
- Judy Holliday
- Celeste Holm
- Lena Horne
- John Houseman
- Leslie Howard
- William Inge
- Derek Jacobi
- Joseph Jefferson
- Al Jolson
- Cherry Jones
- James Earl Jones
- Tom Jones
- Raul Julia
- Madeline Kahn
- John Kander
- Garson Kanin
- George S. Kaufman
- Danny Kaye
- Stubby Kaye
- Elia Kazan
- Howard Keel
- Ruby Keeler
- Gene Kelly
- Jerome Kern
- Michael Kidd
- Richard Kiley
- Kevin Kline
- Bert Lahr
- Nathan Lane
- Angela Lansbury
- Arthur Laurents
- Linda Lavin
- Gertrude Lawrence
- Canada Lee
- Lotte Lenya
- Alan Jay Lerner
- Sam Levene
- Beatrice Lillie
- John Lithgow
- Frank Loesser
- Frederick Loewe
- Joshua Logan
- Dorothy Loudon
- Alfred Lunt
- Patti LuPone
- Cameron Mackintosh
- Joe Mantello
- Fredric March
- Elliot Martin
- Mary Martin
- Marin Mazzie
- Audra McDonald
- Donna McKechnie
- Ian McKellen
- Terrence McNally
- Sanford Meisner
- Burgess Meredith
- Ethel Merman
- David Merrick
- Laurie Metcalf
- Ann Miller
- Arthur Miller
- Marilyn Miller
- Liza Minnelli
- Brian Stokes Mitchell
- Rita Moreno
- Robert Morse
- Zero Mostel
- Paul Muni
- George Jean Nathan
- Patricia Neal
- Bebe Neuwirth
- Mike Nichols
- Eugene O'Neill
- Clifford Odets
- Laurence Olivier
- Jerry Orbach
- Geraldine Page
- Mandy Patinkin
- Bernadette Peters
- Molly Picon
- Christopher Plummer
- Cole Porter
- Robert Preston
- Faith Prince
- Harold Prince
- John Raitt
- Tony Randall
- Phylicia Rashad
- Lynn Redgrave
- Michael Redgrave
- Vanessa Redgrave
- Ann Reinking
- Debbie Reynolds
- Tim Rice
- Ralph Richardson
- Chita Rivera
- Jason Robards
- Jerome Robbins
- Paul Robeson
- Bill Robinson
- Richard Rodgers
- Ginger Rogers
- Will Rogers
- Lillian Russell
- Rosalind Russell
- William Saroyan
- Stephen Schwartz
- Vivienne Segal
- Marian Seldes
- Sam Shepard
- Neil Simon
- Otis Skinner
- Alexis Smith
- Stephen Sondheim
- Kim Stanley
- James Stewart
- Patrick Stewart
- Fred Stone
- Lee Strasberg
- Elaine Stritch
- Charles Strouse
- Margaret Sullavan
- Jessica Tandy
- Laurette Taylor
- Julie Taymor
- Spencer Tracy
- Sophie Tucker
- Cicely Tyson
- Leslie Uggams
- Gwen Verdon
- Ben Vereen
- Eli Wallach
- Ethel Waters
- Clifton Webb
- Andrew Lloyd Webber
- Kurt Weill
- Orson Welles
- Mae West
- Thornton Wilder
- Bert Williams
- Tennessee Williams
- August Wilson
- Shelley Winters
- P.G. Wodehouse
- Joanne Woodward
- Irene Worth
- Ed Wynn
- Maury Yeston
- Florenz Ziegfeld Jr.

== Founders Award ==
An annual Theater Hall of Fame Founders Award, established in 1993 in honor of the three founders, recognizes an individual's outstanding contribution to the theatre.

Recipients:

- 1993 James Nederlander
- 1994 Kitty Carlisle Hart
- 1995 Harvey Sabinson
- 1996 Henry Hewes
- 1997 Otis L. Guernsey Jr.
- 1998 Edward Colton
- 1999 (No award)
- 2000 Gerard Oestreicher
- 2000 Arnold Weissberger
- 2001 Tom Dillon
- 2002 (No award)
- 2003 Price Berkley
- 2004 (No award)
- 2005 Donald Seawell
- 2007 Roy A. Somlyo
- 2008 Shirley Herz
