= Sick and Tired =

Sick and Tired may refer to:

== Film and TV ==
- Sick and Tired (2006), a stand-up comedy show by Wanda Sykes

== Music ==
=== "Sick and Tired" ===
- "Sick and Tired" (Anastacia song), a song by Anastacia from her 2004 album Anastacia
- "Sick and Tired" (Iann Dior song), 2020
- "Sick and Tired", 1957, covered and made into a hit by Fats Domino in 1958
- "Sick and Tired", a song by Waylon Jennings from his 1970 album Singer of Sad Songs
- "Sick and Tired", a song by Toronto from their 1982 album Get It on Credit
- "Sick and Tired", a song by Everclear from their 1993 album World of Noise
- "Sick and Tired", a song by Black Sabbath from their 1995 album Forbidden
- "Sick and Tired", a song by Cross Canadian Ragweed from their 2004 album Soul Gravy
- "Sick and Tired", a song by Monica on the 2005 Diary of a Mad Black Woman soundtrack

=== "Sick & Tired" ===
- "Sick & Tired" (The Cardigans song), a song by the Cardigans from their 1994 album Emmerdale
- "Sick & Tired", a song by Johnny Winter from his 1976 album Together: Edgar Winter And Johnny Winter Live
- "Sick & Tired", a song by Eric Clapton from his 1998 album Pilgrim
- "Sick & Tired", a song by Default from their 2001 album The Fallout
- "Sick & Tired", a song by Nappy Roots from their 2003 album Wooden Leather
- "Sick & Tired", a song by Denzel Curry from his 2016 album Imperial

=== "Sick 'N' Tired" ===
- "Sick 'N' Tired" a 1964 song by Billy Thorpe and the Aztecs
- "Sick 'N' Tired", a song by Ms. Dynamite from her 2002 album A Little Deeper

=== Other ===
- "Candle (Sick and Tired)", a 2008 song by the White Tie Affair
