= John Irwin (producer) =

American television producer, president of Irwin Entertainment

John Irwin is an American television producer and entertainment executive.

== Career ==
Irwin has primarily worked in late night and reality television. His career began in 1993 as a producer for Late Night with Conan O'Brien. In 1997 he transitioned to Fox Television where he served as a producer for Mad TV. He then served as Vice President of Development and Production for Lorne Michaels's Broadway Video for five years.

Irwin returned to producing as the Executive Producer for seven seasons on the VH1 series Celebrity Rehab with Dr. Drew. From 2012 to 2015 he served as the Executive Producer of Couples Therapy for VH1.

In 2004, Irwin founded Irwin Entertainment, Inc., a film production company focused on developing comedy, reality, scripted and live entertainment programming

== Select filmography ==
=== Film / documentary ===
Title	Year	Credit	Notes
The Best of the Blues Brothers	1993	associate producer	
David Cross: Let America Laugh	2003	producer - segment "New York Office"	
The MidNightly News	2005	executive producer	
Pete Davidson Presents: The Best Friends	2022	executive producer	

=== Television ===
Title	Year	Credit	Notes
Late Night with Conan O'Brien	1993-1996	producer - 60 episodes, line producer - 2 episodes, 1996, associate producer - 2 episodes, 1995 - 1996	
Mad TV	1997-1999	producer, 50 episodes	
Macy's 4th of July Fireworks Spectacular	2000	producer	
The Colin Quinn Show	2002	producer, 3 episodes	
Countdown to the Emmys	2002	executive producer	
Night of Too Many Stars	2003	supervising producer	
Russell Simmons Presents Brave New Voices	2009	executive producer - 7 episodes	
Sex Rehab with Dr. Drew	2009	executive producer - 8 episodes	
Sober House	2009-2010	executive producer - 16 episodes, 2009 - 2010, associate producer - 1 episode, 2010	
Kevin Hart: Serve and Protect	2014	executive producer	
David Spade: My Fake Problems	2014	executive producer	
Tracy Morgan: Bona Fide	2014	executive producer	
Make or Break: The Linda Perry Project	2014	executive producer - 8 episodes	
Couples Therapy with Dr. Jenn	2014	executive producer	
Artie Lange: The Stench of Failure	2014	executive producer	
NBC's New Year's Eve with Carson Daly	2014	executive producer	
Trevor Moore: High in Church	2015	executive producer	
The Illusionists	2015	executive producer	
Couples Therapy	2012-2015	executive producer - 51 episodes	
The Robert Irvine Show	2015-2017	executive producer - 138 episodes	
Legal	2016	creator - 2 episodes	
Michelle Wolf: Nice Lady	2017	executive producer	
The Red Nose Day Special	2018	executive producer	
Pet Stars	2021	executive producer - 5 episodes	
Immoral Compass	2021	executive producer - 10 episodes	
Dancing with Myself (TV series)	2022	executive producer - 8 episodes	
