= Sue Murphy =

American stand-up comedian

- Occupation(s): Stand-up comedian, writer, producer

Sue Murphy is an American stand-up comedian who has worked on such shows as Short Attention Span Theater, The Jeff Foxworthy Show, Comedy Central Presents and Wanda Does It. She is also a producer and writer on The Ellen DeGeneres Show, The Class and Wanda at Large and appeared in the movie Nine Months. In 2001, she was honored with a nomination for the American Comedy Award for Best Female Stand-up.

She is an executive producer of Chelsea Lately, and appeared on camera at the end of the episode that was broadcast on 14 December 2012. In 2016, Murphy performed at a fundraiser for presidential candidate Hillary Clinton. She is an executive producer on Chelsea, Chelsea Handler's talk show on Netflix.
