= Tongue Untied =

Television special

Tongue Untied is a stand-up comedy special written and performed by actress and comedian Wanda Sykes. The show premiered on July 22, 2003 on Comedy Central and was the seventh episode in season one of Comedy Central Stand-Up Specials. It is directed by Paul Miller and was filmed in front of a live audience at the Palace Theater in Albany, NY. According to Linda Mizejewski, a Women, Gender and Sexuality Studies professor at Ohio State University in her book, Pretty/Funny: Women Comedians and Body Politics, the title of the special refers to Tongues Untied, a documentary by Marlon Riggs released in 1989.

== Plot ==
Sykes begins her special by talking about sources of frustration, beginning with bad ideas for TV shows and ending with airport security. Talking about airports segues into a discussion of President Bush and 9/11 culminating in Sykes’ observation that President Bush has done everything she expected him to do. She says, “The economy is in the toilet, we’re at war and everything is on fire." Sykes continues with her critical tone firing off a barrage of jokes at the expense of the American government, the state of New Jersey, and the stock market. Keeping with the theme of current events, Sykes references the scandal surrounding the Catholic Church and makes observations about the Pope. She then shifts the object of her comedy to the topic of drinking, exploring the pros and cons of drinking in different cities, the dynamics between drunken friends and drunk driving. Next, Sykes uses the matter of strip clubs as a precursor to describing some of the differences between the ways in which men and women think and communicate. This leads to a conversation about marriage, which Sykes compares to a relationship between business partners of which children are the resulting product. She shares her opinions on having children, which she admits is not something she sees herself doing, and then moves on to contemplate the aging process. The last topic that Sykes tackles is sex, finishing her performance by revealing her thoughts on why women fake pleasure.
