= Yeah, I Said It =

- Author: Wanda Sykes
- Language: English
- Genre: Humor
- Publisher: Atria
- Publication date: September 21, 2004
- Publication place: United States
- Pages: 256 pages
- ISBN: 978-0-7434-8269-1
- OCLC: 56474080
- Dewey Decimal: 814.6 22
- LC Class: PN6165 .S95 2004

Yeah, I Said It is a humor book by comedian Wanda Sykes. It contains jokes and rants about diverse topics such as sex, politics, war, homeland security, the death penalty, family, crime, guns, and race.
