= Wanda Sykes =

American comedian and actress (born 1962)

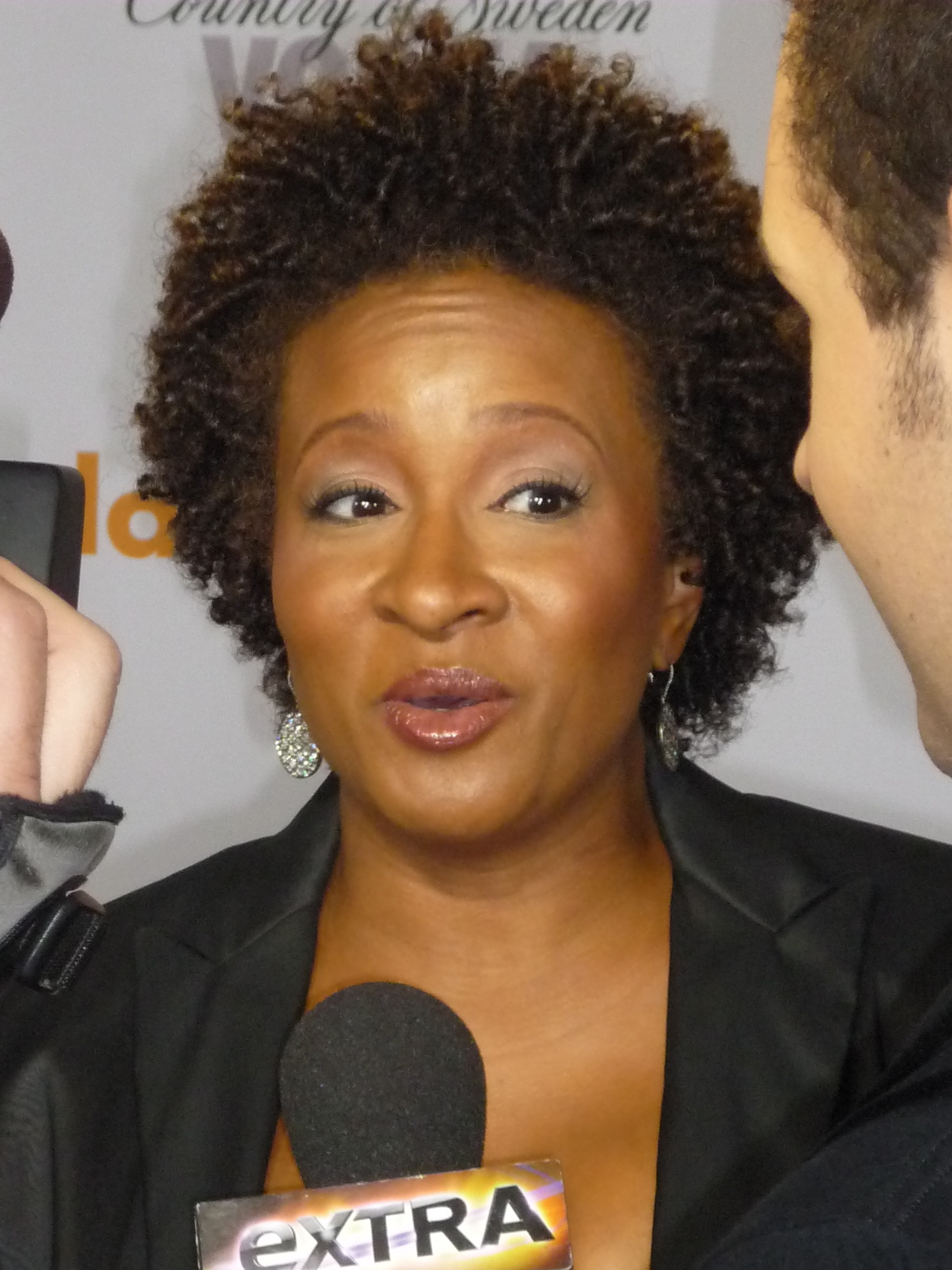
- Sykes at the 2010 GLAAD Media Awards
- Born: Wanda Yvette Sykes; March 7, 1964 (age 62); Portsmouth, Virginia, U.S.
- Education: Hampton University (BS)
- Spouses: Dave Hall (m. 1991; div. 1998) Alex Niedbalski (m. 2008)
- Children: 2

Comedy career
- Years active: 1987–present
- Medium: Stand-up; television; film
- Genres: Observational comedy; surreal humor; insult comedy; black comedy; blue comedy; satire
- Subjects: American politics; African-American culture; pop culture; racism; race relations; sexism; interpersonal relationships; human sexuality; traditions
- Website: wandasykes.com

Wanda Yvette Sykes (born March 7, 1964) is an American stand-up comedian, actress, and writer. She was first recognized for her work as a writer on The Chris Rock Show, for which she won a Primetime Emmy Award in 1999. In 2004, Entertainment Weekly named Sykes as one of the 25 funniest people in America. She is known for her recurring roles on CBS's The New Adventures of Old Christine (2006–10), and HBO's Curb Your Enthusiasm (2001–2011). She received Primetime Emmy Award for Outstanding Guest Actress in a Comedy Series nominations for her roles in ABC's Black-ish (2015–2022), and Amazon's The Marvelous Mrs. Maisel (2020). She stars in The Upshaws (2021–2026) on Netflix, a HBO Max comedy series, The Other Two (2019–2023), and The Good Fight (2021).

Aside from her television appearances, Sykes has had a career in film, appearing in Monster-in-Law (2005), My Super Ex-Girlfriend (2006), Evan Almighty (2007), and License to Wed (2007). She has voiced characters in animated films including Over the Hedge, Barnyard, Brother Bear 2 (all in 2006), Rio (2011), Ice Age: Continental Drift (2012), Ice Age: Collision Course (2016), and UglyDolls (2019).

== Early life and family ==
Wanda Sykes was born in Portsmouth, Virginia. Her family moved to Maryland when she was in the third grade. Her mother, Marion Louise (née Peoples), worked as a banker and her father, Harry Ellsworth Sykes, was a colonel in the U.S. Army at the Pentagon.

Sykes' family history was researched for an episode of the 2012 PBS genealogy program Finding Your Roots With Henry Louis Gates Jr. Her ancestry was traced back to a 1683 court case involving her ancestor, Elizabeth Banks, a free white woman and indentured servant, who gave birth to a biracial child, Mary Banks, fathered by a slave, who inherited her mother's free status. According to historian Ira Berlin, a specialist in the history of American slavery, the Sykes family history is "the only such case that I know of in which it is possible to trace a black family rooted in freedom from the late 17th century to the present."

Sykes attended Arundel High School in Gambrills, Maryland. She graduated from Hampton University in Hampton, Virginia, earning a Bachelor of Science degree in marketing and was in Alpha Kappa Alpha. After college, her first job was working for five years as a contracting specialist for the National Security Agency in Fort Meade, Maryland,

== Career ==
=== 1990s ===
Sykes began her stand-up career at a Coors Light Super Talent Showcase in Washington, D.C., where she performed for the first time in front of a live audience in 1987. She continued to perform on nights and weekends at local venues while at the NSA until 1992, when she moved to New York City. One of her early TV appearances was Russell Simmons' Def Comedy Jam in the early 1990s, where she shared the stage with Adele Givens, J. B. Smoove, D. L. Hughley, Bernie Mac, & Bill Bellamy. Working for the Hal Leonard publishing house, she edited a book entitled Polyrhythms – The Musician's Guide, by Peter Magadini.

Her first big break came when opening for Chris Rock at Caroline's Comedy Club. In 1997, she joined the writing team on The Chris Rock Show and also made many appearances on the show. The writing team was nominated for four Emmys, and in 1999, won for Outstanding Writing for a Variety, Music, or Comedy Special.

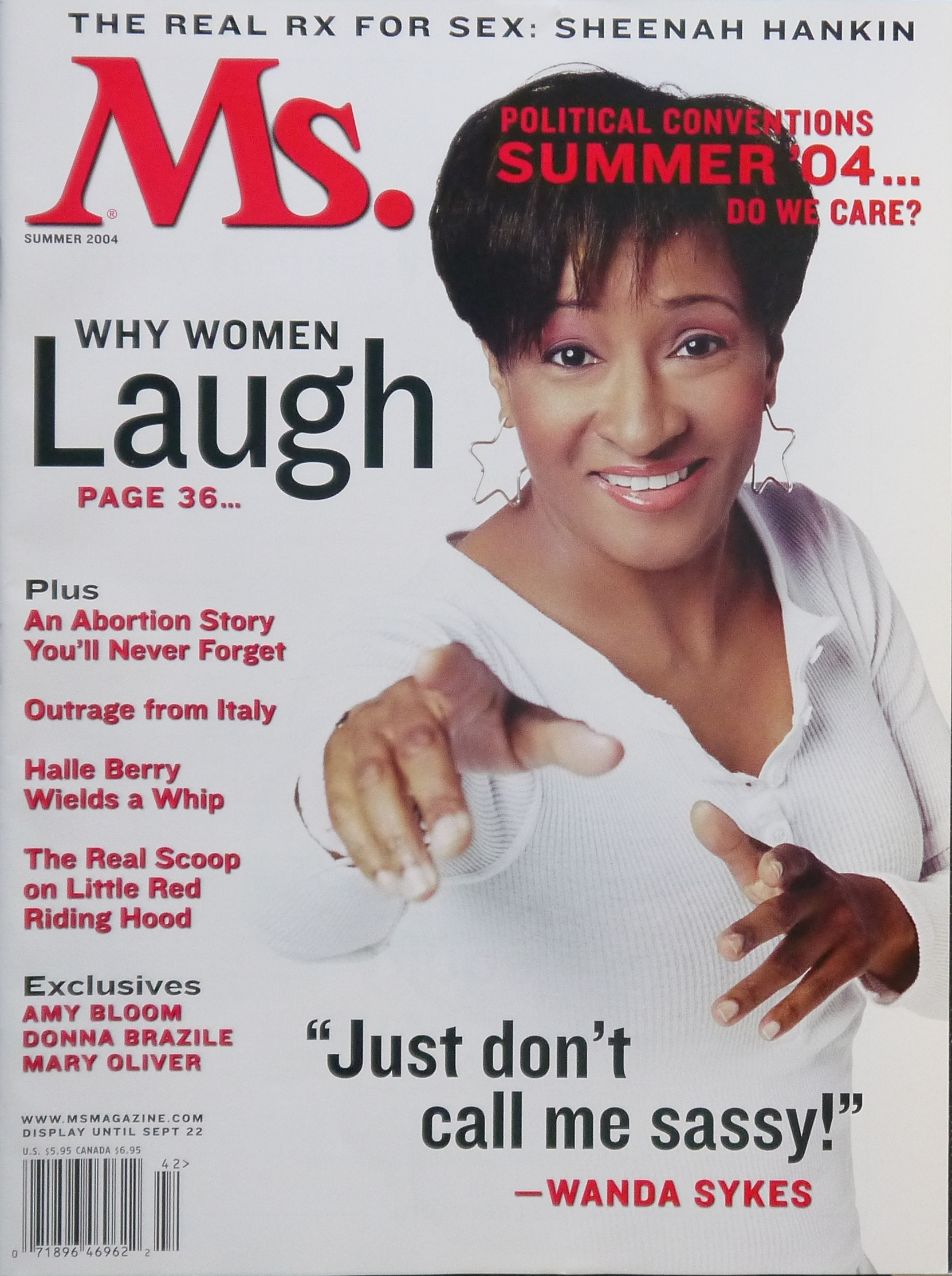
Sykes on the cover of Ms. magazine in 2004

Since then, she has appeared in the films Pootie Tang and on TV shows such as Curb Your Enthusiasm. In 2003, she starred in her own short-lived Fox network sitcom, Wanda at Large. The same year, Sykes appeared in an hour-long Comedy Central special, Tongue Untied. That network also ranked her No. 70 on its list of the 100 greatest all-time stand ups. She served as a correspondent for HBO's Inside the NFL, hosted Comedy Central's popular show Premium Blend, and voiced a recurring character named Gladys on Comedy Central's puppet show Crank Yankers. She also had a short-lived show on Comedy Central called Wanda Does It.

=== 2000s ===
Sykes wrote Yeah, I Said It, a book of humorous observations on various topics, published in September 2004. In 2006, she landed a recurring role as Barb, opposite Julia Louis-Dreyfus, on the sitcom The New Adventures of Old Christine; she became a series regular during the series' third season in 2008. She also guest starred in the Will & Grace episode "Buy, Buy Baby" in 2006. She provided voices for the 2006 films Over the Hedge, Barnyard, and Brother Bear 2. She had a part in My Super Ex-Girlfriend and after playing in Evan Almighty, had a bit part in License to Wed. Sykes's first HBO Comedy Special, entitled Wanda Sykes: Sick & Tired, premiered on October 14, 2006; it was nominated for a 2007 Emmy Award. In 2008, she performed as part of Cyndi Lauper's True Colors Tour for LGBT rights.

In October 2008, Sykes appeared in a television ad for the Think Before You Speak Campaign, an advertising campaign by GLSEN aimed at curbing homophobic slang in youth communities. In the 30-second spot, she uses humor to scold a teenager for saying "that's so gay" when he really means "that is so bad". In March 2009, Sykes became the host of a late-night talk show on Saturdays on Fox, The Wanda Sykes Show which was scheduled to premiere November 7, 2009. In April 2009, she was named in Out magazine's "Annual Power 50 List", landing at number 35.

In May 2009, Sykes was the featured entertainer for the annual White House Correspondents' Association dinner, becoming both the first African American woman and the first openly LGBTQ person to get the role. Cedric the Entertainer had been the first African American to become the featured entertainer in 2005. At this event, Sykes made controversial headlines as she responded to conservative radio talk show host Rush Limbaugh's comments regarding President Barack Obama. Limbaugh, in reference to Obama's presidential agenda, had said "I hope he fails". In response, Sykes quipped: "I hope his [Limbaugh's] kidneys fail, how 'bout that? Needs a little waterboarding, that's what he needs." Her second comedy special, Wanda Sykes: I'ma Be Me premiered on HBO in October 2009. November 2009 saw the premier of The Wanda Sykes Show, which starts with a monologue and continues with a panel discussion in a similar format to Bill Maher's shows Real Time with Bill Maher and Politically Incorrect.

=== 2010s ===
She appeared as Miss Hannigan in a professional theatre production of Annie at The Media Theatre in Media, PA, a suburb southwest of Philadelphia. Her first appearance in a musical, she played the role from November 23 to December 12, 2010, and again from January 12 to 23, 2011. She voices the Witch in the Bubble Guppies episode "Bubble Puppy's Fin-tastic Fairlytale Adventure". In 2012, Sykes played the role of Granny in Blue Sky Studios' Ice Age: Continental Drift. In 2016, she returned to the role in Ice Age: Collision Course. In May 2013, Sykes was a featured entertainer at Olivia Travel's 40th anniversary Music & Comedy Festival in Punta Cana, Dominican Republic.

In 2013, Sykes appeared in eight episodes of Amazon's Alpha House, a political comedy series written by Doonesbury creator Garry Trudeau. Sykes plays Rosalyn DuPeche, a Democratic Senator from Illinois and the next door neighbor of four Republican senators living together in a house on Capitol Hill. Sykes also appeared in Season Two, which became available in October 2014. The series was canceled after the second season. In 2018, Sykes became the head writer for the revived tenth season of Roseanne. This attracted attention due to star Roseanne Barr's history of controversial political remarks. On May 29, 2018, Sykes announced on Twitter that she would no longer be working on the series after a since-deleted Twitter rant by Roseanne Barr about Valerie Jarrett; Roseanne was subsequently canceled by ABC.

=== 2020s ===
In 2021, Sykes began starring on a Netflix sitcom, The Upshaws. Sykes co-hosted the 94th Academy Awards with Regina Hall and Amy Schumer on March 27, 2022. The telecast is most known for its infamous moment where Will Smith slapped Chris Rock. Sykes condemned the actions of Smith stating on Ellen "For [The Academy] to let him stay in that room and enjoy the rest of the show and accept his award, I was like, 'How gross is this? This is just the wrong message.' You assault somebody, you get escorted out of the building and that's it. For them to let him continue, I thought it was gross". In January 2023, Sykes guest hosted The Daily Show after Trevor Noah's departure.

== Personal life ==
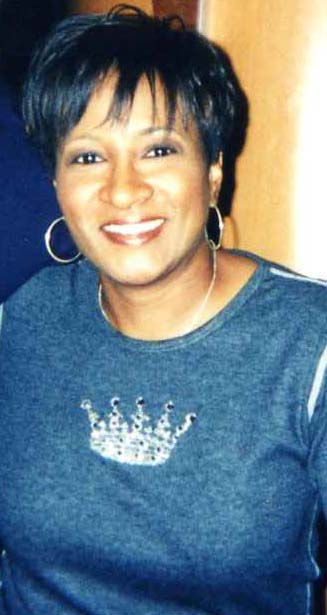
Sykes at a book signing at the Hue-Man bookstore in Harlem, New York, September 2004

Sykes was married to record producer Dave Hall from 1991 to 1998. In November 2008, she publicly came out as a lesbian while at a same-sex marriage (2008 California Proposition 8) rally in Las Vegas. In October 2008, Sykes and Alex Niedbalski married; Niedbalski is French. They met in 2006 and became parents in April 2009, when Niedbalski gave birth to a pair of fraternal twins.

Sykes came out to her parents in 2004 when she was 40; both initially had difficulty accepting her homosexuality. They declined to attend Sykes' wedding, which led to a brief period of estrangement, but they have since reconciled with her.

During a September 19, 2011, appearance on The Ellen DeGeneres Show, Sykes announced that she had been diagnosed earlier in the year with ductal carcinoma in situ (DCIS). Although DCIS is a non-invasive "stage zero breast cancer", Sykes had elected to have a bilateral mastectomy to lower her chances of getting breast cancer. Sykes splits time between Media, Pennsylvania, a suburb of Philadelphia and Cherry Grove, New York.

=== Activism ===
Sykes publicly expressed being devastated when California voters passed state Proposition 8. She said: "with the legislation that they passed, I can't sit by and just watch. I just can't do it." She has continued to be active in same-sex marriage issues hosting events and emceeing fundraisers. She has also worked with PETA on promoting dog anti-chaining legislation in her home state. She has been an outspoken supporter of Ruth Ellis Center in Detroit after the organization's staff sent Sykes a letter asking her to visit, during her 2010 tour's stop in Detroit.

Sykes often uses X to express her political views, including on May 25, 2021, retweeting a photograph by Evan Vucci of Gianna Floyd, daughter of George Floyd, entering the White House. On July 17, 2021, she also tweeted, "Congress MUST pass the #ForThePeopleAct", and called on her followers to join the "Good Trouble Vigil", commemorating the passing of activist and Congressman John Lewis. At the 2026 Golden Globes, Sykes wore a pin that said "Be Good" in honor of Renée Good.

== Filmography ==
=== Film ===
List of film credits
Year	Title	Role	Notes
1998	Tomorrow Night	Wanda (Mel's Date)	credited as Wanda Sykes-Hall
2000	Nutty Professor II: The Klumps	Chantal	
2001	Down to Earth	Wanda	
2001	Pootie Tang	Biggie Shorty	
2003	MTV: Reloaded	The Oracle	Short film
2005	Monster-in-Law	Ruby	
2006	The Adventures of Brer Rabbit	Sister Moon	Voice; Direct-to-video
2006	Over the Hedge	Stella	Voice
2006	Hammy's Boomerang Adventure	Stella	Voice; short film
2006	Clerks II	Angry Customer	
2006	My Super Ex-Girlfriend	Carla Dunkirk	
2006	Barnyard	Bessy	Voice
2006	Brother Bear 2	Innoko	Voice; Direct-to-video
2006	CondomNation	Linda	
2007	Evan Almighty	Rita Daniels	
2007	License to Wed	Nurse Borman	
2011	Rio	Chloe the Canada goose	Voice
2011	The Muppets	Officer Ethel	Cameo, deleted scene
2012	Ice Age: Continental Drift	Granny	Voice
2013	The Hot Flashes	Florine Clarkston	
2016	Ice Age: Collision Course	Granny	Voice
2016	Bad Moms	Dr. Karl	
2017	Snatched	Ruth	
2017	A Bad Moms Christmas	Dr. Karl	
2018	Hurricane Bianca 2: From Russia with Hate	Prison Matron	
2019	UglyDolls	Wage	Voice
2019	The Wedding Year	Janet / Grandma	
2019	Jexi	Denice	
2020	Friendsgiving	Fairy Gay Mother	
2021	Breaking News in Yuba County	Rita	
2021	The One and Only Dick Gregory	Herself	Documentary
2024	Saving Bikini Bottom: The Sandy Cheeks Movie	Sue Nahmee	
2025	Undercard	Cheryl 'No Mercy' Stewart	

=== Television ===
List of television credits
Year	Title	Role	Notes
1997–2000	The Chris Rock Show	Various Characters	7 episodes
1999	Best of the Chris Rock Show	Various Characters	TV special
1999	Dr. Katz, Professional Therapist	Wanda	Voice, 2 episodes
2001	The Downer Channel	Various	2 episodes
2001	The Drew Carey Show	Christine Watson	3 episodes
2001–11	Curb Your Enthusiasm	Herself	9 episodes
2002–05; 2019–22	Crank Yankers	Wanda / Gladys Murphy	Voice, 19 episodes
2003	Wanda at Large	Wanda Mildred Hawkins	19 episodes
2003	Chappelle's Show	Herself	Episode: "The Best of Chappelle's Show: Volume 2 Mixtape"
2003	Mad TV	Herself	Season 9 episode 903
2004	Wanda Does It	Herself	6 episodes
2006	Will & Grace	Cricket Walker	Episode: "Buy, Buy Baby"
2006	Sick and Tired	Herself	HBO comedy special
2006–10	The New Adventures of Old Christine	Barbara "Barb" Baran	54 episodes; (Recurring Seasons 1–2, Starring Seasons 3–5)
2007–11	Back at the Barnyard	Bessy	Voice, 50 episodes
2009	Wanda Sykes: I'ma Be Me	Herself	HBO comedy special
2009	White House Correspondents' Dinner	Herself (host)	TV special
2009–10	The Wanda Sykes Show	Herself	21 episodes; also creator, writer, executive producer
2011	Drop Dead Diva	Judge	Episode: "Prom"
2012	Bubble Guppies	The Witch	Voice, episode: "Bubble Puppy's Fin-tastic Fairy Tale!"
2012	Futurama	Bev the vending machine	Voice, episode: "The Bots and the Bees"
2013	The Simpsons	School Therapist / Counselor	Voice, episode: "What Animated Women Want"
2013	Real Husbands of Hollywood	Wanda Sykes	2 episodes
2013–14	Alpha House	Senator Rosalyn DuPeche	Recurring role
2014, 2019	Last Week Tonight with John Oliver	Herself	2 episodes
2015	Repeat After Me	Herself	1 episode
2015, 2017	Penn Zero: Part-Time Hero	Shirley B. Awesome	Voice, 2 episodes
2015–20	Black-ish	Daphne Lido	16 episodes
2016	Bob's Burgers	Sofa Queen	Voice, episode: "Sacred Couch"
2016	Animals	Chance	Voice, 2 episodes
2016	What Happened... Ms. Sykes?	Herself	Epix comedy special
2017	Lip Sync Battle	Herself	Episode: "Don Cheadle vs. Wanda Sykes"
2017	Doc McStuffins	Thea	Voice, episode: "The Emergency Plan"
2017–21	Vampirina	Gregoria	Voice, main cast
2017–19	Broad City	Dara	Recurring role
2018	Ask the StoryBots	Doctor	Episode: "How Do People Catch a Cold?"
2018	BoJack Horseman	Mary-Beth	Voice, episode: "INT. SUB"
2019	The Bravest Knight	Mona the Mayor	Voice, episode: "Cedric & the Pixies"
2019	Scooby-Doo and Guess Who?	Herself	Voice, episode: "Peebles' Pet Shop of Terrible Terrors!"
2019	Live in Front of a Studio Audience	Louise Jefferson	Episode: "Norman Lear's All in the Family and The Jeffersons"
2019	Wanda Sykes: Not Normal	Herself	Netflix comedy special
2019	Summer Camp Island	Ethel	Episode: "The Great Elf Invention Convention"
2019	Big Mouth	Ghost of Harriet Tubman	Voice, episode: "Duke"
2019	The Marvelous Mrs. Maisel	Moms Mabley	Episode: "A Jewish Girl Walks Into the Apollo..."
2019	RuPaul's Drag Race	Herself	Episode: "Bring Back My Queens!"
2019–23	The Other Two	Shuli Kucerac	Recurring role
2019–20	Harley Quinn	Tsaritsa / Queen of Fables	Voice, 3 episodes
2020	Mapleworth Murders	Leigh Drain	Episode: "Killer Voices – Part 2"
2020–21	Tig n' Seek	Nuritza	Voice, 15 episodes
2021	The Good Fight	Allegra Durado	3 episodes
2021	Q-Force	Deb	Voice, main role
2021–26	The Upshaws	Lucretia Turner	Main role, 60 episodes; also co-creator, writer, executive producer
2022	94th Academy Awards	Herself (co-host)	TV special
2022	Chivalry	Jean Shrill	Main role
2022	Gutsy	Herself	Episode: "Gutsy Women Have the Last Laugh"
2023	Star Wars: The Bad Batch	Phee Genoa	Voice, 5 episodes
2023	History of the World, Part II	Various	8 episodes; also writer and executive producer
2023	The Daily Show	Herself (guest host)	4 Episodes (Week of Jan. 23)
2023	Jimmy Kimmel Live!	Herself (guest)	Episode: October 4
2023–24	Velma	Linda Blake	Voice, 9 episodes
2024	Rock Paper Scissors	Dian	Voice, episode: "Trash"
2026	Survival of the Thickest	Dr. Terri Lynn	3 episodes

Also starred as Aunt Lucretia on “The Upshaws” a comedy about a working class family in middle America with real-life issues. Huge emphasis on family. Produced and created by Regina Hi is and Wanda Sykes.

=== Video game ===
List of video game credits
Year	Title	Role	Notes
2012	Ice Age: Continental Drift - Arctic Games	Granny	Voice
2022	Tiny Tina's Wonderlands	Frette	Voice

=== Writer ===
List of writing credits
Year	Title	Role	Notes
1997–1998	The Keenen Ivory Wayans Show	Writer	11 episodes
1997–2000	The Chris Rock Show	Writer	Wrote 33 episodes; Co-produced 14 episodes
1998	Comedy Central Presents	Herself and writer (as Wanda Sykes-Hall)	Episode: "Wanda Sykes-Hall"
2001	Best of the Chris Rock Show: Volume 2	Writer	TV special
2001	The Downer Channel	Writer	Wrote the first 2 episodes
2002	The 74th Annual Academy Awards	Special material written by	Award show
2002–2003	Premium Blend	Writer	4 episodes/Stand-up
2003	Wanda Sykes: Tongue Untied	Writer	Stand-up
2003	Wanda at Large	Creator, writer and producer	19 episodes
2004	Wanda Does It	Creator, writer and executive producer	6 episodes
2006	Wanda Sykes: Sick and Tired	Writer	Stand-up
2009	Wanda Sykes: I'ma Be Me	Writer	Stand-up
2009–2010	The Wanda Sykes Show	Creator, writer and executive producer	21 episodes
2016	What Happened... Ms. Sykes?	Writer	Stand-up
2018	Roseanne	Writer	Sitcom
2019	Wanda Sykes: Not Normal	Writer	Stand-up
2023	Wanda Sykes: I'm an Entertainer	Writer	Stand-up
2026	Wanda Sykes: Legacy	Writer	Stand-up

== Awards and nominations ==
=== Emmy Awards ===
Year	Category	Work	Result	Ref.
Daytime Emmy Awards
2021	Outstanding Guest Performer in a Daytime Fiction Program	Noah's Arc: The 'Rona Chronicles	Nominated	
Primetime Emmy Awards
1998	Outstanding Writing for a Variety Series	The Chris Rock Show	Nominated	
1999	Outstanding Writing for a Variety Series	The Chris Rock Show	Won	
2000	Outstanding Writing for a Variety Series	The Chris Rock Show	Nominated	
2001	Outstanding Writing for a Variety Series	The Chris Rock Show	Nominated	
2007	Outstanding Variety Special	Wanda Sykes: Sick and Tired	Nominated	
2010	Outstanding Variety Special	Wanda Sykes: I'ma Be Me	Nominated	
2010	Outstanding Writing for a Variety Special	Wanda Sykes: I'ma Be Me	Nominated	
2017	Outstanding Guest Actress in a Comedy Series	Black-ish (episode: "Lemons")	Nominated	
2018	Outstanding Guest Actress in a Comedy Series	Black-ish (episode: "Juneteenth")	Nominated	
2019	Outstanding Writing for Variety Special	Wanda Sykes: Not Normal	Nominated	
2019	Outstanding Variety Special	Wanda Sykes: Not Normal	Nominated	
2020	Outstanding Variety Special	Tiffany Haddish: Black Mitzvah	Nominated	
2020	Outstanding Guest Actress in a Comedy Series	The Marvelous Mrs. Maisel (episode: "A Jewish Girl Walks Into the Apollo...")	Nominated	
2020	Outstanding Character Voice-Over Performance	Crank Yankers (episode: "Bobby Brown, Wanda Sykes & Kathy Griffin")	Nominated	
2023	Outstanding Character Voice-Over Performance	Crank Yankers (episode: "Wanda Sykes, JB Smoove & Adam Carolla")	Nominated	
2023	Outstanding Variety Special (Pre-Taped)	Wanda Sykes: I'm an Entertainer	Nominated	
2023	Outstanding Writing for a Variety Special	Wanda Sykes: I'm an Entertainer	Nominated	
2026	Outstanding Writing for a Variety Special	Wanda Sykes: Legacy	Nominated	

=== Golden Globe Awards ===
Year	Category	Work	Result	Ref.
2024	Best Performance in Stand-Up Comedy on Television	Wanda Sykes: I'm an Entertainer	Nominated	

=== Grammy Awards ===
Year	Category	Work	Result	Ref.
2024	Best Comedy Album	Wanda Sykes: I'm An Entertainer	Nominated	

=== NAACP Image Awards ===
Year	Category	Work	Result
2005	Outstanding Supporting Actress in a Comedy Series	Curb Your Enthusiasm	Nominated
2006	Outstanding Supporting Actress in a Comedy Series	Curb Your Enthusiasm	Nominated
2007	Outstanding Supporting Actress in a Comedy Series	The New Adventures of Old Christine	Nominated
2010	Outstanding Talk Series	The Wanda Sykes Show	Nominated
2010	Outstanding Variety	Wanda Sykes: I'ma be Me	Nominated
2016	Outstanding Character Voice-Over Performance (Television or Theatrical)	Penn Zero: Part-Time Hero	Nominated
2020	Outstanding Variety (Series or Special)	Wanda Sykes: Not Normal	Nominated
2022	Outstanding Supporting Actress in a Comedy Series	The Upshaws	Nominated
2023	Outstanding Supporting Actress in a Comedy Series	The Upshaws	Nominated
2024	Outstanding Variety Show (Series or Special)	Wanda Sykes: I'm An Entertainer	Nominated
2025	Outstanding Supporting Actress in a Comedy Series	The Upshaws	Nominated
2026	Outstanding Supporting Actress in a Comedy Series	The Upshaws	Nominated

=== Miscellaneous awards and nominations ===
List of awards and nominations received by Wanda Sykes
Year	Award	Category	Work	Result	Ref.
2001	American Comedy Awards	Funniest Female Stand-Up Comic	Herself	Won	
2004	BET Comedy Awards	Outstanding Lead Actress in a Comedy Series	Wanda At Large	Nominated	
2005	BET Comedy Awards	Outstanding Supporting Actress in a Theatrical Film	Monster-In-Law	Won	
2007	Annie Awards	Best Voice Acting in an Animated Feature Production	Over the Hedge	Nominated	
2010	GLAAD Media Awards	Stephen F. Kolzak Award	Herself	Honored	
2014	New York Women in Film & Television	Muse Award	Herself	Honored	
2015	Triumph Awards	Activism in the Arts	Herself	Honored	
2025	Critics Choice Association	Celebration of LGBTQ+ Cinema & Television	Herself	Honored	
2025	The Queerties	Comic	Herself	Won	

== Discography ==
List of recording credits
Year	Title	Label	Formats
2003	Tongue Untied	Comedy Central	DVD/Download/Streaming
2007	Sick and Tired	Image	DVD/Download/Streaming
2010	I'ma Be Me	HBO	DVD/Download/Streaming
2016	What Happened... Ms. Sykes?	Epix/Sykes Entertainment	Audio and Video Download/Streaming (2018)
2019	Not Normal	Netflix	Streaming
2023	I’m an Entertainer	Netflix	Streaming
2026	Legacy	Netflix	Streaming
