= Wanda Does It =

American television sitcom

- Starring: Wanda Sykes; Tim Bagley; Sue Murphy
- Country of origin: United States
- No. of seasons: 1
- No. of episodes: 6

Production
- Running time: 30 minutes including commercials

Original release
- Network: Comedy Central
- Release: October 5 – November 16, 2004

Wanda Does It is an American television sitcom that aired on Comedy Central from October 5 to November 16, 2004. It displays "a day in the life" of the world of comedian Wanda Sykes. The series was canceled in early January 2005.

== Cast ==
- Wanda Sykes as herself
- Tim Bagley as Tim Brewer
- Sue Murphy as herself

== Episodes ==
=== Season 1 ===
1. "Wanda Does Repo"—After her friend, Jen, buys her car and her check bounces, Wanda decides to become a repo woman to get her car back and teach Jen a lesson.
2. "Wanda Does Vegas"—After Wanda's show is canceled at a Las Vegas casino, Wanda learns how to become a professional gambler and get the money she was going to get from them.
3. "Wanda Does the Sky"—After taking a horrible flight, Wanda decides that if anyone else can be a pilot, she can too and flies an airplane.
4. "Wanda Does the Night"—When an audience member heckles Wanda during one of her shows, Wanda decides to follow her to her job to heckle her back, but discovers that the woman who heckled her is actually a prostitute
5. "Wanda Does the WNBA"—Wanda decides to prove that she's got game by becoming the coach of the WNBA team the Los Angeles Sparks. Tim is also having a dispute with someone who wants to cast Wanda in a cartoon. Guest stars include Molly Bryant as a coach, Tom Virtue as a referee, and Hans Raith as a bouncer
6. "Wanda Does Photos"—After Wanda sees a bad headshot of herself that her publishing company wants to use for her book, she decides to go behind the camera to take her own photo.
