= America at the Movies =

- Film poster
- Directed by: George Stevens Jr.
- Written by: Theodore Strauss
- Produced by: George Stevens Jr.
- Narrated by: Charlton Heston
- Edited by: David Saxon
- Production company: American Film Institute
- Distributed by: Cinema 5 Distributing
- Release date: 1976
- Running time: 116 min.
- Country: United States
- Language: English

America at the Movies is a 1976 documentary film by George Stevens Jr.

== Summary ==
A Bicentennial tribute featuring 83 clips from every era of American cinema focusing on five historical characteristics: The Land, The Cities, The Families, The Wars and The Spirit.

== Production ==
The film was created by the American Film Institute in collaboration with the American Revolution Bicentennial Administration and narrated by Charlton Heston. Nelson Riddle conducted and arranged the title music.

The tagline for the film was "You want superstars? We got 'em".

== Release ==
The film premiered at the Kennedy Center in Washington D.C. Among those that attended were the film's consultant David Wolper, 500 members of AFI, 22 senators and 125 members of Congress. The film also played in schools, embassies and consulates overseas.

It made its television debut on PBS that same year on September 26.

== See also ==
Similar documentaries:

- That's Entertainment! (1974)
- Brother, Can You Spare a Dime? (1975)
- Precious Images (1986)
