= Pet Stars =

- Genre: Reality show
- Country of origin: United States
- Original language: English
- No. of seasons: 1
- No. of episodes: 5

Production
- Running time: 26–28 min

Original release
- Network: Netflix
- Release: April 30, 2021

Pet Stars is a reality television series starring Colleen Wilson and Melissa May Curtis that aired on Netflix on April 30, 2021.

== Cast ==
- Colleen Wilson
- Melissa May Curtis
- Shai Lighter
- Osama Ellahib
- Cierra Marie
- Dane Andrew
- Ngozika Okeke
- Rascal the Ugliest Dog

== Episodes ==
No.	Title	Original release date
1	"Ugly Is Beautiful"	April 30, 2021
2	"Party Animals"	April 30, 2021
3	"Leapin' Lizards"	April 30, 2021
4	"Canine Couture"	April 30, 2021
5	"Tides & Tails"	April 30, 2021
