= George Stevens Jr. =

American film director

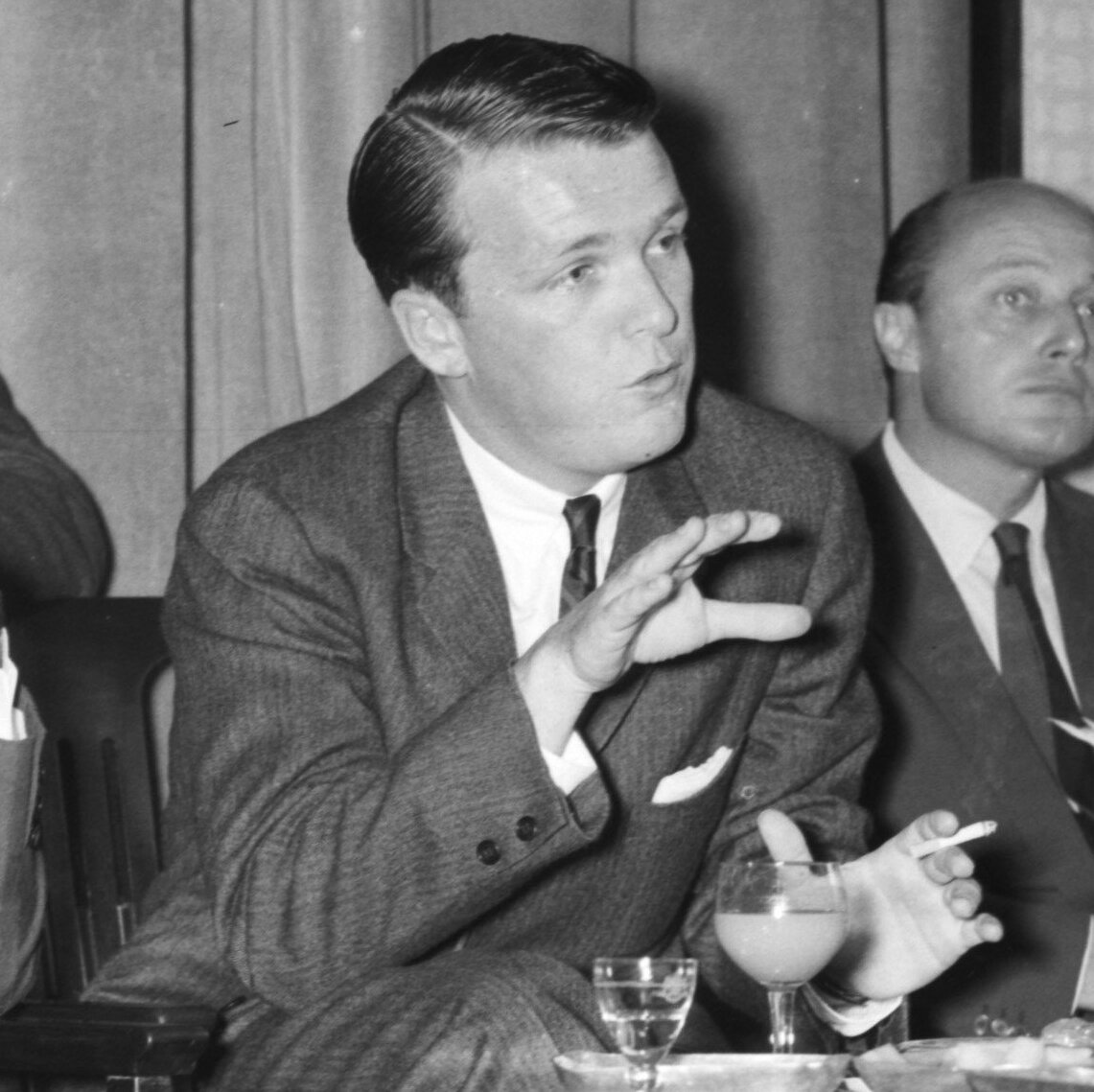
- Stevens in 1958
- Born: George Cooper Stevens Jr. April 3, 1932 (age 94); Los Angeles, California, U.S.
- Education: Occidental College
- Organization: American Film Institute
- Known for: Film and television
- Spouse: Elizabeth Guest
- Children: Michael Stevens; David Stevens and Caroline Stevens (step-daughter)
- Parent(s): George Stevens and Yvonne Howell

George Cooper Stevens Jr. (born April 3, 1932) is an American writer, playwright, director, and producer. He is the founder of the American Film Institute, creator of the AFI Life Achievement Award, and co-creator of the Kennedy Center Honors. He has also served as co-chairman of the President's Committee on the Arts and Humanities.

== Personal life ==
Stevens was born and grew up in Los Angeles, California. His father was the film director George Stevens and his mother Yvonne Howell was an actress. Stevens' grandparents were also in the entertainment industry. His maternal grandmother Alice Howell was a silent comedy film actress, and his paternal grandparents Landers Stevens and Georgia Cooper Stevens were film actors.

In 1965, he married Elizabeth Guest, the daughter of Lily Polk Guest. With his wife, Stevens has two sons, David Stevens and film producer Michael Stevens (1966–2015), and a stepdaughter, documentary producer Caroline Stevens.

== Career ==
=== Early career ===
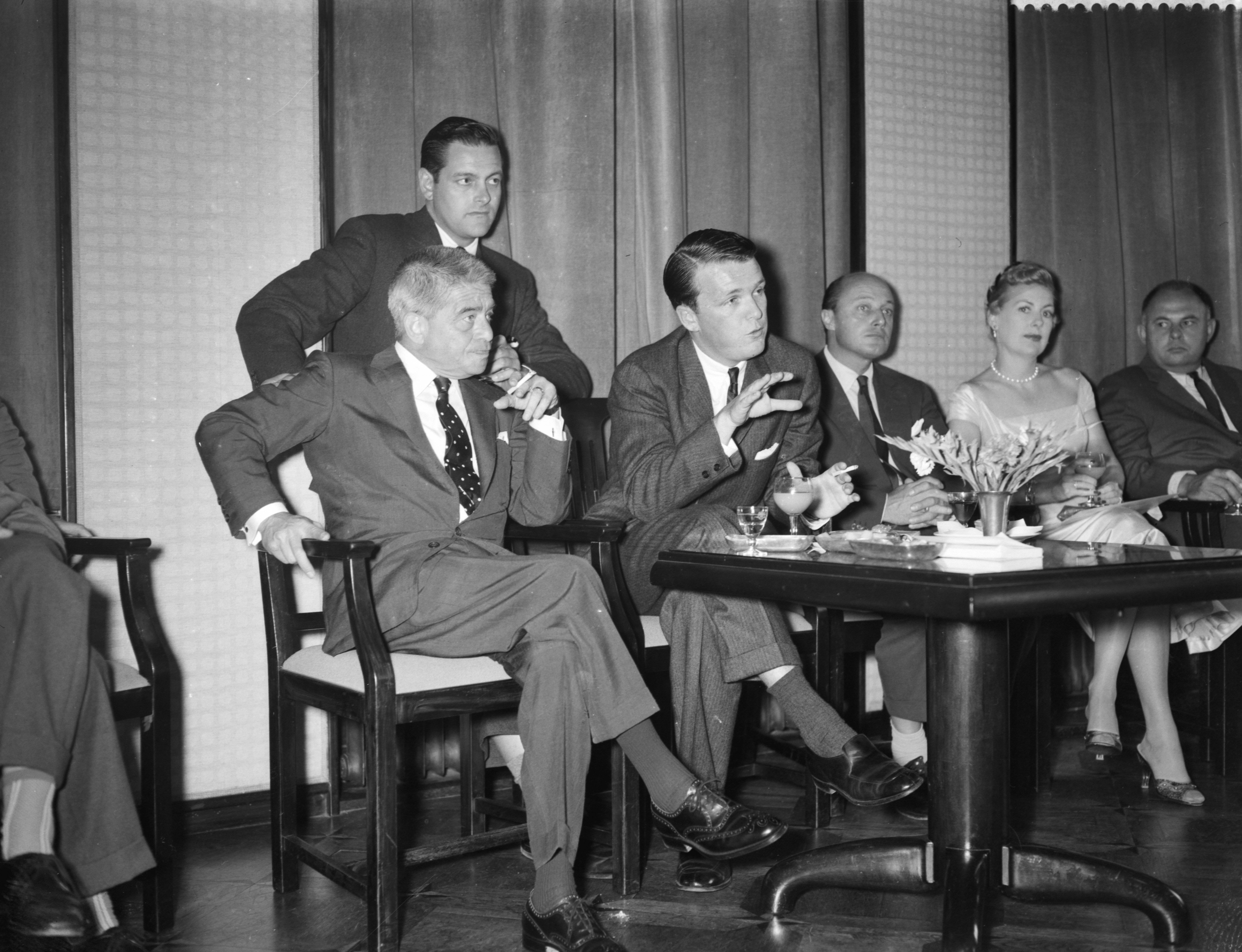
George Stevens Jr., associate producer of The Diary of Anne Frank, speaks at a July 1958 press conference in Amsterdam, with music director Alfred Newman on his left.

After graduating from Occidental College in 1953, Stevens enlisted in the United States Air Force, where he directed training films. He began his career in Hollywood as a production assistant on several of his father's movies, including A Place in the Sun, Shane, and Giant. He was also an associate producer and director of location scenes on his father's drama The Diary of Anne Frank.

In 1957, Stevens directed a pilot for Dragnet creator Jack Webb called People. NBC turned the pilot down, but ABC aired it as a special in December of 1957. Stevens then went on to direct episodes of another Webb-created series, The D.A.'s Man, in 1959. He did additional TV directing work on shows such as Alfred Hitchcock Presents and Peter Gunn.

=== United States Information Agency ===
In 1962, while he was doing pre-production work on The Greatest Story Ever Told, Stevens was recruited by Edward R. Murrow to serve as director of the Motion Picture and Television Service, a division of the United States Information Agency. At age 31, Stevens moved from Los Angeles to Washington, D.C., where as director of the service, he produced roughly 300 short documentary films per year. One of the films Stevens commissioned was Nine from Little Rock, which followed the experiences of nine African-American students attending a previously all-white high school in Little Rock, Arkansas in 1957. That film won an Academy Award for documentary short in 1965. Stevens also produced the agency's first full-length film, a 90-minute documentary about John F. Kennedy's presidency and death called Years of Lightning, Day of Drums, which in 1964 was named one of the Ten Best Films of the Year by the National Board of Review.

=== American Film Institute ===
In 1965, Stevens was a consultant in the process that established the National Endowment for the Arts. In June 1967, at age 35, Stevens resigned from his position at the USIA to join the American Film Institute, which was created using NEA funds, as its founding director. Stevens initially ran the AFI out of a suite in the John F. Kennedy Center for the Performing Arts and in his first days on the job began reaching out to American universities with film programs to see how the institute could best aid their efforts to develop the talents of young filmmakers and preserve archival copies of important films.

In 1969, Stevens led the effort to establish the AFI's Center for Advanced Film studies, now known as the AFI Conservatory. Over the course of Stevens's tenure as founding director of the AFI, this developmental wing of the institute produced notable writer-directors such as Paul Schrader, David Lynch, and Terrence Malick.

Under Stevens, the AFI preserved and restored approximately 14,000 films between 1967 and 1977. He oversaw the launch of AFI's magazine, American Film, which had around 100,000 subscribers in 1977, and opened a repertory theater at the Kennedy Center in 1973. Stevens also helped raise funds that financed independent film projects like Barbara Kopple's Harlan County, U.S.A. and Robert Kramer's Ice.

In 1973, Stevens established the AFI Life Achievement Award, to honor and recognize decorated figures in the American film industry such as Orson Welles, James Cagney, Bette Davis, and Lillian Gish. Stevens produced and wrote for the Life Achievement Award's television broadcast from its inception until 1998.

Stevens stepped down as head of the AFI in 1980.

=== Kennedy Center Honors and other work ===
In 1978, along with Nick Vanoff, Stevens co-created the Kennedy Center Honors, a ceremony and television production recognizing people who have made significant contributions to American culture through the performing arts, such as Meryl Streep, Stephen Sondheim, and Jessye Norman. Stevens wrote and produced the television special from 1978 until 2014. The majority of the 14 Emmys Stevens won over the course of his career came from producing the special.

In 1982, Stevens created Christmas in Washington, a musical television special benefitting the Children's National Hospital. He wrote and produced the show, which aired on NBC for 17 years and TNT for 15 years, until its final production in 2014.

In the early 1980s, Stevens wrote and directed a documentary focusing on his father's life and work in the film industry. The documentary, titled George Stevens: A Filmmaker's Journey was first shown in the summer of 1984 at the Deauville American Film Festival, and was released commercially in the US in April 1985. Stevens included interviews with actors and directors who worked with his father, as well as footage from World War II taken by his father's military film unit that had been kept in a storehouse for several decades. The films contained the only known color footage of World War II, according to Stevens. The documentary won awards including an International Documentary Association Distinguished Achievement Award in 1985 and a Writers Guild of America Award in 1989 for its ABC television broadcast.

In 1985, after a BBC journalist based in Washington D.C., Margaret Jay, saw the World War II color footage in Stevens' documentary, Stevens permitted the BBC to use his father's films to create a documentary about the war. In 1994, Stevens produced a documentary titled George Stevens: D-Day to Berlin, for which he and his colleague Catherine Shields received three Emmy Awards that year. The filmmakers who created the 1985 BBC documentary became aware of the 1994 film in 2019, and asked the Television Academy to investigate similarities between the two films. The Academy concluded that the two films "shared some production elements", and due to that, Stevens' documentary was ineligible to have been entered to the awards. The Emmys were rescinded in 2020.

Stevens wrote and directed the 1991 television movie Separate but Equal, starring Sidney Poitier as Thurgood Marshall. The movie, which aired over two nights on ABC, depicts Marshall and a team of NAACP staffers arguing and winning the landmark Brown v. Board of Education case in the United States Supreme Court. It was nominated for a Best Television Motion Picture Golden Globe and won the 1991 Emmy for Outstanding Drama/Comedy Special and Miniseries.

Stevens wrote the play Thurgood, which dramatizes Marshall's life and career. In 2006, it premiered for the stage at the Westport Country Playhouse, with James Earl Jones playing the titular role. In 2008, the play made its Broadway premiere with Laurence Fishburne playing Marshall. One of Fishburne's performances was filmed by Stevens's son Michael and aired on HBO as a television movie in 2011.

In 2009, Stevens was appointed by Barack Obama as co-chairman of the President's Committee on the Arts and Humanities.

== Awards ==
Stevens has been nominated for an Emmy 38 times and has won 14 Emmys, as of 2022. He has received two Peabody Awards, one for The Murder of Mary Phagan and another for the 1986 Kennedy Center Honors.

He has won eight awards from the Writers Guild of America. In 1992, Stevens won the WGA's Paul Selvin Award for his Separate but Equal screenplay. He also won a Humanitas Prize in 2012 for Thurgood.

In December 2012, Stevens was awarded an honorary Oscar for his lifelong contributions to the film industry. He was presented the award by his friend and colleague Sidney Poitier.

In January 2025, President Joe Biden awarded Stevens with a Presidential Medal of Freedom. Stevens received the honor for dedicating to preserve and celebrate the best of American film and performing arts.

== Notable works ==
=== Television and film ===
- The Diary of Anne Frank (1959, associate producer and director of location scenes)
- Alfred Hitchcock Presents (1961–62, director)
- America at the Movies (1976)
- Kennedy Center Honors (1978–2015, producer and writer)
- AFI Life Achievement Award (1981–98, producer and writer)
- The Murder of Mary Phagan (1988, producer and writer)
- Separate but Equal (1991, executive producer, writer, and director)
- The Thin Red Line (1998, executive producer)
- We Are One: The Obama Inaugural Celebration at the Lincoln Memorial (2009, executive producer)

=== Stage ===
- Thurgood (2006, writer)

=== Books ===
- Conversations with the Great Moviemakers of Hollywood's Golden Age at the American Film Institute (2006, editor)
- Conversations at the American Film Institute with the Great Moviemakers: The Next Generation (2012, editor)
- My Place in the Sun: Life in the Golden Age of Hollywood and Washington (2022, author)
