= A Man and His Music + Ella + Jobim =

- Directed by: Michael Pfleghar
- Starring: Frank Sinatra; Ella Fitzgerald; Antonio Carlos Jobim
- Country of origin: United States
- Original language: English

Production
- Producer: Robert Scheerer
- Production locations: Color City, Burbank, California
- Camera setup: Multiple
- Running time: 60 minutes

Original release
- Network: NBC
- Release: November 13, 1967

Related
- A Man and His Music – Part II; Francis Albert Sinatra Does His Thing (November 25, 1968); Sinatra (November 5, 1969); Ol' Blue Eyes Is Back (November 18, 1973)

A Man and His Music + Ella + Jobim is a 1967 television special starring Frank Sinatra, Ella Fitzgerald, and Antonio Carlos Jobim, accompanied by Nelson Riddle and his orchestra. The medley that Jobim and Sinatra sing together was arranged by Claus Ogerman.

The title is a reference to Sinatra's previous two television specials by this name, 1965's A Man and His Music, the following years A Man and His Music - Part II and his 1965 album, A Man and His Music, which won the Grammy Award for Album of the Year at the Grammy Awards of 1967.

Earlier in the year Sinatra had recorded the album Francis Albert Sinatra & Antonio Carlos Jobim with Jobim, and this show offered a rare opportunity to see them both in live performance.

Sinatra had featured Fitzgerald on his Timex television shows in the late 1950s, and this show marked their first television appearance together since then. They performed a swinging duet of "The Lady Is a Tramp". Fitzgerald's pianist, Paul Smith said, "Ella loved working with [Frank]. Sinatra gave her his dressing room on A Man and His Music and couldn't do enough for her." Fitzgerald and Sinatra came close to recording together around this period, but the plans were eventually scuppered.

== Tracks ==
1. "Day In, Day Out"
2. "Get Me to the Church on Time"
3. "What Now My Love"
4. "Ol' Man River"
5. "All I Need Is the Girl"
6. Ella Fitzgerald: "Body and Soul"
7. Ella Fitzgerald: "It's All Right with Me"
8. Duet Medley with Ella: "How High the Moon"/"Up, Up and Away"/"Don't Cry, Joe (Let Her Go, Let Her Go, Let Her Go)"/"Ode to Billie Joe"/"Goin' Out of My Head"
9. Duet Medley with Jobim: "Quiet Nights of Quiet Stars"/"Change Partners"/"I Concentrate on You"/"The Girl from Ipanema"
10. Duet Medley with Ella: "The Song Is You"/"They Can't Take That Away from Me"/"Stompin' at the Savoy"
11. "At Long Last Love"
12. Ella Fitzgerald: "Don't Be That Way"
13. Duet with Ella: "The Lady Is a Tramp"
14. "Put Your Dreams Away (For Another Day)"
