= I'ma Be Me =

I'ma Be Me is a stand-up comedy special written and performed by actress and comedian Wanda Sykes. The show premiered on October 10, 2009 on HBO. It was directed by Beth McCarthy-Miller and was filmed in front of a live audience at the Warner Theatre in Washington, D.C. The show was nominated for two 2010 Emmy Awards including Outstanding Variety, Music or Comedy Special and Outstanding Writing for a Variety, Music or Comedy Special. In a review of the performance Rip Empson of the Huffington Post says, "Sykes shows that her swagger hasn't been slowed by maturity or motherhood."

== Plot ==
Sykes opens her stand-up routine by discussing the United States' first black president, Barack Obama. She uses this discussion to bring up some of the stereotypes facing African-American people in the US. Sykes also talks about some of the rhetoric surrounding Michelle Obama, calling the media out for asking when they will see, "the real Michelle Obama," the implication of which is that Michelle Obama's calm demeanor is an act to make her seem less stereotypically African-American. Sykes goes on to talk about some of the issues facing the President such as reforming health-care, national resistance to change, revamping education, immigration and racial injustice. In this way, Sykes' comedy follows a very natural progression, centering on politics and flowing easily from one topic to the next.

Sykes then shifts the conversation to talking about some of her personal experiences. She discusses marrying her current partner, publicly coming out as a lesbian, and having kids, something that she had previously stated, on many occasions, was not something she envisioned for herself. She also talks about the aging process and the ways that her body has changed as she has gotten older.
