= A Man and His Music – Part II =

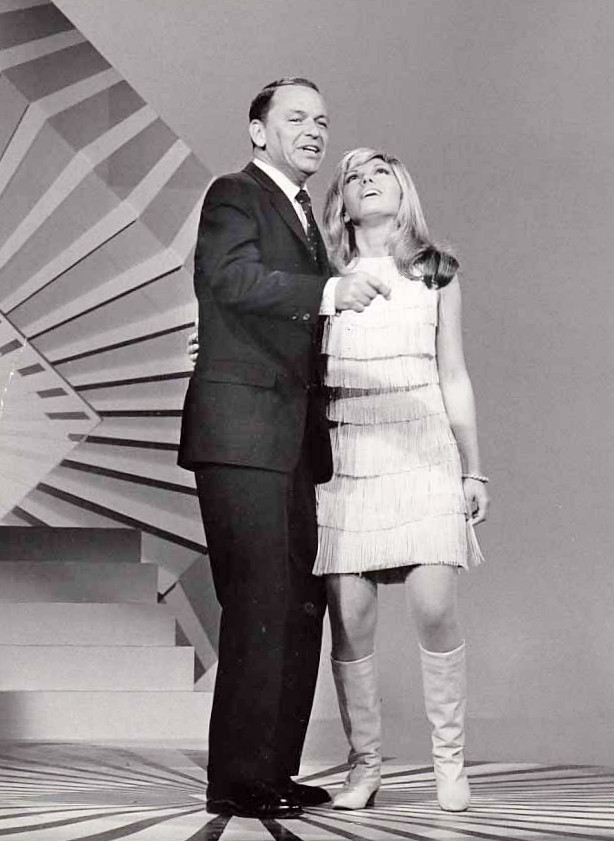
- Frank Sinatra and Nancy Sinatra
- Written by: Sheldon Keller; Glenn Wheaton
- Directed by: Dwight Hemion
- Starring: Frank Sinatra; Nancy Sinatra

Production
- Producers: Dwight Hemion; Carolyn Raskin
- Running time: 50 minutes

Original release
- Network: NBC
- Release: December 7, 1966

Related
- Frank Sinatra: A Man and His Music; A Man and His Music + Ella + Jobim

A Man and His Music – Part II is a 1966 television special starring Frank Sinatra, accompanied by the orchestras of Nelson Riddle and Gordon Jenkins, and also featuring Nancy Sinatra.

It was the sequel to the previous years special A Man and His Music. It was followed up by A Man and His Music + Ella + Jobim in 1967.

== Tracks ==
1. "Fly Me to the Moon"
2. "The Most Beautiful Girl in the World"
3. "Moonlight In Vermont"
4. "You're Nobody 'til Somebody Loves You"
5. Nancy Sinatra: "Bang Bang (My Baby Shot Me Down)"
6. Nancy Sinatra: "On Broadway"
7. Duet with Nancy: "Yes Sir, That's My Baby"
8. Duet Medley with Nancy: "Downtown"/"These Boots Are Made for Walkin'"
9. Medley: "Just One of Those Things"/"My Heart Stood Still"/"But Beautiful"/"When Your Lover Has Gone"
10. "Luck Be a Lady"
11. "That's Life"
12. "Granada"
13. "My Kind of Town"
14. "Put Your Dreams Away (For Another Day)"
