= Michael Stevens (producer) =

American film director (1966–2015)

- Born: November 21, 1966; Washington, D.C., U.S.
- Died: October 15, 2015 (aged 48); Los Angeles, California, U.S.
- Occupations: Producer; writer; director
- Spouse: Ali Gifford
- Children: 2

Michael Morrow Stevens (November 21, 1966 – October 15, 2015) was an American producer, writer, and director who won seven Emmy Awards.

Starting in 2002, he was the writer and producer of the annual Kennedy Center Honors. His productions of the TV special of the Honors event secured the show an Emmy Award nomination for Outstanding Variety, Music Or Comedy Special in five consecutive years – 2007, 2008, 2009, 2010 and 2011 – winning the award in the latter three years.

His other work included writing and/or producing and/or directing many live events and TV productions including multiple productions of the annual Christmas in Washington TV special, several presentations of the AFI's The American Film Institute Salutes… specials and HBO's inaugural celebration in 2009 for President Barack Obama.

== Personal life and education ==
Stevens was born in Washington, D.C., into an entertainment industry family. His paternal grandfather was film director George Stevens. His father George Stevens Jr. is a producer who created the American Film Institute. Other family members include actors Alice Howell and Yvonne Howell and the theatre critic Ashton Stevens.

He was educated at the Landon School in Washington, D.C., graduating in 1985 and subsequently at Duke University receiving a Bachelor of Arts degree in English Literature and Political Science in 1989. Stevens lived in Los Angeles with his producer wife Alexandra known professionally as Ali Gifford and their two children.

Stevens died on October 15, 2015, of stomach cancer in Los Angeles.

== Dramatic film productions ==
In addition to his work on live events, concerts and awards shows for television, Stevens has been involved in several dramatic films as director and producer. These include the feature films Sin starring Gary Oldman and Ving Rhames and Bad City Blues featuring Dennis Hopper, Michael Massee and Michael McGrady and the television adaptation of the Broadway play, Thurgood starring Laurence Fishburne, which he directed and produced for HBO.

== Music productions ==
An integral element of Stevens' work on the Kennedy Centers Honors shows since 2003 has been producing segments saluting musician honorees such as Bob Dylan, Bruce Springsteen, the Who and Paul McCartney that feature performances by musicians including Sting, Eddie Vedder, Jennifer Hudson, Dave Grohl, Norah Jones and James Taylor. Stevens' production work for the annual Christmas in Washington TV specials since 1993 has featured a large number of prominent musicians.

In 2010, Stevens conceived and produced the Bettye LaVette album The British Rock Songbook that was nominated for a Grammy Award for Outstanding Contemporary Blues album in 2011.
