= Frank Sinatra: A Man and His Music =

- Directed by: Dwight Hemion
- Starring: Frank Sinatra

Production
- Running time: 60 minutes

Original release
- Network: NBC
- Release: November 24, 1965

Related
- A Man and His Music – Part II

Frank Sinatra: A Man and His Music is a one-hour television special in color, first broadcast by NBC on November 24, 1965, to mark the occasion of Frank Sinatra's 50th birthday. It was directed by the multi-Emmy-winning Dwight Hemion. Frank Peppiatt and John Aylesworth were the head writers. Telecast at a time when television had just switched to full-time color programming (except for feature films shot in black-and-white), the show was an enormous success, so much so that it spawned two follow-ups: A Man and His Music – Part II (1966), featuring Nancy Sinatra, and A Man and His Music + Ella + Jobim (1967), starring Ella Fitzgerald and Antônio Carlos Jobim. An album by Sinatra, also titled A Man and His Music, was released at around the same time as the special.

== Format ==
By modern standards, especially, the format of the original show was profoundly simple. It consisted only of Frank Sinatra in a television studio singing many of his hit tunes (such as "It Was a Very Good Year") in front of a live audience. There were no guests on this first program. The orchestra was conducted by long-time Sinatra arrangers Nelson Riddle and Gordon Jenkins, and Ed McMahon served as announcer, a role he returned to in the two subsequent specials.

== Production ==
Frank Sinatra: A Man and His Music was shot inside NBC's Studio 1, at its color television facility in Burbank, California. The special was taped in segments on at least two nights in November 1965. Sinatra was suffering from a cold at the time, which limited his time in front of the microphone. He coughs and clears his throat a few times during the show. Writer Gay Talese documented both nights of taping in his April 1966 Esquire magazine profile, "Frank Sinatra Has a Cold".

Budweiser served as network sponsor.

== Awards ==
The special won an Emmy Award for Outstanding Music Program, and a Peabody Award. It was also nominated for two other Emmys, as well as a Golden Globe.

== Revival ==
Turner Classic Movies rebroadcast the special for the first time in many years, on the evening of May 14, 2008, as part of their month-long commemoration of the tenth anniversary of Sinatra's death.

== DVD ==
The show has been available on DVD since 1999. However, there is also a 1981 special on DVD, the similarly titled Sinatra: The Man and His Music, which is sometimes confused with the earlier program, not only because of the title, but because the keep-case is almost identical.

== Tracks ==
1. "I've Got You Under My Skin"
2. "Without a Song"
3. "Don't Worry 'bout Me"
4. "I Get a Kick Out of You"
5. "Nancy (With the Laughing Face)"
6. "My Kind of Town"
7. Medley: "It Was a Very Good Year"/"Young at Heart"/"The Girl Next Door"/"Last Night When We Were Young"
8. "This Is All I Ask"
9. "Come Fly with Me"
10. "The Lady Is a Tramp"
11. "I've Got the World on a String"
12. "Witchcraft"
13. "You Make Me Feel So Young"
14. "Put Your Dreams Away (For Another Day)"
