= Kimber Rickabaugh =

American television producer

Kimber Rickabaugh is a producer with RickMill Productions (founded 1991). Along with her partner Paul Miller, Rickabaugh is responsible for television shows for Comedy Central, HBO and other networks.

== Life ==
After starting at NBC in New York, she next was under contract with Dick Clark Productions until she went freelance as a producer in 1986, where she produced HBO's first LIVE Comedy Special. In 1986, she married Gene Crowe, a technical director and design engineer and co-owner of Greene Crowe & Co. Rickabaugh and Crowe have worked together a few times on shows such as George Lopez, The Whoopi Goldberg Show, and The Earth Day Special. Rickabaugh formed RickMill Productions in 1991 with Paul Miller, who also directs, and the team continues to be active producers of comedy and variety series and specials. Some of her productions include: all George Carlin HBO specials, for Dave Chappelle, Whoopi Goldberg, Howie Mandel, Lewis Black, MTV and multiple yearly specials and series. RickMill Productions produced 15 seasons of "Comedy Central Presents" series.

RickMill also has an ongoing relationship with Kathy Griffin, starting in 2010 when producing all her stand-up specials for BRAVO, where Griffin set an unprecedented feat of 4 one-hour specials in 2011. RickMill produced all of Griffin's specials in 2012 and 2013, where Kathy set a new record for the most televised comedy specials surpassing George Carlin's record. Kimber retired in 2012.
