= Roy Somlyo =

American theatre producer

- Born: September 2, 1925; Detroit, Michigan, USA
- Died: January 29, 2009 (aged 83); Manhattan, New York City, New York, USA
- Occupation(s): Theater producer and manager

Roy A. Somlyo (September 2, 1925 – January 29, 2009) was a prolific producer and manager of theater productions on Broadway, London, and on tours around the world.

He had production roles in the telecast of the annual Tony Awards for fourteen years, winning four Emmy Awards and garnering three more nominations. At one time he lived with Marlon Brando.
