= Sick and Tired (2006) =

Sick and Tired is a stand-up comedy special written and performed by actress and comedian Wanda Sykes. The show premiered on October 14, 2006 on HBO. It is directed by Michael Drumm and was filmed in front of a live audience at the Moore Theatre in Seattle, WA. The show was nominated for the 2007 Emmy Award for Outstanding Variety, Music or Comedy Special. According to Linda Mizejewski, a Women, Gender and Sexuality Studies professor at Ohio State University, in her book, Pretty/Funny: Women Comedians and Body Politics, the title of the special refers to the quote by Fannie Lou Hamer, "I am sick and tired of being sick and tired."

== Plot ==
Sykes begins her performance by sharing two anecdotes, the first about a surprising interaction with a fan and the second about a talkative child whom she was seated next to on a flight. Sykes then talks about American Idol, which she applauds for its meanness in making eliminated contestants sing before they are told to go home. Next, she addresses the joys of being a pet owner, mentioning her dog Riley. She talks about her love and respect for animals and expresses that she doesn’t understand how people can be cruel towards them. Keeping with the theme of animals, Sykes moves on to describe her experience swimming with a dolphin that who is supposed to be racist. Sykes’ next topic is money. She shares her misgivings about investing in stocks, comments on the national deficit, and criticizes the spending of government money on a space program. Sykes criticizes President George W. Bush’s foreign policy, his administration, and politicians in general. She talks about the adverse effects of politics on the elderly and women, addressing such issues as Medicaid and abortion. This discussion leads into a conversation about pornography which segues into a discourse on same-sex marriage. Sykes then talks about racial profiling and the ways in which people are treated differently depending on their race. She comments on prostitution and the objectification of women. Sykes wraps up her special by discussing her new-found sense of apathy and how it has affected her sex life.
