= 52nd Primetime Emmy Awards =

2000 American television programming awards

- Promotional poster
- Date: September 10, 2000 (Ceremony); August 26, 2000 (Creative Arts Awards)
- Location: Shrine Auditorium, Los Angeles, California
- Presented by: Academy of Television Arts & Sciences
- Hosted by: Garry Shandling

Highlights
- Most awards: The West Wing (5)
- Most nominations: The Sopranos (10)
- Outstanding Comedy Series: Will & Grace
- Outstanding Drama Series: The West Wing
- Outstanding Miniseries: The Corner
- Outstanding Variety, Music or Comedy Series: Late Show with David Letterman

Television/radio coverage
- Network: ABC
- Produced by: Richard Zanuck; Lili Fini Zanuck

The 52nd Primetime Emmy Awards were held on Sunday, September 10, 2000. The ceremony was hosted by Garry Shandling and was broadcast on ABC. Networks Bravo and The WB received their first major nominations. The nominations were announced on July 20, 2000. 27 awards were presented.

For its second season, Will & Grace led all comedy series with three major wins, including Outstanding Comedy Series; Ally McBeal became the first defending champion, that wasn't canceled or ended, that failed to be nominated for Outstanding Comedy Series since Get Smart in 1970.

The drama field was dominated by first year series The West Wing. In addition to winning Outstanding Drama Series, the series won five major awards total, leading all series. Overall, when adding The West Wing's technical categories, it won nine awards in a single year, a record that stood until Game of Thrones received twelve awards for its fifth season in 2015. In addition, James Gandolfini became the first actor from an HBO series to win Outstanding Lead Actor in a Drama Series for The Sopranos; Gandolfini would win twice more over the next three years.

== Winners and nominees ==
Winners are listed first, highlighted in boldface, and indicated with a double dagger (‡). (Note: The outlets listed for each program are the U.S. broadcasters or streaming services identified in the nominations, which for some international productions are different from the broadcaster(s) that originally commissioned the program.) For simplicity, producers who received nominations for program awards have been omitted.

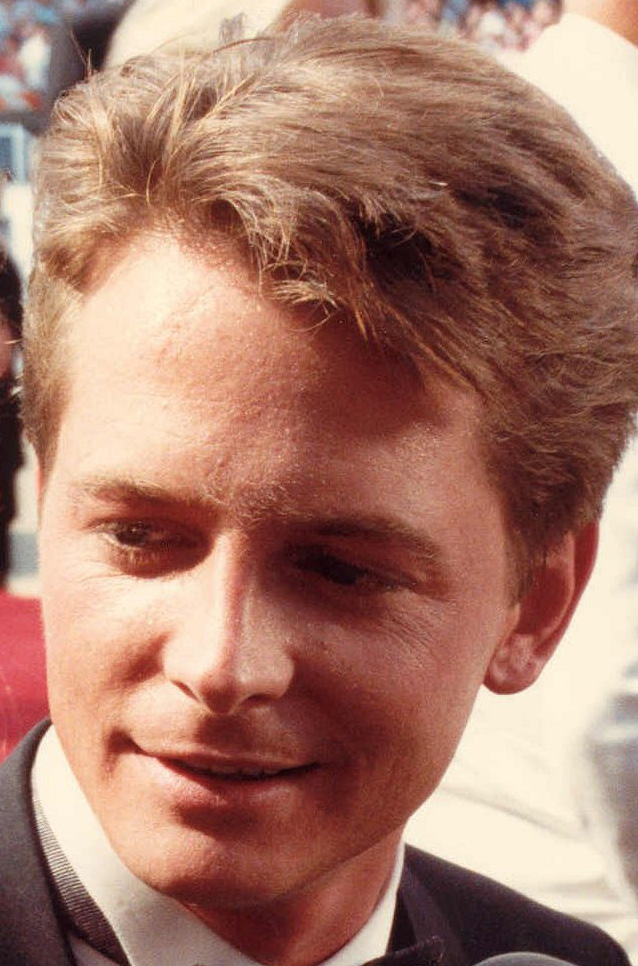
Michael J. Fox, Outstanding Lead Actor in a Comedy Series winner

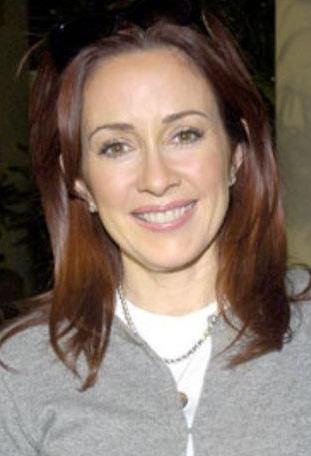
Patricia Heaton, Outstanding Lead Actress in a Comedy Series winner

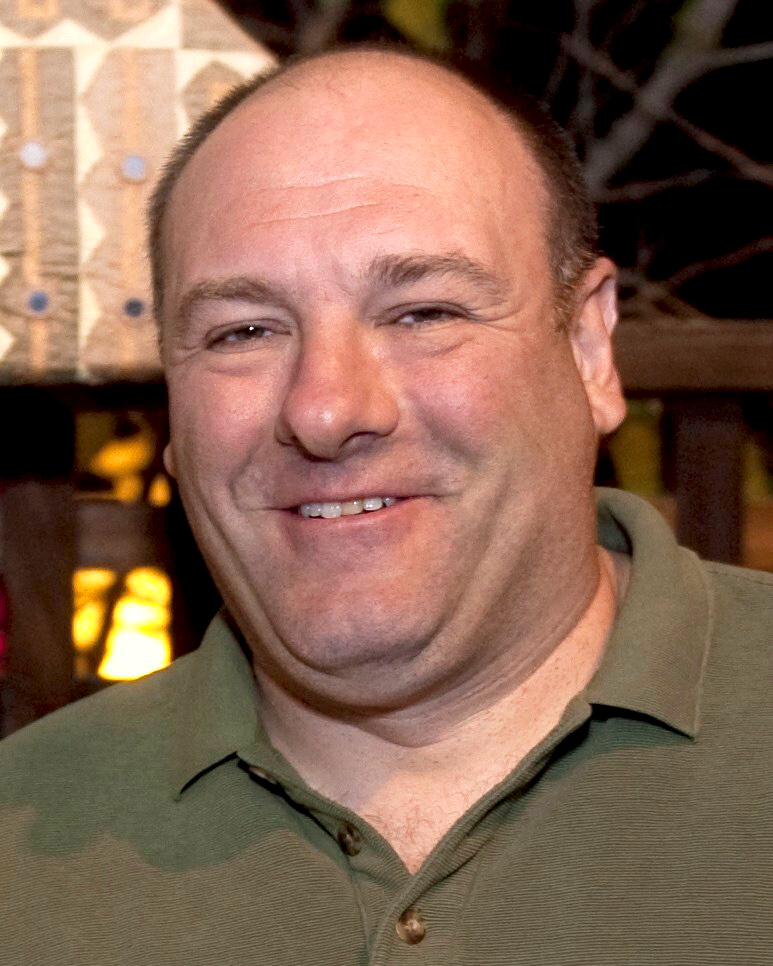
James Gandolfini, Outstanding Lead Actor in a Drama Series winner

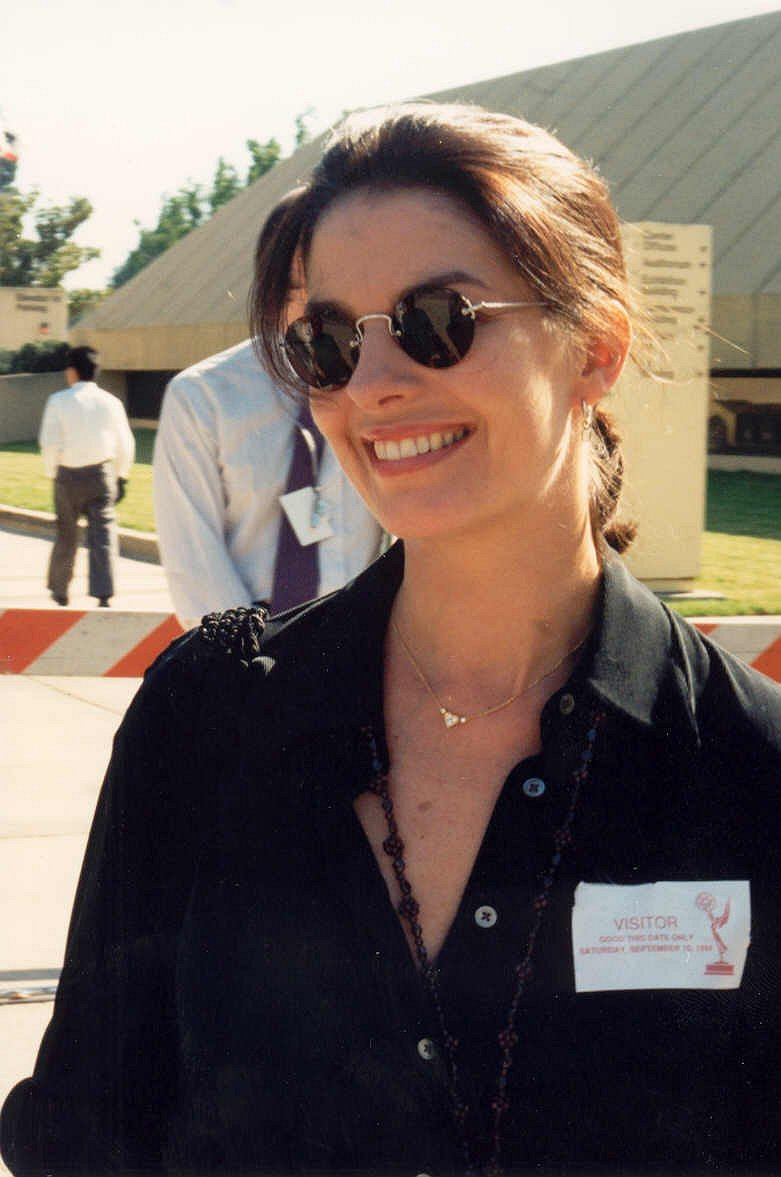
Sela Ward, Outstanding Lead Actress in a Drama Series winner

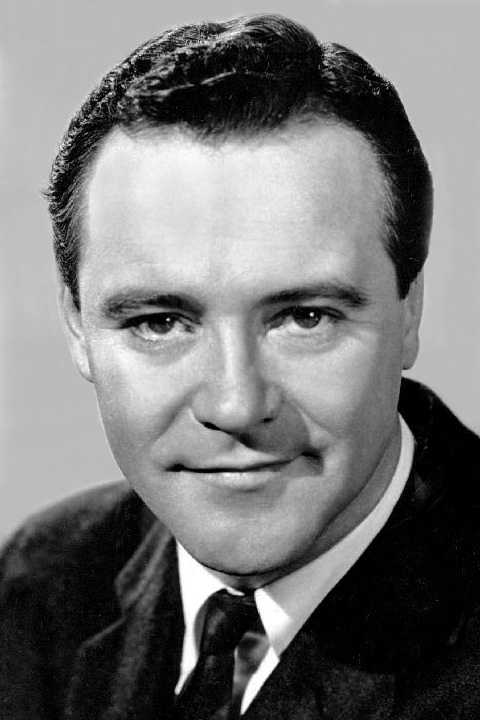
Jack Lemmon, Outstanding Lead Actor in a Miniseries or Movie winner

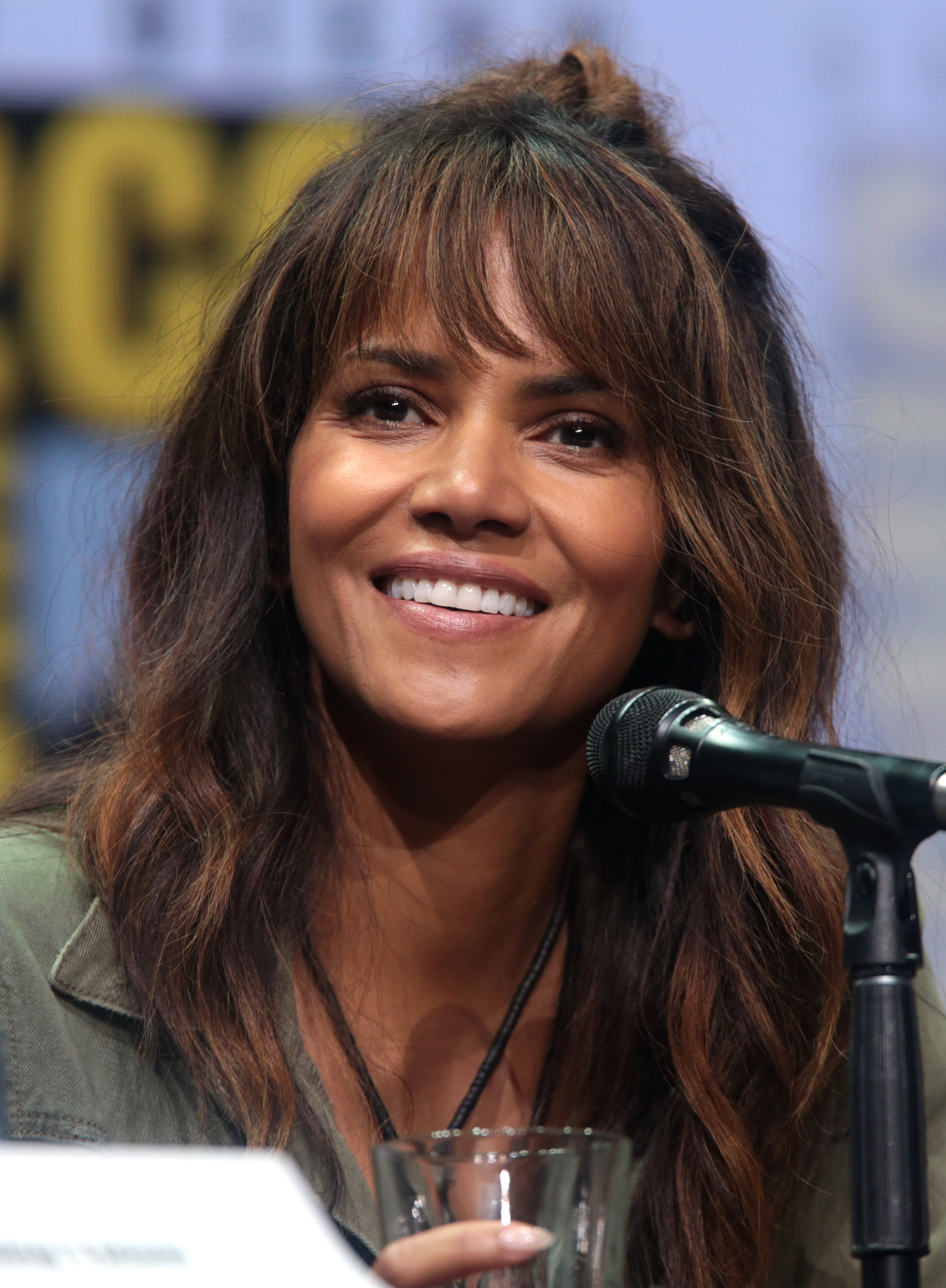
Halle Berry, Outstanding Lead Actress in a Miniseries or Movie winner

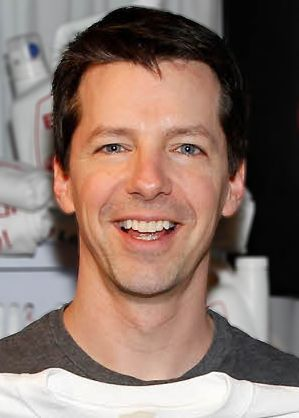
Sean Hayes, Outstanding Supporting Actor in a Comedy Series winner

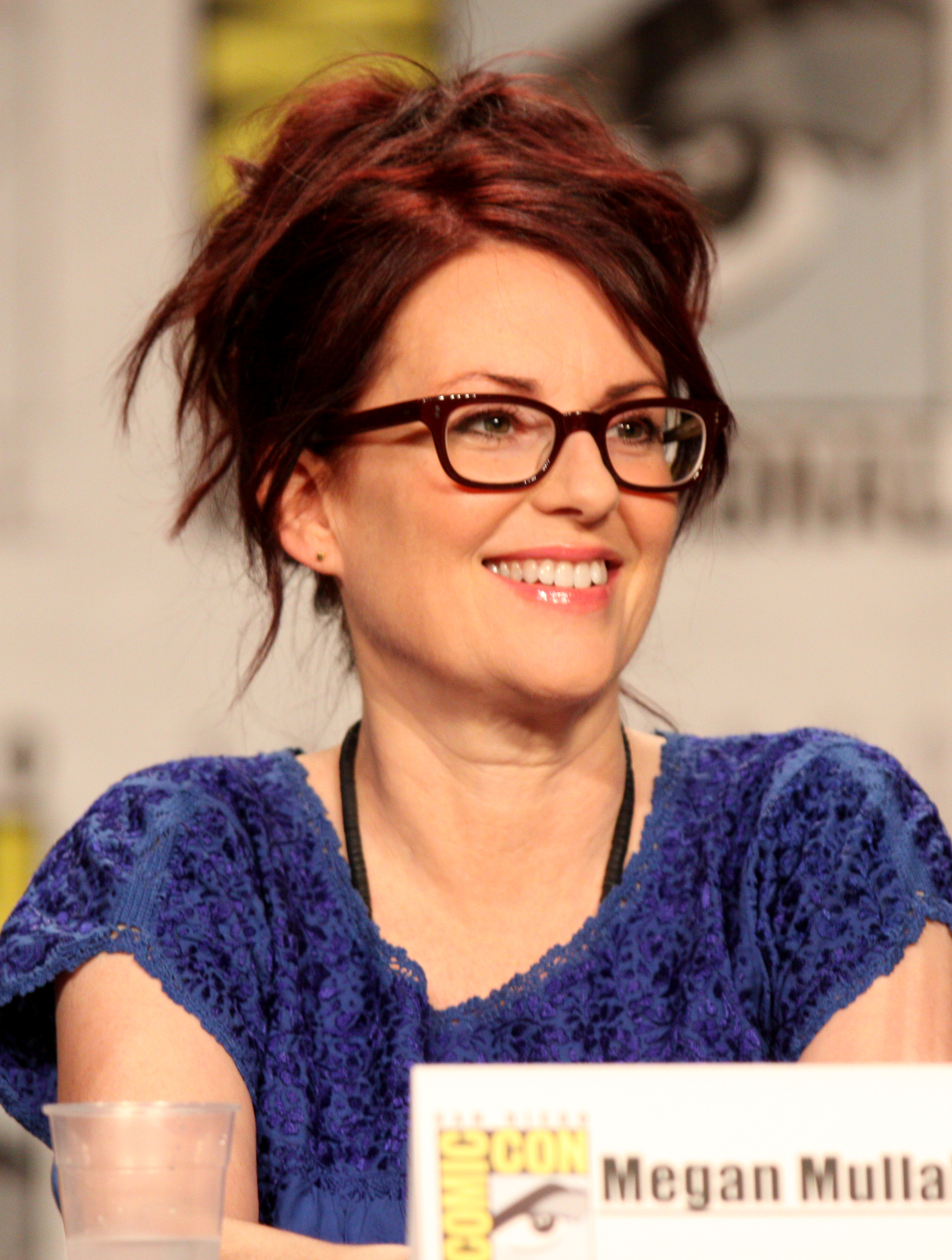
Megan Mullally, Outstanding Supporting Actress in a Comedy Series winner

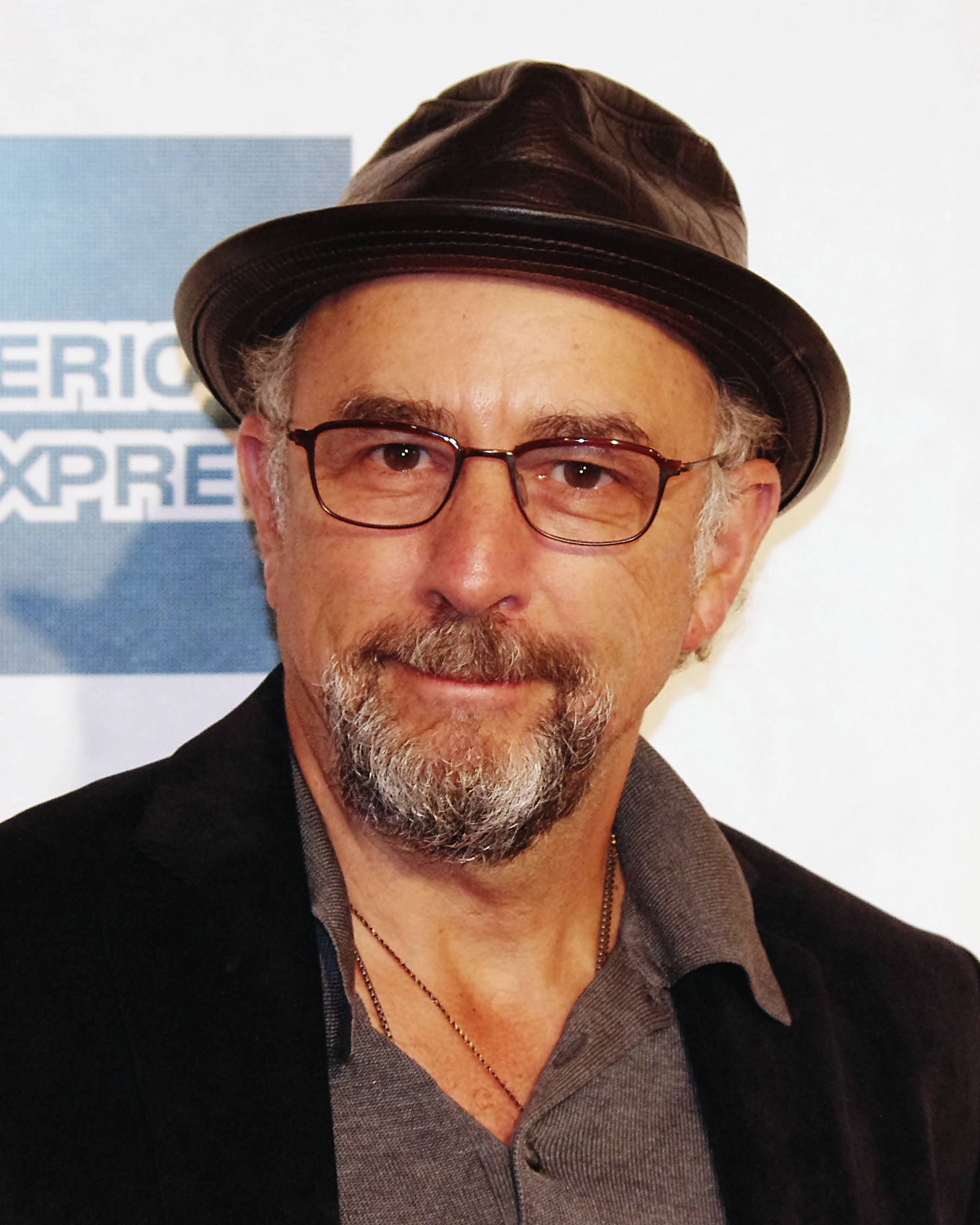
Richard Schiff, Outstanding Supporting Actor in a Drama Series winner

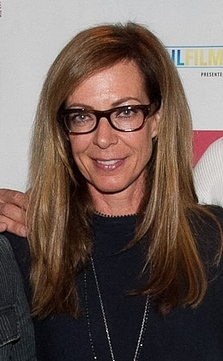
Allison Janney, Outstanding Supporting Actress in a Drama Series winner

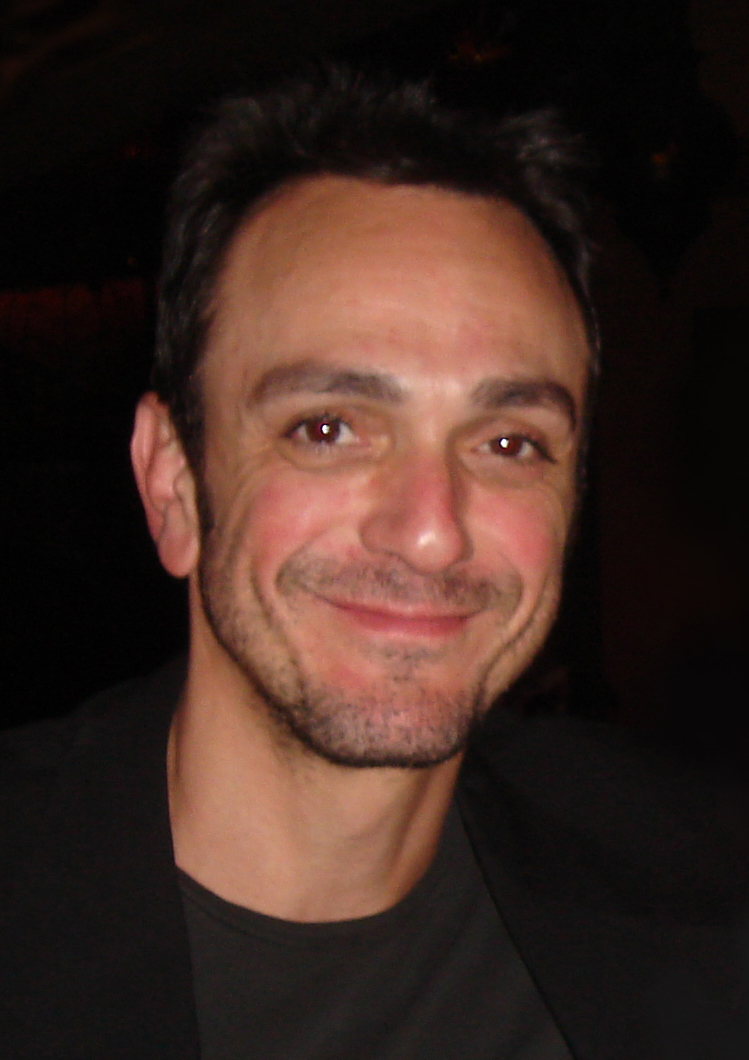
Hank Azaria, Outstanding Supporting Actor in a Miniseries or Movie winner

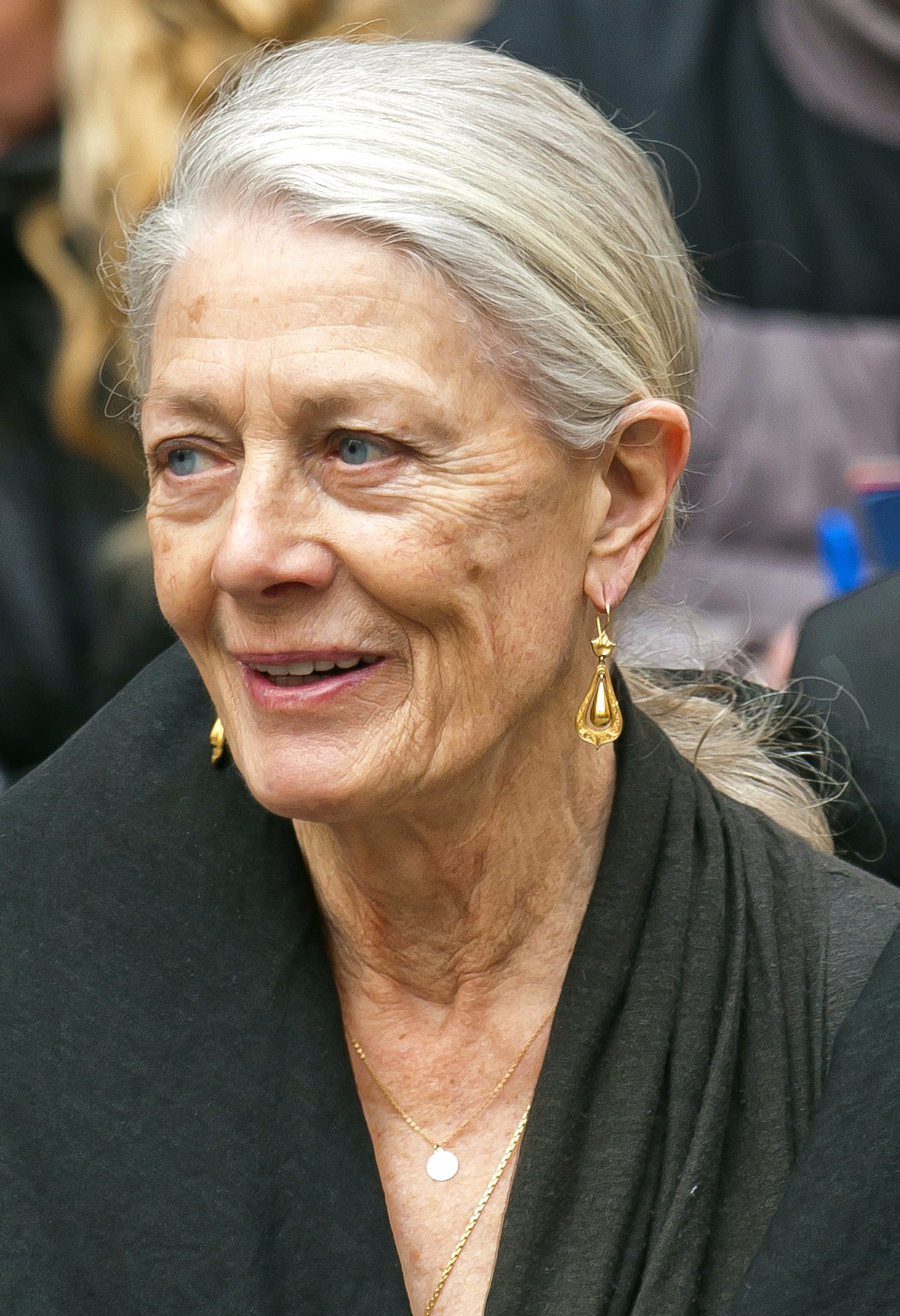
Vanessa Redgrave, Outstanding Supporting Actress in a Miniseries or Movie winner

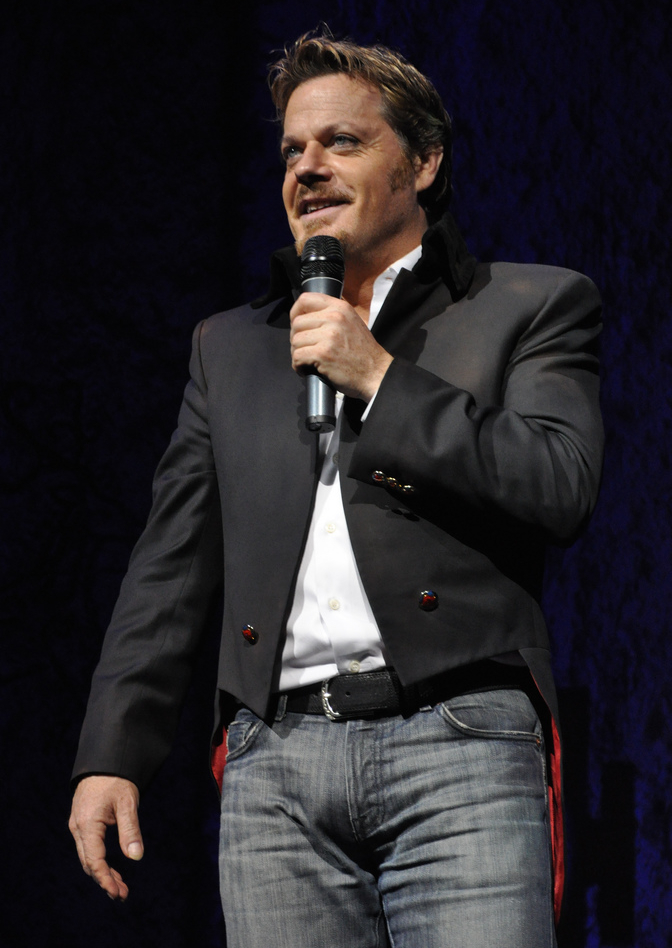
Eddie Izzard, Outstanding Individual Performance in a Variety or Music Program winner

=== Programs ===
Programs
**Outstanding Comedy Series**: **Will & Grace (NBC)**‡; Everybody Loves Raymond (CBS); Frasier (NBC); Friends (NBC); Sex and the City (HBO)	**Outstanding Drama Series**: **The West Wing (NBC)**‡; ER (NBC); Law & Order (NBC); The Practice (ABC); The Sopranos (HBO)
**Outstanding Variety, Music, or Comedy Series**: **Late Show with David Letterman (CBS)**‡; The Chris Rock Show (HBO); Dennis Miller Live (HBO); Politically Incorrect with Bill Maher (ABC); The Tonight Show with Jay Leno (NBC)	**Outstanding Variety, Music, or Comedy Special**: **Saturday Night Live: The 25th Anniversary Special (NBC)**‡; 72nd Annual Academy Awards (ABC); Chris Rock: Bigger & Blacker (HBO); Cirque du Soleil – Quidam (Bravo); Eddie Izzard: Dress to Kill (HBO)
**Outstanding Made for Television Movie**: **Oprah Winfrey Presents: Tuesdays with Morrie (ABC)**‡; Annie (ABC); If These Walls Could Talk 2 (HBO); Introducing Dorothy Dandridge (HBO); RKO 281 (HBO)	**Outstanding Miniseries**: **The Corner (HBO)**‡; Arabian Nights (ABC); The Beach Boys: An American Family (ABC); Jesus (CBS); P. T. Barnum (A&E)

=== Acting ===
==== Lead performances ====
Lead performances
**Outstanding Lead Actor in a Comedy Series**: **Michael J. Fox – Spin City as Michael Flaherty (ABC)**‡; Kelsey Grammer – Frasier as Dr. Frasier Crane (NBC); John Lithgow – 3rd Rock from the Sun as Dick Solomon (NBC); Eric McCormack – Will & Grace as Will Truman (NBC); Ray Romano – Everybody Loves Raymond as Ray Barone (CBS) (Episode: "Bad Moon Rising")	**Outstanding Lead Actress in a Comedy Series**: **Patricia Heaton – Everybody Loves Raymond as Debra Barone (CBS) (Episode: “Bad Moon Rising”)**‡; Jenna Elfman – Dharma & Greg as Dharma Montgomery (ABC); Jane Kaczmarek – Malcolm in the Middle as Lois (Fox) (Episode: “Red Dress”); Debra Messing – Will & Grace as Grace Adler (NBC); Sarah Jessica Parker – Sex and the City as Carrie Bradshaw (HBO)
**Outstanding Lead Actor in a Drama Series**: **James Gandolfini – The Sopranos as Tony Soprano (HBO)**‡; Dennis Franz – NYPD Blue as Detective Andy Sipowicz (ABC); Jerry Orbach – Law & Order as Detective Lennie Briscoe (NBC); Martin Sheen – The West Wing as President Josiah Bartlet (NBC); Sam Waterston – Law & Order as Asst. DA Jack McCoy (NBC)	**Outstanding Lead Actress in a Drama Series**: **Sela Ward – Once and Again as Lily Manning (ABC)**‡; Lorraine Bracco – The Sopranos as Dr. Jennifer Melfi (HBO); Amy Brenneman – Judging Amy as Judge Amy Gray (CBS); Edie Falco – The Sopranos as Carmela Soprano (HBO); Julianna Margulies – ER as Head Nurse Carol Hathaway (NBC)
**Outstanding Lead Actor in a Miniseries or Movie**: **Jack Lemmon – Oprah Winfrey Presents: Tuesdays with Morrie as Morrie Schwartz (ABC)**‡; Beau Bridges – P. T. Barnum as P. T. Barnum (A&E); Brian Dennehy – Arthur Miller's Death of a Salesman as Willy Loman (Showtime); William H. Macy – A Slight Case of Murder as Terry Thorpe (TNT); Liev Schreiber – RKO 281 as Orson Welles (HBO)	**Outstanding Lead Actress in a Miniseries or Movie**: **Halle Berry – Introducing Dorothy Dandridge as Dorothy Dandridge (HBO)**‡; Judy Davis – A Cooler Climate as Paula Tanner (Showtime); Sally Field – A Cooler Climate as Iris Prue (Showtime); Holly Hunter – Harlan County War as Ruby Kincaid (Showtime); Gena Rowlands – The Color of Love: Jacey's Story as Georgia Porter (CBS)
**Outstanding Individual Performance in a Variety or Music Program**: **Eddie Izzard – Eddie Izzard: Dress to Kill (HBO)**‡; Cher – Cher: Live in Concert – From the MGM Grand in Las Vegas (HBO); Billy Crystal – 72nd Annual Academy Awards (ABC); Chris Rock – Chris Rock: Bigger & Blacker (HBO); Molly Shannon – Saturday Night Live (NBC)

==== Supporting performances ====
Supporting performances
**Outstanding Supporting Actor in a Comedy Series**: **Sean Hayes – Will & Grace as Jack McFarland (NBC)**‡; Peter Boyle – Everybody Loves Raymond as Frank Barone (CBS) (Episodes: “Prodigal Son” and “Debra Makes Something Good”); Brad Garrett – Everybody Loves Raymond as Robert Barone (CBS) (Episodes: “Someone’s Cranky” and “Confronting the Attacker”); Peter MacNicol – Ally McBeal as John Cage (Fox); David Hyde Pierce – Frasier as Dr. Niles Crane (NBC)	**Outstanding Supporting Actress in a Comedy Series**: **Megan Mullally – Will & Grace as Karen Walker (NBC)**‡; Jennifer Aniston – Friends as Rachel Green (NBC); Kim Cattrall – Sex and the City as Samantha Jones (HBO); Lisa Kudrow – Friends as Phoebe Buffay (NBC); Doris Roberts – Everybody Loves Raymond as Marie Barone (CBS) (Episodes: “Sex Talk” and “Robert’s Divorce”)
**Outstanding Supporting Actor in a Drama Series**: **Richard Schiff – The West Wing as Toby Ziegler (NBC)**‡; Michael Badalucco – The Practice as Jimmy Berluti (ABC); Dominic Chianese – The Sopranos as Corrado "Uncle Junior" Soprano (HBO); Steve Harris – The Practice as Eugene Young (ABC); John Spencer – The West Wing as Leo McGarry (NBC)	**Outstanding Supporting Actress in a Drama Series**: **Allison Janney – The West Wing as C. J. Cregg (NBC)**‡; Stockard Channing – The West Wing as Abigail Bartlet, M.D. (NBC); Tyne Daly – Judging Amy as Maxine Gray (CBS); Nancy Marchand – The Sopranos as Livia Soprano (HBO); Holland Taylor – The Practice as Judge Roberta Kittleson (ABC)
**Outstanding Supporting Actor in a Miniseries or Movie**: **Hank Azaria – Oprah Winfrey Presents: Tuesdays with Morrie as Mitch Albom (ABC)**‡; Klaus Maria Brandauer – Introducing Dorothy Dandridge as Otto Preminger (HBO); James Cromwell – RKO 281 as William Randolph Hearst (HBO); Danny Glover – Freedom Song as Will Walker (TNT); John Malkovich – RKO 281 as Herman Mankiewicz (HBO)	**Outstanding Supporting Actress in a Miniseries or Movie**: **Vanessa Redgrave – If These Walls Could Talk 2 as Edith Tree (HBO)**‡; Kathy Bates – Annie as Miss Hannigan (ABC); Elizabeth Franz – Arthur Miller's Death of a Salesman as Linda Loman (Showtime); Melanie Griffith – RKO 281 as Marion Davies (HBO); Maggie Smith – David Copperfield (ExxonMobil Masterpiece Theatre) as Betsey Trotwood (PBS)

=== Directing ===
Directing
**Outstanding Directing for a Comedy Series**: **Malcolm in the Middle: "Pilot" – Todd Holland (Fox)**‡; Ally McBeal: "Ally McBeal: The Musical, Almost" – Bill D'Elia (Fox); Everybody Loves Raymond: "The Christmas Picture" – Will Mackenzie (CBS); Friends: "The One That Could Have Been, Parts 1 & 2" – Michael Lembeck (NBC); Sports Night: "Quo Vadimus" – Thomas Schlamme (ABC); Will & Grace: "Homo for the Holidays" – James Burrows (NBC)	**Outstanding Directing for a Drama Series**: **The West Wing: "Pilot" – Thomas Schlamme (NBC)**‡; ER: "All in the Family" – Jonathan Kaplan (NBC); ER: "Such Sweet Sorrow" – John Wells (NBC); The Sopranos: "Funhouse" – John Patterson (HBO); The Sopranos: "The Knight in White Satin Armor" – Allen Coulter (HBO)
**Outstanding Directing for a Variety or Music Program**: **72nd Annual Academy Awards – Louis J. Horvitz (ABC)**‡; Chris Rock: Bigger & Blacker – Keith Truesdell (HBO); The Gershwins' "Crazy for You" (Great Performances) – Matthew Diamond (PBS); Late Show with David Letterman: "Show #1294" – Jerry Foley (CBS); Saturday Night Live: The 25th Anniversary Special – Beth McCarthy-Miller (NBC); The Tonight Show with Jay Leno: "Show #1770" – Ellen Brown (NBC)	**Outstanding Directing for a Miniseries or Movie**: **The Corner – Charles S. Dutton (HBO)**‡; Introducing Dorothy Dandridge – Martha Coolidge (HBO); Annie – Rob Marshall (ABC); Fail Safe – Martin A. Pasetta Jr. and Stephen Frears (CBS); RKO 281 – Benjamin Ross (HBO)

=== Writing ===
Writing
**Outstanding Writing for a Comedy Series**: **Malcolm in the Middle: "Pilot" – Linwood Boomer (Fox)**‡; Everybody Loves Raymond: "Bad Moon Rising" – Ray Romano and Philip Rosenthal (CBS); Frasier: "Something Borrowed, Someone Blue" – Christopher Lloyd and Joe Keenan (NBC); Freaks and Geeks: "Pilot" – Paul Feig (NBC); Sex and the City: "Evolution" – Cindy Chupack (HBO); Sex and the City: "Ex and the City" – Michael Patrick King (HBO)	**Outstanding Writing for a Drama Series**: **The West Wing: "In Excelsis Deo" – Aaron Sorkin and Rick Cleveland (NBC)**‡; Buffy the Vampire Slayer: "Hush" – Joss Whedon (The WB); The Sopranos: "Funhouse" – David Chase and Todd A. Kessler (HBO); The Sopranos: "The Knight in White Satin Armor" – Robin Green and Mitchell Burgess (HBO); The West Wing: "Pilot" – Aaron Sorkin (NBC)
**Outstanding Writing for a Variety or Music Program**: **Eddie Izzard: Dress to Kill – Eddie Izzard (HBO)**‡; Chris Rock: Bigger & Blacker – Chris Rock (HBO); The Chris Rock Show – Tom Agna, Vernon Chatman, Louis C.K., Lance Crouther, Nick Di Paolo, Ali LeRoi, Steve O'Donnell, Chris Rock, Chuck Sklar, Jeff Stilson, Halsted Sullivan, Wanda Sykes, and Mike Upchurch (HBO); Late Night with Conan O'Brien – Jonathan Groff, Chris Albers, Ellie Barancik, Andy Blitz, Louis C.K., Janine Ditullio, Jon Glaser, Michael Gordon, Roy Jenkins, Brian Kiley, Brian McCann, Conan O'Brien, Andy Richter, Robert Smigel, Brian Stack, and Mike Sweeney (NBC); Late Show with David Letterman – Rodney Rothman, Gabe Abelson, Michael Barrie, Carter L. Bays, Jon Beckerman, Rob Burnett, Chris Harris, David Letterman, Gerard Mulligan, Jim Mulholland, Tom Ruprecht, Bill Scheft, Beth Sherman, Eric Stangel, Justin Stangel, Craig Thomas, Joe Toplyn, and Steve Young (CBS)	**Outstanding Writing for a Miniseries or Movie**: **The Corner – David Simon and David Mills (HBO)**‡; Cheaters – John Stockwell (HBO); Homicide: The Movie – Eric Overmyer, James Yoshimura, and Tom Fontana (NBC); If These Walls Could Talk 2: "1961" – Jane Anderson (HBO); RKO 281 – John Logan (HBO)

== Most major nominations ==
Networks with multiple major nominations (Note: "Major" constitutes the categories listed above: Program, Acting, Directing, and Writing. Does not include the technical categories.)
Network	No. of Nominations
NBC	47
HBO	41
ABC	26
CBS	18

Programs with multiple major nominations
Program	Category	Network	No. of Nominations
The Sopranos	Drama	HBO	10
The West Wing	Drama	NBC	9
Everybody Loves Raymond	Comedy	CBS	8
RKO 281	Movie	HBO	7
Will & Grace	Comedy	NBC	6
Sex and the City	Comedy	HBO	5
Chris Rock: Bigger & Blacker	Variety	HBO	4
ER	Drama	NBC	4
Frasier	Comedy	NBC	4
Friends	Comedy	NBC	4
Introducing Dorothy Dandridge	Movie	HBO	4
The Practice	Drama	ABC	4
72nd Annual Academy Awards	Variety	ABC	3
Annie	Movie	ABC	3
The Corner	Miniseries	HBO	3
Eddie Izzard: Dress to Kill	Variety	HBO	3
If These Walls Could Talk 2	Movie	HBO	3
Late Show with David Letterman	Variety	CBS	3
Law & Order	Drama	NBC	3
Malcolm in the Middle	Comedy	Fox	3
Tuesdays with Morrie	Movie	ABC	3
Ally McBeal	Comedy	Fox	2
The Chris Rock Show	Variety	HBO	2
A Cooler Climate	Movie	Showtime	2
Death of a Salesman	Movie	Showtime	2
Judging Amy	Drama	CBS	2
P. T. Barnum	Miniseries	A&E	2
Saturday Night Live: The 25th Anniversary Special	Variety	NBC	2
The Tonight Show with Jay Leno	Variety	NBC	2

== Most major awards ==
Networks with multiple major awards
Network	No. of Awards
NBC	9
HBO	8
ABC	6
CBS	2
Fox	2

Programs with multiple major awards
Program	Category	Network	No. of Awards
The West Wing	Drama	NBC	5
The Corner	Miniseries	HBO	3
Tuesdays with Morrie	Movie	ABC	3
Will & Grace	Comedy	NBC	3
Eddie Izzard: Dress to Kill	Variety	HBO	2
Malcolm in the Middle	Comedy	Fox	2

== In Memoriam ==
- Loretta Young
- Douglas Fairbanks Jr.
- Madeline Kahn
- John Gielgud
- George C. Scott
- Larry Linville
- Meredith MacRae
- Gene Rayburn
- Durward Kirby
- Shirley Hemphill
- Hoyt Axton
- Nancy Marchand
- Leonard Goldenson
- Clayton Moore
- Doug Henning
- Craig Stevens
- Mary Jane Croft
- Mabel King
- Charles M. Schulz
- Alec Guinness
- Walter Matthau
