= Robert Lindblom Math & Science Academy =

Robert E. Lindblom Math & Science Academy
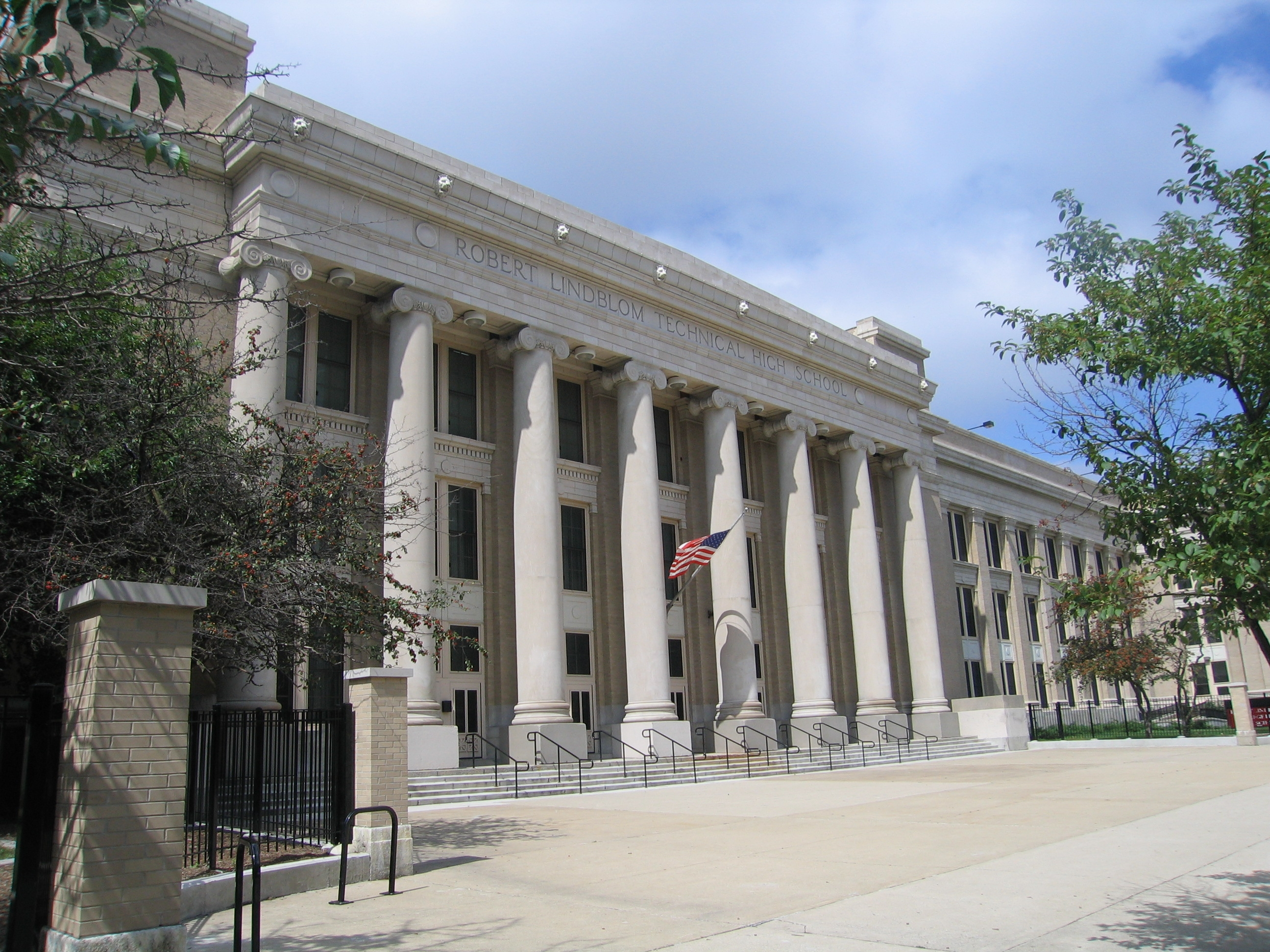

Location
- 6130 South. Wolcott Avenue; Chicago, Illinois 60636; United States; 41.7821°N 87.6721°W

Information
- School type: Public; Secondary; Selective Enrollment; Middle
- Motto: Our History Guides our Future.
- Established: 1917
- School district: Chicago Public Schools
- CEEB code: 141122
- Principal: Starlet E. Banks
- Grades: 7–12
- Gender: Coed
- Enrollment: 1,264 (2025–2026)
- Campus type: Urban
- Colors: Maroon; Gold
- Athletics conference: Chicago Public High School League
- Team name: Eagles
- Accreditation: North Central Association of Colleges and Schools
- Newspaper: The Talon
- Yearbook: The Eagle
- Website: lindblomeagles.org

Robert E. Lindblom Math & Science Academy High School (LMSA) (formerly known as Lindblom Technical High School and Lindblom College Prep High School) is a public 4–year selective enrollment high school and middle school located in the West Englewood neighborhood on the south side of Chicago, Illinois, United States. Lindblom is operated by the Chicago Public School system. The school originally constructed in 1919 is named for Robert E. Lindblom, a nineteenth-century Swedish–born trader on the Chicago Board of Trade.

Designated for students intended to enter vocations in industrial and skilled trades, it developed curricula to prepare students for college in the post-World War II era. In the early 1960s, Lindblom became one of the first selective enrollment high schools in Chicago Public Schools, predominately serving communities south of Roosevelt Road. Beginning in the 1999–2000 school year, the school was renamed as Lindblom College Prep High School. Following certain challenges with the turn of the millennium, the original site closed after the 2002–2003 school year. Students were housed in an elementary school located nearly 6.5 miles away in the Oakland community area for the next two years.

Lindblom reopened in 2005–2006, housing two student bodies for the College Prep's final senior class and the inaugural freshman class of the Math & Science Academy. The Chicago City Council approved the designation of the Lindblom building as a Chicago landmark by the Commission on Chicago Landmarks on June 9, 2010.

== History ==
Originally named the Robert E. Lindblom Technical High School, the three-story building was designed by architect Arthur Hussander and completed in 1919. Lindblom was designed in a Beaux-Arts style and has a neo-classical façade with Roman columns. The building contains a 2,000-seat auditorium (with two balconies), two gymnasiums, a large study hall/ballroom on the third floor with a barrel-vaulted ceiling and large skylights, a swimming pool, and a greenhouse.

It first served a population with a high number of European immigrants and emphasized the importance of education in assimilation and advancement. As the number of industrial jobs declined following World War II and the job market changed, the school curricula were changed to emphasize preparation for college, to enable students to obtain degrees needed for the changing market. The school was renamed as Lindblom College Prep High School in the 1999-2000 school year and has served the increasingly diverse student population in the late 2000s and beyond.

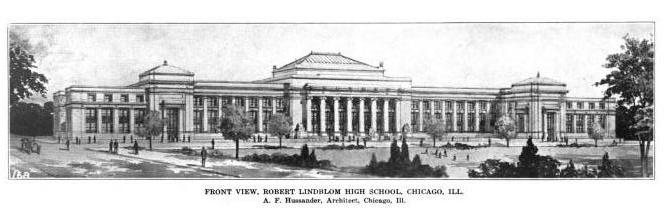
Architect's rendering of Lindblom, c. 1919.

In 2003, Lindblom underwent a two-year, $42 million renovation to upgrade systems and prepare the school as a site for concentration in math and science, as planned by the Chicago Public Schools. BauerLatoza Studio was hired to develop the entire project, which modernized the architecture, mechanical, electrical, and plumbing systems. BauerLatoza Studio also designed new computer and science labs that were installed throughout the building. The grand reopening was held by the Lindblom Alumni Association and the Board of Education on October 14, 2005. The occasion featured alumna Cheryl Burton, a prominent TV journalist in Chicago, as the mistress of ceremonies. The school reopened in the fall of 2005 as Lindblom Math & Science Academy. It welcomed its first class of freshmen and the final class of Lindblom College Prep High School graduated in the spring of 2006. Because of the poor reputation of the surrounding neighborhood, initially Lindblom Math & Science only had 25 prospective freshmen enrolled as of March 30, 2005, prior to its opening.

In December 2008, Lindblom received preliminary landmark status from the Commission on Chicago Landmarks. In June 2010, the Chicago City Council's Landmarks Committee approved the designation of the school as a city landmark, citing it as a "distinctive and exceptional example" of the Beaux Arts Style of architecture "with its monumental classical façade, light-colored masonry and symmetry."

== Curriculum ==
=== Schedule ===
Lindblom Math & Science Academy is on a block schedule. Students have four classes per day: Three that last 100 minutes; one that lasts 50, and one 50-minute lunch period. This allows students to focus on depth over breadth. 100-minute classes meet two days a week, and 50 minute classes meet four days a week. The school offers Advanced Placement (AP) courses, by which students can earn college credit after successful completion of the course and an AP exam at the end of the school year. Lindblom was the first high school in Chicago Public Schools to adopt a year round balanced schedule.

=== Academics ===
Lindblom is one of the ten selective enrollment schools in the city of Chicago. The school as a selective enrollment school offers only Honors and Advanced Placement level courses. Lindblom reestablished their academic center middle school in 2008, previously hosting grades seventh and eighth prior to its 2003 closure during most of the 1990s. Being one of only several other high schools in the city that offer an academic center in the high school building, the academic center students are commonly called as Ackies. The first graduating Ackie class will be in 2014, having spent five or six years at Lindblom.

=== Baxter International ===
In October 2008, Lindblom became partners with Baxter International as part of its SCIENCE@WORK initiative. Baxter donated money to the schools for science education. The objective of the Baxter Initiative is twofold. First, Baxter provides support for Lindblom's biotechnology courses. It also has contributed to the creation of the teacher professional development program, the Biotechnology Center of Excellence. Teachers from other Chicago high schools can attend professional development at Lindblom in order to create their own biotechnology programs. The initiative also provides support for Chicago's Renaissance 2010 program and the Illinois Institute of Technology's (IIT) Instructional Development System.

== Activities and athletics ==
Lindblom competes in the Chicago Public League (CPL) and also is a member of the Illinois High School Association (IHSA). Lindblom offers a wide variety of sports and extra curricular activities for its students to participate in including football, basketball, baseball, softball, soccer, water polo, wrestling, volleyball, cross country/track, swimming, golf, tennis and bowling. The Lindblom Debate Team competes in the flagship urban debate league called Chicago Debates (formerly the Chicago Debate League), an affiliate of National Association of Urban Debate Leagues (NAUDL), at both the high school and middle school levels. Established in the 1997-1998 academic year, Lindblom was one of the first five NAUDL debate programs in Chicago. In the 2008–2009 school year, LMSA started its first Girls' Swim Team and Boys' Swim Team. That same year, Lindblom started its Water Polo team.

== Notable alumni ==
- Cheryl Burton (1980) – an Emmy Award–winning television journalist for WLS-TV in Chicago.
- Shirley Coleman (1973) – politician, alderman, Chicago 16th ward (1991–2007).
- Lance Crouther (attended) – a writer and star of Chris Rock Show, noted for portraying the character Pootie Tang; wrote screenplay for documentary comedy Good Hair.
- Erik R. Fleming (1983) – member of the Mississippi House of Representatives from 72nd district.
- Chet Giermak (1945) – All-American collegiate basketball player at The College of William & Mary.
- Sonya Harper (1999) – member of the Illinois House of Representatives from 6th district.
- Steve "Silk" Hurley (1980) – Grammy Award–nominated house music pioneer, music producer, and DJ.
- Darold "Deevo" McCray (1984) - Guitarist with Sounds of Blackness and Commodores
- Andrea Jenkins (1979) – President of Minneapolis City Council, policy aide, transgender activist, and curator of the Transgender Oral History Project at the Jean-Nickolaus Tretter Collection in Gay, Lesbian, Bisexual and Transgender Studies
- Mickey Johnson (1970) – professional basketball player with NBA's Chicago Bulls, Milwaukee Bucks, New Jersey Nets and Golden State Warriors.
- George Keenan – boxer, in 1931 won Golden Gloves welterweight championship.
- Ali LeRoi (1979) – actor, director, producer and Emmy Award-winning writer best known for his work with Chris Rock (The Chris Rock Show, Everybody Hates Chris).
- Shamier Little (2013) – 2014 NCAA 400m hurdles national champion; also on runner-up 4 × 400 m relay team while winning the team championship with Texas A&M University.
- Ethel L. Payne (1929) – award-winning journalist known as "First Lady of the Black Press"; first African–American woman to be issued White House press credentials and first to serve as commentator for national television newscast.
- George Ratkovicz (1940) – college and pro basketball player.
- Gene Rayburn (1936) – radio and television personality, best remembered as longtime host of game show Match Game (1962–84).
- John Walter Reagan – one of the Golden Thirteen, he was among first African-American commissioned officers in U.S. Navy
- Ken Rouse (1926) – college football player, center for Amos Alonzo Stagg's University of Chicago team from 1925 to 1927, captain of '27 team; won 1927 Chicago Tribune Silver Football as most valuable player in Big Ten Conference.
- Dale Samuels (1950) – college football player, quarterback for Purdue.
- Jerry Sanders (1955) – founder and CEO of Advanced Micro Devices.
- Eileen Jackson Southern (1938) – professor of Renaissance and African-American music; first African-American woman to become tenured full professor at Harvard University.
- Virginia Van Wie (1927) – golfer, 3-time U.S. Women's Amateur champion.
