= Down to Earth (2001 film) =

2001 American comedy film directed by Chris and Paul Weitz

- Theatrical release poster
- Directed by: Chris Weitz; Paul Weitz
- Screenplay by: Chris Rock; Lance Crouther; Ali LeRoi; Louis C.K.
- Based on: Heaven Can Wait 1978 film by; Elaine May; Warren Beatty; Heaven Can Wait 1938 play by Harry Segall
- Produced by: Sean Daniel; James Jacks; Michael Rotenberg
- Starring: Chris Rock; Regina King; Mark Addy; Eugene Levy; Frankie Faison; Greg Germann; Jennifer Coolidge; Chazz Palminteri
- Cinematography: Richard Crudo
- Edited by: Priscilla Nedd-Friendly
- Music by: Jamshied Sharifi
- Production companies: Village Roadshow Pictures; NPV Entertainment; 3 Arts Entertainment; Alphaville
- Distributed by: Paramount Pictures
- Release date: February 16, 2001
- Running time: 87 minutes
- Country: United States
- Language: English
- Budget: $30–49 million
- Box office: $71.2 million

Down to Earth is a 2001 American fantasy comedy film directed by Chris and Paul Weitz and written by Chris Rock, Lance Crouther, Ali LeRoi and Louis C.K. It is a remake of the 1978 film Heaven Can Wait, which is based on the 1938 stage play of the same name by Harry Segall. The film stars Chris Rock as Lance Barton, a comedian who is killed before his time on Earth is through. He is given another chance to continue his life, but in the body of a rich middle-aged white man.

The film was released on February 16, 2001 by Paramount Pictures. It received generally negative reviews from critics and grossed about $71 million worldwide.

== Plot ==
Lance Barton is a struggling comedian who is quite funny and confident in his personality, but is unable to bring his talent across in front of an audience. After being booed off stage one night, he hears about an opportunity from his manager, Whitney Daniels at the Apollo Theater, which is having a farewell show due to its imminent closing. He is hoping to get a chance to prove himself in front of a real audience, when on his way home riding a bike, Lance is distracted by Sontee Jenkins. He is hit by a truck and is instantly killed.

Lance is brought up to Heaven, where he meets the angels, King and Keyes, who reveal that Lance has been taken before his time, and though his body had been destroyed in the collision, they can help Lance return to Earth. After sorting through many bodies, they find Charles Wellington III, an extremely rich businessman freshly drowned in his tub by his wife and assistant, Winston Sklar. It is shown that Winston is having an affair with Charles's wife. Lance is horrified and is told he can help if he possesses Charles. Lance is reluctant until he discovers that Sontee, the woman he saw before his death, is protesting Charles by handcuffing herself to a coffee table in his penthouse, demanding Charles' presence. Seeing this as a chance to get to know her, Lance makes a deal with King to temporarily lend Charles' body until a more suitable body is found.

Soon after, Charles returns from death, but with the witty soul of Lance inside him. Everyone except for the angels and him sees him as the middle-aged, rich, white Charles. His return shocks Winston and his wife who had lethally poisoned Charles. After confronting them, Lance then helps Sontee who has lost the key to the handcuffs and has to ask him for help. He tries to bond with Sontee using his usual humour to make a joke about things but she sees him as cruelly mocking her and leaves.

Although Charles was unpopular in the past, the public and those closest to Charles start to notice a change in his personality. He transforms from a snobbish billionaire to a heartfelt philanthropist, giving the maid Wanda a raise and putting others before profit. He also enrages his board of directors by allowing the media into a board meeting at a hospital Charles owns and by promising free treatment for everyone who needs it.

Despite recent events, Lance continues to follow his comedy dreams through Charles, contacting his old manager Whitney and convincing him that he is Lance reincarnated. Through many humorous moments and issues, he gets Sontee to fall in love with him. Charles' wife briefly tries to seduce Lance, but he kindly rebuffs her as he knows she is not in love with her husband; he stuns her by telling her she can have what she wants in a divorce and it will not matter to him.

Lance, now happy with his new life, decides he wants to stay as Charles, despite the angels reminding him of their deal. Soon after, Charles is murdered by an assassin hired by the board of directors, fulfilling the deal Lance and King set up earlier. King and Keyes then send Lance to return yet again to Earth as Joe Guy, a great comedian and more acceptable candidate, who will die in a car accident. Joe returns from this accident unscathed, now with Lance's soul.

After pulling off a successful performance at the Apollo and reconnecting with Whitney, King and Keyes inform Lance that after their current conversation, he will not remember them or his past lives, but that his soul and personality will continue to exist in Joe Guy. After they leave, Joe has no memory of them or being Lance but still reconnects and instinctively bonds with Whitney again, and proceeds to meet Sontee again, after the show in the theater for the first time as Joe Guy, surprising her by unknowingly using the same words Lance said.

== Cast ==
- Chris Rock as Lance Barton
- Regina King as Sontee Jenkins
- Mark Addy as Cisco
- Eugene Levy as Keyes
- Frankie Faison as Whitney Daniels
- Greg Germann as Winston Sklar
- Jennifer Coolidge as Mrs. Wellington
- Chazz Palminteri as King
- Wanda Sykes as Wanda
- John Cho as Phil Quon
- Mario Joyner as Apollo M.C.
- Arnold Pinnock as Joe Guy
- Brian Rhodes as Charles Wellington III
- Telma Hopkins as Woman in Audience (uncredited)
- Mustafa Shakir as Doorman (uncredited)

== Reception ==
=== Critical response ===
On the review aggregator website Rotten Tomatoes, 19% of 95 critics' reviews are positive, with an average rating of 3.6/10. The website's consensus reads: "A toned down Chris Rock fails to bring a limp script to life as the movie moves from one gag to the next." Metacritic, which uses a weighted average, assigned the film a score of 32 out of 100, based on 28 critics, indicating "generally unfavorable" reviews. Audiences polled by CinemaScore gave the film an average grade of B on an A+ to F scale.

=== Box office ===
Down to Earth grossed $64.2 million in the United States and Canada, and $7 million in other territories, for a worldwide gross of $71.2 million.

The film made $17.3 million in its opening weekend, finishing second. It then made $11.2 million the following weekend, remaining in second place.

== Soundtrack ==
A soundtrack containing hip hop and R&B music was released on 20 February 2001 through Sony Music’s soundtrack imprint Sony Music Soundtrax. It peaked at number 71 on the Billboard 200 and number 34 on the Top R&B/Hip-Hop Albums chart.

== See also ==
- List of films about angels
