= List of U.S. national Golden Gloves welterweight champions =

This is a list of United States national Golden Gloves champions in the welterweight division, along with the state or region they represented. The weight limit for welterweights was first contested at 147 lb (67 kg), but was increased to 152 lb (69 kg) in 2003.

- 1928 – Nick Fosco – Chicago
- 1929 – Bud Hammer – Chicago
- 1930 – Karl Ogren – Chicago
- 1931 – George Keenan – Chicago
- 1932 – Johnny Phagan – Chicago
- 1933 – Henry Rothier – Davenport
- 1934 – Danny Farrar – Cleveland
- 1935 – King Wyatt – Fort Wayne
- 1936 – Chester Rutecki – Chicago
- 1937 – Verne Patterson – Chicago
- 1938 – James O'Malley – Chicago
- 1939 – Milton Jones – St. Louis
- 1940 – Savior Canadeo – Chicago
- 1941 – Geo. W. Horne, Jr. – Cleveland
- 1942 – Bob Burns – Fort Wayne
- 1943 – Ballessando Carubia – Chicago
- 1944 – Yevi Soluthali – Peoria
- 1945 – Gilbert Garcia – Fort Worth
- 1946 – Julius Menendez – Chicago
- 1947 – John Keough – Cleveland
- 1948 – Richard Guerrero – Chicago
- 1949 – Richard Guerrero – Chicago
- 1950 – Dick Anderson – Cleveland
- 1951 – Willard Henry – Kansas City
- 1952 – Herschel Acton – Los Angeles
- 1953 – Richard Wall – Oklahoma City
- 1954 – Rudy Sawyer – Great Lakes
- 1955 – Richard Wall – Tulsa
- 1956 – Leon Brooks – St. Louis
- 1957 – Joe Shaw – Kansas City
- 1958 – Dave Holman – Toledo
- 1959 – Don Sargeant – Minneapolis
- 1960 – Fred Hernandez – Omaha
- 1961 – Roy McMillian – Toledo
- 1962 – Rory O'Shea – Chicago
- 1963 – Wade Smith – Muncie
- 1964 – Don Cobbs – St. Louis
- 1965 – Don Cobbs – St. Louis
- 1966 – Hedgeman Lewis – Detroit
- 1967 – Pat O'Connor – Rochester, MN
- 1968 – Richard Royal – Charlotte
- 1969 – David Oropeza – Salt Lake City
- 1970 – Melvin Dennis – Fort Worth
- 1971 – Larry Carlisle – Charlotte
- 1972 – Jesse Valdez – Las Vegas
- 1973 – Harold Beal – Kansas City
- 1974 – Clinton Jackson – Las Vegas
- 1975 – Clinton Jackson – Knoxville
- 1976 – Clinton Jackson – Knoxville
- 1977 – Mike McCallum – Miami
- 1978 – Jeffrey Stoudemire – Cleveland
- 1979 – Mike McCallum – Knoxville
- 1980 – Donald Curry – Fort Worth
- 1981 – Manuel Vallejo – Los Angeles
- 1982 – Roman George – Lafayette
- 1983 – Louis Howard – St. Louis
- 1984 – Mylon Watkins – Las Vegas
- 1985 – Anthony Stephens – Louisiana
- 1986 – Frank Liles – Syracuse
- 1987 – Roger Turner – Grand Rapids
- 1988 – Ron Morgan, Jr. – Louisville
- 1989 -- James Myers -- Los Angeles, California
- 1990 – Nathan Fortier– Michigan
- 1991 – Ross Thompson—{Florida}
- 1992 – Stephen Golisano – East Boston MA
- 1993 – David Reid – Pennsylvania
- 1993 - Anthony W Melberg - Barstow, California
- 1994 – Orlando Hollis – Texas
- 1995 – David Palac – Detroit
- 1996 – Brandon Mitchell – Knoxville
- 1997 – Cory Spinks, St. Louis
- 1998 – Anthony Hanshaw – Cleveland
- 1999 – James Erminger - Louisiana
- 2000 – Anthony Thompson – Pennsylvania
- 2001 – James Parison – California
- 2002 – Durrell Richardson – Cleveland
- 2003 – Andre Berto – Florida
- 2004 – Daniel Jacobs – NY Metro
- 2005 – Brad Solomon – Mid-South
- 2006 – Demetrius Andrade – New England
- 2007 – Demetrius Andrade – New England
- 2008 – Carlo Pizarro- Springfield Ma
- 2009 – Errol Spence – Desoto, TX
- 2010 – David Grayton – DC
- 2011 – Arturo Trujillo - Pennsylvania
- 2012 - Alex Martin - Illinois
- 2013 - Erickson Lubin - Orlando, Florida
- 2014 - Sammy Valentin - Tampa, Florida
- 2015 - Rashid Stevens - Ohio
- 2016 - Brian Ceballo - New York City
- 2017 - Leon Lawson III - Flint, Michigan
- 2018 - Reshat Mati - New York City
- 2019 - Morris Young - Michigan
- 2020 - Canceled due to the COVID-19 pandemic
- 2021 - Giovanni Marquez - Texas
- 2022 - Atilano Escobar - Wisconsin
- 2023 - Adrian Salazar - Texas
- 2024 - Jasir Riley - Cleveland
