= Mario Joyner =

American comedian (born 1961)

- Born: October 3, 1961 (age 65); Pittsburgh, Pennsylvania, U.S.
- Occupations: Stand-up comedian; actor
- Notable work: The Chris Rock Show; Everybody Hates Chris; Where Did I Put Those Bits

Comedy career
- Years active: 1983–present
- Medium: Stand-up, television

Mario Joyner (born October 3, 1961) is an American stand-up comedian and actor best known as the host of MTV's Half Hour Comedy Hour from 1988 to 1992.

== Early life ==
He was born on October 3, 1961, in Pittsburgh, Pennsylvania. After some time at Vincennes University, he attended the University of Pittsburgh, participating as a track athlete at both schools.

== Career ==
He made his film debut in 1987 in Three Men and a Baby, and later starred in Hangin' with the Homeboys and Pootie Tang.

He is a longtime friend and collaborator of comedians Chris Rock and Jerry Seinfeld. He appeared regularly on The Chris Rock Show and Everybody Hates Chris. He also guest starred in the Seinfeld episodes "The Engagement" and "The Puerto Rican Day," playing two different characters, and voiced the character Jackson in the film Bee Movie. He has opened on national tours for Chris Rock (during his "No Apologies" tour) and for Jerry Seinfeld. He appeared in Comedians in Cars Getting Coffee with Jerry Seinfeld in July 2019.

During the October 12, 2010, episode of The Daily Show with Jon Stewart, in an interview with Congressman Eric Cantor, Stewart credited Joyner with the joke: "Sort of in the way that murderers get sometimes, like, 'I found Jesus and I'm OK now.' 'Well, when did you find Jesus?' 'Right after you found me.'"

== Filmography ==
=== Film ===
Year	Title	Role	Notes
1987	Three Men and a Baby	Cab Driver	
1990	Sgt. Kabukiman N.Y.P.D.	Hole in the Head Thug	
1991	Hangin' with the Homeboys	Tom McNeal	
2001	Down to Earth	Apollo M.C.	
2001	Pootie Tang	Lacey	
2002	Comedian	Self	Documentary
2003	Head of State	Lotto Man	
2003	Carolina	Stage Manager	
2007	Bee Movie	Jackson	Voice
2011	Just Go with It	Henderson	
2011	Bucky Larson: Born to Be a Star	Claudio	

=== Television ===
Year	Title	Role	Notes
1989	Camp MTV	Self	Television film
1995, 1998	Seinfeld	Lamar / Mario Joyner	2 episodes
1999	It's Like, You Know...	Jesse Jackson	Episode: "The Long Goodbye"
1997	The Chris Rock Show	Dr. Leonard Laxalt / Dr. Peter Johnson / Professor Thad Taylor	5 episodes
2000–2001	Clerks: The Animated Series	Lando	2 episodes
2003	Wanda at Large	Jonathan Lyles	Episode: "King Rat"
2005	Arrested Development	Mario	Episode: "Meat the Veals"
2006–2008	Everybody Hates Chris	Dr. Information	9 episodes
2010	Nick Swardson's Pretend Time	Doctor	Episode: "Mudslide Junction"
2012	Big Time Rush	Security Guard	Episode: "Bel Air Rush"
2012, 2014, 2019	Comedians in Cars Getting Coffee	Self	3 episodes
