= Pootie Tang =

2001 American comedy film by Louis C.K.

- Theatrical release poster
- Directed by: Louis C.K.
- Written by: Louis C.K.
- Produced by: Caldecot Chubb; David Gale; Ali LeRoi; Chris Rock
- Starring: Lance Crouther; Jennifer Coolidge; Wanda Sykes; Robert Vaughn; Chris Rock
- Cinematography: Willy Kurant
- Edited by: Doug Abel; David Lewis Smith
- Music by: QD3; Prince Paul
- Production companies: Alphaville Films; 3 Arts; HBO Downtown Productions
- Distributed by: Paramount Pictures; MTV Films; Chris Rock Productions
- Release date: June 29, 2001
- Running time: 81 minutes
- Country: United States
- Language: English
- Budget: $7 million
- Box office: $3.3 million

Pootie Tang is a 2001 American comedy film written and directed by Louis C.K. and adapted from a comedy sketch that first appeared on The Chris Rock Show. The character Pootie Tang is a satire of the stereotyped action heroes who appeared in old blaxploitation films. The title character's speech, which vaguely resembles pidgin, is mostly unintelligible to the audience, but the other characters in the film have no problem understanding him.

The film was a box office bomb, grossing just $3.3 million, and received negative reviews for its humor and depiction of women. The film has since become a cult classic.

== Plot ==
Pootie Tang sits down for a TV interview, at which the interviewer (Bob Costas) asks about Pootie's upcoming movie. At this point, a movie clip is played. Although initially unclear, the events described below all appear to be part of the movie clip played during the interview as revealed at the end of the movie.

Pootie Tang, born in "a small town outside Gary, Indiana", is portrayed as a ladies' man who is "too cool for words", even as a young child. His life is marked by the deaths of his mother "Momma Dee", and shortly thereafter his father "Daddy Tang", who dies after being mauled by a gorilla during his shift at the steel mill (the third time that year someone had suffered that particular fate). Just before Daddy Tang's death, Pootie inherits his father's belt and is told that (as long as he has right on his side) he can "whoop anyone's ass with just that belt." He uses his dying breath to warn his son to not let the ladies get between him and the belt.

As a young adult, Pootie Tang rises to fame and becomes well known for a variety of reasons. He sings in nightclubs, stars in public service announcements for children, produces top-of-the-charts music hits, and generally defeats wrongdoers with the power of his belt. Dick Lecter, the chief operating officer of multi-industrial conglomerate LecterCorp, learns of Pootie Tang's positive influence on society — and his negative influence on LecterCorp's bottom line. After his henchmen and a villain named Dirty Dee are sent away by Pootie's friends, Lecter encourages his right-hand lady, Ireenie, to seduce Pootie Tang into signing an agreement with LecterCorp that would stop Pootie Tang's influence on America's children.

Pootie Tang falls for Ireenie's tricks and subsequently falls apart. His pop cultural status is destroyed, and he engages on a quest to "find [him]self". This journey is encouraged by his friend Biggie Shorty, who promises to wait for Pootie to return to her and to the rest of society. Pootie moves to a farm where the local sheriff decides Pootie should start dating his daughter. After his single corn stalk dies, he has a vision of Daddy Tang and Momma Dee. Daddy Tang reveals that there is nothing special about Pootie's belt; instead, Pootie must fight evil with the goodness that is inside him. After dealing with Dirty Dee and his henchman Froggy (as well as getting his belt back), Pootie realizes he must move back to the city and fight crime once again.

Pootie Tang returns to the city just as Dick Lecter is unveiling the first of his new restaurant chain, Pootie's Bad Time Burgers. At a small news conference, Pootie confronts Lecter only to discover that Lecter has amassed dozens of "Pootie-alikes" who will spread the message of LecterCorp around the nation. Pootie Tang, with the help of Biggie Shorty, defeats all of these henchmen and Lecter himself. Good triumphs over evil once again, and Biggie Shorty finally gets her man: she and Pootie Tang plan to get married now that Pootie is back. Elsewhere, Dick Lecter leaves corporate life and becomes an actor, Ireenie leaves him and becomes a counselor helping at-risk teenage prostitutes, and Dirty Dee is still dirty.

== Cast ==
- Lance Crouther as Pootie Tang
  - Cole Hawkins as “Little Pootie”
- Jennifer Coolidge as Ireenie
- Wanda Sykes as Biggie Shorty
- Robert Vaughn as Dick Lecter
- Chris Rock as J.B. / Radio DJ / Daddy Tang
- Dave Attell as Frank
- Reg E. Cathey as Dirty Dee
- J. B. Smoove as Trucky
  - Bryan Hearne as “Little Trucky”
- Mario Joyner as Lacey
- J. D. Williams as Froggy
- Cathy Trien as Stacy
- Christopher Wynkoop as the Sheriff, Stacy's father
- Laura Kightlinger as Laura Knight, a TV news anchorwoman
- Rick Shapiro as Shakey
- Missy Elliott as Diva
- David Cross as Dennis, a “Pootie-Alike” employed by Lecter
- Andy Richter as Record Executive
- Kristen Bell as Record executive's Daughter
- Jon Glaser as Recording Engineer
- Keesha Sharp as Party Girl
- Todd Barry as Greasy
- Bob Costas as Himself
- Conan O'Brien as Himself (uncredited)
- Gwyneth Paltrow as Herself (archived footage)

== Production ==
Originally a Paramount Classics film titled Pootie Tang in Sine Your Pitty on the Runny Kine, the budget was increased and transferred to the main Paramount Pictures division. After watching Louis C.K. talk to Caldecot Chubb, one of the movie's producers, Rock predicted that Chubb would eventually betray an unsuspecting C.K. and take the movie away from him. C.K. has said that he was all but fired from the film during the editing phase. According to him, Ali LeRoi was hired to extensively re-edit the film. Openly agreeing with Roger Ebert's dismissive criticism that the movie should not have even been released, C.K. has said that the finished product, though containing parts he enjoyed, was far from his own vision.

== Reception ==
Critical reception was generally negative. On Rotten Tomatoes, the film has an approval rating of 27% based on 45 reviews, with an average score of 3.7/10. The site's critical consensus states: "Based as it is on a short skit, Pootie Tang overstays its welcome." On Metacritic, the film received a score of 31 based on 19 reviews, indicating "generally unfavorable reviews".

Roger Ebert gave the film a half-star rating, criticizing it for its excessive use of vulgar language and demeaning portrayal of women, describing it as a "train wreck" and finishing his review by bluntly stating "This film is not in a releasable condition." Nathan Rabin at The A.V. Club said Pootie Tang "borders on audience abuse" and "confuse[s] idiocy for absurdity and randomness for wit." In 2009, fellow A.V. Club writer Scott Tobias revisited the film and included it in his New Cult Canon series, noting that "Pootie Tang repelled mainstream critics and audiences, but it holds an exalted status among alt-comedians and fans of subversive anti-comedy in general."

Kevin Murphy also praised the film in his book A Year at the Movies:

Pootie Tang crosses all cultural barriers to become the dumbest movie I've seen in an entire generation. But it is also funny as hell ... Pootie Tang strives for the dumbness it achieves, a feat few films can do ... this is a good kind of dumb. Like mooning. Like a cat falling off a table.

== Soundtrack ==
A soundtrack containing mainstream hip hop, dance, and R&B music was released on June 16, 2001, by Hollywood Records. It peaked at #51 on the Top R&B/Hip-Hop Albums and #22 on the Top Soundtracks.

== In popular culture ==
- In Snoop Dogg's song "Bo$$ Playa" from his 2002 album Paid tha Cost to Be da Boss, the chorus includes the line "Okay, 'Sa Da Tay' like my nigga Pootie Tang".
- In Season 2, Episode 3 of the television series The Bernie Mac Show ("Pink Gold"), Chris Rock (who appears in Pootie Tang) attends a poker game at Bernie Mac's house. A player remarks that he loves Pootie Tang, to which Rock replies, "My mother didn't see that one."
- In the 2003 horror film spoof Scary Movie 3, George Carlin's character, The Architect, says he accidentally returned a cursed video tape to Blockbuster, thinking it was Pootie Tang. Subsequently, aliens arrive on Earth and claim they watched the video tape that spurred their visits to Earth because they thought it was Pootie Tang.
- In Kanye West's song "School Spirit" from his 2004 album The College Dropout, West references the movie when he raps, "See, that's how dude became the young Pootie Tang—tippy tow".
- In Big Sean's song "Dance (Ass)" from his 2011 album Finally Famous, he references the movie when he raps "Take my belt off, bitch I'm Pootie Tang / Tippy tow, tippy tay, you gon' get a tip today."
- In Megan Thee Stallion's song "Freak Nasty" from her 2018 EP Tina Snow, she references the movie when she raps, "call that pussy Pootie Tang, 'cus I got the runny kine". "Runny Kine" are the last two words in the title of Pootie's upcoming (fictional) movie, for which he is being interviewed during the first scene of the film.
- In Veeze's song "GOMD" from his 2023 album Ganger, he references the movie when he raps, "he done dropped a hundred tapes, made no noise like Pootie Tang".
