= George Keenan =

American boxer

George Keenan was an American boxer from Chicago. In 1931 he won the National Golden Gloves Welterweight Champions.
