= Lance Crouther =

American actor

- Occupations: Actor, television producer, television writer
- Known for: Real Time with Bill Maher, Pootie Tang

Lance Crouther is an American television producer, television writer and actor. He was the head writer of the TBS late night show Lopez Tonight until 2010, and was a writer for Down to Earth, Wanda at Large, and Good Hair, among others. As an actor, he was the star of the feature film Pootie Tang.

Crouther, along with Chris Rock, Jeff Stilson, and Chuck Sklar, received a nomination for the Writers Guild of America Award for Best Documentary Screenplay for Good Hair.

== Filmography ==
=== As writer ===
- Lights Out with David Spade (2019-2020)
- Historical Roasts (2019)
- 2018 MTV Movie & TV Awards (2018)
- Def Comedy Jam 25 (2017)
- The Oscars (2016)
- Saturday Night Live (2014)
- Last Comic Standing (2014)
- BET Awards 2014 (2014)
- Wanda Sykes Presents Herlarious (2013)
- 2013 Billboard Music Awards (2013)
- Pauly Shore's Pauly~tics (2012)
- Lopez Tonight (2009–2010)
- Good Hair (2009)
- Frank TV (2008)
- Real Time with Bill Maher (2006–2007)
- Everybody Hates Chris (2006)
- Taurus World Stunt Awards (2005)
- Barbershop (2005)
- 2005 BET Comedy Awards (2005)
- 77th Academy Awards (2005)
- Wanda Does It (2004)
- On the Record with Bob Costas (2002–2004)
- Wanda at Large (2003)
- 55th Primetime Emmy Awards (2003)
- The Wayne Brady Show (2001–2003)
- Down to Earth (2001)
- Happily Ever After: Fairy Tales for Every Child (2000)
- The Chris Rock Show (1997-1998)
- The Gregory Hines Show (1999)
- Comic Justice (1993)

=== As actor ===
- Lights Out with David Spade (2019-2020)
- Frank TV (2007)
- Pootie Tang (2001)
- The Chris Rock Show (1997)
- CB4 (1993)
- Fear of a Black Hat (1993)
- Class Act (1992)
- Talkin' Dirty After Dark (1991)
- Lifestories (1990)
