= Tom Agna =

American comedian and comic writer

Tom Agna is an American comedian, actor, producer, and comic writer.

== Career ==
As an actor, Agna appeared in episodes of Seinfeld, one of Dr. Katz, Professional Therapist, Conan O'Brien, Jay Leno, and David Letterman multiple times. His success in the comedy industry began in the mid 1990s. He has also written for a number of comedies which include The Chris Rock Show, Late Night with Conan O'Brien, Mad TV, George Lopez, Weekends at the D.L., and the documentary P. Diddy Presents the Bad Boys of Comedy.

Agna shared an Emmy for his work on The Chris Rock Show and a Writers Guild of America Award for writing on Late Night with Conan O'Brien.

== Filmography ==
=== Television ===
Year	Title	Role	Notes
1996	Dr. Katz, Professional Therapist	Tom	Episode: "ESP"
1997	Late Night with Conan O'Brien	Lips of Jimmy Carter	Episode: "Tom Brokaw/Jerry O'Connell/Los Straitjackets"; also writer
1998	Seinfeld	Gary	Episode: "The Puerto Rican Day"
1998	The Chris Rock Show	Various	3 episodes; also writer and co-producer
