= The Chris Rock Show =

Late-night talk show

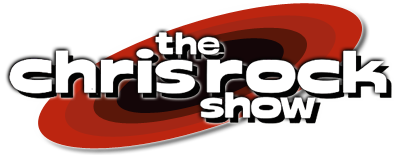
- Genre: Talk show Sketch comedy
- Created by: Chris Rock
- Written by: Louis C.K. Vernon Chatman; Daniel Dratch
- Presented by: Chris Rock
- Starring: Chris Rock
- Theme music composer: Grandmaster Flash
- Country of origin: United States
- Original language: English
- No. of seasons: 5
- No. of episodes: 55

Production
- Executive producers: Chris Rock; Michael Rotenberg; Nancy Geller
- Producers: Louis C.K. Wanda Sykes
- Production location: New York City
- Production companies: CR Enterprises, Inc. 3 Arts Entertainment; HBO Downtown Productions

Original release
- Network: HBO
- Release: February 7, 1997 – November 25, 2000

The Chris Rock Show was a weekly, Friday night, late-night talk show and variety show featured on HBO. It was created by comedian and namesake Chris Rock and featured various guests. The show won an Emmy for Outstanding Writing for a Variety or Music Program in 1999. It ran for five seasons from February 7, 1997, to November 25, 2000.

== Series overview ==
Season	Episodes	Originally released	
Season	Episodes	First released	Last released
1	5	February 7, 1997	March 7, 1997
2	12	September 12, 1997	December 12, 1997
3	13	August 21, 1998	November 6, 1998
4	12	September 17, 1999	December 17, 1999
5	13	August 19, 2000	November 25, 2000

== Episodes ==
=== Season 1 (1997) ===
No. overall	No. in season	Interview Guest	Musical (or other) Guest	Original release date
1	1	Johnnie Cochran	The Artist Formerly Known as Prince	February 7, 1997
In the cold opening, Chris Rock goes backstage, reminisces about the time he had his own show, and starts to play a VHS tape of the first episode.; In a pre-taped segment, Chris petitions people in Howard Beach about renaming a street "Tupac Shakur Boulevard".; Chris and Johnnie talk about the aftermath of the O. J. Simpson trial.; An ad is shown for "Million Man Action Figures".; Chris talks to legal correspondent Coleman Brooks (Mario Joyner) about the possible ramifications of a case he's currently working on.; The Artist Formerly Known as Prince performs "Face Down". (cut from the DVD release); At the end of the show, Chris encounters Conan O'Brien in his dressing room, and Conan forcibly gives Chris "his wings".
2	2	Jenifer Lewis	D'Angelo	February 14, 1997
For the special Valentine's Day show, Chris reads an excerpt from the fictional book: Ike Turner's "The Rules", then shows an educational filmstrip, "Dating & Romance in the Modern World".; Jenifer and Chris have a flirty discussion about what women want.; An ad is shown for the law firm of Pervis, Pervis & Platt, who also specialize in nail and hair work.; In a pre-taped segment, Chris reunites with three of his ex-girlfriends and presents them with flowers, candy, and pigs' feet ... then reveals them in the audience.; D'Angelo performs "Lady" with Raphael Saadiq, Ali Shaheed Muhammad and ?uestlove.
3	3	John Amos	Cake	February 21, 1997
Black History Month Minute: special guest Greg Gumbel presents an anecdote about George Washington.; A clip is shown of Louis Farrakhan (re-dubbed voice of Ali LeRoi) reaching out to the Jewish community.; In a pre-taped segment, Chris tracks a $5 bill through Harlem.; John Amos is greeted with a standing ovation (and a crying Wanda Sykes), and he and Chris talk about John's work on Good Times and the rest of his oeuvre to date.; Black History Month Minute: special guest Eartha Kitt presents an anecdote about Karen Black.; Chris talks via satellite to Donny Savoy (Ali LeRoi) and Richie Banks (Lance Crouther) about this year's Oscar-nominated black actors.; Black History Month Minute: special guest Stanley Crouch presents an anecdote about Ford cars being painted black.; Cake performs "The Distance" and "I Will Survive", while John Amos runs away from four hungry women.
4	4	Tyson Beckford	Maxwell	February 28, 1997
In a PSA, Chris introduces the "Knives for Guns" exchange program.; Chris speaks via satellite to CRTV correspondents Marvin Blazer and Ali LeRoi about Chris's earlier decision to eat a cheeseburger in Times Square.; Chris presents a clip from his favorite new HBO reality show, True Stories of the Justice Squad.; Chris and Tyson talk about the reactions that Tyson gets on the street, then Chris announces the winner of the lottery for a date with Tyson.; A commercial is shown for "Video Mama", a babysitter substitute video series.; Chris has a confusing interview with Rev. Benjamin Thomas (Mario Joyner).; Maxwell performs "Somethin' Somethin'".
5	5	Tracy Morgan	Erykah Badu	March 7, 1997
Cold open: Chris and Stuart Scott give a sports-style recap of the most recent Def Comedy Jam.; An ad is shown for "Maximum Strength Siggorette", which supposedly helps one quit smoking (though not really).; Chris and Tracy talk about their roles on Saturday Night Live, then Chris gives Tracy his own SNL character: "The Loud But Wrong Guy".; In a pre-taped segment, Chris goes on a spiritual journey.; Erykah Badu performs "On and On".; At the end of the show, Chris shows a "pre-enactment" clip from next week's episode with guest Oprah Winfrey – with one of the writers as a stand-in for Oprah.

=== Season 2 (1997) ===
No. overall	No. in season	Interview Guest	Musical (or other) Guest	Original release date
1	6	Arsenio Hall	Puff Daddy	September 12, 1997
Cold open: Greg Gumbel reports that Chris Rock is the latest casualty in the East Coast/West Coast comedy war, with soundbites from Robert Townsend, Jimmy Walker, Nipsey Russell, Keenen Ivory Wayans, Janeane Garofalo, Andrew "Dice" Clay, and suspect Carrot Top. Chris performs a musical tribute to recently-deceased Mobutu Sese Seko. Chris and Arsenio talk about talk shows, then watch the "Puff Daddy Remix" of their interview. Chris interviews professor Thad Taylor (Mario Joyner), who shows hidden camera footage of himself getting thrown out of a restaurant and a cab because he's black (actually, because he's naked). Puff Daddy and Ma$e perform "Been Around the World".
2	7	Conan O'Brien	Wyclef Jean	September 19, 1997
Cold open: Chris talks about auditioning for The Chris Rock Show (with a soundbite from David Alan Grier). In a documentary segment, Chris receives his G.E.D. Conan talks about his show, basketball, and his life in high school, and does some ebonic stand-up comedy. In an infomercial, self-made millionaire Malcolm Monroe (Chris) hawks his money-making system: lottery tickets. Wyclef Jean performs "Gone Till November" with the Urban Youth Symphony.
3	8	Whoopi Goldberg	K-Ci & JoJo	September 26, 1997
In a pre-taped segment, Chris interviews people in Harlem about whether they like golf, and plays a game himself. Chris and Whoopi plug each other's books and make small talk. Chris interviews his special guest, Pootie Tang (Lance Crouther), who brings a clip from his new movie, Sine Your Pity on the Runny Kine. K-Ci & JoJo perform "Last Night's Letter".
4	9	Vivica A. Fox	Missy "Misdemeanor" Elliott	October 3, 1997
Jon Hayman gives a live report from Times Square for the Rosh Hashannah ball dropping. Chris uses a photo montage to honor those noble Americans who perform oral sex, then shows a preview of an upcoming HBO documentary, The Darkness Chasers. Chris makes Vivica laugh as they talk about her film roles in Independence Day and Booty Call. Chris talks via satellite to Sophia James (Wanda Sykes), a stripper who is suing her customers for sexual harassment. Missy Elliott performs "Sock It 2 Me", after which the Rosh Hashannah ball drops.
5	10	Bryant Gumbel	LL Cool J	October 10, 1997
Chris Rock's monologue has its own sponsor: God. In a pre-taped segment, Chris interviews people about jobs for school dropouts (with a cameo by Nipsey Russell). Chris and Bryant discuss race, controversy in journalism, sleep, and Bryant's charity work. An ad is shown for a new video: Dorf on Crack. Chris interviews Dr. Peter Johnson (Mario Joyner), who shows videos of his assisted suicide cases, then chases a sneezing man with a chainsaw. LL Cool J performs "Phenomenon", and the chase continues during the credits.
6	11	J.C. Watts	Busta Rhymes	October 17, 1997
Cold open: A trailer is shown for the latest film from Ignent Pictures, "Soundtrack: The Movie", and its soundtrack. Chris plays a preview of a new HBO reality show, No One Called 911. Chris and J.C. Watts discuss race in politics. Busta Rhymes performs "Dangerous". The public's reactions to "Soundtrack: The Movie" are shown during the credits.
7	12	Chris Spencer	Bobby Brown	October 24, 1997
Chris plays a re-edited clip from the Million Woman March in which Jada Pinkett Smith leads the crowd in a chant of "The Roof is On Fire". A political ad is shown advising to vote no on Proposition 238 and read its fine print, with endorsement from Al Sharpton. Rock and Spencer talk about Spencer's former job on Vibe. In a pre-taped segment, Chris visits funeral homes and interviews people about death. For Halloween, Kiddie Kable News anchors Wanda Witch (Wanda Sykes) and Scoopo the Clown (Ali LeRoi) grin as they report gruesome news items. Bobby Brown performs "Feeling Inside".
8	13	Jesse Jackson	Rakim	November 7, 1997
Cold open: an ad is shown for The Church of Latter Day Gay Sex. Chris points out that the winner of the New York City Marathon (Chris) is in the audience. In a pre-taped segment, Chris interviews representatives of different political parties (with a few soundbites from Michael J. Fox). Chris and Jesse talk about the lack of motivation to keep the American dream alive. Rakim performs a medley including "Paid in Full", "I Ain't No Joke" and "Microphone Fiend". A voiceover gives instructions for obtaining a VHS copy of tonight's show: tape the rerun.
9	14	Al Sharpton	Mary J. Blige	November 21, 1997
Chris presents a new segment, "Shame On You", where crimes against consumers are investigated. Chris and Al talk about what Al needs to do to become elected (mainly, change his hairdo). An ad is shown for LP Bob's Really Rare Records, where LP Bob (Lance Crouther) promotes controversial records that you can't have. Mary J. Blige performs "Seven Days".
10	15	George Carlin	Usher	November 28, 1997
Cold open: Footage of the Rodney King incident is shown in an edition of "Pop Pop Video". Chris shows some pictures of balloons in the Macy's Thanksgiving Day Parade. In a pre-taped segment, Chris interviews people about Thanksgiving, then invites them to a Thanksgiving dinner with a live turkey. Chris and George discuss TV censorship and George's past and present career. Chris talks via satellite to Dr. Leonard Laxalt (Mario Joyner) about his new treatment for depression: hard liquor. Usher performs "You Make Me Wanna". Note: The DVD release is edited to remove Maestro's "Table Dance" from the "hard liquor" segment.
11	16	Roy Jones Jr.	Salt-n-Pepa	December 5, 1997
Cold open: an ad is shown for the "Dataport 2000T," a non-electric data device. In a pre-taped segment, we see what people on the street are listening to on their headphones. In another pre-taped segment, Chris asks people about how they are preparing for Y2K. Chris asks Roy about what it's like boxing. An ad is shown for the "Wavelink 2000". Chris talks via satellite to Dawn Wise (Wanda Sykes), who just gave birth to dec-octuplets (18 babies). Salt-n-Pepa perform "Gitty Up".
12	17	Jada Pinkett	LSG	December 12, 1997
Cold open: Chris stars in a PSA about rickets. Chris shows some (fictitious) clips from previous episodes featuring different video backdrops. A trailer is shown for a new HBO special: When Animals Attack in High Speed Chases II. Chris and Jada talk about movie roles, the Million Woman March, and getting politically involved. Jada wins a bottle of wine for doing an interview without mentioning her husband's name. An animated short is shown: "Bad Phone Sex" (with audio from Chris's album Roll with the New). Chris's special guest, Pootie Tang, stops by to talk about his latest activity, and play an excerpt from his latest music video, Tippy Tye on my Cappatown. LSG performs "My Body".

=== Season 3 (1998) ===
No. overall	No. in season	Interview Guest	Musical (or other) Guest	Original release date
1	18	Johnnie Cochran	Tricky	August 21, 1998
Cold open: A trailer is shown for "The Chris Mullin Show", airing after The Chris Rock Show – "ain't nothin' but net!". An ad is shown for attorney Kurtis Kopeland (Chris), who can prove that your baby was fathered by an NBA all-star athlete. Chris talks to Johnnie about the Monica Lewinsky scandal, then talks via satellite to White House mail room supervisor Sonia Brinson (Wanda Sykes) about the role that race plays in the scandal. Another trailer for The Chris Mullin Show is shown. Tricky performs "Carriage for Two".
2	19	Kweisi Mfume	Lenny Kravitz	August 28, 1998
Cold open: A PSA promotes apologizing after you've committed a crime. In a pre-taped segment, Chris goes door-to-door in Bensonhurst to raise money for "The Al Sharpton Slander Defense Fund". Chris and Kweisi talk about the NAACP. Chris talks via satellite to Ruth Uzzelle (Wanda Sykes), who's suing Pfizer because of the effect Viagara has had on her horndog husband. Lenny Kravitz performs "Fly Away".
3	20	Jayson Williams	Melanie Comarcho	September 4, 1998
Chris presents a clip from a press conference with Bill Clinton's new secretary, Mike Tyson. In a pre-taped segment, Chris interviews the people of Harlem about their reactions to the death of Princess Diana. Chris and Jayson talk about a basketball player's salary. Chris's special guest, Pootie Tang, stops by to talk about his recent press conference. A trailer is shown for a new summer blockbuster, Explosions! Melanie Comarcho performs stand-up comedy.
4	21	Jerry Springer	DMX	September 11, 1998
Chris shows a controversial clip from the Million Youth March, with Khalid Muhammad glorifying his bald head. Chris introduces Jerry Springer, who rushes out and starts brawling with Chris, until bodyguards separate them. An ad is shown for "The Gum", which cures cravings for masturbation. Chris re-introduces Jerry Springer, who sits down for a chat about his show and his former position as Mayor of Cincinnati. Chris interviews marriage counselor Dr. Marlon Lucius King Jr. (Mario Joyner), who talks about marriage issues. DMX performs "Fuckin' wit D" and "Ruff Ryders Anthem".
5	22	Rosie Perez	Esthero	September 18, 1998
Cold open: An ad is shown for "Thousand Dollar Beer", the official beer of Master P. Chris points out that Neptuna Williams (Chris), Venus and Serena's sister, is in the audience tonight, then plays an audio excerpt from a Monica Lewinsky phone interview. Chris and Rosie talk about the current Latin craze. Chris interviews NYPD officer Nick Bratini (Nick DiPaolo) about the NYPD's new programs to minimize police brutality against African-Americans. Esthero performs "Heaven Sent".
6	23	Wynton Marsalis	Biz Markie	October 2, 1998
Chris shows some title cards from recently-halted UPN sitcoms, then an infomercial for "The New You System", which will replace you with your thinner doppelganger. Chris and Wynton talk about his (Wynton's) recent gig at the White House, jazz musicians, and maturity. Chris moderates a discussion between A Black Guy (Ali LeRoi), a Sista (Wanda Sykes) and a White Dude (Tom Agna) about The Starr Report. Biz Markie performs "Bennie and the Jets".
7	24	D.L. Hughley	Outkast	October 9, 1998
Cold open: Attorney Kurtis Kopeland (Chris) will help you win in a wet paint lawsuit. Chris reads an article about The Secret Diary of Desmond Pfeiffer from an issue of Jet Magazine, displays some Crayola crayons with offensive names (including "Chris Rock's ass"), then shows footage of Darryl Strawberry's recent surgery. A video aimed at kids is shown: two clowns explain grown-up words. Chris and D.L. Hughley cover such topics as the difference between BET and ABC, and the Monica Lewinsky scandal. Outkast perform "Rosa Parks".
8	25	Larry Elder	Jay-Z	October 16, 1998
Chris engages in a debate with Larry about the Monica Lewinsky scandal. Jay-Z performs "Hard Knock Life (Ghetto Anthem)".
9	26	Adam Sandler	Faith Evans	October 27, 1998
Cold open: A political ad is shown for congressional candidate Roger Sykes (Chris), who will get you all the pornography you need. Chris presents poems by Maya Angelou (voice of Ali LeRoi) about Marion Barry and the ODB. A political ad is shown for congressional candidate Pootie Tang, who will "work hard to wapatau to the bammies". A reality show, "Damn Fool", is hosted by Dex Connell (Ali LeRoi), who belittles acts of stupidity in the face of danger. Adam and Chris talk about racism, condoms and oral sex. A political ad for congressional candidate Changa Tamp slanders Pootie Tang. Faith Evans performs "Love Like This".
10	27	Ward Connerly	Don "D.C." Curry	November 6, 1998
Chris reads from the first draft of the Declaration of Independence, and presents Jesse Ventura's opinion on abortion. In a pre-taped segment, Chris interviews people on Fifth Avenue to see who's "buying black". Chris and Ward discuss affirmative action and racial equality. Don "D.C." Curry performs stand-up comedy.
11	28	Magic Johnson	Method Man	November 13, 1998
Cold open: A PSA is shown which begs for the basketball season to start, otherwise we'll have crackheads playing with balls of garbage. In a pre-taped segment, Chris raises money for the basketball players affected by the NBA strike. Magic Johnson talks to Chris about his involvement with things other than HIV. Chris interviews Mannie Trumble (Mario Joyner), president of Proud Black Man Industries, makers of malt liquor. Method Man performs "Tical 2000: Judgment Day".
12	29	Ed Bradley	Chaka Khan	November 20, 1998
Cold open: A commercial is shown for the "Watermelon Disguiser", which helps dignified African Americans enjoy watermelon in public. Chris displays some drawings by children with ideas for how to execute prisoners. Chris goes undercover with a spoof of "Taxicab Confessions". Chris and Ed talk about journalism, and Ed's experiences in the Vietnam War. More "Taxi Driver Confessions" are shown. Chaka Khan performs "Spoon".
13	30	Lisa Nicole Carson	Beastie Boys	November 27, 1998
Cold open: HBO Sports presents Extreme Musical Chairs. Staff writer Chuck Sklar recalls an hilarious (to him) anecdote about a joke he made at a restaurant, and Chris challenges his sense of humor by going live via satellite to "there", where Ali LeRoi interviews people about whether Chuck's joke was funny. A pre-taped segment follows a day in the life of Chris Rock. Chris plays a clip from VH1's Behind the Music, profiling racist country singer Lionel X (Chris). Lisa shows the audience that her hair is not fake, then she and Chris cover such topics as dating, sex, and what women want. Chris plays a clip of his favorite comedian, Controversy LaRue (Chris), then introduces a new sponsor, Fly Sperling Hair Restoration Center. Beastie Boys perform "Body Movin'".

=== Season 4 (1999) ===
No. overall	No. in season	Interview Guest	Musical (or other) Guest	Original release date
1	31	Spike Lee	D'Angelo	September 17, 1999
Cold open: CRTV news anchors Farai Chideya and Ali LeRoi give a report on a recent smacking-upside-the-head rampage. Chris shows some footage of people in New York City getting sprayed with mosquito repellent. In a pre-taped segment, Chris interviews people in South Carolina about whether the Confederate flag should stay up. Chris and Spike Lee talk about African-American films. Chris talks via satellite to Sonia Brinson (Wanda Sykes) about Hillary Clinton's candidacy. D'Angelo performs "Chicken Grease". After the credits, Farai Chideya reports that the smacking-upside-the-head rampage has ended.
2	32	Allen Iverson	Red Hot Chili Peppers	September 24, 1999
Cold open: An ad for "Nigga Please" cereal is shown. Chris shows a clip from a UPN newscast, in which the anchors move like they're in an R&B video as they talk. Chris and Allen talk about his (Allen's) career. Chris converses via satellite with Puerto Rican Day Parade queen Maria Sanchez (Marilyn Torres), former NYPD officer Nick Nardizi (Nick DiPaolo), and Esther Jones (Wanda Sykes) about the recent pardons of the FALN. The Red Hot Chili Peppers perform "Around the World".
3	33	Al Sharpton	Les Nubians	October 1, 1999
Cold open: An ad for the "Malcolm X Games" is shown. Chris displays some offensive art pieces in the Brooklyn Museum. Chris and Al Sharpton talk about Al's involvement with the National Action Network. Chris interviews Terrell Sparks (Mario Joyner), the founder of search engine whazzup.com. Les Nubians perform "Demain".
4	34	Iyanla Vanzant	Mobb Deep	October 8, 1999
Cold open: An ad is shown containing prisoners singing "Fuck tha Police", spoofing the ads for The Gap. A documentary segment features Chris looking for the next "Great White Hope". Chris and Iyanla talk about what women want. Mobb Deep perform "The Quiet Storm".
5	35	Ken Hamblin	Me'shell Ndegeocello	October 22, 1999
Cold open: An ad is shown for Niggatrol, which helps African-Americans relieve themselves from headaches caused by racism. Chris displays some lesser known magazines geared towards African-Americans. In a pre-taped segment, Chris asks the people of Harlem what they want to see on TV. Chris and Ken cover such topics as manners, Brooklyn vs. the militia, and the mass media. Chris moderates a discussion between authors Juanita Briggs (Wanda Sykes) and Morrison McMillan (Ali LeRoi) about romance novels. Me'shell Ndegeocello performs "Loyalty".
6	36	Colin Quinn	JB Smoove	October 29, 1999
7	37	Don King	Dr. Dre, Snoop Dogg	November 5, 1999
Chris plays a taxi cab audio recording of Danny Glover (voice of Ali LeRoi), lists unsuccessful defenses used in court, then shows some footage of unsuccessful gunmen on a rampage. Don King and Chris talk about boxing. An ad is shown for a sports drink, PowerPizz. Chris interviews activist Kevin Turretts (Mario Joyner) about racism, and Kevin displays a new invention of his, the "SteadiCup". Dr. Dre and Snoop Dogg perform "Still D.R.E.", then perform "Bitch Please" with Xzibit during the credits.
8	38	Taye Diggs	The Roots	November 12, 1999
Chris proposes some ad ideas for Advil, Tic Tac, A-1, S-Curl and Nike, containing talking animals (in the vein of the taco bell chihuahua). Chris goes undercover again with more "Taxi Driver Confessions". Chris and Taye talk about nudity in movies. Even more "Taxi Driver Confessions" are shown. The Roots perform "What You Want".
9	39	MC Hammer	Q-Tip	November 26, 1999
Cold open: A trailer is shown for a new disaster movie, "Shitstorm!" Chris presents a look at some new (fake) game shows. Chris and MC Hammer talk about who the MC Hammer of today could be. An ad is shown for "Happy Together", a series of sexual instructional videos to masturbate to. Chris moderates a debate between a black guy (Ali LeRoi), a sista (Wanda Sykes) and a white dude (Tom Agna) about whether 13-year-old Nathaniel Abraham should be convicted. Q-Tip performs "Breathe and Stop" and "Vivrant Thing".
10	40	Cedric the Entertainer	Nas	December 3, 1999
Cold open: An ad is shown for ketchup, the all-purpose condiment. Chris displays some counterfeit Pokémon trading cards, then stars in a documentary segment where he investigates a militant hate group called the HKs, led by a guy named Kevin (Mario Joyner) who hates himself. Chris and Cedric chit-chat about their lives. Nas performs "Come Get Me".
11	41	Ananda Lewis	Kelis	December 10, 1999
Cold open: An angry old man (Chris) gives an anti-HBO editorial. Chris displays some direct-to-video releases featuring rappers. A presidential campaign ad is shown for basketball player Tree Rollins. Chris and Ananda cover topics such as school shootings, sexism, and the difference between MTV and BET. A sponsor ad is shown for Make You Wait Hair Salon, which lives up to its name. A presidential ad for Bill Bradley is used as a counter-attack against Tree Rollins. Kelis performs "Caught Out There".
12	42	Marion Barry	Jay-Z	December 17, 1999

=== Season 5 (2000) ===
No. overall	No. in season	Interview Guest	Musical (or other) Guest	Original release date
1	43	Bernie Mac	Jill Scott	August 19, 2000
Cold open: CRTV News Correspondent Curl Jackson (Ali LeRoi) reports from Harlem, where the annual Running of the Cops begins.; Chris uses video clips to compare activities between the Republican and Democratic conventions, then shows his audition tape for Monday Night Football.; In a documentary segment, "Twelve Hours to Freedom", Chris starts an awareness campaign to free Bobby Brown from prison.; Chris and Bernie talk about his (Bernie's) lack of a TV show (though he would eventually gain one in 2001), along with such topics as racial profiling and police brutality.; Jill Scott performs "Getting in the Way".
2	44	Morgan Freeman	Lucy Pearl	August 26, 2000
Chris shows a teaser for the Source Awards with a lot of gunshots, followed by a trailer for a BET knockoff of Survivor.; Chris stars in his own reality show, "Halle Berry 911".; Chris and his Nurse Betty co-star Morgan Freeman talk about on-screen personalities.; Chris discusses Al Gore's popularity among African-Americans with political analyst A Black Guy (Ali LeRoi).; Lucy Pearl performs "Don't Mess with My Man".
3	45	Mablean Ephriam	Common	September 2, 2000
Cold open: An ad is shown for The Chiefs of Comedy, the Native American answer to The Original Kings of Comedy.; Chris displays a recalled talking doll of Richard Williams.; In a pre-taped segment, Chris interviews people on the street about reparations.; Chris and Mablean discuss issues relating to divorce.; In another ad, the Asian-Americans are next to jump on the bandwagon with The Emperors of Comedy.; Common performs "The Light".
4	46	Jamie Foxx	Boyz II Men	September 9, 2000
Cold open: An ad is shown: "Makin' Money – True."; Chris shows a clip from Khalid Muhammad's Million Youth March, then shows an ad for a new after school special, "Daddy Still Has a Flattop".; Chris and Jamie chit-chat about stardom.; Chris talks to Dr. Roberta Slacky (Wanda Sykes) about single women who decide not to marry.; Boyz II Men perform "Pass You By".
5	47	Stanley Crouch	De La Soul, Redman	September 23, 2000
Chris shows a new Democratic party ad with not-so-subtle subliminal messages about George W. Bush, then uses a felt chart in a lecture on black progress.; Chris and Stanley discuss the aforementioned issue of black progress.; De La Soul and Redman perform "Oooh.".
6	48	Kevin Johnson	Lil' Kim	September 30, 2000
Cold open: An ad is shown for Real Essence organic shampoo, which causes orgasms ... and pregnancy.; Chris lists some sports that were rejected by the IOC, then talks to Dr. Tom Silver (Tom Agna) about drug use amongst Olympic athletes.; In a pre-taped segment, Chris interviews people on the street about Barbra Streisand's retirement.; Chris talks to Kevin Johnson about sportscasting, basketball, and the 2000 United States presidential election.; Lil' Kim performs "Custom Made".
7	49	Pamela Anderson	Mystikal	October 7, 2000
Cold open: A presidential campaign ad for Mike Tyson is shown.; Chris shows previews of upcoming gay-themed programming, followed by a second presidential campaign ad for Mike Tyson.; In a pre-taped segment, Chris interviews people at the Republican National Convention in Philadelphia.; Chris and Pamela cover such topics as career moves and superficiality.; A third presidential campaign ad for Mike Tyson is shown.; Mystikal performs "Shake Ya Ass".
8	50	Bill Maher	Saul Williams	October 14, 2000
Chris displays some racist toys such as "Mr. Sweet Potato Head", "Pin the Evidence on the Brother", and the "Harass Me Pedro" doll.; In a pre-taped segment, Chris asks people whether they'll be attending the Million Family March.; Chris and Bill talk about Al Gore's presidential campaign, and Bill Clinton's legacy.; A commercial is shown for the "Dashboard Jesus Computerized Navigation System."; Saul Williams performs a poem.
9	51	Martin Lawrence	Sade	October 21, 2000
Marvin Shopwell (Tom Agna) reports live from the Middle East, where tensions are supposedly caused by the heat.; Chris hosts a training video, "How Not to Get Your Ass Kicked by the Police."; Martin talks to Chris about his recent recovery from a coma.; Chris moderates a debate between Reverend Rhonda Taylor (Wanda Sykes) and felon Larry X (Ali LeRoi) about violence in urban music.; Sade performs "By Your Side".
10	52	Jesse Jackson Jr.	Outkast	November 4, 2000
Ali LeRoi reports on the whereabouts of the ODB.; In a pre-taped segment, Chris asks people in the South Bronx whether they're benefiting from the recent economic boom.; Jesse Jackson Jr. talks to Chris about why people don't vote, and the possible outcome of the 2000 United States presidential election.; Outkast performs "Bombs Over Baghdad".
11	53	Cornel West	Adam Sandler	November 11, 2000
Cold open: A trailer is shown for a new drama film, "Migger, the Magic Nigger", from Ignent Pictures.; An irritated Wanda Sykes reports from election headquarters in Florida; she blames the voter fraud on the white man.; A commercial is shown for "Baby1 Credit", who will give you credit in exchange for your baby.; Cornel West talks to Chris about the history of the electoral college and the role it plays in the 2000 United States presidential election.; A commercial is shown for "Churchnik 2000", a music festival with a lot of Kirk Franklin.; Adam Sandler performs "She Comes Home to Me".
12	54	Al Sharpton	Jay-Z	November 18, 2000
Chris shows a clip from a UPN news report about the 2000 Presidential Election, in which the anchors move like they're in an R&B video as they talk.; An ad is shown for the Grown Man Man, who will rid your house of "pesky grown men who just won't leave home!"; Chris and Al Sharpton talk about the Florida election recount.; Savina Delvina (Wanda Sykes) stars in an infomercial for her hits, all of which have "My Man" in the title.; Jay-Z performs "I Just Wanna Love U (Give It 2 Me)".
13	55	Ice-T	Nikka Costa	November 25, 2000
Chris speaks via satellite to president-elect Pootie Tang, then presents a third installment of "Taxi Driver Confessions".; Chris and his New Jack City co-star Ice-T talk about censorship, violence and Ice's career on Law & Order.; More "Taxi Driver Confessions" are shown.; Nikka Costa performs "Like a Feather" (and later reveals a sequined top that reads "Chris Rock for President").

== Home media ==
There have been four DVD releases of The Chris Rock Show in Region 1. The two "Best of" DVDs that were released were later repackaged into a single compilation in 2005. Seasons 1 and 2 were released as a DVD set in 2006. Most of the episodes were released uncut, however for contractual reasons the segment featuring (The Artist Formerly Known as) Prince has been removed from the first episode of Season 1. The Seasons 1 and 2 DVD features a Chris Rock commentary on episodes 1 and 12.

DVD name	Length	Release date
The Best of the Chris Rock Show Volume One	59 minutes	August 31, 1999
The Best of the Chris Rock Show Volume Two	55 minutes	August 7, 2001
The Best of the Chris Rock Show Volumes 1 & 2	120 minutes	October 11, 2005
The Chris Rock Show Seasons 1 & 2	510 minutes	September 19, 2006
