= Chuck Sklar =

American comedian, film and television writer, and television producer

Chuck Sklar is an American comedian, film and television writer, and television producer. He is known for comedy writing on various shows, including The Chris Rock Show, The Man Show, and Weekends at the D.L. In 2012, Sklar and Chris Rock produced a pilot featuring San Francisco comedian, W. Kamau Bell, launching the FX television network show Totally Biased with W. Kamau Bell. Chuck Sklar was the lead role in Louis C.K.'s Tomorrow Night as Charles, a misanthropic photoshop owner. He also appeared in the 1997 independent comedy movie Who's the Caboose? starring Sarah Silverman.

Sklar is a poker enthusiast, winning over $150,000 in a 2010 Legends of Poker Tournament.
