= Ali LeRoi =

American actor

- Born: Chicago, Illinois, U.S.
- Education: Columbia College Chicago
- Occupations: Television producer, director, writer, actor
- Known for: Co-creator of Everybody Hates Chris
- Spouse: Adrienne LeRoi (1992–2019)
- Awards: NAACP Image Award for Outstanding Writing in a Comedy Series; Everybody Hates Chris (2008)

Ali LeRoi is an American television producer, director, writer and actor. He is best known as the co-creator of the Chris Rock semi-autobiographical sitcom Everybody Hates Chris, for which he won the NAACP Image Award for Outstanding Writing in a Comedy Series in 2008.

LeRoi met Rock during the set on his eponymous HBO late-night talk show in 1997. LeRoi wrote and directed several episodes of the series, on a team that earned four consecutive Emmy Award nominations (1998–2001) for "Outstanding Writing For A Variety, Music Or Comedy Program," winning that Emmy in 1999. In 2001, the talk show was also nominated for "Outstanding Variety, Music Or Comedy Series," citing LeRoi as a Supervising Producer.

A native of Chicago, LeRoi attended Robert Lindblom Math & Science Academy. He then studied film at Columbia College Chicago.

LeRoi also co-hosted the podcast called "Alias Smith and LeRoi" (2013–15) with comedian Owen H.M. Smith.

His debut feature film, The Obituary of Tunde Johnson, premiered at the 2019 Toronto International Film Festival.

LeRoi serves on the Board of Directors of Humanitas, a program of awards for film and television writers.
