= List of Robin Williams performances =

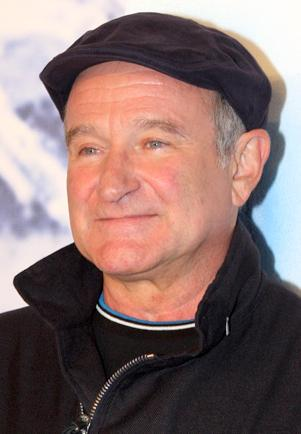
Williams in 2011

The American actor and comedian Robin Williams (1951–2014) starred in films, television and video games throughout a career that spanned nearly four decades. Known for his fast-paced, improvisational style and for playing a wide variety of characters, he was described by Screen Actors Guild president Ken Howard as "a performer of limitless versatility, equally adept at comedy and drama, whether scripted or improv". He is often regarded as one of the greatest comedians of all time.

Williams's career began in 1977 with minor roles in the film Can I Do It... 'Til I Need Glasses? and the television shows The Richard Pryor Show and Laugh-In. The guest role of an alien named Mork in a 1978 episode of the sitcom Happy Days earned him positive reviews, and led to the spin-off Mork & Mindy, focusing on his character's experiences on Earth. Running for four seasons, the show was Williams's breakthrough and earned him his first Golden Globe Award and a nomination for a Primetime Emmy Award. By the early 1980s, Williams wanted to do mainstream acting, and made his film debut in a lead role in the musical comedy Popeye (1980), a critical failure that earned thrice its budget. Williams then took on more serious parts in the comedy-dramas The World According to Garp (1982) and Moscow on the Hudson (1984). He won two consecutive Primetime Emmy Awards for Outstanding Individual Performance in a Variety or Music Program for the television specials Carol, Carl, Whoopi and Robin (1987) and ABC Presents A Royal Gala (1988). He received his first of three Academy Award for Best Actor nominations for playing disc jockey Adrian Cronauer in the war comedy Good Morning, Vietnam (1987), in which he improvised some of his scenes.

Further critical acclaim followed with Williams's lead roles in Dead Poets Society (1989), Awakenings (1990) and The Fisher King (1991). He also found greater commercial success in the 1990s. Many of his films during this period grossed more than $100 million, including the fantasy Hook (1991), the animated musical Aladdin (1992), the comedy-drama Mrs. Doubtfire (1993), the adventure Jumanji (1995) and the comedy The Birdcage (1996). Aladdin, in which he improvised 52 characters, was the highest-grossing film of the year. Mrs. Doubtfire, which he also produced, won him a third Golden Globe Award for Best Actor – Motion Picture Musical or Comedy; he had previously won for Good Morning, Vietnam and The Fisher King. While hailed "the funniest person alive" by Entertainment Weekly in 1997, Williams wanted to do more serious work as an actor around this time. Such opportunities arose with the roles of a therapist in the psychological drama Good Will Hunting (1997) and a man in heaven who attempts to save his wife from hell in the fantasy drama What Dreams May Come (1998). The former won him the Academy Award for Best Supporting Actor.

In the 2000s, Williams continued to do voice roles, including in A.I. Artificial Intelligence (2001), Robots (2005) and Happy Feet (2006, and its 2011 sequel). Pursuing more diverse parts, he took on the darker roles of an emotionally disturbed photo developer in One Hour Photo (2002), a writer who is involved in the murder of a teenage girl in Insomnia (2002) and a radio host who is caught up with a troubled fan in The Night Listener (2006). He returned to comedy in 2006 with the family adventure RV, the satire Man of the Year and the fantasy Night at the Museum. The latter was the fifth-highest-grossing film of the year and spawned two sequels in 2009 and 2014. He began touring for the one-man stand-up comedy show Weapons of Self Destruction (2008), focusing on "social and political absurdities", and starred in the Disney film Old Dogs (2009). In the 2010s, he starred in the sitcom The Crazy Ones (2013–2014), played supporting roles in the 2013 features The Big Wedding and The Butler, and had three films released posthumously, including the sequel Night at the Museum: Secret of the Tomb.

== Film ==
Table featuring feature films with Robin Williams
Year	Title	Role	Notes	Ref(s)
1977	Can I Do It... 'Til I Need Glasses?	Lawyer / Man with Tooth Ache	Film debut	
1980	Popeye	Popeye		
1982	The World According to Garp	T.S. Garp		
1983	The Survivors	Donald Quinelle		
1984	Moscow on the Hudson	Vladimir Ivanov		
1986	The Best of Times	Jack Dundee		
1986	Club Paradise	Jack Moniker		
1986	Seize the Day	Tommy Wilhelm		
1987	Good Morning, Vietnam	Adrian Cronauer		
1988	The Adventures of Baron Munchausen	King of the Moon	Credited as Ray D. Tutto	
1988	Portrait of a White Marriage	Air Conditioning Salesman	Uncredited cameo	
1989	Dead Poets Society	John Keating		
1990	Cadillac Man	Joey O'Brien		
1990	Awakenings	Dr. Malcolm Sayer		
1991	Shakes the Clown	Mime Jerry, Class Instructor	Cameo appearance; Credited as Marty Fromage	
1991	Dead Again	Doctor Cozy Carlisle		
1991	The Fisher King	Henry "Parry" Sagan		
1991	Hook	Peter Banning / Peter Pan		
1992	FernGully: The Last Rainforest	Batty Koda	Voice role	
1992	Aladdin	Genie, Peddler	Voice role	
1992	Toys	Leslie Zevo		
1993	Mrs. Doubtfire	Daniel Hillard / Euphegenia Doubtfire	Also producer	
1994	Being Human	Hector		
1995	Nine Months	Dr. Kosevich		
1995	To Wong Foo, Thanks for Everything! Julie Newmar	John Jacob Jingleheimer Schmidt	Uncredited cameo	
1995	Jumanji	Alan Parrish		
1996	The Birdcage	Armand Goldman		
1996	The Truth About Cats & Dogs	Second Radio Caller	Voice role; Uncredited	
1996	Jack	Jack Powell		
1996	Aladdin and the King of Thieves	Genie, Peddler, Thor	Voice role; Direct-to-video	
1996	The Secret Agent	The Professor	Uncredited	
1996	Hamlet	Osric		
1997	Fathers' Day	Dale Putley		
1997	Deconstructing Harry	Mel		
1997	Flubber	Professor Philip Brainard		
1997	Good Will Hunting	Sean Maguire		
1998	What Dreams May Come	Chris Nielsen		
1998	Patch Adams	Patch Adams		
1999	Jakob the Liar	Jakob Heym	Also executive producer	
1999	Bicentennial Man	Andrew Martin		
1999	Get Bruce	Himself	Documentary	
2001	A.I. Artificial Intelligence	Dr. Know	Voice role; Cameo appearance	
2002	One Hour Photo	Seymour "Sy" Parrish		
2002	Death to Smoochy	"Rainbow" Randolph Smiley		
2002	Insomnia	Walter Finch		
2004	The Final Cut	Alan W. Hakman		
2004	House of D	Pappass		
2004	Noel	Charlie Boyd / The Priest	Uncredited	
2005	Robots	Fender Pinwheeler	Voice role	
2005	The Big White	Paul Barnell		
2005	The Aristocrats	Himself	Documentary	
2006	The Night Listener	Gabriel Noone		
2006	RV	Bob Munro		
2006	Everyone's Hero	Napoleon Cross	Voice role; Uncredited	
2006	Man of the Year	Tom Dobbs		
2006	Happy Feet	Ramon, Lovelace	Voice role	
2006	Night at the Museum	Theodore Roosevelt		
2007	License to Wed	Reverend Frank		
2007	August Rush	Maxwell "Wizard" Wallace		
2009	World's Greatest Dad	Lance Clayton		
2009	Shrink	Jack Holden		
2009	Night at the Museum: Battle of the Smithsonian	Theodore Roosevelt / Theodore Roosevelt Bust (voice)		
2009	Old Dogs	Dan Rayburn		
2011	Happy Feet Two	Ramon, Lovelace, Narrator	Voice role	
2013	The Big Wedding	Father Monighan		
2013	The Butler	Dwight D. Eisenhower		
2013	The Face of Love	Roger		
2014	Boulevard	Nolan Mack		
2014	The Angriest Man in Brooklyn	Henry Altmann		
2014	A Merry Friggin' Christmas	Mitch Mitchler	Released posthumously	
2014	Night at the Museum: Secret of the Tomb	Theodore Roosevelt, Garuda (voice)	Released posthumously	
2014	Chew	Mason Savoy (voice)	Unreleased; partial recording; lines re-recorded by David Tennant	
2015	Absolutely Anything	Dennis the Dog	Voice role; Released posthumously	

== Television ==
Table featuring television programs with Robin Williams
Year	Title	Role	Notes	Ref(s)
1977	Sorority '62	Henry	Television pilot	
1977	The Richard Pryor Show	Various characters	2 episodes	
1977	Rowan & Martin's Laugh-In	Regular performer		
1977	Eight Is Enough	Band Member	Episode: "The Return of Auntie V"	
1978	America 2-Night	Jason Shine	2 episodes	
1978–1979	Happy Days	Mork	2 episodes	
1978–1982	Mork & Mindy	Mork		
1979	Out of the Blue	Mork	Episode: "Random's Arrival"	
1982	E.T. and Friends: Magical Movie Visitors	Himself (host)	Television special	
1982	Faerie Tale Theatre	Frog/Prince Robin	Episode: "Tale of the Frog Prince"	
1982	SCTV Network	Various characters	Episode: "Jane Eyrehead"	
1982–1983	Mork & Mindy/Laverne & Shirley/Fonz Hour	Mork (voice)		
1984	Saturday Night Live	Himself (host)	Episode: "Robin Williams/Adam Ant"	
1984	Pryor's Place	Gaby	Episode: "Sax Education"	
1986	58th Academy Awards	Himself (co-host)	Television special	
1986	Saturday Night Live	Himself (host)	Episode: "Robin Williams/Paul Simon"	
1987	Carol, Carl, Whoopi and Robin	Various characters	Television special	
1987	Dear America: Letters Home from Vietnam	Baby-san (voice)	Documentary	
1988	Saturday Night Live	Himself (host)	Episode: "Robin Williams/James Taylor"	
1990	The Earth Day Special	Everyman	Television special	
1990–2012	Sesame Street	Himself		
1991	A Wish for Wings That Work	The Kiwi (voice)	Television special; Credited as Sudy Nim	
1992, 1994	The Larry Sanders Show	Himself	2 episodes	
1994	Homicide: Life on the Street	Robert Ellison	Episode: "Bop Gun"	
1994	In Search of Dr. Seuss	The Father	Television film	
1997	Friends	Tomas	Uncredited; Episode: "The One with the Ultimate Fighting Champion"	
1999	L.A. Doctors	Hugo Kinsley	Episode: "Just Duet"	
2000	Whose Line Is It Anyway?	Himself	1 episode	
2002	The Rutles 2: Can't Buy Me Lunch	Hans Hänkie	Television film	
2003	Freedom: A History of Us	Josiah Quincy; Ulysses S. Grant; Missouri farmer; Wilbur Wright; Orville Wright	4 episodes	
2003	Life with Bonnie	Kevin Powalski	Episode: "Psychic"	
2008	Law & Order: Special Victims Unit	Merritt Rook	Episode: "Authority"	
2009	SpongeBob SquarePants	Himself	Episode: "SpongeBob's Truth or Square"	
2010	Saturday Night Live	Himself	Episode: "Robert De Niro/Diddy – Dirty Money"	
2012	Wilfred	Dr. Eddy / Himself	Episode: "Progress"	
2012	Louie	Himself	Episode: "Barney/Never"	
2013–2014	The Crazy Ones	Simon Roberts		
2023	Once Upon a Studio	Genie	archival footage	

== Theater ==
Table featuring theatre roles with Robin Williams
Year(s)	Title	Role	Venue	Ref(s)
1988	Waiting for Godot	Estragon	Lincoln Center Theatre, New York	
2011	Bengal Tiger at the Baghdad Zoo	Tiger	Richard Rodgers Theatre, Broadway	

== Music videos ==
Table featuring music video roles of Robin Williams
Year	Title	Role	Notes	Ref(s)
1988	"Don't Worry, Be Happy"	Himself	Music video; Bobby McFerrin	
2011	"You Make Me Feel..."	Guy In Photobooth	Music video; Cobra Starship featuring Sabi	

== Theme parks ==
Table featuring voiceover roles at theme parks with Robin Williams
Year	Title	Role	Venue	Ref(s)
1989	Back to Never Land	Robin	The Magic of Disney Animation in Disney's Hollywood Studios, Lake Buena Vista, Florida	
1992	The Timekeeper	Timekeeper	Magic Kingdom, Lake Buena Vista, Florida	
2002	Journey Into Imagination with Figment	Professor Phillip Brainard	Epcot, Bay Lake, Florida	

== Video games ==
Table featuring video game roles of Robin Williams
Year	Title	Role	Ref(s)
1997	Disney's Math Quest with Aladdin	Genie (voice)	

== Video recordings ==
Table featuring video recordings with Robin Williams
Year	Title	Ref(s)
1978	Off the Wall / Live at the Roxy	
1983	An Evening with Robin Williams	
1986	Robin Williams: An Evening at the Met	
2002	Robin Williams: Live on Broadway	
2009	Weapons of Self Destruction	

== See also ==
- List of awards and nominations received by Robin Williams

== Sources ==
- Ausiello, Michael (2005), TV Guide: Guide to TV (2006), New York: Barnes & Noble, ISBN 978-0-7607-7572-1
- Erikson, Hal (2007), Sid and Marty Krofft: A Critical Study of Saturday Morning Children's Television, 1969–1993, Jefferson, North Carolina: McFarland & Company, ISBN 978-0-7864-3093-2
- Herbert, Emily (2014), Robin Williams: When the Laughter Stops, 1951–2014, London: John Blake Publishing, ISBN 978-1-7841-8339-4, OCLC 889523094
- Itzkoff, Dave (2018), Robin, New York: Henry Holt and Company, ISBN 978-1-6277-9425-1
- Jagtenberg, Tom; McKie, David (1996), Eco-Impacts and the Greening of Postmodernity: New Maps for Communication Studies, Cultural Studies, and Sociology, Thousand Oaks, California: SAGE Publishing, ISBN 978-1-4522-4852-3
- Johnson, Lauren (2003), Friends: The One About the #1 Sitcom, New York: New American Library, ISBN 978-0-4512-0967-2
- Leszczak, Bob (2012), Single Season Sitcoms, 1948–1979: A Complete Guide, Jefferson, North Carolina: McFarland & Company, Inc., ISBN 978-078-6-4681-26
- Shaffer, Joshua (2017), Discovering the Magic Kingdom: An Unofficial Disneyland Vacation Guide (New Enhanced 2nd Edition), Garden Grove, California: Synergy Books Publishing, ISBN 978-0-9991-6640-6
- Spignesi, Stephen (2020), Robin Williams, American Master: The Movies and Art of a Lost Genius, Post Hill Press, ISBN 978-1-6429-3530-1
- Spignesi, Stephen J. (1997), The Robin Williams Scrapbook, Secaucus, New Jersey: Simon & Schuster, ISBN 978-0-8065-1891-6
- Terrance, Vincent (2013). Television Specials: 5,336 Entertainment Programs, 1936–2012 (5 ed.). Jefferson, North Carolina: Ballantine Books, McFarland & Company. ISBN 978-1-4766-1240-9. OCLC 844373010.
- Vagnini, Steve; Smith, Dave (2023), Disney A to Z: The Official Encyclopedia, New York: Random House Worlds, ISBN 978-1-3680-6191-9
