= List of awards and nominations received by Robin Williams =

Robin Williams awards and nominations
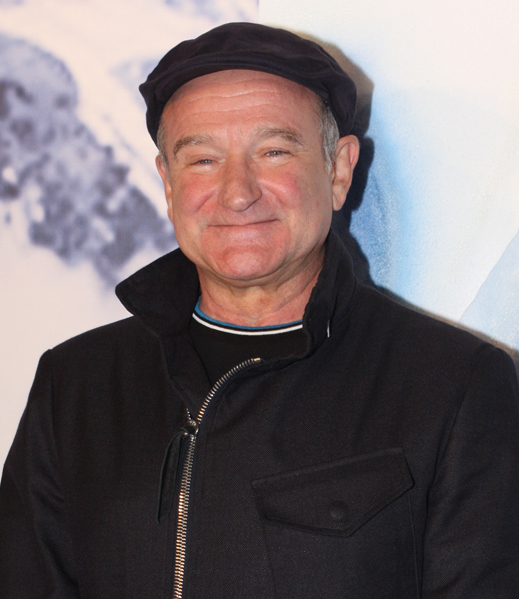
- Williams at the Happy Feet Two (2011) premiere in Australia
Awards and nominations
Award	Wins	Nominations
Academy Award	1	4
BAFTA Awards	0	2
Emmy Awards	2	9
Golden Globe Awards	6	12
Grammy Awards	5	9
Screen Actors Guild Awards	2	4

Totals (Note: Certain award groups do not simply award one winner. They acknowledge several different recipients, have runners-up, and have third place. Since this is a specific recognition and is different from losing an award, runner-up mentions are considered wins in this award tally. For simplification and to avoid errors, each award in this list has been presumed to have had a prior nomination.)
- Wins: 77
- Nominations: 106

The following is a list of awards and nominations received by Robin Williams.

Robin Williams (1951–2014) was an American actor and comedian. Over his career he has received several awards including an Academy Award, two Primetime Emmy Awards, six Golden Globe Awards, five Grammy Awards, and two Screen Actors Guild Awards.

Williams started his career as a standup comedian, receiving nine Grammy Award nominations and winning four for Best Comedy Album for Reality ... What a Concept (1980), A Night at the Met (1986), Good Morning, Vietnam (1987), and Robin Williams - Live in 2002. He also gained a national audience portraying the alien Mork in the ABC sitcom Mork & Mindy (1978–1982), where he earned a nomination for the Primetime Emmy Award for Outstanding Lead Actor in a Comedy Series. He went on to receive nine Emmy Award nominations, winning twice for Outstanding Performance in a Variety or Music Program for Carol, Carl, Whoopi and Robin (1987), and ABC Presents A Royal Gala (1988).

For his work on film, he won the Academy Award for Best Supporting Actor for his role as a psychology professor in the drama Good Will Hunting (1997) directed by Gus Van Sant and co-written by Matt Damon and Ben Affleck. He was Oscar-nominated for playing radio personality Adrian Cronauer in the war comedy Good Morning, Vietnam (1987), John Keating, inspirational English teacher in the coming-of-age drama film Dead Poets Society (1989), and an eccentric homeless man in the comedy-drama film The Fisher King (1991).

Williams also won six Golden Globe Awards, including Best Actor in a Motion Picture – Musical or Comedy for his roles in Good Morning, Vietnam (1987), The Fisher King (1991) and Mrs. Doubtfire (1993), along with the Special Golden Globe Award for Vocal Work in a Motion Picture for his role Genie in Aladdin (1992), and Cecil B. DeMille award in 2005. He won two Screen Actors Guild Awards for Outstanding Ensemble for The Birdcage (1996), and Outstanding Supporting Actor for Good Will Hunting (1997). In 2009, he received the Disney Legend Award.

== Major associations ==
=== Academy Awards ===
Year	Category	Nominated work	Result	Ref.
1988	Best Actor	Good Morning, Vietnam	Nominated	
1990	Best Actor	Dead Poets Society	Nominated	
1992	Best Actor	The Fisher King	Nominated	
1998	Best Supporting Actor	Good Will Hunting	Won	

=== BAFTA Awards ===
Year	Category	Nominated work	Result	Ref.
British Academy Film Awards
1989	Best Film Actor in a Leading Role	Good Morning, Vietnam	Nominated	
1990	Best Film Actor in a Leading Role	Dead Poets Society	Nominated	

=== Emmy Awards ===
Year	Category	Nominated work	Result	Ref.
Primetime Emmy Awards
1979	Outstanding Lead Actor in a Comedy Series	Mork & Mindy	Nominated	
1987	Outstanding Performance in a Variety or Music Program	Carol, Carl, Whoopi and Robin	Won	
1988	Outstanding Performance in a Variety or Music Program	ABC Presents A Royal Gala	Won	
1994	Outstanding Guest Actor in a Drama Series	Homicide: Life on the Street	Nominated	
1996	Outstanding Performance in a Variety or Music Program	Comic Relief VII	Nominated	
2003	Outstanding Performance in a Variety or Music Program	Robin Williams: Live on Broadway	Nominated	
2003	Outstanding Writing for a Variety Special	Robin Williams: Live on Broadway	Nominated	
2008	Outstanding Guest Actor in a Drama Series	Law & Order: Special Victims Unit	Nominated	
2010	Outstanding Variety, Music, or Comedy Special	Robin Williams: Weapons Of Self Destruction	Nominated	

=== Golden Globe Awards ===
Year	Category	Nominated work	Result	Ref.
1979	Best Actor in a Television Series – Musical or Comedy	Mork & Mindy	Won	
1980	Best Actor in a Television Series – Musical or Comedy	Mork & Mindy	Nominated	
1985	Best Actor in a Motion Picture – Musical or Comedy	Moscow on the Hudson	Nominated	
1988	Best Actor in a Motion Picture – Musical or Comedy	Good Morning, Vietnam	Won	
1990	Best Actor in a Motion Picture – Drama	Dead Poets Society	Nominated	
1991	Best Actor in a Motion Picture – Drama	Awakenings	Nominated	
1992	Best Actor in a Motion Picture – Musical or Comedy	The Fisher King	Won	
1993	Special Achievement Award (Note: (for his role Genie))	Aladdin	Honored	
1994	Best Actor in a Motion Picture – Musical or Comedy	Mrs. Doubtfire	Won	
1998	Best Supporting Actor – Motion Picture	Good Will Hunting	Nominated	
1999	Best Actor in a Motion Picture – Musical or Comedy	Patch Adams	Nominated	
2005	Cecil B. DeMille Award	—N/a	Honored	

=== Grammy Awards ===
Year	Category	Nominated work	Result	Ref.
1980	Best New Artist	—N/a	Nominated	
1980	Best Comedy Album	Reality...What a Concept	Won	
1984	Best Comedy Album	Throbbing Python of Love	Nominated	
1988	Best Comedy Album	A Night at the Met	Won	
1989	Best Comedy Album	Good Morning, Vietnam	Won	
1989	Best Children's Album	Pecos Bill	Won	
1997	Best Spoken Word Album for Children	Jumanji	Nominated	
2003	Best Spoken Word Comedy Album	Robin Williams Live - 2002	Won	
2011	Best Comedy Album	Weapons of Self Destruction	Nominated	

=== Screen Actors Guild Awards ===
Year	Category	Nominated work	Result	Ref.
1997	Outstanding Ensemble Cast in a Motion Picture	The Birdcage	Won	
1998	Outstanding Supporting Actor in a Motion Picture	Good Will Hunting	Won	
1998	Outstanding Ensemble Cast in a Motion Picture	Good Will Hunting	Nominated	
2014	Outstanding Ensemble Cast in a Motion Picture	The Butler	Nominated	

== Critics awards ==
Year	Award	Category	Nominated work	Result
1990	American Comedy Award	Funniest Supporting Actor in a Motion Picture	The Adventures of Baron Munchausen	Nominated
1990	Jupiter Award	Best International Actor	Dead Poets Society	Won
1990	David di Donatello Award	Best Foreign Actor	Dead Poets Society	Nominated
1991	National Board of Review	Best Actor (shared with Robert De Niro)	Awakenings	Won
1991	Chicago Film Critics Association	Best Actor	Awakenings	Nominated
1998	Awards Circuit Community Award	Best Supporting Actor	Good Will Hunting	Won
2003	Broadcast Film Critics Association	Best Actor	One Hour Photo	Nominated
2003	Dallas-Fort Worth Film Critics Association	Best Actor	One Hour Photo	Nominated
2003	Online Film Critics Society	Best Actor	One Hour Photo	Nominated
2006	Visual Effects Society Award	Outstanding Voice Performance - Animated Film	Robots	Nominated
2014	Critics' Choice Television Award	Best Actor in a Comedy Series	The Crazy Ones	Nominated

== Miscellaneous awards ==
Organizations	Year	Category	Project	Result	Ref.
Golden Raspberry Awards	1999	Worst Actor	Bicentennial Man	Nominated	
Golden Raspberry Awards	1999	Worst Actor	Jakob the Liar	Nominated	
Golden Raspberry Awards	2002	Worst Supporting Actor	Death to Smoochy	Nominated	
Kids' Choice Awards	1994	Favorite Movie Actor	Mrs. Doubtfire	Won	
Kids' Choice Awards	1996	Favorite Movie Actor	Jumanji	Nominated	
Kids' Choice Awards	1997	Favorite Movie Actor	Jack	Nominated	
Kids' Choice Awards	1998	Favorite Movie Actor	Flubber	Nominated	
Kids' Choice Awards	2000	Favorite Movie Actor	Bicentennial Man	Nominated	
Kids' Choice Awards	2006	Favorite Voice from an Animated Feature	Robots	Nominated	
MTV Awards	1992	Best Performance in a Movie	The Fisher King	Nominated	
MTV Awards	1993	Best Comedic Performance in a Movie	Aladdin	Won	
MTV Awards	1994	Best Comedic Performance in a Movie	Mrs. Doubtfire	Won	
MTV Awards	1994	Best Performance in a Movie	Mrs. Doubtfire	Nominated	
MTV Awards	1997	Best Comedic Performance in a Movie	The Birdcage	Nominated	
MTV Awards	1997	Best On-Screen Duo or Team in a Movie (Shared with Nathan Lane)	The Birdcage	Nominated	
Online Film & TV Association	1998	Best Supporting Actor	Good Will Hunting	Nominated	
Online Film & TV Association	2003	Best Actor	One Hour Photo	Nominated	
Online Film & TV Association	2007	Best Voice-Over Performance	Happy Feet	Nominated	
Satellite Awards	1998	Best Supporting Actor in a Motion Picture	Good Will Hunting	Nominated	
Satellite Awards	1999	Best Actor in a Motion Picture	Patch Adams	Nominated	
Satellite Awards	2003	Best Actor in a Motion Picture	One Hour Photo	Nominated	
Saturn Awards	1992	Best Film Lead Actor	The Fisher King	Nominated	
Saturn Awards	1993	Best Film Lead Actor	Toys	Nominated	
Saturn Awards	1993	Best Film Supporting Actor	Aladdin	Won	
Saturn Awards	1996	Best Film Lead Actor	Jumanji	Nominated	
Saturn Awards	2003	Best Film Supporting Actor	Insomnia	Nominated	
Saturn Awards	2003	Best Film Lead Actor	One Hour Photo	Won	

== Honorary awards ==
Year	Category	Nominated work	Result	Ref.
1995	American Academy of Achievement	Golden Plate Award for The Arts	Honored	
2009	Disney Legends	Film & Animation — Voice	Honored	

== See also ==
- Robin Williams filmography
