= Robin Williams =

American actor and comedian (1951–2014)

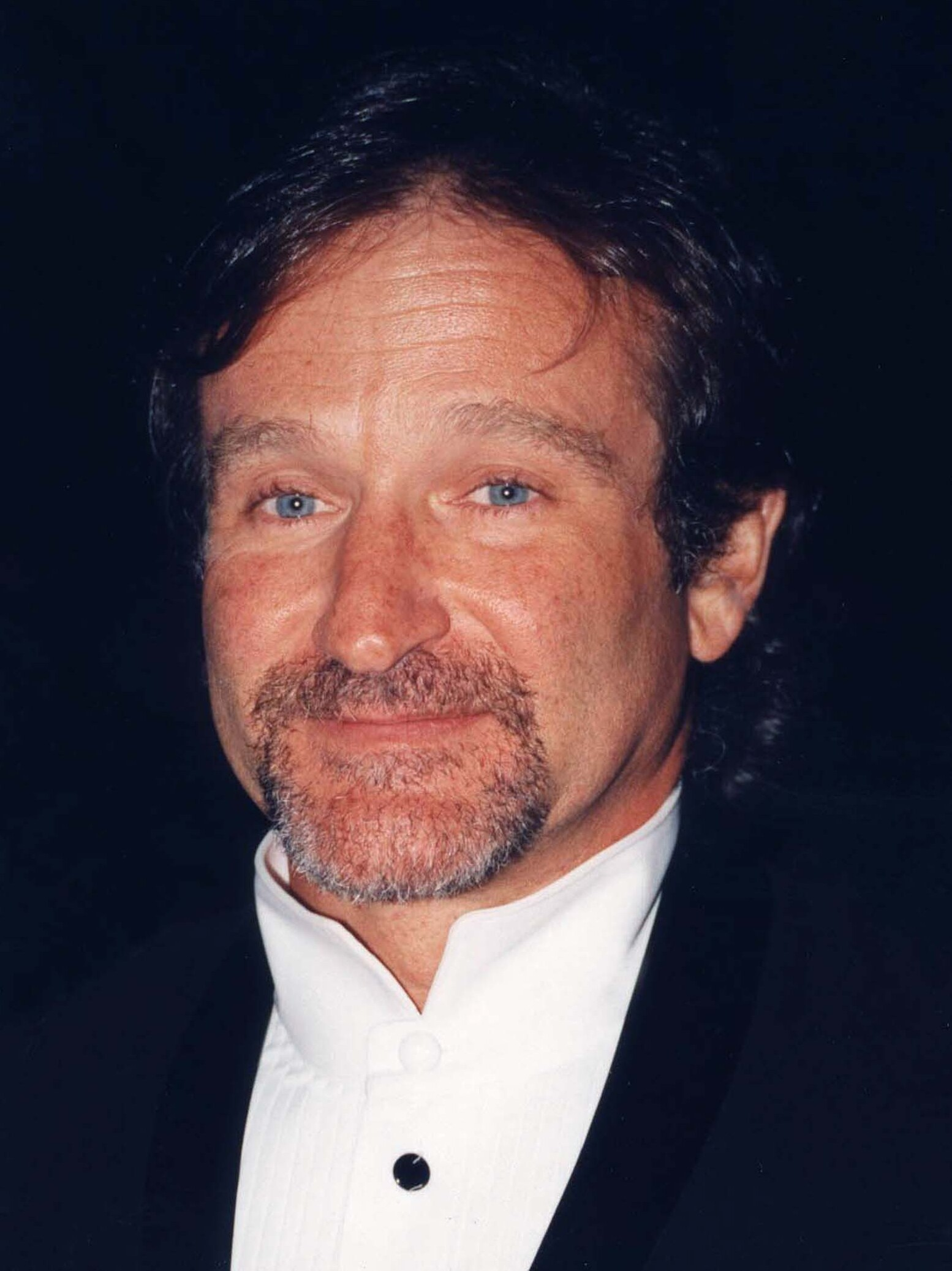
- Williams in 1996
- Born: Robin McLaurin Williams; July 21, 1951; Chicago, Illinois, U.S.
- Died: August 11, 2014 (aged 63); Paradise Cay, California, U.S.
- Occupations: Actor; comedian
- Years active: 1976–2014
- Works: Full list
- Spouses: Valerie Velardi (m. 1978; div. 1988) Marsha Garces (m. 1989; div. 2010) Susan Schneider (m. 2011)
- Children: 3, including Zelda
- Relatives: Anselm J. McLaurin (great-great grandfather)
- Awards: Full list

Comedy career
- Medium: Stand-up; film; television
- Genres: Observational comedy; improvisational comedy; physical comedy; impressions; self-deprecation; surreal humor; satire; stand-up
- Robin Williams's voice On September 30, 1988, the Space Shuttle Discovery (STS-26) crew started its day with a wakeup call from Williams imitating his character Adrian Cronauer in the 1987 film Good Morning, Vietnam.

Robin McLaurin Williams (July 21, 1951 – August 11, 2014) was an American actor and comedian. Known for his improvisational skills and the wide variety of characters he created spontaneously and portrayed in drama and comedy films, he is regarded as one of the greatest comedians of all time. Williams received numerous accolades including an Academy Award, two Primetime Emmy Awards, and six Golden Globe Awards, as well as five Grammy Awards and two Screen Actors Guild Awards. He was awarded the Cecil B. DeMille Award in 2005.

Born in Chicago, Williams began performing stand-up comedy in San Francisco and Los Angeles during the mid-1970s, and released several comedy albums including Reality ... What a Concept in 1980. He rose to fame playing the alien Mork in the ABC sitcom Mork & Mindy (1978–1982). Williams received his first leading film role in Popeye (1980). He won the Academy Award for Best Supporting Actor for Good Will Hunting (1997). His other Oscar-nominated roles were for Good Morning, Vietnam (1987), Dead Poets Society (1989), and The Fisher King (1991).

Williams starred in the critically acclaimed dramas The World According to Garp (1982), Moscow on the Hudson (1984), Awakenings (1990), and World's Greatest Dad (2009), as well as the psychological thrillers Insomnia (2002) and One Hour Photo (2002). His feature film comedies and family films included Hook (1991), Toys (1992), Mrs. Doubtfire (1993), Jumanji (1995), The Birdcage, Jack (both 1996), Flubber (1997), Patch Adams (1998), RV (2006), and the Night at the Museum series (2006–2014). He provided voice work in the animated films Aladdin (1992), Robots (2005), Happy Feet (2006), and Happy Feet Two (2011).

During his final years, Williams struggled with severe depression before his 2014 suicide at age 63. (Note: Most news sources at the time incorrectly reported that Williams died in Tiburon, California, which is located on the same peninsula (Tiburon) and surrounds Paradise Cay, which is where his house was located. Sky News correctly reported that Williams died in Paradise Cay.) According to his widow, Williams had been diagnosed with Parkinson's disease, and had been experiencing depression, anxiety, and increasing paranoia. His autopsy found "diffuse Lewy body disease" whose symptoms professionals said were consistent with dementia with Lewy bodies. In the weeks following his death by suicide, Williams was celebrated in a wave of tributes.

== Early life and education ==
Robin McLaurin Williams was born on July 21, 1951, (Note: Sources conflict: Some sources, including The Robin Williams Scrapbook as well as two print biographies, The Life and Humor of Robin Williams: A Biography and Robin Williams: A Biography, give his birth year as 1952. However, in an interview published on July 4, 2007, Williams refers to himself as being "55" He also verifies his date of birth as July 21, 1951, for a fansite interview in 2008.) at St. Luke's Hospital in Chicago, Illinois. His father, Robert Fitzgerald Williams (1906–1987), was a senior executive in Ford's Lincoln-Mercury Division. His mother, Laurie McLaurin (1922–2001), was a former model from Jackson, Mississippi, whose great-grandfather was Mississippi senator and governor Anselm J. McLaurin. Williams had two older half-brothers: a paternal half-brother, Robert (also known as Todd), and a maternal half-brother, McLaurin. While his mother was a practitioner of Christian Science, Williams was raised in his father's Episcopal faith. During a television interview on Inside the Actors Studio in 2001, Williams credited his mother as an important early influence on his humor, and said he tried to make her laugh to gain attention.

Williams attended public elementary school at Gorton Elementary School in Lake Forest and later Deer Path Junior High School. He described himself as a quiet child who did not overcome his shyness until becoming involved with his high school drama department, while friends recalled him as being very funny. In late 1963, when Williams was 12, his father was transferred to Detroit. The family lived in a 40-room farmhouse on 20 acres (8 ha) in suburban Bloomfield Hills, Michigan, where Williams attended the private all-boys Detroit Country Day School. He excelled academically, served as class president, and was on the school's wrestling team, but was also bullied for his weight and would play at home by himself.

With both parents working, Williams was partly raised by the family's maid, who was his main companion. When Williams was 16, his father took early retirement and the family moved to Tiburon, California. Following their move, Williams attended Redwood High School in nearby Larkspur. Williams described the school as Gestalt; he went on to join the drama club, becoming involved in theater, which first helped foster his interest in arts and entertainment. At the time of his graduation in 1969, he was voted "Most Likely Not to Succeed" and "Funniest" by his classmates. After high school graduation, Williams enrolled at Claremont Men's College in Claremont, California, to study political science; he dropped out to pursue acting. Williams studied theater for three years at the College of Marin, a community college in Kentfield, California. According to the College of Marin's drama professor, James Dunn, the depth of the young actor's talent became evident when Williams was cast in the musical Oliver! as Fagin. He often improvised during his time in the drama program, leaving cast members in hysterics. Dunn called his wife after one late rehearsal to tell her Williams "was going to be something special."

In 1973, Williams attained a full scholarship to the Juilliard School (Group 6, 1973–1976) in New York City. He was one of 20 students accepted into the freshman class, and Williams and Christopher Reeve were the only two accepted by John Houseman for the school's Advanced Program that year. Williams's classmates included William Hurt and Mandy Patinkin. According to biographer Jean Dorsinville, Franklyn Seales and Williams were roommates at Juilliard. Reeve recalled his first impression of Williams when they were new students at Juilliard: "He wore tie-dyed shirts with tracksuit bottoms and talked a mile a minute. I'd never seen so much energy contained in one person. He was like an untied balloon that had been inflated and immediately released. I watched in awe as he virtually caromed off the walls of the classrooms and hallways. To say that he was 'on' would be a major understatement."

Williams and Reeve had a class in dialects taught by Edith Skinner, who Reeve said was one of the world's leading voice and speech teachers. According to Reeve, Skinner was bewildered by Williams and his ability to instantly perform in many different accents.

Their primary acting teacher was Michael Kahn, who was "equally baffled by this human dynamo." Williams already had a reputation for being funny, but Kahn criticized his antics as simple stand-up comedy. In a later production, Williams silenced his critics with his well-received performance as an old man in Tennessee Williams's Night of the Iguana. Reeve wrote, "He simply was the old man. I was astonished by his work and very grateful that fate had thrown us together." The two remained close friends until Reeve's death in 2004. Their friendship was like "brothers from another mother," according to Williams's son Zak.

During the summers of 1974 to 1976, Williams worked as a busboy at The Trident in Sausalito, California. He left Juilliard during his junior year in 1976, following Houseman's suggestion that the school had nothing more they could teach him. Gerald Freedman, another of his teachers at Juilliard, called Williams a "genius" and that the school's conservative and classical style of training did not suit him; to those who knew him, it came as no surprise that Williams left.

== Career ==
=== 1976–1982: Stand-up comedy and Mork & Mindy ===
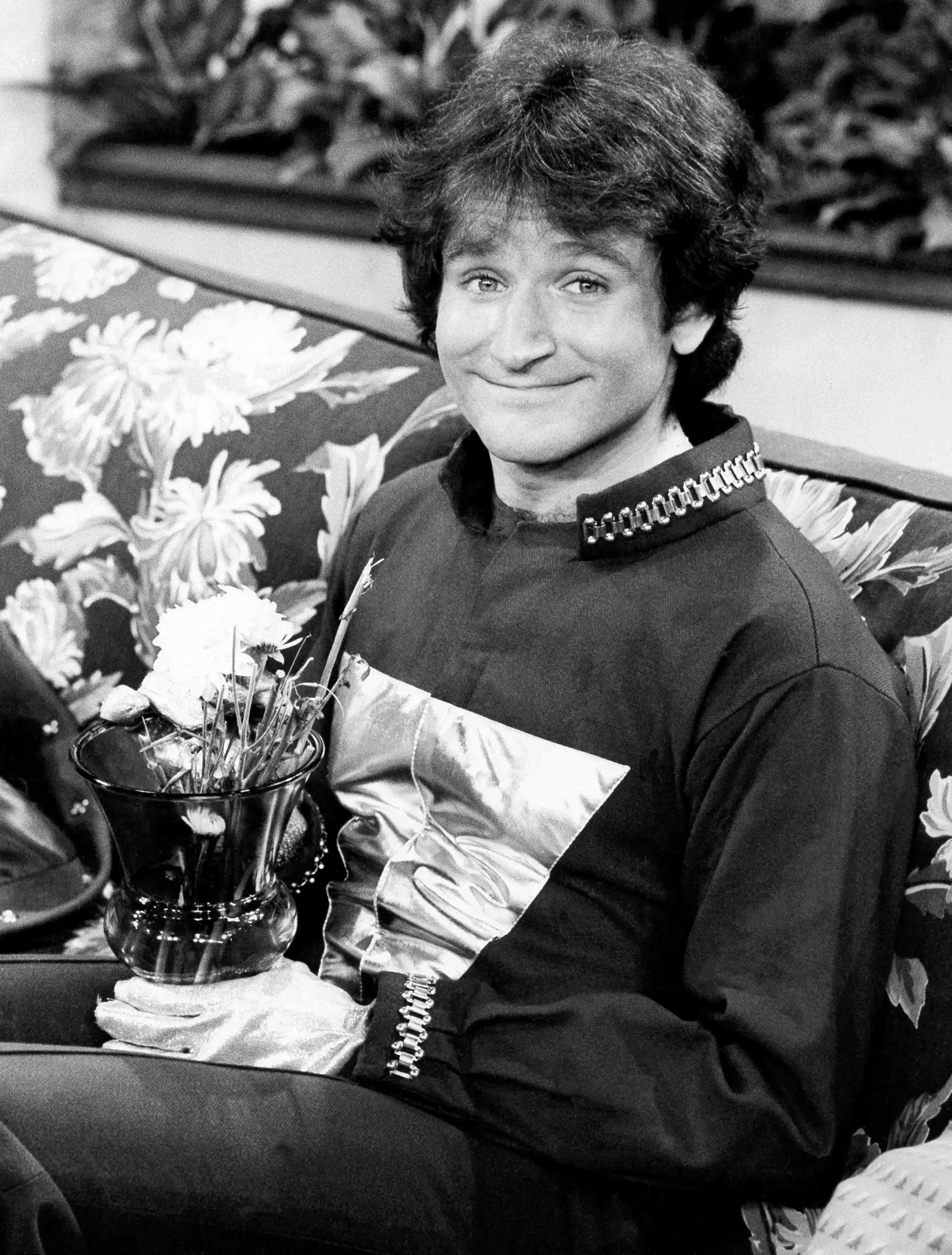
Robin Williams stars as Mork on ABC Television's Mork & Mindy, 1978.

Williams began performing stand-up comedy in the San Francisco Bay Area in 1976. His first performance took place at the Holy City Zoo, a San Francisco comedy club where he worked his way up from tending bar. During the 1960s, San Francisco had been a hub for rock music, the hippie movement, drugs, and a sexual revolution. By the late 1970s, Williams played a leading role in what critic Gerald Nachman described as the city's "comedy renaissance." Reflecting on that era, Williams said that he found out about "drugs and happiness" during that period, adding that he saw "the best brains of my time turned to mud." Williams moved to Los Angeles and continued performing stand-up at clubs, including the Comedy Store. There, in 1977, he was seen by television producer George Schlatter, who asked him to appear on a revival of his show Laugh-In. The show aired later that year and marked Williams's television debut. That same year, he performed a show at the L.A. Improv for Home Box Office. Although the Laugh-In revival failed, it opened doors for Williams's television career; he continued performing stand-up at comedy clubs such as the Roxy to help keep his improvisational skills sharp. Williams also took his act overseas and performed at the Fighting Cocks in London.

David Letterman, who knew Williams for nearly 40 years, recalled first seeing him perform as a newcomer at the Comedy Store in Hollywood. Letterman, already an established comedian at the time, described Williams's arrival as "like a hurricane", saying that he thought to himself, "Holy crap, there goes my chance in show business." Williams's first credited film role was a minor part in the 1977 low-budget comedy Can I Do It... 'Til I Need Glasses?. However, his first starring performance was as the title character in Popeye (1980), in which Williams showcased the acting skills previously demonstrated in his television work. The film's commercial disappointment was not blamed on his performance.

==== Mork & Mindy ====
Photo by Michael Dressler, used as cover photo for Time, March 12, 1979

After the Laugh-In revival, and appearing in the cast of The Richard Pryor Show on NBC, Williams was cast by Garry Marshall as the alien Mork in the 1978 Happy Days episode "My Favorite Orkan". Sought after as a last-minute cast replacement for a departing actor, Williams impressed the producer with his quirky humor when he sat on his head when asked to take a seat for the audition. As Mork, Williams improvised much of his dialogue and physical comedy, speaking in a high, nasal voice, and he made the most of the script. The cast and crew, as well as television network executives, were deeply impressed with Williams's performance. The executives moved quickly to sign Williams four days later before competitors could make their own offers.

Mork's appearance proved so popular with viewers that it led to the spin-off television sitcom Mork & Mindy, which co-starred Pam Dawber, and ran from 1978 to 1982; the show was written to accommodate his extreme improvisations in dialogue and behavior. Although he portrayed the same character as in Happy Days, the series was set in the present in Boulder, Colorado, instead of the late 1950s in Milwaukee. Mork & Mindy at its peak had a weekly audience of sixty million and was credited with turning Williams into a "superstar". Among young people, the show was very popular because Williams became "a man and a child, buoyant, rubber-faced, an endless gusher of ideas", according to critic James Poniewozik.

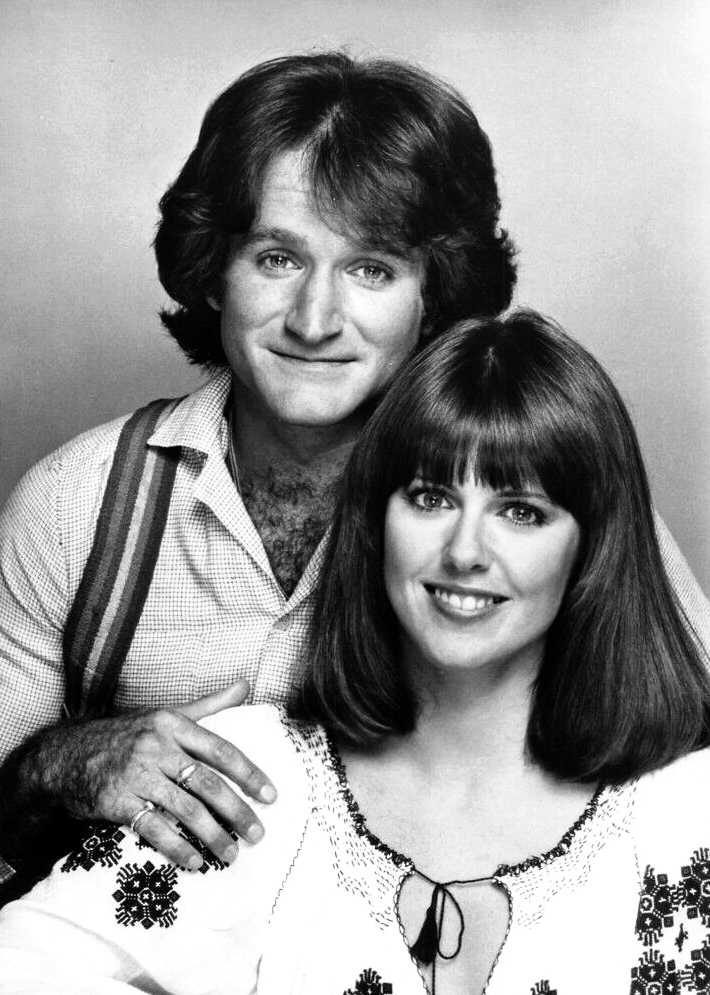
Williams with co-star Pam Dawber in a promotional photo for Mork & Mindy, 1978

Mork became popular, featured on posters, coloring books, lunch-boxes, and other merchandise. Mork & Mindy was such a success in its first season that Williams appeared on the March 12, 1979, cover of Time magazine. The cover photo, taken by Michael Dressler in 1979, is said to have "[captured] his different sides: the funnyman mugging for the camera, and a sweet, more thoughtful pose that appears on a small TV he holds in his hands,” according to Mary Forgione of the Los Angeles Times. This photo was installed in the National Portrait Gallery in the Smithsonian Institution shortly after Williams died to allow visitors to pay their respects. He also appeared on the cover of the August 23, 1979, issue of Rolling Stone, photographed by Richard Avedon.

With his success on Mork & Mindy, Williams began to reach a wider audience with his stand-up comedy, starting in the late 1970s and throughout the 1980s, including three HBO comedy specials: Off The Wall (1978), An Evening with Robin Williams (1983), and A Night at the Met (1986). Williams won a Grammy Award for Best Comedy Album for the recording of his 1979 live show at the Copacabana in New York City, Reality ... What a Concept.

=== 1982–1999: Film stardom and acclaim ===
Williams starred as the lead character in the comedy drama film The World According to Garp (1982), which he noted "may have lacked a certain madness onscreen, but it had a great core". Critic Roger Ebert wrote of his performance, "Although Robin Williams plays Garp as a relatively plausible, sometimes ordinary person, the movie never seems bothered by the jarring contrast between his cheerful pluckiness and the anarchy around him." Williams continued with the comedy drama film, Moscow on the Hudson (1984), where he played a Russian musician who defects to the United States. Ebert noted, "The Russian is played by Robin Williams, who disappears so completely into his quirky, lovable, complicated character that he's quite plausible as a Russian". He had other smaller roles in less successful films, such as The Survivors (1983), The Best of Times (1986) and Club Paradise (1986).

In an interview with critic William Arnold in July 1986, Williams said, "My biggest problem in movies is that I'm a character actor. I don't like the pressure of having to carry the story, to have to advance the plot. It's hard. I guess I just don't want to be the total star. That's what attracted me to Club Paradise. Producers have a hard time understanding that. That's not really what I do. I don't want to be Bogart: I want to be Peter Lorre. Give me a moustache and we'll talk." But Williams later said that those smaller roles in films like Club Paradise ultimately did not help advance his film career.

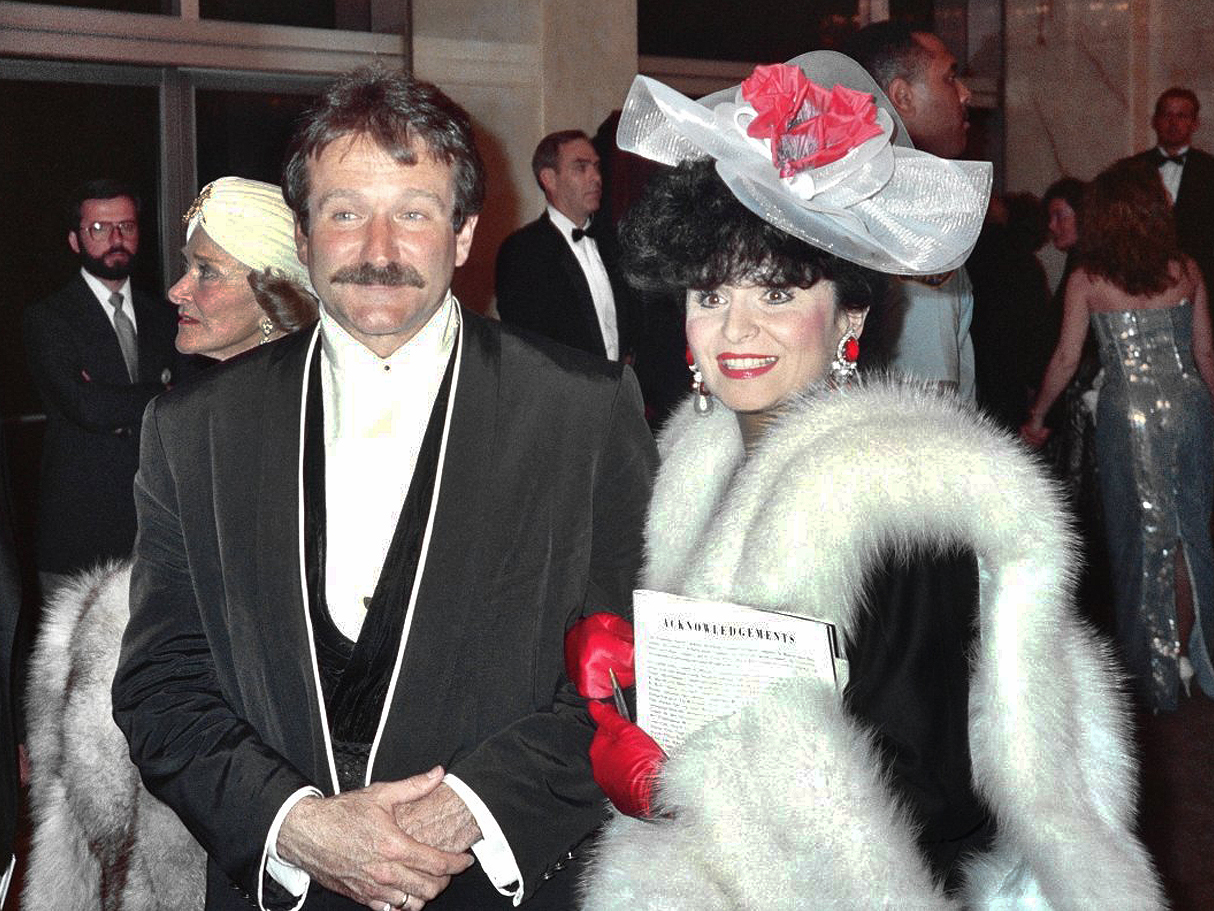
Williams and Yola Czaderska-Hayek at the 62nd Academy Awards in 1990

In 1986, Williams also co-hosted the 58th Academy Awards. The following year, he appeared in a sketch comedy special Carol, Carl, Whoopi and Robin (1987), acting alongside Carol Burnett, Carl Reiner, and Whoopi Goldberg. Williams was also a regular guest on various talk shows, including The Tonight Show Starring Johnny Carson and Late Night with David Letterman, on which he appeared 50 times. Williams finally found his star-making role in director Barry Levinson's Good Morning, Vietnam (1987), which earned Williams a nomination for the Academy Award for Best Actor. The film is set in 1965 during the Vietnam War, with Williams playing the role of Adrian Cronauer, a radio shock jock who keeps troops entertained with comedy and sarcasm. Williams was allowed to play the role without a script, improvising most of his lines. Over the microphone, Williams created voice impressions of various people, including Walter Cronkite, Gomer Pyle, Elvis Presley, Mr. Ed, and Richard Nixon. "We just let the cameras roll," said producer Mark Johnson, and Williams "managed to create something new for every single take".

Williams appeared opposite Steve Martin at Lincoln Center in an off-Broadway production of Waiting for Godot in 1988. In 1989, he played a private-school English teacher in Dead Poets Society, which included a final, emotional scene that some critics said "inspired a generation" and became a part of pop culture. In Awakenings (1990), he plays a doctor modeled after Oliver Sacks, who wrote the book on which the film is based. Sacks later said the way Williams's mind worked was a "form of genius". Similarly, Williams's performance as a therapist in Good Will Hunting (1997) deeply affected even some real therapists. Williams won an Academy Award for Best Supporting Actor for his performance.

In 1991, Williams played an adult Peter Pan in the fantasy film Hook, although he had said that he would have to lose 25 pounds for the role. Similarly in 1995, he played Alan Parrish in the fantasy film Jumanji. Many of his roles during this time were in comedies or dramedies, including his Academy Award for Best Actor nominated performance as a troubled homeless man in The Fisher King (1991), an eccentric toymaker in Toys (1992), a divorced father who impersonates a nanny so he can spend time with his children in Mrs. Doubtfire (1993), a gay man forced to act straight in The Birdcage (1996), a boy who ages four times faster than normal in Jack (1996), an absent-minded professor in Flubber (1997), and a real-life doctor who treats his patients with compassion and humor in Patch Adams (1998); many of these roles were tinged with pathos. Terry Gilliam, who directed Williams in two of his films, The Adventures of Baron Munchausen (1988) and The Fisher King (1991), said in 1992 that Williams had the ability to "go from manic to mad to tender and vulnerable ... [Williams had] the most unique mind on the planet. There's nobody like him out there."

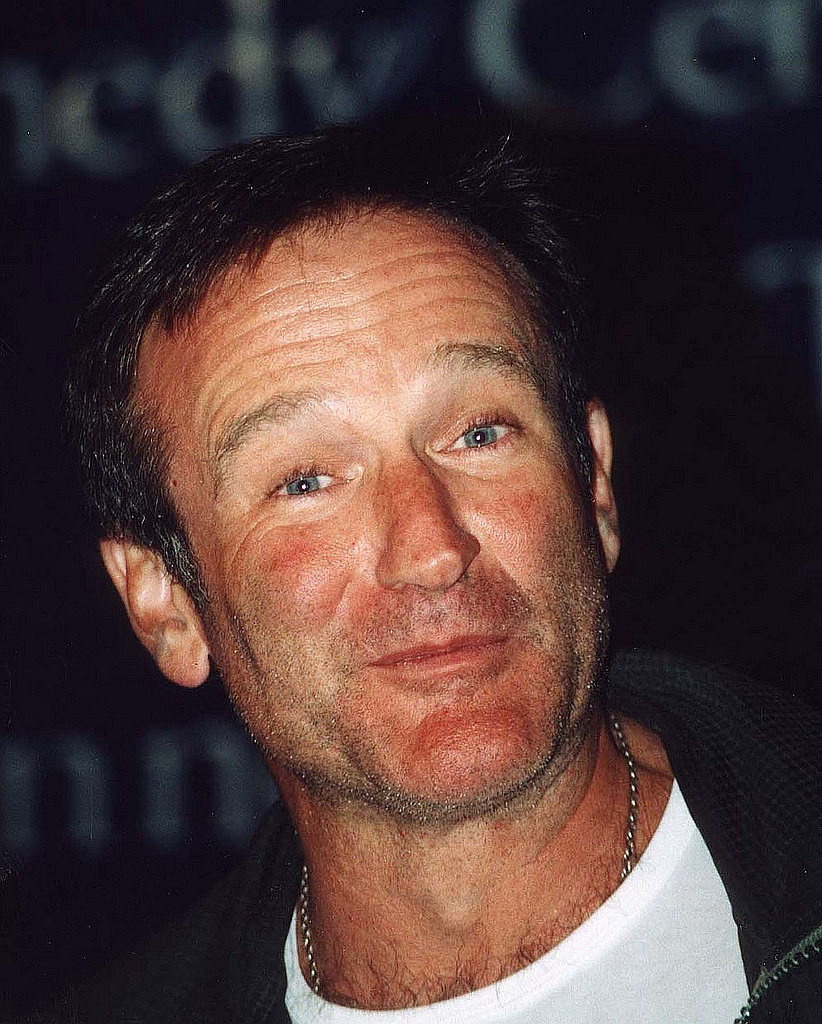
Williams in Washington, D.C., in 1998

Williams also voiced characters in several animated films. He lent his voice to FernGully: The Last Rainforest (1992). In one of his most well-known voice roles, his character as the Genie in the animated musical Aladdin (1992) was written for Williams. The film's directors said that they had taken a risk by writing the role. At first, Williams refused the role because it was a Disney movie and he did not want the studio profiting by selling merchandise based on the movie. Williams accepted the role with certain conditions: "I'm doing it basically because I want to be part of this animation tradition. I want something for my children. One deal is, I just don't want to sell anything—as in Burger King, as in toys, as in stuff." Williams improvised much of his dialogue, recording approximately 30 hours of tape, and impersonated dozens of celebrities, including Ed Sullivan, Jack Nicholson, Robert De Niro, Groucho Marx, Rodney Dangerfield, William F. Buckley Jr., Peter Lorre, Arnold Schwarzenegger, and Arsenio Hall. Williams's role in Aladdin became one of his most recognized and best-loved, and the film was the highest-grossing of 1992; it won numerous awards, including a Special Golden Globe Award for Vocal Work in a Motion Picture for Williams. His performance paved the way for other animated films to incorporate actors with more star power. Williams was named a Disney Legend in 2009.

Due to Disney breaking an agreement with Williams regarding the use of the Genie in the advertising for Aladdin, he refused to sign for the direct-to-video sequel, The Return of Jafar (1994); the Genie was instead voiced by Dan Castellaneta. When Jeffrey Katzenberg was replaced by Joe Roth as Walt Disney Studios chairman, Roth organized a public apology to Williams. He would, in turn, reprise the role in the second sequel, Aladdin and the King of Thieves (1996). Other dramatic performances by Williams include Kenneth Branagh's version of Hamlet (1996), What Dreams May Come (1998), and Bicentennial Man (1999). Williams appeared with fellow comedian, Billy Crystal, in an unscripted cameo at the beginning of a 1997 episode of the third season of Friends.

Looking over most of Williams's filmography, one writer was "struck by the breadth" and radical diversity of most of the roles Williams portrayed. Among the actors who helped Williams during his acting career, he credited Robert De Niro, from whom Williams learned the power of silence and economy of dialogue when acting. From Dustin Hoffman, with whom Williams co-starred in Hook, he learned to take on totally different character types, and to transform his characters by extreme preparation. Mike Medavoy, producer of Hook, told its director, Steven Spielberg, that he intentionally teamed up Hoffman and Williams for the film because he knew they wanted to work together, and that Williams welcomed the opportunity of working with Spielberg. Having Woody Allen, who directed him and Billy Crystal in Deconstructing Harry (1997), helped Williams. Allen knew that Crystal and Williams had often worked together on stage.

=== 2000–2014: Children's films, return to television, and final years ===
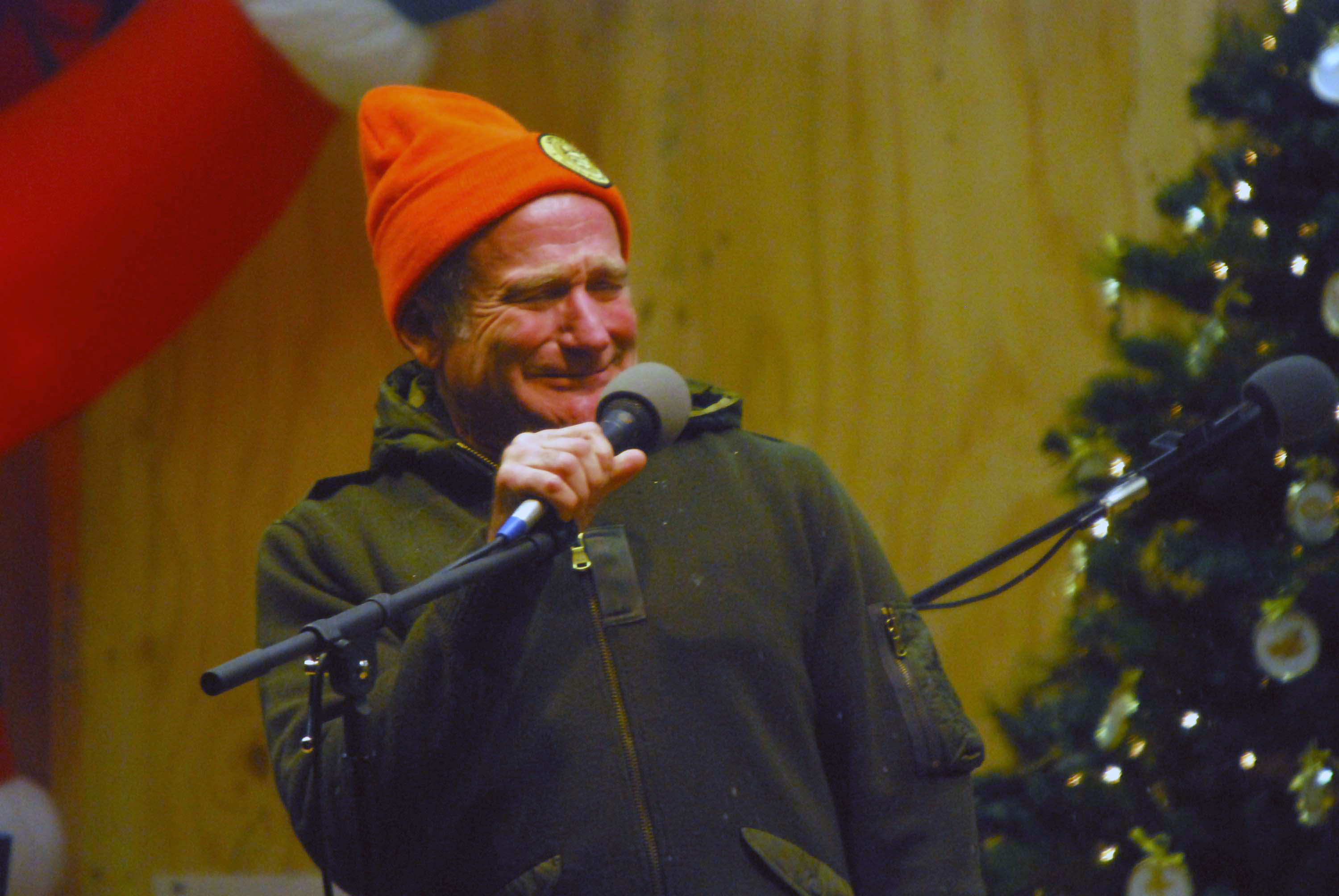
Williams at a United Service Organization (USO) show on December 20, 2007

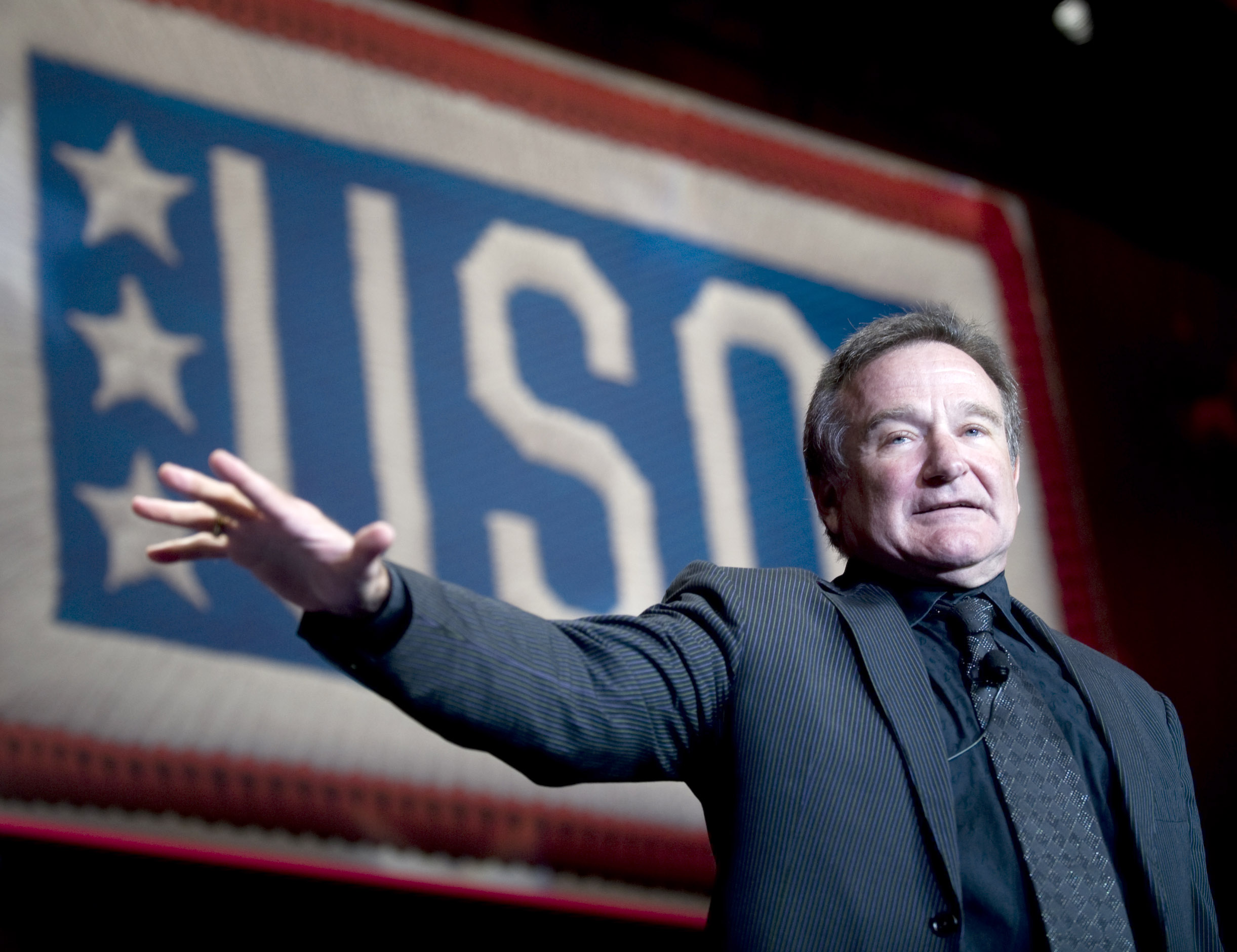
Williams at the USO World Gala in Washington, D.C., on October 1, 2008

Williams was the host of a talk show for Audible that aired in April 2000 and was only available on Audible's website. During the early 2000s, Williams demonstrated a new rank of his versatility by playing darker roles than he had in the previous decades. In Insomnia (2002), Williams portrayed a murderer on the run from a sleep-deprived Los Angeles police detective (played by Al Pacino) in rural Alaska. That same year, in the psychological thriller One Hour Photo, Williams portrayed an emotionally disturbed photo development technician who becomes obsessed with a family for whom he has developed pictures for a long time. In the 2004 science fiction psychological thriller The Final Cut, Williams played a professional who specializes in editing the memories of unsavory people into uncritical memorials that are played at funerals. His many television appearances included an episode of Whose Line Is It Anyway?, and Williams starred in an episode of Law & Order: Special Victims Unit. He headlined his own one-man show, Robin Williams: Live on Broadway, which played at the Broadway Theatre in July 2002.

Williams's stand-up work was a consistent thread throughout his career, as seen by the success of his one-man show (and subsequent DVD), Robin Williams: Live on Broadway (2002). In 2004, Williams was voted 13th on Comedy Central's list of "100 Greatest Stand-ups of All Time". Two years later, he was the Surprise Guest at the Nickelodeon Kids' Choice Awards, and appeared on an episode of Extreme Makeover: Home Edition that aired January 30. After a six-year hiatus, in August 2008, Williams announced a new 26-city tour, Weapons of Self-Destruction. The tour began at the end of September 2009, and concluded in New York on December 3, and was the subject of an HBO Special on December 8, 2009.

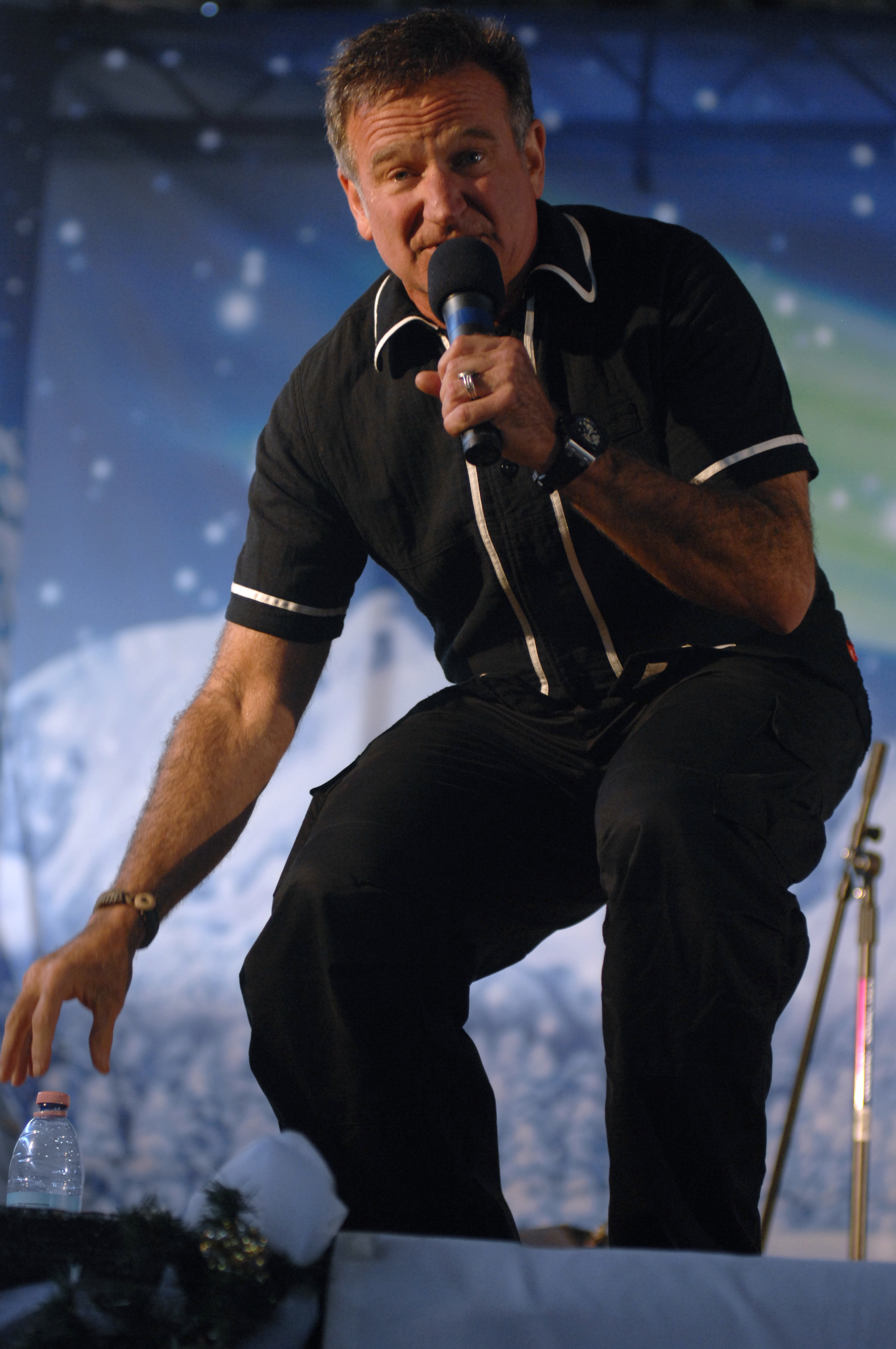
Williams at Aviano Air Base (Italy) on December 22, 2007

Years after the films, Janet Hirshenson revealed in an interview that Williams had expressed interest in portraying Rubeus Hagrid in the Harry Potter film series, but was rejected by director Chris Columbus due to the "British-only edict". In 2006, Williams starred in five movies, including RV, a family road trip comedy, Man of the Year, a political satire, and The Night Listener, a thriller about a radio show host who realizes that a child with whom he has developed a friendship may not exist. He played Theodore Roosevelt in the Night at the Museum films (2006–2014). In 2009, he starred in the comedy drama film World's Greatest Dad, and the comedy movie Old Dogs. Williams continued to provide voices in other animated films, including the holographic character Dr. Know in the live-action film A.I. Artificial Intelligence (2001), as well as voice roles in Robots (2005), the Happy Feet film franchise (2006–2011), and an uncredited vocal performance in Everyone's Hero (2006). Williams was the voice of The Timekeeper, a former attraction at the Walt Disney World Resort about a time-traveling robot who encounters Jules Verne and brings him to the future.

In 2010, Williams appeared in a sketch with Robert De Niro on Saturday Night Live, and in 2012, he guest-starred as himself in two FX series, Louie and Wilfred. Williams made his Broadway acting debut in Rajiv Joseph's Bengal Tiger at the Baghdad Zoo, which opened at the Richard Rodgers Theatre on March 31, 2011. For his performance, Williams was nominated for the Drama League Award for Outstanding Distinguished Performer. In 2013, he appeared in Lee Daniels' historical drama The Butler as President Dwight D. Eisenhower. In September 2013, CBS started a new series, The Crazy Ones, starring Williams, which was canceled after one season. The Angriest Man in Brooklyn was his last movie to be released during his lifetime. In the movie, Williams played Henry Altmann, an angry, bitter man who tries to change his life after being told he has a terminal illness. Four films starring Williams were released after his death in 2014: Night at the Museum: Secret of the Tomb, A Merry Friggin' Christmas, Boulevard, and Absolutely Anything.

== Personal life ==
=== Marriages and children ===
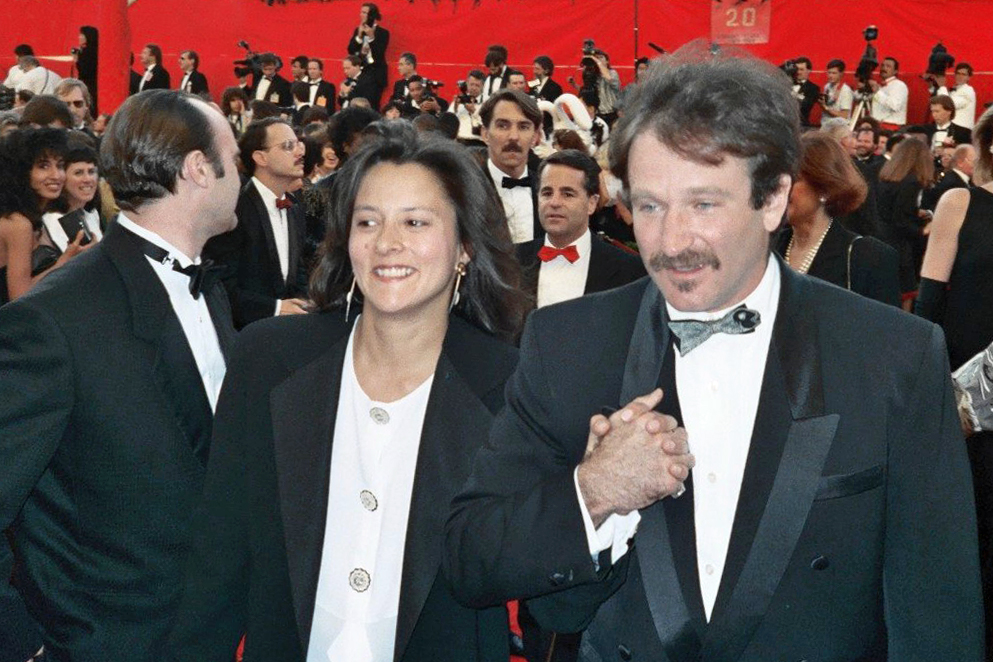
Williams with Marsha Garces at the 61st Academy Awards in 1989

Following a live-in relationship with comedian, writer, and actress Elayne Boosler, Williams married actress Valerie Velardi in 1978, who he met two years earlier while he was working as a bartender at a San Francisco tavern. Their son, Zachary Pym, was born in 1983. Velardi and Williams divorced in 1988.

While it was reported in 1986 that Williams began an affair with Zachary's nanny, Marsha Garces, Velardi stated in the 2018 documentary, Robin Williams: Come Inside My Mind, that the relationship with Garces began after the two had separated. Williams married Garces on April 30, 1989, when she was six months pregnant with their first child, Zelda Rae (born 1989). They had their second child, Cody Alan, in 1991. In March 2008, Garces filed for divorce from Williams, citing irreconcilable differences. Their divorce was finalized in 2010.

In 2011, Williams married graphic designer Susan Schneider, and they remained married until his death. They lived at their house in Sea Cliff, San Francisco, California. Williams said, "My children give me a great sense of wonder. Just to see them develop into these extraordinary human beings."

=== Interests ===
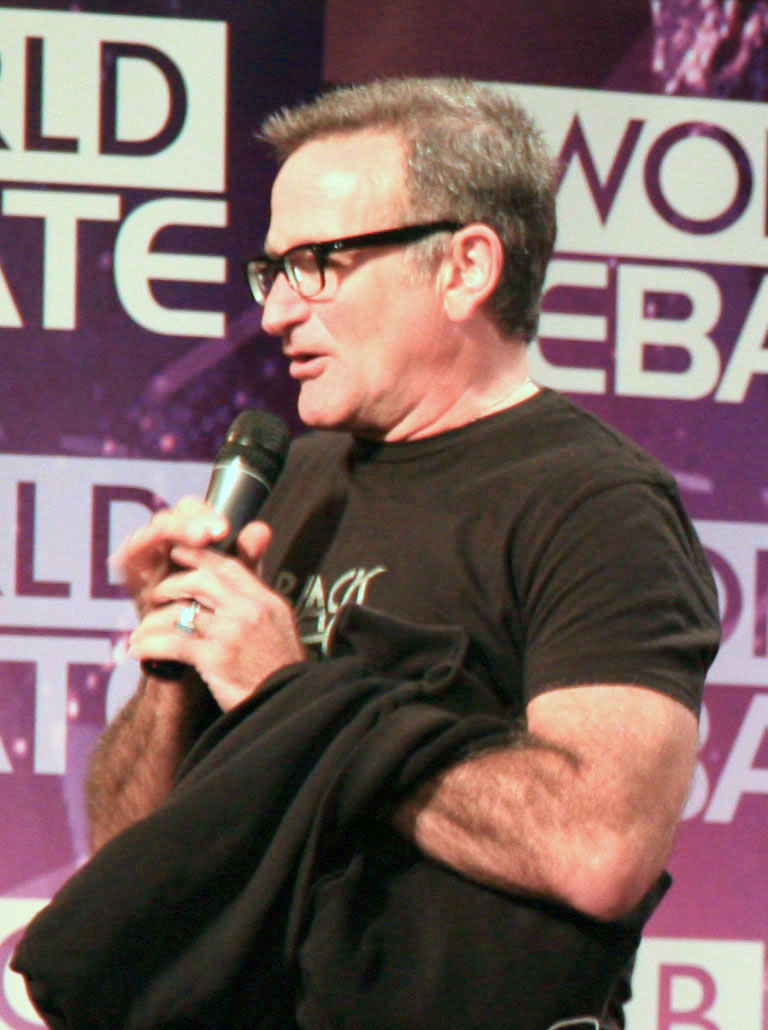
Williams at the BBC World Debate on February 27, 2008

In New York City, Williams was part of the West Side YMCA runners club and showed promising results with 34:21 minutes at a 10K run in Central Park in 1975. His favorite novels were The Foundation Trilogy: Foundation (1951), Foundation and Empire (1952), and Second Foundation (1953) by Isaac Asimov, and his favorite book as a child was The Lion, the Witch and the Wardrobe (1950), which he later shared with his children.

Williams was a proficient French speaker. He was able to convey his sense of humour and comedy routines in French almost as well as he could in English.

Williams enjoyed pen-and-paper role-playing games and video games. His daughter Zelda was named after Princess Zelda from The Legend of Zelda, a family favorite video game series, and Williams sometimes performed at consumer entertainment trade shows.

Williams was a fan of anime and collectible figures. His daughter described him as a "figurine hoarder"; one of his figures was the character Deunan Knute from the 2004 anime film Appleseed, of which Williams was a fan. He also liked the 2004 anime film Ghost in the Shell 2: Innocence.

Williams became a devoted cycling enthusiast, having taken it up partly as a substitute for drugs. He accumulated a large bicycle collection and became a fan of professional road cycling, often traveling to racing events such as the Tour de France. In 2016, Williams's children donated 87 of his bicycles in support of the Challenged Athletes Foundation and Christopher & Dana Reeve Foundation.

=== Religious beliefs ===
Williams was raised and sometimes identified himself as an Episcopalian. In a comedy routine, Williams described his denomination as: "I have that idea of Chicago Protestant, Episcopal—Catholic light: half the religion, half the guilt." He also described himself as an "honorary Jew".

=== Philanthropy ===
In 1986, Williams teamed up with Whoopi Goldberg and Billy Crystal to establish Comic Relief USA. This annual HBO television benefit devoted to the homeless raised $80 million as of 2014. Bob Zmuda, creator of Comic Relief, explains that Williams felt blessed because he came from a wealthy home, but wanted to do something to help those less fortunate. Williams made benefit appearances to support literacy and women's rights, along with appearing at benefits for veterans. He was a regular on the USO circuit, where Williams traveled to 13 countries and performed to approximately 90,000 troops. After his death, the USO thanked Williams "for all he did for the men and women of our armed forces".

Williams and his second wife Marsha founded a philanthropic organization called the Windfall Foundation to raise money for many charities. In December 1999, he sang in French on the BBC-inspired music video of international celebrities doing a cover version of the Rolling Stones' 1974 single "It's Only Rock 'n Roll (But I Like It)" for the charity Children's Promise.

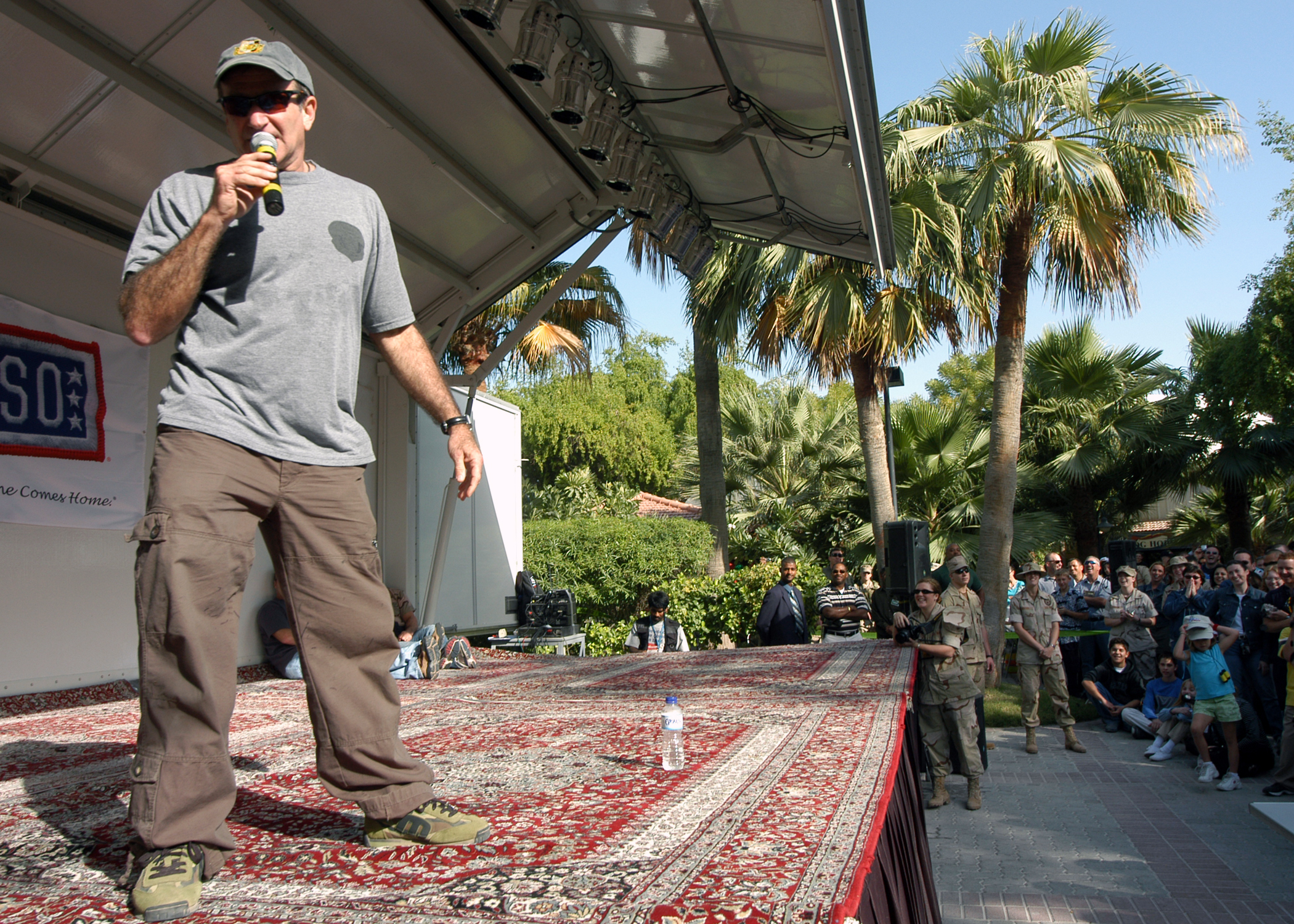
Williams at Naval Support Activity Bahrain on December 19, 2003

In response to the 2010 Canterbury earthquake, Williams donated all proceeds of his Weapons of Self Destruction Christchurch performance to help rebuild the New Zealand city. Half the proceeds were donated to the Red Cross and half to the mayoral building fund. Williams performed with the USO for U.S. troops stationed in Iraq and Afghanistan. For several years, Williams supported St. Jude Children's Research Hospital.

=== Substance abuse ===
During the late 1970s and early 1980s, Williams was addicted to cocaine. He was a casual friend of the Saturday Night Live comedian John Belushi, and partied with him the night before Belushi died of a drug overdose in 1982. The shock of Belushi's death, along with the birth of his son Zak, prompted Williams to get sober: "Was it a wake-up call? Oh yeah, on a huge level. The grand jury helped, too." Williams turned to exercise and cycling to help alleviate his depression after Belushi's death; according to the bicycle shop owner Tony Tom, Williams said "cycling saved my life".

In 2003, Williams began abusing alcohol again during production of the film The Big White (2005) in Alaska. In 2006, he checked into a substance-abuse rehabilitation center in Newberg, Oregon. Years later, Williams acknowledged his failure to maintain sobriety, but said that he never returned to using cocaine, saying in a 2010 interview: "Cocaine—paranoid and impotent, what fun. There was no bit of me thinking, ooh, let's go back to that. Useless conversations until midnight, waking up at dawn feeling like a vampire on a day pass." In mid-2014, Williams was admitted to the Hazelden Foundation Addiction Treatment Center in Center City, Minnesota, again for alcoholism.

=== Health problems ===
In March 2009, Williams was hospitalized due to heart problems. He postponed his one-man tour for surgery to replace his aortic valve, repair his mitral valve and correct his irregular heartbeat. The surgery was completed March 13, 2009, at the Cleveland Clinic.

Williams's publicist, Mara Buxbaum, commented that he had severe depression before his death. His wife, Susan Schneider, said that in the period before his death, Williams had been sober but was diagnosed with early-stage Parkinson's disease, which he had not made public. An autopsy revealed that Williams had diffuse Lewy bodies, which had been misdiagnosed as Parkinson's, and this may have contributed to his depression.

In an essay published in the journal Neurology two years after his death, Schneider revealed that the pathology of Lewy body disease in Williams was described by several doctors as among the worst pathologies they had seen. She described the early symptoms of his disease as beginning in October 2013. Williams's initial condition included a sudden and prolonged spike in fear, anxiety, stress, and insomnia, which worsened in severity and included memory loss, paranoia, and delusions. According to Schneider, "Robin was losing his mind and he was aware of it ... He kept saying, 'I just want to reboot my brain.'"

== Death ==
Williams died at his Paradise Cay, California, home on August 11, 2014. His cause of death was declared as suicide by hanging amid Lewy body dementia (LBD) and other associated factors. Describing the disease as "the terrorist inside my husband's brain", Schneider said that "however you look at it—the presence of Lewy bodies took his life", referring to his previous diagnosis of Parkinson's. She noted "how we as a culture don't have the vocabulary to discuss brain disease in the way we do about depression. Depression is a symptom of LBD and it's not about psychology – it's rooted in neurology. His brain was falling apart." Medical experts had earlier struggled to determine a cause, and had eventually diagnosed him with Parkinson's disease.

The Lewy Body Dementia Association (LBDA) clarified the distinction between the term used in Williams's autopsy report, "diffuse Lewy body dementia", which is more commonly called "diffuse Lewy body disease", and refers to the underlying disease process—and the umbrella term, "Lewy body dementia"—which encompasses both Parkinson's disease dementia (PDD) and dementia with Lewy bodies (DLB). According to LBDA spokesperson Dennis Dickson, "The report confirms he experienced depression, anxiety, and paranoia, which may occur in either Parkinson's disease or dementia with Lewy bodies. ... In early PD, Lewy bodies are generally limited in distribution, but in DLB, the Lewy bodies are spread widely throughout the brain, as was the case with Robin Williams." Ian G. McKeith, professor and researcher of Lewy body dementias, said that Williams's symptoms and autopsy findings were explained by DLB. Williams's body was cremated at Monte's Chapel of the Hills in San Anselmo, and his ashes were scattered over San Francisco Bay on August 21, 2014.

=== Aftermath and tributes ===
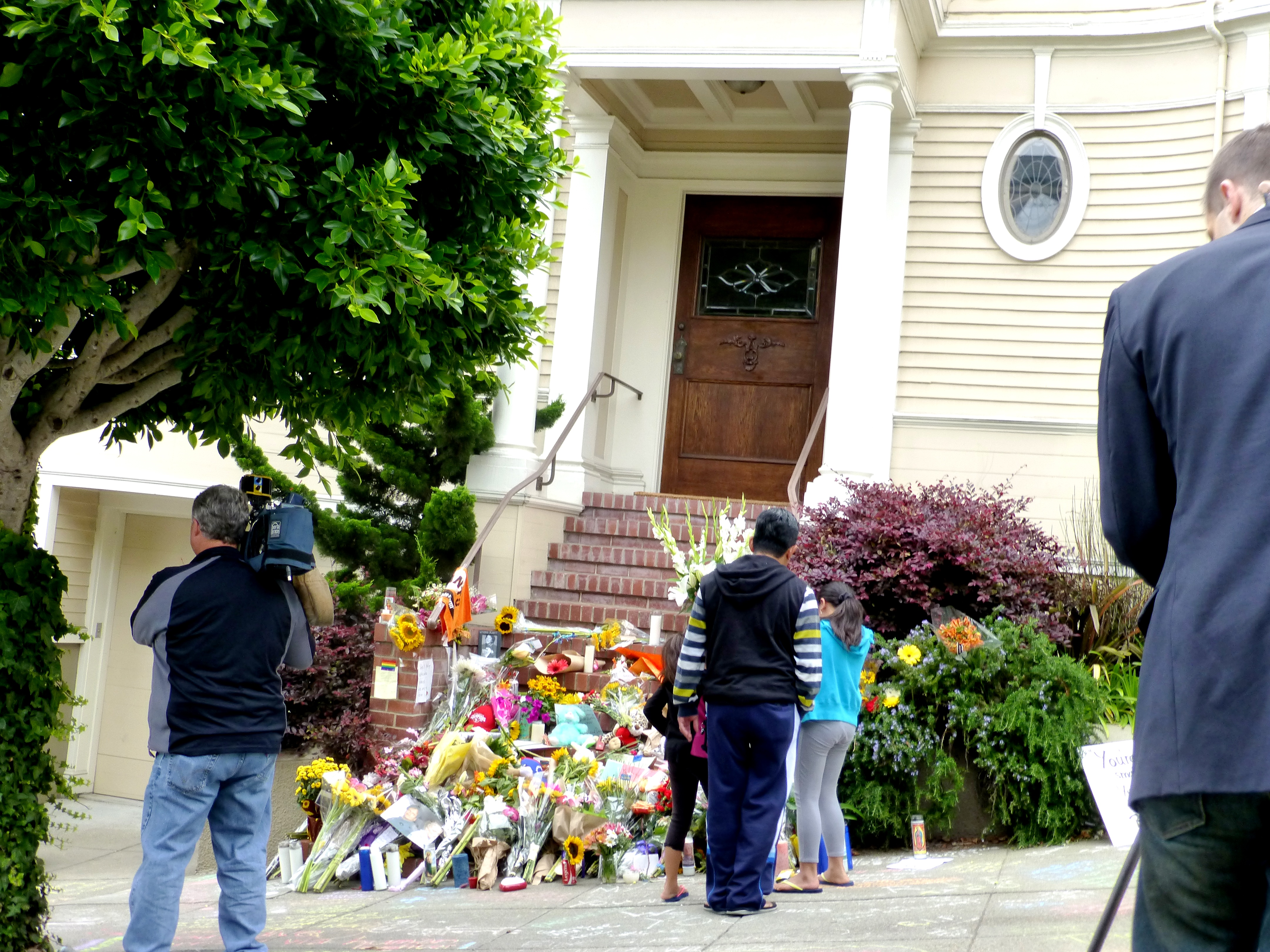
Floral tributes to Williams at the San Francisco Pacific Heights home used for the filming of Mrs. Doubtfire, August 2014

At the time of his death, Williams planned to appear as the "Blackmail" special guest for the final night of Monty Python's ten-date stage shows in London with his friend Eric Idle but canceled due to severe depression. The show's home video release was dedicated to Williams.

During the opening of the International Youth Day at the United Nations headquarters, Assistant Secretary General Thomas Gass stood on the pulpit of the United Nations Economic and Social Council Chamber and quoted one of Keating's lines from Dead Poets Society: "Dare to look at things in a different way!". Several fans paid tribute to Williams on social media with photo and video reenactments of Dead Poets Society's "O Captain! My Captain!" scene.

Shortly after Williams's death, Disney Channel, Disney XD, and Disney Junior aired Aladdin commercial-free over the course of a week, with a dedicated drawing of the Genie at the end of each airing before the credits. In honor of his theater work, the lights of Broadway were darkened for the evening of August 14. That night, the cast of the Aladdin musical joined the audience in a sing-along of "Friend Like Me", an Oscar-nominated song originally performed by Williams.

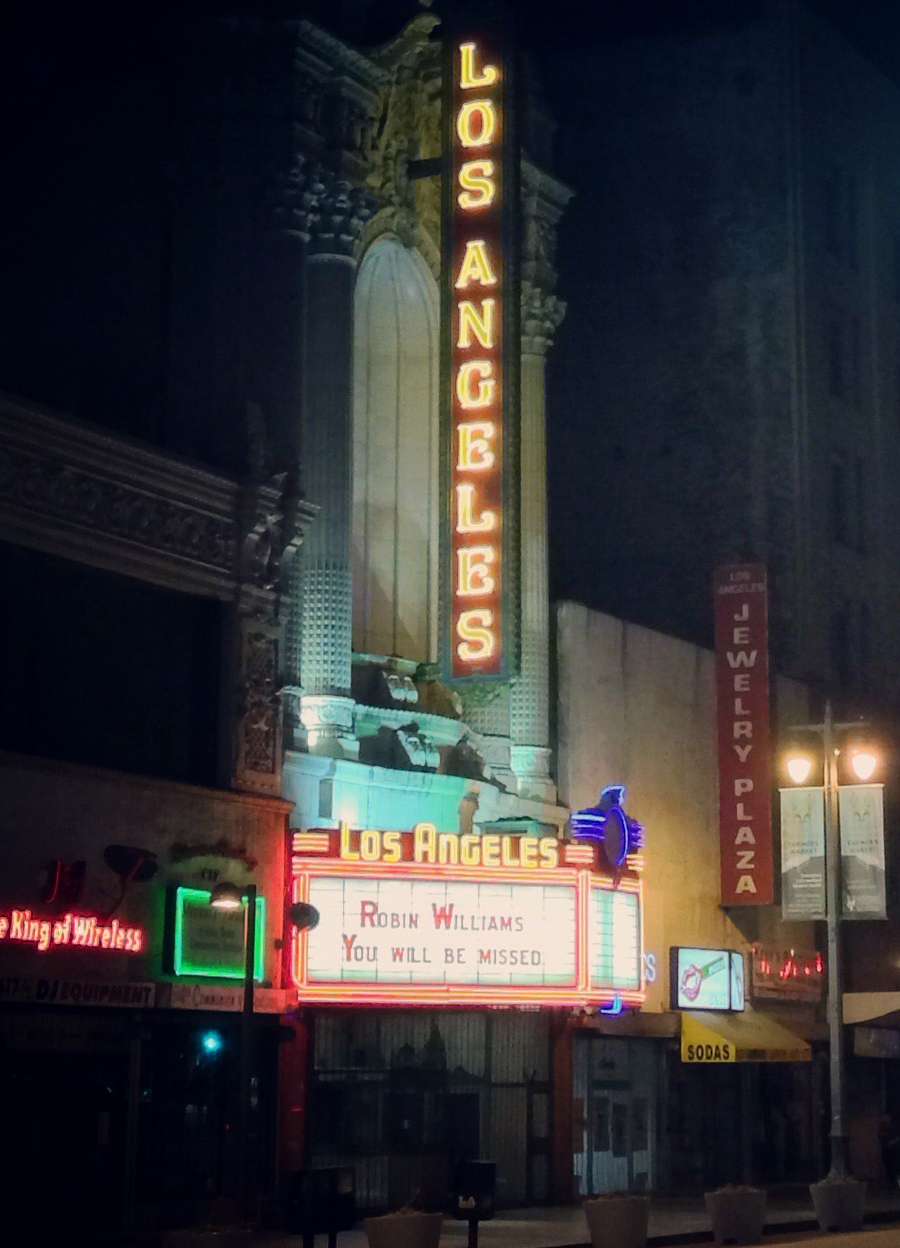
The Los Angeles Theatre honors Williams on its marquee, August 2014.

Fans of Williams created makeshift memorials at his star on the Hollywood Walk of Fame and at locations from his television and film career, such as the bench in Boston's Public Garden featured in Good Will Hunting; the Pacific Heights, San Francisco, home used in Mrs. Doubtfire; the sign for Parrish Shoes in Keene, New Hampshire, where parts of Jumanji were filmed; and the Boulder, Colorado, home used for Mork & Mindy.

During the 66th Primetime Emmy Awards on August 25, Billy Crystal presented a tribute to Williams, referring to him as "the brightest star in our comedy galaxy". Afterward, some of Williams's best comedy moments were shown, including his first The Tonight Show appearance, indicating his great life in making people laugh. Talk show hosts, including David Letterman, Conan O'Brien, Seth Meyers, Jimmy Kimmel, and Jimmy Fallon, paid tribute to Williams on their respective shows.

On September 9, 2014, PBS aired a one-hour special devoted to Williams's career. Later that month, family members and celebrities paid tribute to his life and career in San Francisco. British heavy metal band Iron Maiden dedicated a song to Williams, titled "Tears of a Clown", on their 2015 album The Book of Souls. The song looks into his depression and suicide, and how he attempted to hide his condition from the public.

A tunnel painted with a rainbow on Highway 101, north of the Golden Gate Bridge, was officially named the "Robin Williams Tunnel" on February 29, 2016. In 2017, Sharon Meadow in San Francisco's Golden Gate Park, the home of the annual Comedy Day, was renamed "Robin Williams Meadow".

In 2018, HBO produced a documentary about his life and career. Directed by Marina Zenovich, the film Robin Williams: Come Inside My Mind was also screened at the Sundance Film Festival. That same year, a mural of Robin Williams was created on Market Street in San Francisco. Work on a biography was begun by The New York Times writer David Itzkoff in 2014, and was published four years later, titled Robin.

In September 2020, Vertical Entertainment released a documentary titled Robin's Wish about Williams's battle with Lewy body dementia. In May 2022, Williams was inducted into a hall of fame at the National Comedy Center in Jamestown, New York. In 2025, Williams became the subject of a controversy over AI generated videos in which Zelda pleaded for people to stop sending her AI videos of her father, stating that's "not what he would have wanted."

== Recognition and legacy ==
You can't look at any modern comic and say, "That's the descendant of Robin Williams", because it's not possible to be a Robin Williams rip-off. ... He raised the bar for what it's possible to do, and made an enormous amount of us want to be comedians.

— Judd Apatow

Although Williams was first recognized as a stand-up comedian and television star, he became known for acting in film roles of substance and serious drama. He was considered a "national treasure" by many in the entertainment industry and by the public.

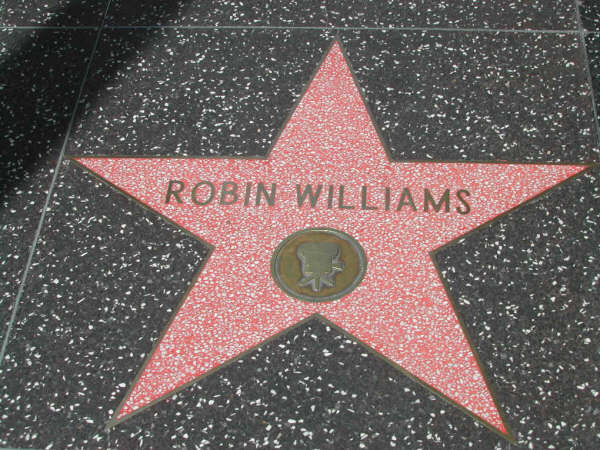
Star on the Hollywood Walk of Fame

Williams's onstage energy and improvisational skill became a model for a new generation of stand-up comedians. Many comedians valued the way he worked highly personal issues into his comedy routines, especially his honesty about drug and alcohol addiction, along with depression. According to media scholar Derek A. Burrill, because of the openness with which Williams spoke about his own life, "probably the most important contribution he made to pop culture, across so many different media, was as Robin Williams the person".

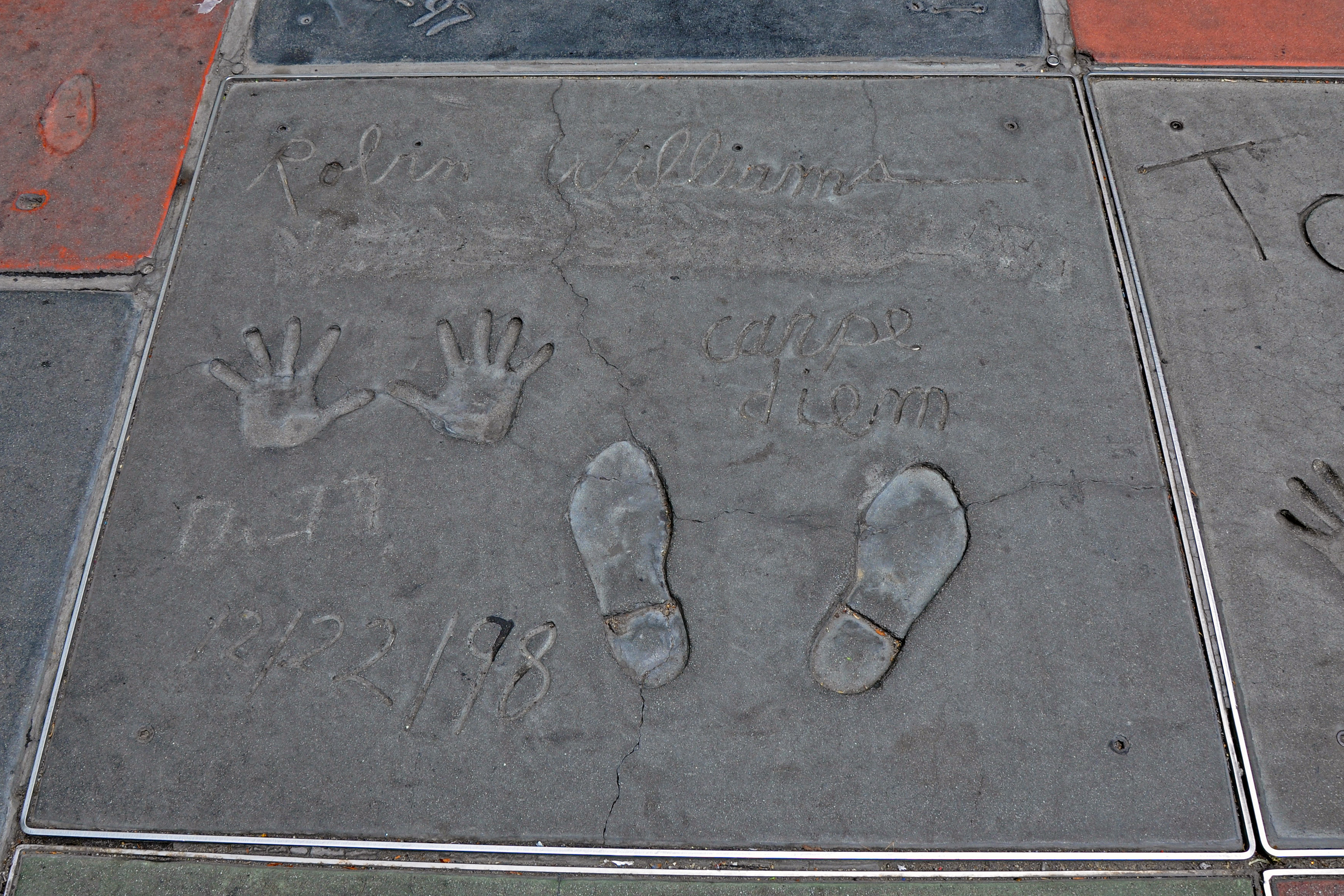
Williams's prints at Grauman's Chinese Theatre

Williams created a signature free-form comedy persona so widely and uniquely identified that new comedians like Jim Carrey impersonated him, paving the way for the growing comedy scene that developed in San Francisco. Young comedians felt more liberated on stage by seeing his spontaneously diverse range: "One moment acting as a bright, mischievous child, then as a wise philosopher or alien from outer space". According to Judd Apatow, the eclectic performer's rapid-fire improvisational style was an inspiration as well as an influence for other comedians, but his talent was so extremely unusual no one else could possibly attempt to copy it.

Williams's film performances often influenced other actors, both in and out of the film industry. Director Chris Columbus, who directed him in Mrs. Doubtfire, says watching him work "was a magical and special privilege. His performances were unlike anything any of us had ever seen, they came from some spiritual and otherworldly place." Looking over most of Williams's filmography, Alyssa Rosenberg at The Washington Post was "struck by the breadth" and radical diversity of most of his roles, writing that "Williams helped us grow up".

=== Comedic style ===
Williams said that, partly due to the stress of performing stand-up, he started using drugs and alcohol early in his career. He further said that he neither drank nor took drugs while on stage, but occasionally performed when hung over from the previous day. During the period when he was using cocaine, Williams said it made him paranoid when performing on stage.

Williams once described the life of stand-up comedians as follows:

It's a brutal field, man. They burn out. It takes its toll. Plus, the lifestyle—partying, drinking, drugs. If you're on the road, it's even more brutal. You gotta come back down to mellow your ass out, and then performing takes you back up. They flame out because it comes and goes. Suddenly they're hot, and then somebody else is hot. Sometimes they get very bitter. Sometimes they just give up. Sometimes they have a revival thing and they come back again. Sometimes they snap. The pressure kicks in. You become obsessed and then you lose that focus that you need.

Some, such as the critic Vincent Canby, were concerned that Williams's monologues were so intense that it seemed as though, at any minute, his "creative process could reverse into a complete meltdown". His biographer, Emily Herbert, described Williams's "intense, utterly manic style of stand-up [which sometimes] defies analysis ... [going] beyond energetic, beyond frenetic ... [and sometimes] dangerous ... because of what it said about the creator's own mental state." Regarding the quick-fire delivery of his performance, Williams said, "Usually, you start off performing in bars, where you can't really take your time, because people go: [mimics a drunk person] 'Oy, what are you doing now?' So I developed a style that was very much synaptic: quick-firing, moving, so that they never really had a chance to lock on as a target."

Williams felt secure that he would not run out of ideas, as the constant change in world events would keep him supplied. He also explained that he often used free association of ideas while improvising to keep the audience interested. The competitive nature of the show made things difficult. For example, some comedians said that Williams had stolen their jokes, which he strongly denied. David Brenner claimed that he confronted Williams's agent and threatened bodily harm if he heard him utter another one of his jokes. Whoopi Goldberg defended Williams, asserting that it is difficult for comedians not to reuse another comedian's material, and that it is done "all the time". Subsequently, he avoided going to performances of other comedians to deter similar accusations.

During a Playboy interview in 1992, Williams was asked whether he ever feared losing his balance between his work and his life. He replied, "There's that fear—if I felt like I was becoming not just dull but a rock, that I still couldn't speak, fire off or talk about things, if I'd start to worry or got too afraid to say something. ... If I stop trying, I get afraid." While he attributed the recent suicide of novelist Jerzy Kosiński to his fear of losing his creativity and sharpness, Williams felt that he could overcome those risks. For that, he credited his father for strengthening his self-confidence, telling him to never be afraid of talking about subjects which were important to him.

=== Influences ===
Williams credited comedians, including Jonathan Winters, Peter Sellers, Nichols and May, and Lenny Bruce as influences, admiring their ability to attract a more intellectual audience with a higher level of wit. He also liked Jay Leno for his quickness in ad-libbing comedy routines, and Sid Caesar, whose acts he felt were "precious".

Jonathan Winters was his "idol" early in life; Williams, aged eight, first saw him on television and paid him homage in interviews throughout his career. Williams was inspired by Winters's ingenuity, saying "that anything is possible, that anything is funny ... He gave me the idea that it can be free-form, that you can go in and out of things pretty easily."

During an interview in London in 2002, Williams told Michael Parkinson that Peter Sellers was an important influence, especially his multi-character roles in Dr. Strangelove, stating, "It doesn't get better than that." British comedy actors Dudley Moore and Peter Cook were also among his influences, Williams told Parkinson.

Williams was also influenced by Richard Pryor's fearless ability to talk about his personal life onstage, with subjects that included his use of drugs and alcohol, and Williams added those kinds of topics during his own performances. By bringing up such personal matters as a form of comedy, Williams told Parkinson that it was "cheaper than therapy", and gave him a way to release his pent-up energy and emotions.

== Acting credits and accolades ==
Throughout his career, Williams won numerous awards, including an Academy Award for Best Supporting Actor for his role in Good Will Hunting (1997). He also won six Golden Globe Awards, including Best Actor (Musical or Comedy) for his roles in Good Morning, Vietnam (1987), The Fisher King (1991), and Mrs. Doubtfire (1993), along with the Special Award for Vocal Work for voicing Genie in Aladdin (1992), and the Cecil B. DeMille Award in 2005. Williams also received two Primetime Emmy Awards, two Screen Actors Guild Awards, and five Grammy Awards.

== Discography ==
- Reality ... What a Concept (Casablanca, 1979)
- Throbbing Python of Love (Casablanca, 1983)
- A Night at the Met (Columbia, 1986)
- Live 2002 (Columbia, 2002)
- Weapons of Self Destruction (Sony Music, 2009)
