= Can I Do It... 'Til I Need Glasses? =

Can I Do It...til I Need Glasses?
- Theatrical release poster
- Directed by: I. Robert Levy
- Written by: Mike Callie; Mike Price; I. Robert Levy
- Produced by: Mike Callie
- Starring: Jeff Doucette
- Cinematography: Craig Greene
- Music by: Bob Jung
- Production company: Dauntless Productions
- Distributed by: National American Films
- Release date: August 10, 1977
- Running time: 73 minutes
- Language: English
- Budget: $750,000
- Box office: $3.5 million

Can I Do It...til I Need Glasses? is a 1977 American anthology comedy film directed by I. Robert Levy and featuring an ensemble of comedians and character actors. It was Robin Williams's film debut, and a sequel to the very successful If You Don't Stop It... You'll Go Blind!!! (1975).

== Plot ==
Like its predecessor, Can I Do It... 'Til I Need Glasses? is a plotless collection of bawdy jokes, burlesque blackouts, and adult comedy sketches aimed at the collegiate audience.

== Cast ==
- Roger Behr
- Jeff Doucette
- Walter Olkewicz
- Pat Wright
- Joey Camen
- Vic Dunlop
- Debra Klose
- Moose Carlson
- Roger Peltz

=== Appearing in sketches ===
- Ina Gould as Old Lady
- Angelyne as Little Red Riding Hood
- I. Robert Levy as Man on Bus
- Thelma Pelish as Angry Lady
- Ron Jeremy as Promoter
- Robin Williams as Lawyer / Man with Toothache
- Rod Haase as Omar

== Reception ==
Variety called it "a juvenile, unfunny screen version of some of the oldest and worst sex jokes in comedy history". Linda Gross of the Los Angeles Times wrote that the film was "lamely directed", and had something that "will insult almost everyone". The Dayton Daily News review was more charitable: "A lot of familiar jokes, most of them dirty, are strung together in this well-made anthology."

== Re-release and court case ==
Robin Williams, an unknown comedian at the time, was paid $150 to appear in two short segments (as an attorney, and as a hillbilly with a toothache) that did not make it into the original cut of the film. The movie returned a profit on its small budget -- although not as much as the former If You Don't Stop It... film. After Williams became a star on the TV series, Mork & Mindy, producer Mike Callie spent two weeks in December 1978 sorting through the deleted footage until he located the "lost" Robin Williams scenes, recut the film, and rereleased it with Williams given top billing.

Williams and his management took legal action against Callie and the film's distributor for "false and misleading advertising", and, during a court hearing, Callie agreed to modify the newspaper and TV ads so that they would no longer imply that Williams was the star of the film. The revised screen credits, at the very end of the film, have a "curtain call" of the film's individual cast members. A still photo of Williams is inserted at the very end, with the caption: "And of course...Robin Williams."
