= A Night at the Met =

Studio album by Robin Williams
- Released: August 9, 1986
- Genre: Stand-up comedy
- Length: 53:13 (audio album); 65 min (TV movie)
- Labels: Columbia, Legacy
- Producers: David Steinberg, Brooks Arthur

Robin Williams chronology
Throbbing Python of Love (1983)	A Night at the Met (1986)	Pecos Bill (1988)

Professional ratings
Review scores
Source	Rating
AllMusic	4.5/5 stars

A Night at the Met is the third official album by Robin Williams, released August 9, 1986. It features segments recorded live at the Metropolitan Opera House in New York City. The album won the 1988 Grammy Award for Best Comedy Performance Single or Album, Spoken or Musical.

The album was released the year before Williams's critically acclaimed performance in the motion picture, Good Morning, Vietnam. He had been shifting his focus from stand-up comedy to filmmaking for several years, and A Night at the Met would be one of his last major concerts during the 1980s. The show is a mix of Williams's quick-witted humor and voice work, with rants on the topics of drugs, sex, world affairs and parenting. References to the events and people of the 1980s are heavily mentioned throughout: U.S. President, Ronald Reagan, Libyan leader, Muammar Gaddafi, and General Secretary of the Communist Party of the Soviet Union, Mikhail Gorbachev, are central to many of the jokes.

== Track listing ==
No.	Title	Length
1.	"Opening"	1:58
2.	"Ballet"	1:31
3.	"Alcohol"	5:27
4.	"Marijuana"	2:21
5.	"Cocaine"	4:11
6.	"Cops"	2:53
7.	"Reagan"	5:45
8.	"Khadafi"	1:51
9.	"Spring"	1:32
10.	"Men's Parts"	1:37
11.	"Lust"	3:48
12.	"Dr. Roof"	4:33
13.	"Pregnancy"	2:08
14.	"Childbirth"	4:14
15.	"Childhood"	6:03
16.	"...And the Future"	3:16
Total length:		53:13
