= Carol, Carl, Whoopi and Robin =

1987 comedy special

- Written by: Dick Clair; Jim Evering; Jenna McMahon; Ken Welch; Mitzie Welch
- Directed by: Roger Beatty; Harvey Korman
- Starring: Carol Burnett; Carl Reiner; Whoopi Goldberg; Robin Williams
- Music by: Peter Matz
- Country of origin: United States
- Original language: English

Production
- Producers: Dick Clair; Jenna McMahon; Stephanie Sills
- Editor: Tucker Wiard
- Running time: 60 minutes

Original release
- Network: ABC
- Release: February 10, 1987

Carol, Carl, Whoopi and Robin (also billed as A Carol Burnett Special...Carol, Carl, Whoopi, and Robin) is a comedy variety television special which aired on February 10, 1987, on ABC. It starred Carol Burnett, Carl Reiner, Whoopi Goldberg and Robin Williams. Burnett served as the host of the one hour long spinoff special from her variety series The Carol Burnett Show featuring the guest stars, Reiner, Goldberg, and Williams. The special received positive reviews praising the performances of the comedians, and received a Primetime Emmy Award for Outstanding Individual Performance In A Variety Or Music Program for Robin Williams' performance in the special.

== Summary ==
The hour-long special hosted by Carol Burnett features musical and comedy routines with Carol and guest performers, Carl Reiner, Whoopi Goldberg, and Robin Williams. The four comedians, Burnett, Reiner, Goldberg and Williams introduce the show from lecterns in a mock-academic recitative number, called "Laughter," in which they examine laughter's "primary root and cause."

According to the Paley Center for Media, the sketches include the following: "Carol plays a grieving widow who is accosted at her husband's funeral by an obnoxious, loudly dressed man (Williams) who, among other things, asks inappropriate questions about the details of her spouse's death and insists that Carol keen with him; Burnett and Williams repeat the same sketch — but this time Williams unleashes his formidable ad lib gifts; Reiner and Williams have a backstage talk, which leads to a parody of Shakespeare, with Reiner performing as Laurence Olivier performing Shakespeare and Williams riffing on the Bard's characters and speeches; Carol coaxes a self-conscious Goldberg into singing a duet, called "That's a Friend"; Williams portrays an uptight businessman sitting on a park bench who is joined by hipster Goldberg, whose bongo playing brings out his wilder side; Burnett and Goldberg portray mother and daughter in a comic-poignant piece that presents the evolution of their relationship from the daughter's infancy to the mother's old age."

== Cast ==
- Carol Burnett
- Carl Reiner
- Whoopi Goldberg
- Robin Williams

== Production ==
The special was directed by Roger Beatty and Harvey Korman.

== Reception ==
John O'Connor, television critic for The New York Times praised the special describing it as "For this occasion, the star shares most of the show with her guests. Carl Reiner, Whoopi Goldberg and Robin Williams join her for the curtain raiser, a clever musical lecture on laughing, on titters and cackles, on chuckles and chortles, and especially on guffaws." He also added that the special "adds up to an affecting reminder of how one departed television format used to be surprisingly entertaining."

The Los Angeles Times critic Lee Margulies gave the special a mixed review often comparing it to The Carol Burnett Show writing, "Burnett says at the outset that the show is being taped with the same crew and in the same studio where she starred in “The Carol Burnett Show” from 1967 to 1978. With one of the same scripts, too, it seems."

== Awards and nominations ==
Year	Award	Category	Recipient(s) and nominee(s)	Result	Ref(s)
1987	Primetime Emmy Award	Outstanding Performance in a Variety or Music Program	Robin Williams	Won	
