= Adrian Cronauer =

American radio personality and lawyer (1938–2018)

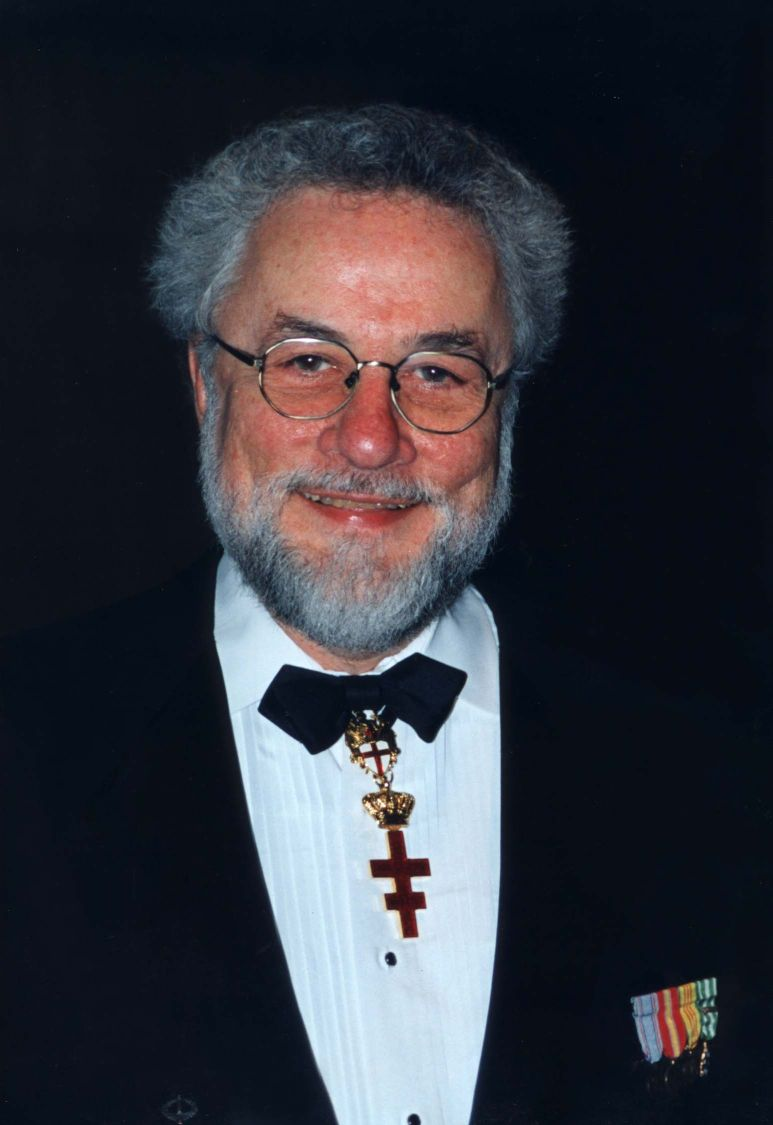
- Cronauer in 1999
- Born: Adrian Joseph Cronauer; September 8, 1938; Pittsburgh, Pennsylvania, U.S.
- Died: July 18, 2018 (aged 79); Troutville, Virginia, U.S.
- Resting place: Southwest Virginia Veterans Cemetery, Dublin, Virginia, U.S.
- Education: University of Pittsburgh
- Occupations: Radio personality; lawyer
- Known for: Good Morning, Vietnam (1987)
- Spouse: Jeane Steppe (m. 1980; died 2016)
- Children: 2
- Military career
- Allegiance: United States
- Branch: United States Air Force
- Service years: 1963–1967
- Rank: Sergeant
- Units: Armed Forces Radio and Television Service (AFRTS)
- Conflicts: Vietnam War
- Awards: Air Force Good Conduct Medal; National Defense Service Medal; Vietnam Service Medal with bronze service star; Air Force Longevity Service Award; Vietnam Gallantry Cross Unit Award; Vietnam Campaign Medal

Adrian Joseph Cronauer (September 8, 1938 – July 18, 2018) was an American radio personality and United States Air Force Sergeant, whose experiences as an innovative disc jockey on American Forces Network during the Vietnam War inspired the 1987 film Good Morning, Vietnam starring Robin Williams as Cronauer.

== Early life ==
Cronauer was born in Pittsburgh, Pennsylvania. His father was a steelworker, and his mother a teacher. He began his broadcasting career at the age of 12 as a semi-regular guest for a Pittsburgh-area children's amateur hour. Cronauer attended the University of Pittsburgh where he led a group that founded the school's first student radio station, now WPTS-FM.

== Military service ==
In the early 1960s, Cronauer chose to enlist instead of waiting for the draft. After considering flight training, which entailed a longer service commitment, Cronauer chose broadcasting and media operations, ultimately becoming a U.S. Air Force Radio and Television Broadcasting Specialist. His service spanned from 1963 to 1967.

He did his training in Texas, and eventually rose to the rank of Sergeant (E-4 at the time). While Cronauer is best known for his service in Vietnam, he began by working on training films and then was sent for a year and a half to the island of Crete in Greece, where he was stationed at Iraklion Air Station.

In 1965, Cronauer volunteered for a transfer to Vietnam because he wanted to travel. Upon arriving there, his first job was as news director for Armed Forces Radio in Saigon. When the morning host's slot became vacant shortly after his arrival, he took over the show, known as Dawn Buster because it started at 6 a.m. He opened it with the greeting "Goooooood morning Vietnam!", which was immortalized in the movie's title. Cronauer left Saigon in 1966, but DJs continued to use his signature greeting, including Pat Sajak. His military awards include the Air Force Good Conduct Medal, the National Defense Service Medal, the Vietnam Service Medal with bronze service star, the Air Force Longevity Service Award, the Vietnam Gallantry Cross Unit Award and the Vietnam Campaign Medal.

After the Vietnam war, Cronauer worked at various radio stations as a news anchor and in other capacities. He did voice-over work in New York and owned his own advertising agency, during which time he earned a master's degree in Media Studies from the New School for Social Research.

== Good Morning, Vietnam ==
In the late 1970s, while working as the classical music morning host at WVWR in Roanoke, Virginia, now Virginia Tech's WVTF, Cronauer had an idea for a television sitcom that would be a blend of M*A*S*H and WKRP in Cincinnati, two popular TV series of the era. In 1979 he tried to sell a treatment of this idea, basing the story on his experiences in Vietnam, but without success. A few years later he pitched a made-for-TV movie on the same theme: this time, a friend's agent in Hollywood got the treatment into the hands of Robin Williams, who thought the idea was good enough to warrant a feature-length movie starring himself. The film, Good Morning, Vietnam, was released in 1987.

According to Cronauer, little of the film reflects his real life. Among other things, Cronauer was not a subversive person but a "lifelong card-carrying Republican", and later took an "active role" in both Bob Dole's unsuccessful 1996 presidential campaign and George W. Bush's successful 2004 presidential reelection campaign. Cronauer taught English when off-duty in Saigon, but did not teach swear words or New York street slang. He was never in a Jeep that got hit by a land mine, but did witness the bombing of a restaurant near the radio station. In a 2014 Military Times interview, Cronauer said if he had done some of what the movie said he did, "I'd still be in Leavenworth."

The movie, directed by Barry Levinson, told a heavily fictionalized story based on a screenplay by Mitch Markowitz, a screenwriter who had worked on M*A*S*H. Cronauer later told friends that Levinson had insisted that Williams and Cronauer not meet until the film was completed, as Levinson did not want Williams to try to imitate Cronauer's actions and vocal delivery style.

== Law career and later life ==
The money Cronauer received from the movie enabled him to earn a Juris Doctor degree from the University of Pennsylvania Law School. He then founded the Cronauer Law Center and practiced law, specializing in the areas of information and communications law. In 1992, Cronauer earned awards for a special program on National Public Radio about the role of the American Forces Vietnam Network (AFVN-military radio and television).

Cronauer was active in veterans' causes, and during George W. Bush's presidency, became an adviser to the Defense Department's POW-MIA office, and a confidential advisor to the Deputy Assistant Secretary of Defense. His title was Special Assistant to the Director of the Defense Prisoner of War/Missing Personnel Office, and he was responsible for outreach to veterans and their families. He traveled widely and gave frequent media interviews and public appearances.

This led to his becoming a popular after-dinner speaker and lecturer. He appeared as a guest on radio and television talk shows such as NBC Radio's Jim Bohanan Show; NBC TV's Today show; Fox News's Hannity & Colmes, ABC's Bill Maher; and the PBS series Freedom Speaks. He appeared on the Oliver North and G. Gordon Liddy radio programs. His commentaries were featured in many newspapers and on NPR radio. He was on the board of the National D-Day Memorial, and was a trustee of the Virginia War Memorial.

=== Disbarment ===
In October 2014, the National Community Reinvestment Coalition (NCRC) filed complaints against Cronauer and the Cronauer Law Center with the Consumer Financial Protection Bureau (CFPB) and the Federal Trade Commission (FTC). The NCRC alleged that Cronauer had engaged in mortgage scams under the guise of offering assistance to property owners threatened with foreclosure. Cronauer consented to disbarment rather than contest the matter, which means that the facts and circumstances of the admitted misconduct remained confidential.

The president of the NCRC made this statement: "The rules apply to celebrities as well. We believe Mr. Cronauer and the Cronauer Law Center to be in violation of the Federal Trade Commission Act, the Mortgage Assistance Relief Act rules, and other state and federal laws."

=== Death ===
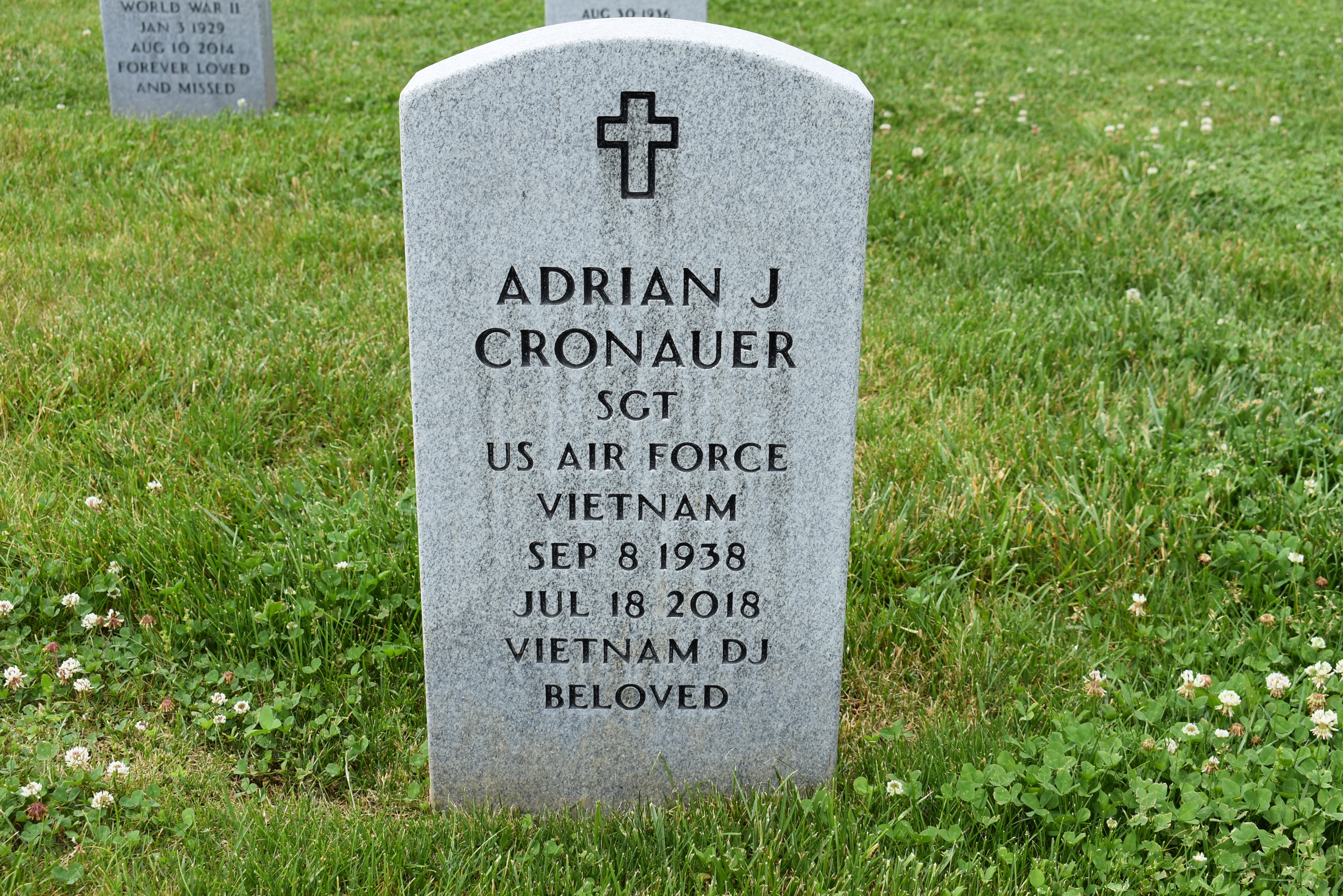
Cronauer's grave, SW Virginia Veterans Cemetery, Dublin, Virginia

Cronauer died on July 18, 2018, at a nursing home in Troutville, Virginia at the age of 79.

== Personal life ==
At the time of his death, Cronauer lived in Troutville, Virginia. He had been married to Jeane Cronauer, née Steppe, until her death in 2016.

Cronauer was a member of Mensa.

== Military awards ==
Sergeant Cronauer received the following military awards.

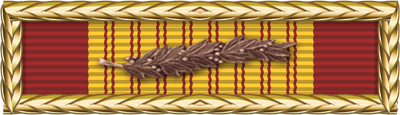

| 1st Row | Air Force Good Conduct Medal | National Defense Service Medal | Vietnam Service Medal with bronze service star |
| 2nd Row | Air Force Longevity Service Award | Vietnam Gallantry Cross Unit Award | Vietnam Campaign Medal |
