= Good Morning, Vietnam =

1987 film by Barry Levinson

- Theatrical release poster
- Directed by: Barry Levinson
- Written by: Mitch Markowitz
- Produced by: Larry Brezner; Mark Johnson
- Starring: Robin Williams; Forest Whitaker
- Cinematography: Peter Sova
- Edited by: Stu Linder
- Music by: Alex North
- Production companies: Touchstone Pictures; Silver Screen Partners III
- Distributed by: Buena Vista Pictures Distribution
- Release dates: December 23, 1987 (limited); January 15, 1988 (wide)
- Running time: 121 minutes
- Country: United States
- Language: English
- Budget: $13 million
- Box office: $123.9 million

Good Morning, Vietnam is a 1987 American war comedy drama film written by Mitch Markowitz and directed by Barry Levinson. Set in Saigon in 1965, during the Vietnam War, the film stars Robin Williams as an Armed Forces Radio Service (AFRS) DJ who proves hugely popular with the troops, but infuriates his superiors with what they call his "irreverent tendency". The story is loosely based on the experiences of AFRS DJ Adrian Cronauer.

Most of Williams's performances portraying Cronauer's radio broadcasts were improvisations. The film was released by Buena Vista Pictures (under its Touchstone Pictures banner) to critical and commercial success; for his work in the film, Williams won a Golden Globe Award for Best Actor in a Motion Picture – Musical or Comedy, and was nominated for an Academy Award for Best Actor and a BAFTA Award for Best Actor in a Leading Role. In 2000, the film ranked number 100 on the American Film Institute's "100 Years...100 Laughs" list, containing 100 movies considered the funniest movies in American cinema.

== Plot ==
In 1965, Airman First Class Adrian Cronauer arrives in Saigon to work as a DJ for the Armed Forces Radio Service. Private Edward Garlick takes him to the radio station, where his attitude and demeanor contrast sharply with those of many staff members. Cronauer's show starts with his signature, "Good morning, Vietnam!", and consists of reading strictly censored news and irreverent humor segments, mixed with rock and roll music, which is frowned on by his superiors, Second Lieutenant Steven Hauk and Sergeant Major Phillip Dickerson. Hauk adheres to strict Army guidelines with humor and music programming, while Dickerson is generally abusive to all enlisted men. However, Brigadier General Taylor and the other DJs quickly grow to like Cronauer and his eccentric brand of comedy.

Cronauer follows Trinh, a Vietnamese girl, to an English class. After bribing the teacher to let him take over, Cronauer teaches the students American slang and profanity. After the class, he tries to talk to Trinh, but is stopped by her brother, Tuan, whom Cronauer befriends and takes him to Jimmy Wah's, a local G.I. bar. Two racist soldiers initiate a confrontation that escalates into a brawl. Dickerson reprimands Cronauer for the incident, although his broadcasts continue as normal, gaining popularity from many listeners. Tuan organizes for Cronauer and Trinh to spend the day together, but she expresses no romantic interest. While relaxing at Jimmy Wah's, Cronauer is ushered outside by Tuan, saying that Trinh wants to see him. Moments later, the building explodes, killing two soldiers and leaving Cronauer shaken. Dickerson declares the news censored, but Cronauer locks himself in the studio and reports it anyway. Dickerson cuts off the broadcast, and Cronauer is suspended. Hauk takes over the show, but his poor attempts at humor lead to a flood of letters and phone calls demanding that Cronauer be reinstated.

Demoralized, Cronauer spends his time drinking and pursuing Trinh, only to be repeatedly rebuffed by her. At the radio station, Taylor intervenes, ordering Hauk to reinstate Cronauer, but he refuses to go back to work. Garlick, Tuan, and Cronauer's vehicle is stopped in a congested street, amid a convoy of soldiers from the 1st Infantry Division heading for Nha Trang, where Garlick persuades him to do an impromptu "broadcast" before they go off to fight. The soldiers' appreciation reminds Cronauer why his job is important, and he returns to work.

Dickerson seizes an opportunity to get rid of Cronauer by approving his request to interview soldiers in the field, and routing him through the Viet Cong-controlled highway to An Lộc. Cronauer and Garlick's Jeep hits a mine, and they are forced to hide from Viet Cong patrols. In Saigon, Tuan learns of the trip after Cronauer fails to show up for English class, and steals a van to go after them. After he finds them, the van breaks down, and they flag down a Marine helicopter to take them back to the city. Back at the base, Dickerson reveals to Cronauer that Tuan is a VC operative and the one responsible for the bombing at Jimmy Wah's; Dickerson has arranged for Cronauer's redeployment and honorable discharge. Taylor regretfully supports the decision, knowing the risk Cronauer's friendship with Tuan would have on the Army's reputation. Privately, Dickerson tells Cronauer that he genuinely doesn't like Cronauer or his humor. Cronauer gives Dickerson one last insult before leaving. When Dickerson tries to go after Cronauer, Taylor, having grown tired of Dickerson's petty, vindictive behavior, tells Dickerson that he's being transferred to Guam.

Cronauer confronts Trinh and convinces her to take him to where Tuan is hiding. He chases down a fleeing Tuan, decrying his actions against American soldiers. Coming out of hiding, a distraught Tuan retorts that the U.S. Army devastated his village, killing his friends and mother, thereby making the United States his enemy. Before disappearing, he comments that he still chose to save Cronauer's life at An Lộc, implying that he valued their friendship. On his way to the Tan Son Nhut Air Base with Garlick under military police escort, Cronauer sets up a quick softball game for the students in his English class, says goodbye to Trinh, and gives a taped farewell message to Garlick before boarding the plane. Taking Cronauer's place as DJ the next morning, Garlick plays the tape on the air; it begins with Cronauer exclaiming, "Goodbye, Vietnam!", and after some jokes poking fun at his leadership, Cronauer expresses his hope that all of the rest of the soldiers in Vietnam return home safely.

== Cast ==
- Robin Williams as Airman First Class Adrian Cronauer
- Forest Whitaker as Private First Class Edward Garlick
- Tung Thanh Tran as Phan Duc To / Tuan
- Chintara Sukapatana as Trinh
- Bruno Kirby as Lieutenant Steven Hauk
- Robert Wuhl as Sergeant Marty Lee Dreiwitz
- J. T. Walsh as Sergeant Major Phillip Dickerson
- Noble Willingham as General Taylor
- Richard Edson as Private Abersold
- Richard Portnow as Dan "The Man" Levitan
- Floyd Vivino as Eddie Kirk
- Juney Smith as Phil McPherson
- Củ Bà Nguyễn as Jimmy Wah
- Dan R. Stanton as Censor 1
- Don E. Stanton as Censor 2

== Production ==
The film was made on a budget of $13 million. Robin Williams was paid "less than $2 million", plus gross participation points. In 1979, Adrian Cronauer pitched a sitcom based on his experiences as an AFRS DJ. Although one of the most popular television programs of the era was the Korean War period piece, M*A*S*H, the networks were not interested, because they did not see war as comedy material. Cronauer revamped his sitcom into a script for a TV movie of the week, which eventually got the attention of Williams. Very little of Cronauer's original treatment remained after writer Mitch Markowitz was brought in.

Commenting on the accuracy of the film, the real-life Cronauer commented, "I'm very happy with it. Of course, it was never intended to be an accurate point-by-point biography. It was intended as a piece of entertainment, and (Williams) was playing a character named Adrian Cronauer who shared a lot of my experiences. But actually, he was playing Robin Williams." Williams stated that his portrayal of Cronauer in the film was only about 5% character, 95% himself. Commenting on his portrayal in the film, Cronauer said, "Anybody who has been in the military will tell you that if I did half the things in that movie, I'd still be in Leavenworth right now. A lot of Hollywood imagination went into the movie. I was a disc jockey in Vietnam and I did teach English in my spare time. I was not thrown out of Vietnam; I stayed for my full one-year tour and I was honorably discharged."

None of the people in the film are based on actual people who Cronauer met, although he described them as stereotypes of military personnel who existed at the time. The scenes in which Cronauer teaches his class to swear and use "street slang", his pursuit of Vietnamese woman Trinh (Chintara Sukapatana) and his Jeep being blown up in the jungle, among others, are constructs for the plot and never happened to Cronauer. He did, however, witness the bombing of a restaurant that he had only recently left and clashed with Army censors when prevented from reporting it. According to Cronauer, he and Williams were forbidden by Barry Levinson to meet each other because Levinson "was afraid that if Robin and I met, that Robin would somehow start to do an unconscious imitation of me, which would change his characterization". Williams and Cronauer eventually met at the film's New York premiere.

Filming took place entirely in Thailand, where temperatures exceeded 104 °F (40 °C). Although filmmakers had considered shooting in the Philippines, they decided against it due to a discouraging political climate. Locations included a meteorological station in Bangkok, Thailand, which doubled as military headquarters and dormitories.

== Reception ==
=== Critical response ===
Rotten Tomatoes gives Good Morning, Vietnam a score of 90%, based on reviews from 48 critics, with an average rating of 7.4/10. The website's critical consensus states: "A well-calibrated blend of manic comedy and poignant drama, Good Morning, Vietnam offers a captivating look at a wide range of Robin Williams' cinematic gifts." On Metacritic, the film has a score of 67%, based on reviews from 15 critics, indicating "generally favorable" reviews. Audiences surveyed by CinemaScore gave the film a grade of A−, on a scale of A+ to F.

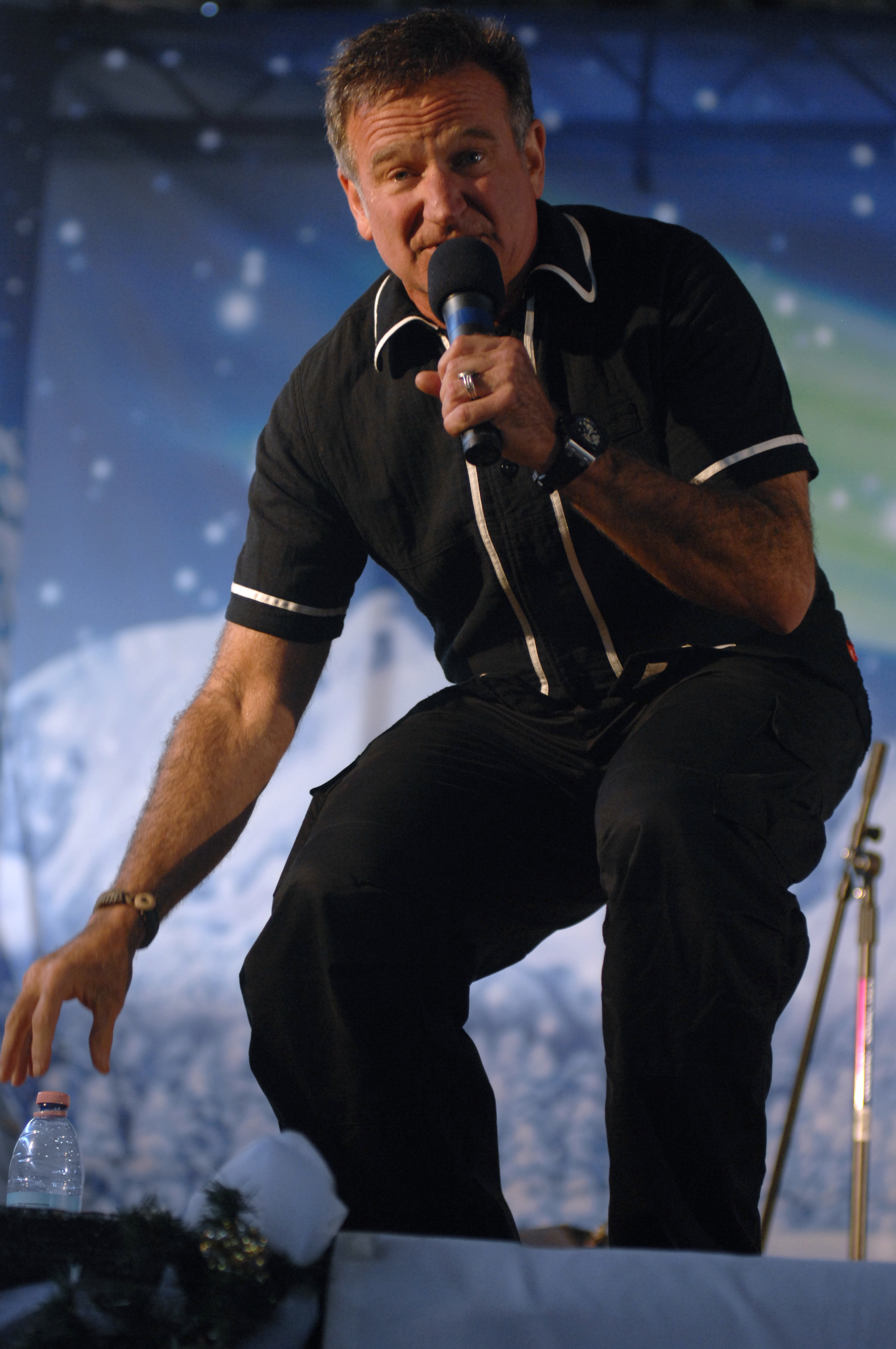
Williams's portrayal of Adrian Cronauer received widespread critical acclaim, earning him a nomination for the Academy Award for Best Actor.

Good Morning, Vietnam was one of the most successful films of the year, becoming the fourth highest-grossing film of 1987. The film received acclaim from film critics. Roger Ebert of the Chicago Sun-Times and Gene Siskel of the Chicago Tribune of the TV review show, At the Movies, awarded the film "Two Thumbs Up", with Ebert giving the film four stars out of four. Richard Corliss of Time called the film "the best military comedy since M*A*S*H", and named it one of the best films of the year.

Vincent Canby of The New York Times called the film a cinematic "tour de force", and described Williams's performance as "the work of an accomplished actor". Much of the acclaim went to Williams's performance, a role that earned him a nomination for Academy Award for Best Actor.

The film was not without detractors. Hal Hinson of The Washington Post gave the film a negative review. While praising Williams, he felt that the film was "compulsory and condescending", and that the film was merely "a Robin Williams concert movie welded clumsily onto the plot from an old Danny Kaye picture".

=== Accolades ===
Award	Category	Nominee(s)	Result
Academy Awards	Best Actor	Robin Williams	Nominated
American Comedy Awards	Funniest Actor in a Motion Picture (Leading Role)	Robin Williams	Won
ASCAP Film and Television Music Awards	Top Box Office Films	Alex North	Won
British Academy Film Awards	Best Actor in a Leading Role	Robin Williams	Nominated
British Academy Film Awards	Best Sound	Bill Phillips, Clive Winter and Terry Porter	Nominated
Golden Globe Awards	Best Actor in a Motion Picture – Musical or Comedy	Robin Williams	Won
Grammy Awards	Best Comedy Recording	Robin Williams	Won
Political Film Society Awards	Peace		Won
Political Film Society Awards	Special Award		Won
Sant Jordi Awards	Best Foreign Actor	Forest Whitaker (Also for Bird)	Won
Sant Jordi Awards	Best Foreign Actor	Robin Williams	Nominated

- AMC named Good Morning, Vietnam one of the 20 greatest war movies of all time.
- In 2000, American Film Institute included the film in AFI's 100 Years...100 Laughs (#100).

== Music ==
=== Score ===
Alex North's score was released by Intrada Records in 2017. As the complete work runs for just 17 minutes, it was paired with David Newman's Operation Dumbo Drop.

=== Soundtrack ===
The soundtrack album was certified platinum in the US. Louis Armstrong's "What a Wonderful World" was re-released as a single because of the film and reached #32 on the US Top 40, 20 years after its original release. The album won the Grammy Award for Best Comedy Album in 1989.

Track list

1. Robin Williams – "Adrian Cronauer" (2:09)
2. Martha Reeves & The Vandellas – "Nowhere to Run" (2:55)
3. The Beach Boys – "I Get Around" (2:09)
4. Wayne Fontana & The Mindbenders – "The Game of Love" (2:04)
5. Robin Williams – "Adrian Cronauer" (0:15)
6. The Searchers – "Sugar and Spice" (2:13)
7. Robin Williams – "Adrian Cronauer" (0:47)
8. The Castaways – "Liar, Liar" (1:51)
9. The Beach Boys – "The Warmth of the Sun" (2:47)
10. Robin Williams – "Adrian Cronauer" (0:34)
11. James Brown – "I Got You (I Feel Good)" (2:44)
12. Robin Williams – "Adrian Cronauer" (0:08)
13. Them – "Baby, Please Don't Go" (2:40)
14. Robin Williams – "Adrian Cronauer" (0:33)
15. The Marvelettes – "Danger Heartbreak Dead Ahead" (2:28)
16. The Vogues – "Five O'Clock World" (2:19)
17. The Rivieras – "California Sun" (2:22)
18. Robin Williams – "Adrian Cronauer" (1:21)
19. Louis Armstrong – "What a Wonderful World" (2:17)

The tracks titled "Adrian Cronauer" are comedy monologues performed by Williams, in character from the film.

Charts

Chart (1988)	Peak position
Australia (Kent Music Report)	1
Canada Top Albums/CDs (RPM)	9
New Zealand Albums (RMNZ)	8
UK Albums (Official Charts)	50
US Billboard 200	10

Certifications and sales

Region	Certification	Certified units/sales
Australia	—	150,000
New Zealand (RMNZ)	Gold	7,500^{^}
United Kingdom (BPI) 2000 release	Gold	100,000^{^}
United Kingdom (BPI) 1988 release	Gold	100,000^{^}
United States (RIAA)	Platinum	1,000,000^{^}
^{^} Shipments figures based on certification alone.

== Canceled sequel ==
In 1992, Mark Frost wrote a sequel screenplay, Good Morning, Chicago. The film would have featured Williams, reprising his role as Cronauer, as a journalist at the 1968 Democratic National Convention. The project was eventually scrapped, due to disagreements between Williams, Levinson and Disney, over the film's direction.
