= Frisbee (sculpture) =

Public artwork in Middlebury, Vermont, USA

- Artist: Patrick Villiers Farrow
- Year: 1989
- Type: bronze
- Dimensions: 170 cm × 71 cm × 91 cm (68 in × 28 in × 36 in)
- Location: Middlebury, Vermont United States; 44°0′35.09″N 73°10′39.87″W
- Owner: Middlebury College

Frisbee is a public artwork by American artist Patrick Villiers Farrow, located on the Middlebury College campus center green, in front of Munroe Hall in Middlebury, Vermont, United States. The overall dimensions of this bronze sculpture are 68 inches (170 cm) tall, 28 inches (71 cm) long, and 36 inches (91 cm) wide. It is attached to an underground concrete foundation. The sculpture was cast by Agros Art Casting Foundry, Brewster, New York and dedicated in 1989.

== Description ==
Frisbee depicts a dog leaping into the air, with three legs off the ground, catching a disc in its mouth. The dog's left hind leg is on the ground and its head is turned to the right.

The sculpture is signed by the artist on the underside of the disc along the rim, "©1989 Patrick Villiers Farrow". The founder's mark appears just after the artist's signature. An inscription, "Frisbee A Gift to Middlebury College from Gary Merrill" is also noted on the underside of the disc, along the rim. Inscribed on the raised rear paw on the toe pads are the names "Matthew" and "Cameron". The names refer to the donor's grandsons.

== Information ==
Although who was truly first played frisbee is disputed, five members of the Middlebury College Delta Upsilon fraternity claim to have been the first to toss empty Frisbie Pie Company plates to each other while traveling through Nebraska in 1939. The sculpture commemorates the college's assertion. The tradition of playing frisbee on campus greens continues at Middlebury informally as well as through organized ultimate (sport) teams, the Middlebury Pranksters.

=== Acquisition ===
The sculpture was a gift to Middlebury College from Gary Merrill. The sculpture is maintained by the Middlebury College Museum of Art through the college's Committee on Art in Public Places.

== Artist ==
Self-taught artist Patrick Villiers Farrow (1942–2009) was one of seven children born to actress Maureen O'Sullivan and film director John Farrow. Patrick Farrow moved to Vermont in 1964. Working in bronze and steel, his first solo exhibition was in Beverly Hills, California in 1967 and he became a Fellow of the National Sculpture Society in 1990.

== Documentation ==
This sculpture was documented in 1992 as part of Save Outdoor Sculpture!, a campaign organized by Heritage Preservation: The National Institute of Conservation partnered with the Smithsonian Institution, specifically the Smithsonian American Art Museum. Throughout the 1990s, over 7,000 volunteers cataloged and assessed the condition of over 30,000 publicly accessible statues, monuments, and sculptures installed as outdoor public art across the United States. In Vermont, the survey was sponsored by the Vermont Museum and Gallery Alliance from 1992 to 1993 where 110 volunteers surveyed 242 sculptures dating from 1740 to 1993. The archives from the project are maintained by the Vermont Historical Society.

== See also ==
- Bronze sculpture
