= Catch and Kill =

2019 Ronan Farrow book on media complicity in protecting sexual abusers

Catch and Kill: Lies, Spies and a Conspiracy to Protect Predators
- First edition cover
- Author: Ronan Farrow
- Audio read by: Ronan Farrow
- Illustrator: Dylan Farrow
- Language: English
- Subjects: #MeToo movement, catch and kill media practices, sex abuse culture
- Genre: Non-fiction
- Publisher: Little, Brown and Company
- Publication date: October 15, 2019
- Publication place: United States
- Media type: Print (hard and paperback), e-book, audio
- Pages: 464
- ISBN: 978-0-316-48663-7 (hardcover)
- OCLC: 1121593969
- Dewey Decimal: 331.4/133/0973
- LC Class: HV6250.4.W65 F385 2019

Catch and Kill: Lies, Spies, and a Conspiracy to Protect Predators is a 2019 book by the American journalist Ronan Farrow. He recounts the challenges he faced chasing the stories of Harvey Weinstein's decades of rape, sexual assault, and sexual abuse of women and the case against him. Farrow argues that Weinstein was able to use Black Cube, a private Israeli intelligence service, to successfully pressure executives at NBC News to kill the story there, leading him to take it to The New Yorker, where it was published and helped spark the international #MeToo movement exposing sexual abuse, mostly of women, in many industries.

The title refers to the practice of catch and kill, in which disreputable media companies purchase stories so that they can bury them. The book is published by Little, Brown and Company, and, according to Farrow, "was exhaustively vetted by Sean Lavery, a senior fact checker at The New Yorker".

== Background ==
=== Catch and kill media practice ===
Catch and kill is a covert technique—usually employed by tabloid newspapers—to prevent an individual from publicly revealing damaging information to a third party. Using a legally enforceable non-disclosure agreement, the tabloid purports to buy exclusive rights to "catch" the damaging story from the individual, but then "kills" the story for the benefit of the third party by preventing it from ever being published. The individual with the information frequently does not realize that the tabloid intends to suppress the individual's story instead of publishing it. The practice is distinct from using hush money, in which the individual is bribed by the third party to intentionally conceal the damaging information. The National Enquirer and its parent company American Media Inc. (AMI) have attracted attention for using the practice.

=== Farrow's journalism ===
Farrow has a varied background, including work for the United States Department of State, but turned to journalism in the mid-2010s. He hosted Ronan Farrow Daily, a television news program on MSNBC, then the investigative segment "Undercover with Ronan Farrow" on NBC's Today.

==== Abuse allegations against Bill Cosby and Woody Allen ====
In May 2016, The Hollywood Reporter published a guest column by Farrow in which he drew comparisons between the long-term absence of journalistic inquiry into the rape allegations leveled against Bill Cosby and the sexual abuse allegations levied against his father Woody Allen by Farrow's sister, Dylan Farrow, who was seven at the time of the alleged abuse. Farrow detailed first-hand accounts of journalists, biographers, and major publications purposefully omitting from their work decades of rape allegations targeting Cosby. Similarly, Farrow recounts the efforts of Allen's publicist, Leslee Dart—co-CEO and co-founder of a public-relations firm—to mount a media campaign focused on countering Dylan's allegations, while working at vindicating her father:

Every day, colleagues at news organizations forwarded me the emails blasted out by Allen's powerful publicist, who had years earlier orchestrated a robust publicity campaign to validate my father's sexual relationship with another one of my siblings. Those emails featured talking points ready-made to be converted into stories, complete with validators on offer—therapists, lawyers, friends, anyone willing to label a young woman confronting a powerful man as crazy, coached, vindictive. At first, they linked to blogs, then to high-profile outlets repeating the talking points—a self-perpetuating spin machine.

Farrow believed his sister Dylan and related his concerns with their father going back to when they were young children. In closing, he expressed his view that media culture actively discourages victims of abuse from coming forward. He states that victims are pressured to remain silent by threat of "having those tough newsroom conversations, making the case for burning bridges with powerful public figures" as well as "going up against angry fans and angry publicists".

==== Abuse allegations against Harvey Weinstein, start of #MeToo ====
In October 2017, The New Yorker published an investigative article by Farrow detailing allegations of sexual misconduct against film producer Harvey Weinstein five days after The New York Times published the findings of its own investigation into Weinstein by the journalists Jodi Kantor and Megan Twohey. A year prior, NBC had decided against airing Farrow's initial findings. The New Yorker won the 2018 Pulitzer Prize for Public Service for Farrow's reporting, sharing the award with Jodi Kantor and Megan Twohey at The New York Times. Farrow was included in Time magazine's "100 Most Influential People in the World" list in 2018.

The Weinstein allegations of abuse—against a rich powerful man by numerous women whose careers were in ways directed by him—kickstarted an international #MeToo movement against sexual harassment and sexual assault. The movement began to spread virally in October 2017 as a hashtag on social media in an attempt to demonstrate the widespread prevalence of misogyny, sexual assault, and harassment, especially in the workplace. It followed sexual-abuse allegations against Harvey Weinstein.

==== Abuse allegations against Eric Schneiderman, and Leslie Moonves ====
In May 2018, The New Yorker published an article by Farrow and fellow reporter Jane Mayer stating that, during his term in office, the New York State Attorney General Eric Schneiderman had physically abused at least four women with whom he had been romantically involved, and that he had habitually abused alcohol and prescription drugs. Schneiderman resigned the following day. Mayer and Farrow reported that they had confirmed the women's allegations with photographs of contusions and with statements from friends with whom the alleged victims had confided subsequent to the claimed assaults. Though he denied the allegations, Schneiderman stated that he resigned because they "effectively prevent me from leading the office's work".

Two months later, in July 2018, The New Yorker published an article by Farrow stating that six women had accused CBS CEO Leslie Moonves of harassment and intimidation, and that dozens more described abuse at his company. In September 2018, Moonves stepped down as Chairman of CBS after multiple women brought forth sexual misconduct allegations against him. Moonves allegedly destroyed evidence of his sexual misconduct.

==== Further developments ====
On August 23, 2018, The New Yorker published an article by Adam Entous and Farrow stating that top aides of the Trump White House circulated a conspiracy memo entitled "The Echo Chamber" about Obama aides.

On September 14, 2018, Farrow and Jane Mayer published information pertaining to an allegation of sexual assault by United States Supreme Court nominee, Brett Kavanaugh. The woman making the allegation was revealed to be professor Christine Blasey Ford, who would go on to testify during a Senate Judiciary Committee hearing against Kavanaugh, before his successful confirmation to the Supreme Court.

In early 2019, Farrow said he and another journalist received demands from American Media, Inc. (AMI) that sought to extort or blackmail him.

In the New York Times Ben Smith wrote in 2020 that some quotes in the book were denied by sources in the two chapters dealing with Matt Lauer's relationship with a subordinate – which unquestionably had led to Lauer admitting wrongdoing, apologizing and leaving NBC. Brooke Nevils says in the book that Lauer additionally used some intimate positions which she hadn't agreed to use.

== Reviews ==
The New York Times, The Guardian, Los Angeles Times, and NPR all reviewed the book positively, praising its reporting as important. Erin Keane also wrote in Salon that Catch and Kill was a "cinematic page turner", adding that a "compelling book that readers can't help but want to finish can make an impact." In a review for The Hollywood Reporter, Stephen Galloway called the book a "monumental work of journalism", but also wrote that its writing style was lacking.

== Adaptations ==
Catch and Kill was adapted into a nine-episode podcast based on interviews Farrow did for the book; the podcast was produced by Farrow and Pineapple Street Media. The podcast was later adapted by HBO Documentary Films into a six-part documentary miniseries, Catch and Kill: The Podcast Tapes, that aired in July 2021.
