= Catch and Kill: The Podcast Tapes =

- Genre: Documentary
- Based on: The Podcast by Ronan Farrow
- Directed by: Fenton Bailey; Randy Barbato
- Music by: David Benjamin Steinberg
- Country of origin: United States
- Original language: English
- No. of episodes: 6

Production
- Executive producers: Nancy Abraham; Lisa Heller; Ronan Farrow
- Producers: Fenton Bailey; Randy Barbato; Francy Kachler; Mona Card; Unjin Lee
- Cinematography: Jake Kerber; Huy Truong
- Editors: Francy Kachler; Johanna Gavard
- Running time: 23–29 minutes
- Production companies: HBO Documentary Films; World of Wonder

Original release
- Network: HBO
- Release: July 12 – July 26, 2021

Catch and Kill: The Podcast Tapes is an American documentary television miniseries, directed and produced by Randy Barbato and Fenton Bailey. It follows Ronan Farrow, as he conducts interviews with whistleblowers, victims, private investigators and sources for his book Catch and Kill. It consists of 6-episodes and premiered on July 12, 2021, on HBO.

== Plot ==
The series follows Ronan Farrow as he conducts interviews with whistleblowers, victims, private investigators, and other sources for his book Catch and Kill in regard to the Harvey Weinstein sexual abuse cases.

== Episodes ==
No.	Title	Directed by	Original release date	U.S. viewers (millions)
1	"The Wire"	Fenton Bailey; Randy Barbato	July 12, 2021	N/A
2	"The Reporters"	Fenton Bailey; Randy Barbato	July 12, 2021	N/A
3	"The Assistants"	Fenton Bailey; Randy Barbato	July 19, 2021	0.13
4	"The Producer"	Fenton Bailey; Randy Barbato	July 19, 2021	0.18
5	"The Editors"	Fenton Bailey; Randy Barbato	July 26, 2021	N/A
6	"The Spy"	Fenton Bailey; Randy Barbato	July 26, 2021	N/A

== Production ==
In January 2018, Ronan Farrow signed a deal with HBO to produce and star in various documentary specials for the network. HBO filmed Farrow and guests of his podcast Catch and Kill with the idea of turning it into a documentary series at some point. Production on the series took place during the COVID-19 pandemic, with HBO reaching out to Fenton Bailey and Randy Barbato about taking the filmed interviews and turning into a series.

In June 2021, it was announced Farrow would star and executive produce the series, with Fenton Bailey and Randy Barbato directing and producing under their World of Wonder banner.

== Reception ==
Review aggregator Rotten Tomatoes reported an approval rating of 88% based on 16 critic reviews, with an average rating of 6.72/10. Metacritic, which uses a weighted average, assigned a score of 74 out of 100 based on 7 critics, indicating "generally favorable reviews".
