= Cora Sue Collins =

American child actress (1927–2025)

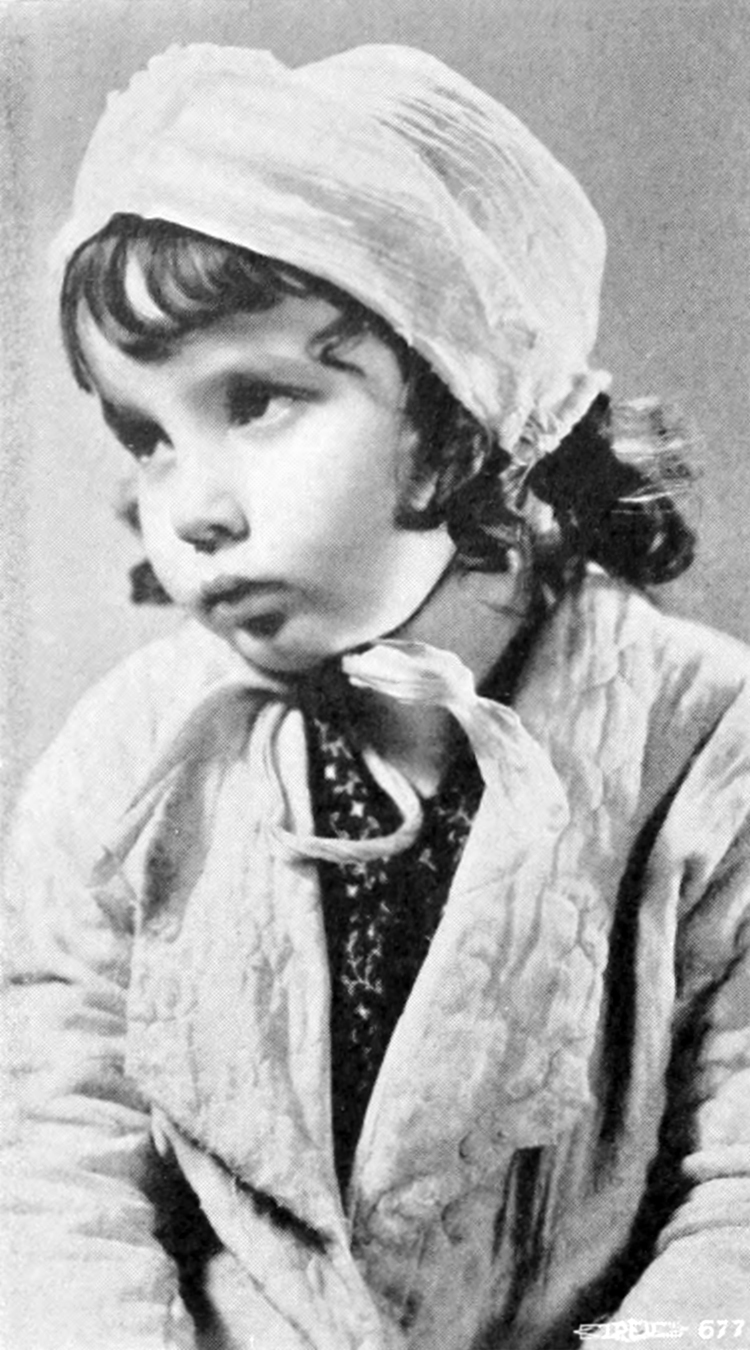
- Collins in 1931
- Born: April 19, 1927; Beckley, West Virginia, U.S.
- Died: April 27, 2025 (aged 98); Beverly Hills, California, U.S.
- Occupation: Child actress
- Years active: 1932–1945
- Known for: The Scarlet Letter; The Adventures of Tom Sawyer
- Spouses: Ivan Stauffer (m. 1943; div. 1944) (m. 1946; div. 1947) James McKay (m. 1949; div. 1955) James Morgan Cox (m. 1960; div. 1969) Harry Nace (m. 1969; died 2002)
- Children: 3

Cora Susan Collins (April 19, 1927 – April 27, 2025) was an American child actress who appeared in films during the Golden Years of Hollywood. Although she did not make the transition to a film career in adulthood, she appeared in 47 films in total.

== Early life and career ==
Cora Susan Collins was born on April 19, 1927, in Beckley, West Virginia. She later moved to Los Angeles, California, along with her mother and older sister. Collins made her acting debut in The Unexpected Father in 1932 at the age of five. She starred opposite Slim Summerville and ZaSu Pitts, playing Summerville's adoptive daughter. She appeared in the American romantic drama Smilin' Through (1932), starred Norma Shearer, Fredric March, and Leslie Howard. It was a remake of a silent film of the same name made a decade earlier, and Collins had a minor role as Shearer's character Kathleen Wayne as a young girl. Smilin' Through was nominated for the Academy Award for Best Picture for 1932, but did not win. In total, Collins appeared in five motion pictures in 1932, mainly as a supporting cast member. The films were made by different studios, such as MGM, Paramount, and Universal.

In 1933, Collins' career continued to consist mostly of playing either the leading lady's daughter, or the leading lady herself in a flashback scene. For instance in Torch Singer, she played Claudette Colbert's daughter Sally Trent, age five. (Because both mother and daughter had the same name in the film, she is often mistakenly identified as playing Colbert as a child, but Colbert’s character never appears as a child in the film.) Another example is when she was cast as Queen Christina as a child in the MGM biographical film of the same name starring Greta Garbo. Queen Christina was well-received by film critics at the time. She had a small part as the daughter of a farmer in The Prizefighter and the Lady, for which its main writer Frances Marion was nominated for an Academy Award for Best Writing, Original Story.

In 1934, Collins had a supporting role in the horror film Black Moon. She featured in Colleen Moore's last film, The Scarlet Letter. She was cast as William Powell and Myrna Loy's characters' daughter Dorothy in Evelyn Prentice, which despite its leads was not part of The Thin Man franchise. In The World Accuses she had a rare billing in the movie poster. Produced by the small studio Chesterfield Pictures, the film also features fellow child actor Dickie Moore, whom she would appear with later that year in Little Men. In the 1980s, Moore interviewed her among many other child actors for his book Twinkle, Twinkle, Little Star: But Don't Have Sex Or Take the Car. She played a princess in John Farrow's 21-minute MGM short The Spectacle Maker. It was Farrow's directorial debut and was filmed in full three-strip Technicolor. Collins' reported salary in 1934 was $250 per week (equivalent to $6,017 in 2025).

Collins was initially cast as Becky Thatcher in The Adventures of Tom Sawyer (1938), but her role was changed to Amy Lawrence because she was considered to be too tall for Tommy Kelly. She said that writer Harry Ruskin, 33 years her senior, tried to force her to have sex with him in exchange for a good role at age 15. She refused and told Louis B. Mayer about what had happened, who was nonchalant and dismissive about it. A rare leading role for Collins was in the 1945 Columbia Pictures drama Youth on Trial, in which she played the juvenile delinquent daughter of a court judge. Her last movie appearance was in 1945, after which she retired from show business at the age of 18.

== Personal life and death ==
Around 1944, Collins married Ivan Stauffer, operator of the Clover Club in Hollywood, later, a rancher in Nevada. In 1960, robbers stole two mink coats from her home while she was on vacation.

Around 1961, she married James Morgan Cox.

Collins's marriages to Ivan Stauffer and Jim Cox ended in divorce.

Collins had three children with husband James McKay, "owner of the Cal-Neva Lodge in Lake Tahoe, before he died of pneumonia while on a hunting trip in 1962".

In a 1996 article, Collins was referred to as Susie Nace and lived in Phoenix, Arizona. Her husband at the time was theatre owner Harry Leroy Nace (Harry L. Nace Theatres began after 1910 when the Harry L. Nace, Sr. moved to Phoenix and formed a partnership with Joseph Elmer Rickards. In 1915 Nace joined with Rickards founding Rickards-Nace Amusement Enterprises. In 1929 the Rickards-Nace 26 theatres were sold to Publix Theatres, with Nace remaining as general manager. Paramount Nace Theatres), who died in June 2002 at the age of 87, of an apparent suicide.

Having appeared with Greta Garbo in two films, Collins and Garbo remained in contact until Garbo's death in 1990.

Collins died from complications of a stroke at her home in Beverly Hills, California, on April 27, 2025, at the age of 98.

== Filmography ==
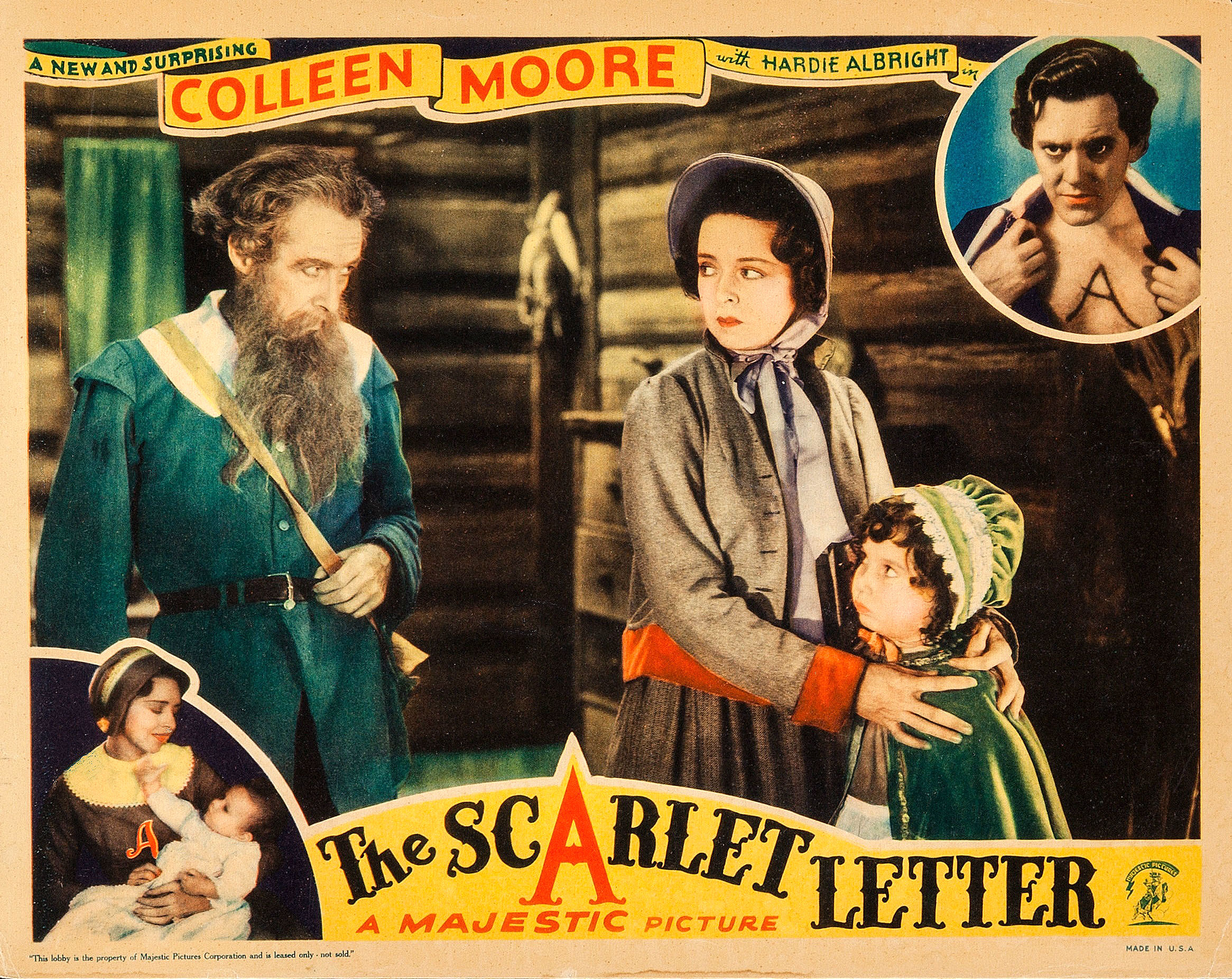
Cora Sue Collins as Pearl (in green) in The Scarlet Letter (1934)

Year	Title	Role	Notes
1932	The Unexpected Father	Pudge	
1932	The Strange Case of Clara Deane	Nancy at age 4	
1932	Smilin' Through	Young Kathleen	
1932	Silver Dollar	Maryanne Martin, as a Girl	
1932	They Just Had to Get Married	Rosalie	
1933	Picture Snatcher	Jerry's little girl	
1933	Jennie Gerhardt	Vesta at age 6	Uncredited
1933	Torch Singer	Sally at age 5	
1933	The Prizefighter and the Lady	Farmer's daughter	Uncredited
1933	The Sin of Nora Moran	Nora Moran, as a child	
1933	Queen Christina	Queen Christina, as a child	Uncredited
1933	New Deal Rhythm	Little girl	Short, uncredited
1934	Black Moon	Nancy Lane	
1934	Treasure Island	Young girl at the inn	Uncredited
1934	The Scarlet Letter	Pearl	
1934	The Spectacle Maker	The little princess	Short
1934	Caravan	Latzi, as a child	Uncredited
1934	Evelyn Prentice	Dorothy Prentice	
1934	The World Accuses	Pat Collins	
1934	Little Men	Daisy	
1935	Naughty Marietta	Felice	
1935	Public Hero No. 1	Little girl	Uncredited
1935	Mad Love	Gogol's Lame child patient	Uncredited
1935	Anna Karenina	Tania	
1935	The Dark Angel	Kitty, as a child	
1935	Two Sinners	Sally Pym	
1935	Harmony Lane	Marian Foster	
1935	Mary Burns, Fugitive	Little girl	Uncredited
1935	Magnificent Obsession	Ruth	
1936	The Harvester	Naomi Jameson	
1936	Devil's Squadron	Mary	
1936	Three Married Men	Sue Cary	
1938	The Adventures of Tom Sawyer	Amy Lawrence	
1939	Stop, Look and Love	Dora Haller	
1940	All This, and Heaven Too	Louise de Rham	Uncredited
1941	Blood and Sand	Encarnacion, as a child	Uncredited
1942	Get Hep to Love	Elaine Sterling	
1942	Johnny Doughboy	Herself	
1945	Youth on Trial	Cam Chandler	
1945	Roughly Speaking	Elinor Randall, as a girl	Uncredited
1945	Week-End at the Waldorf	Jane Rand	
