= Catch and kill =

News media manipulation

Catch and kill is a surreptitious technique employed by newspapers and media outlets to prevent an individual from publicly revealing information damaging to a third party. Using a legally enforceable non-disclosure agreement, the publisher purports to buy exclusive rights to "catch" the damaging story from the individual, but then "kills" the story for the benefit of the third party by preventing it from ever being published. The individual with the information frequently does not realize that the tabloid intends to suppress the individual's story instead of publishing it. The practice is technically distinct from using hush money, in which the individual is bribed by the third party to intentionally conceal the damaging information, but identical for all practical intents and purposes.

The National Enquirer and its parent company American Media, Inc. have attracted attention for using the practice. It may also refer to the practice of buying up competitors to eliminate competition and maintain a monopoly or oligopoly, or as an antonym to catch-and-release, a common term in flyfishing – meaning the fish is caught and then released back into the water.

== Legal and ethical questions ==
The practice of "catch and kill" raises a host of issues that permeate journalistic ethics as well as free speech, especially the freedom of the press exercised by the editor.

- Whether paying for stories violates journalistic ethics – It can be argued that payments create an incentive to embellish them, on both the source's and the journalist's side.
- Whether the practice of "catch and kill" has any relation to journalism – In a democracy, media reports enable citizens to make informed decisions.
- How contracts between media outlets and sources differ from other contracts, especially those for hush money
- Whether informants who violate contracts can avoid paying contractual damages after editors buy stories under the false pretense of publishing them
- Whether contracts or court orders that make editors publish particular stories would amount to compelled speech, which is forbidden in the US by the First Amendment
- How discarding a story after completing preliminary investigations differs from an editorial decision to not publish a story

Leonard M. Niehoff, professor of the University of Michigan Law School, concludes that both catching a story and killing it enjoys 1st Amendment protection.

== Examples ==
Instances where newspapers have been accused of using catch and kill include:

- In 2003, the National Enquirer signed a $20,000 contract with Gigi Goyette to get exclusive rights about the story of her alleged extramarital relationship with Arnold Schwarzenegger, who at the time was a candidate for Governor of California, but the newspaper never solicited further information from Goyette.

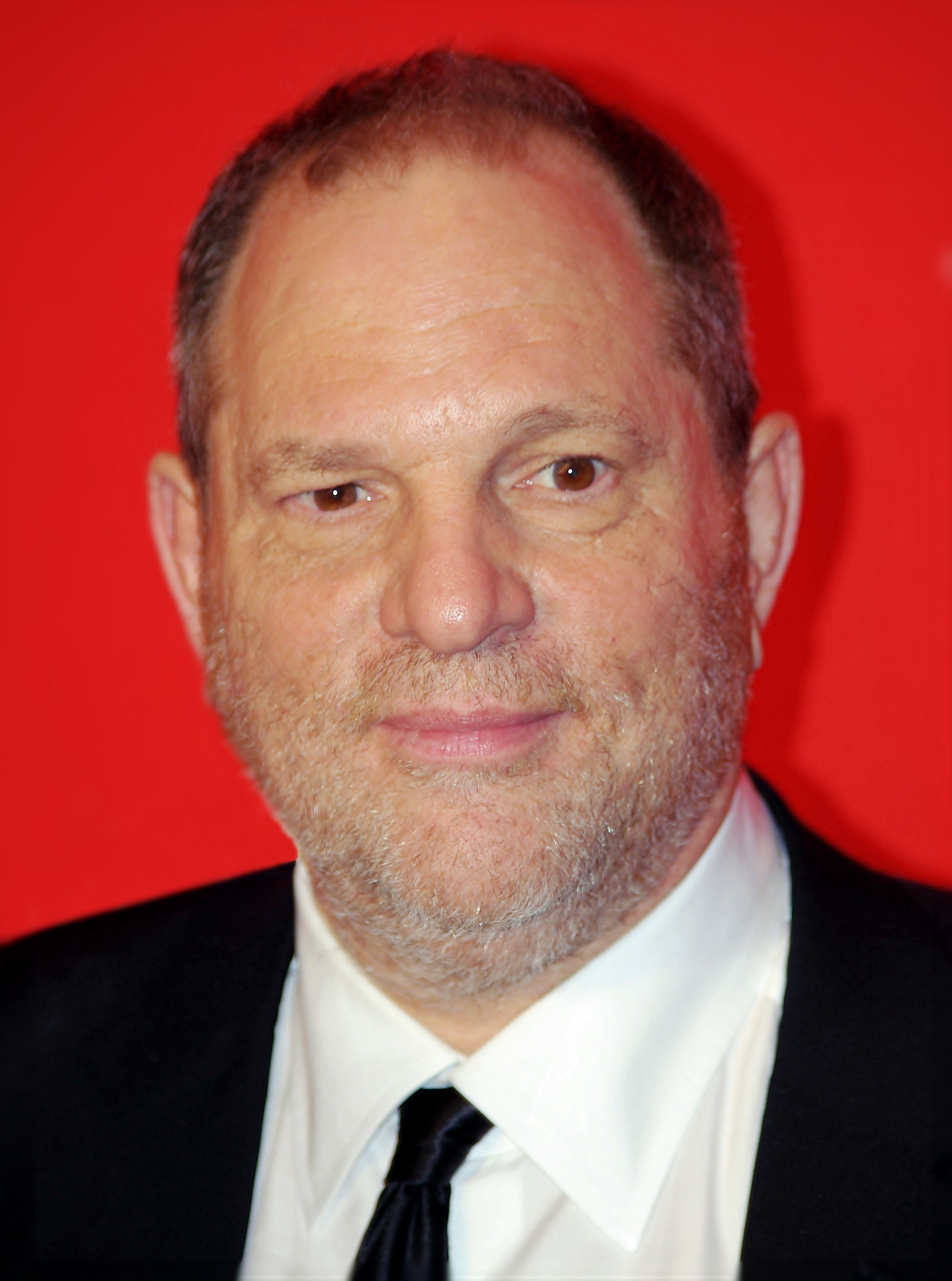
Harvey Weinstein

- In 2015, the National Enquirer allegedly approached Ambra Battilana to purchase the rights to her story about groping by Harvey Weinstein, after Weinstein asked for help from a newspaper's executive. When no agreement could be reached between the newspaper and Battilana, National Enquirer staff turned to collect damaging personal information on Battilana and other Weinstein accusers. Ronan Farrow, the reporter who broke the story about sexual abuse accusations against Weinstein, released a 2019 book entitled Catch and Kill: Lies, Spies, and a Conspiracy to Protect Predators.
- In 2015, the National Enquirer's parent company American Media paid a former doorman at Trump Tower $30,000 for the exclusive rights to his allegations that he overheard a conversation about a child Donald Trump had with a woman who is not his wife, but never published an article on the topic. In 2018, the doorman's lawyer indicated that AMI released him from his obligations to keep silent about what he said he had heard.
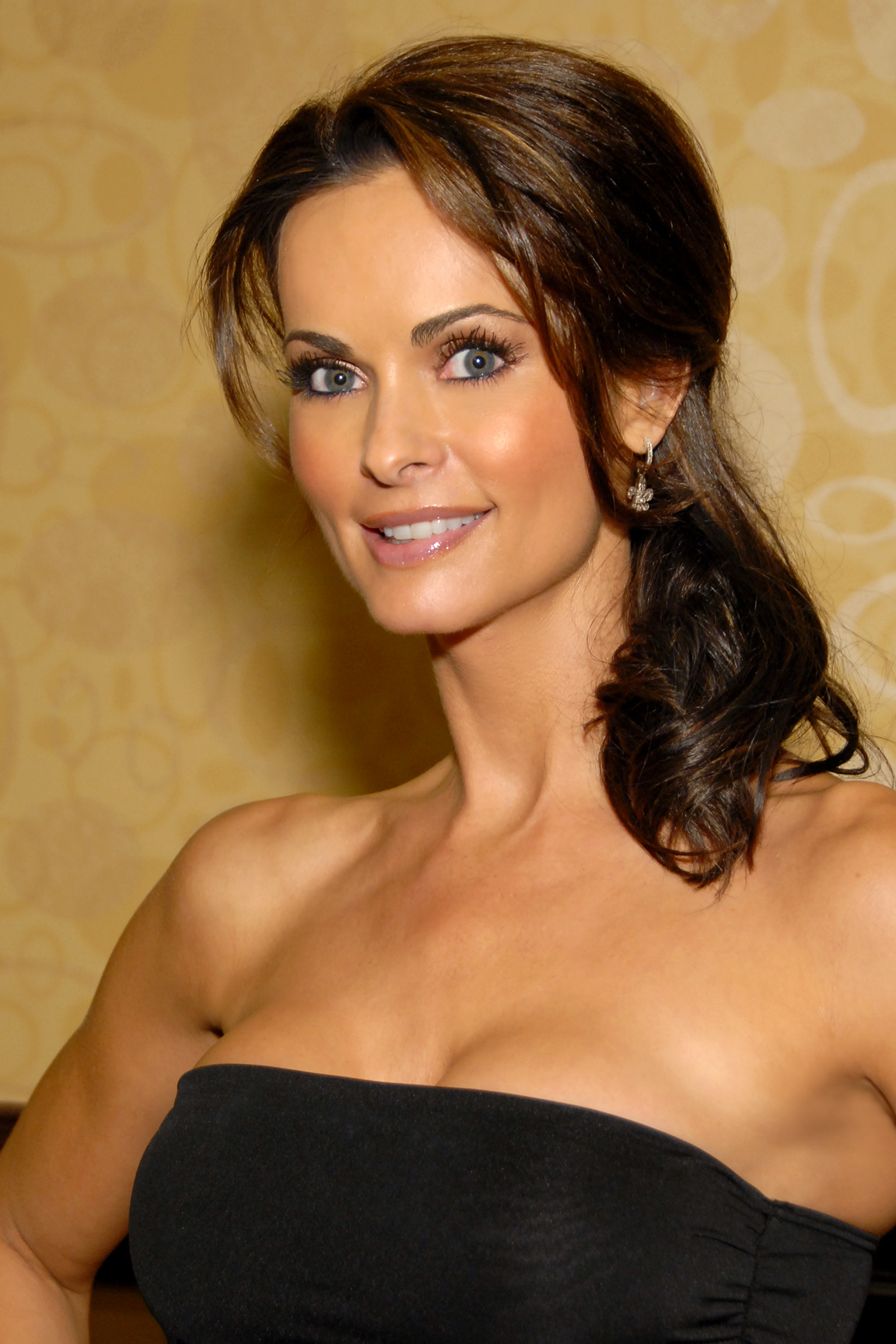
- Karen McDougal
  American Media has been accused of making a payment of $150,000 in 2016 to Karen McDougal for the story of her liaison with Trump, with no intention of publishing the story. The "life-story rights agreement" covers "exclusive ownership of her account of any romantic, personal, or physical relationship she has ever had with any 'then-married man'". In response, the publisher stated the deal included other elements such as a regular column from McDougal, and simply decided not to use the story. The CEO of American Media, David Pecker, is a friend of Trump.

== See also ==
- Stormy Daniels–Donald Trump scandal
