= The Bad One =

1930 film

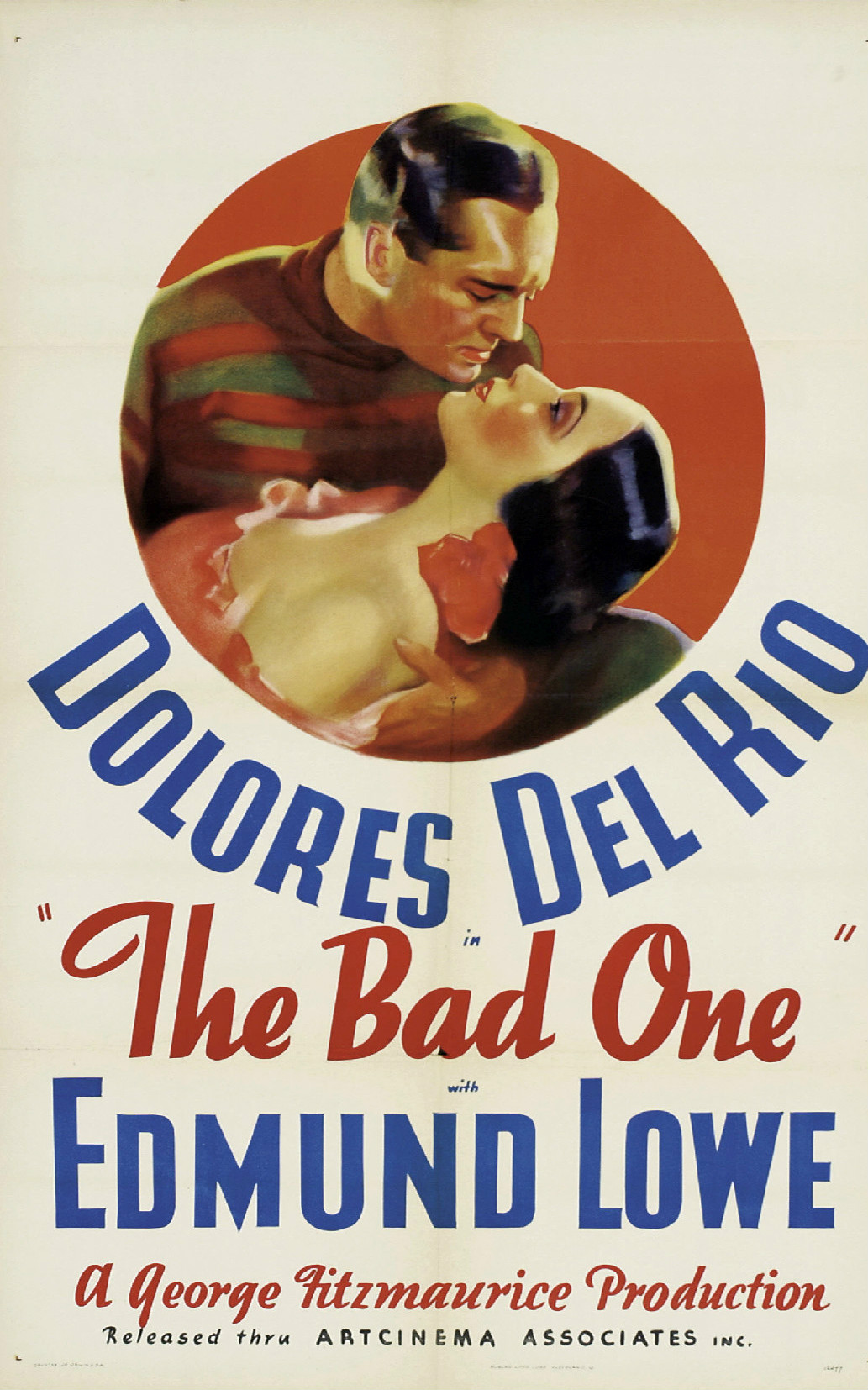
- Film poster
- Directed by: George Fitzmaurice
- Written by: Story: John Farrow; Screenplay: Howard Emmett Rogers; Carey Wilson
- Produced by: Joseph M. Schenck; John W. Considine Jr.
- Starring: Dolores del Río; Edmund Lowe
- Cinematography: Karl Struss
- Edited by: W. Donn Hayes
- Music by: Hugo Riesenfeld
- Production companies: Joseph M. Schenck Productions (for Art Cinema Corporation)
- Distributed by: United Artists
- Release date: May 3, 1930
- Running time: 70 minutes
- Country: United States
- Language: English

The Bad One is a 1930 American Pre-Code black-and-white musical film directed by George Fitzmaurice, starring Dolores del Río and Edmund Lowe, and featuring Boris Karloff. It is a romantic prison drama film.

== Cast ==
- Dolores del Río as Lita
- Edmund Lowe as Jerry Flanagan
- Don Alvarado as The Spaniard
- Blanche Friderici as Madame Durand (as Blanche Frederici)
- Adrienne D'Ambricourt as Madame Pompier
- Ullrich Haupt as Pierre Ferrande
- Mitchell Lewis as Borloff
- Ralph Lewis as Blochet
- Yola d'Avril as Gida
- John St. Polis as Judge
- Henry Kolker as Prosecutor
- George Fawcett as Warden
- Victor Potel as Sailor
- Harry Stubbs as Sailor
- Tom Dugan as Sailor
- Boris Karloff as Monsieur Gaston

== See also ==
- Boris Karloff filmography
