= The Initiation of Sarah =

1978 television film by Robert Day

- DVD cover
- Genre: Horror; Thriller
- Screenplay by: Don Ingalls; Carol Saraceno; Kenette Gfeller
- Story by: Tom Holland; Carol Saraceno
- Directed by: Robert Day
- Starring: Kay Lenz; Shelley Winters; Morgan Fairchild; Tony Bill; Morgan Brittany; Tisa Farrow
- Music by: Johnny Harris
- Country of origin: United States
- Original language: English

Production
- Executive producer: Charles W. Fries
- Producer: Jay Benson
- Production locations: Los Angeles, California, U.S.
- Cinematography: Ric Waite
- Editor: Anthony DiMarco
- Running time: 97 minutes
- Production companies: Stonehenge Productions; Charles Fries Productions; Worldvision Enterprises

Original release
- Network: ABC
- Release: February 2, 1978

The Initiation of Sarah is a 1978 American supernatural horror television film directed by Robert Day. It first aired on ABC on February 6, 1978, and starred Kay Lenz as a shy, withdrawn young woman who discovers that she has psychic powers after joining a sorority. The cast also featured Shelley Winters, Tony Bill, Kathryn Crosby, and Morgan Fairchild. The story was co-written by horror filmmaker Tom Holland, his first produced script.

== Plot ==
The film opens with Sarah, a painfully shy young woman, and her beautiful sister Patty playing on the beach at sunset. Patty wanders off to play in the surf with a young man, only for him to try to force himself on her. After a moment, the man recoils and it is implied Sarah has used telekinesis to save Patty. The scene shifts to the two sisters driving to college. On the way, Patty and Sarah discuss plans for both of them to join Alpha Nu Sigma (ΑΝΣ), as their mother had been a member. Sarah points out that she (Sarah) was adopted shortly after she was born and that Patty is their mother's only biological child. Their mother also seems to favor Patty over Sarah.

Once on campus, the girls attend a rush week party at ΑΝΣ. Patty is instantly welcomed into the sorority's clique. Because the ΑΝΣ girls do not view Sarah as a potential candidate, she is directed to the refreshment table and abandoned before being told to visit the nearby Phi Epsilon Delta (ΦΕΔ) house. The sisters both go to ΦΕΔ, where they are met with a general lack of enthusiasm from almost all the girls other than Mouse, an awkward and shy young woman who is instantly drawn to Sarah. After rush week is over, Patty is overjoyed to get into ΑΝΣ, but is somewhat hurt when she discovers that not only did Sarah not get in, but ΑΝΣ president Jennifer insists Patty not speak to Sarah, who was accepted into ΦΕΔ. This causes friction between the sisters, as Sarah is frustrated at Patty's reluctant willingness to follow Jennifer's orders.

As the semester progresses, Sarah begins to strike up a relationship of sorts with Paul, a teaching assistant for her psychology classes, and becomes somewhat closer to Mouse. She's unnerved by ΦΕΔ's house mother Mrs. Hunter, who recognizes Sarah has special powers and insists she use them to lead ΦΕΔ to glory against ΑΝΣ. It is also strongly implied that Mrs. Hunter is Sarah's biological mother, and that she and Sarah's adopted father had an affair resulting in Sarah's conception. However, this is never confirmed.

Patty continually tries to find ways to talk to Sarah, but is repeatedly unsuccessful. Jennifer's taunting of Mouse ultimately leads Sarah to use her powers to push Jennifer into a fountain. Feeling vindicated, Sarah begins to open up to the idea of her powers, but does not fully embrace them until Jennifer orchestrates a cruel prank against Sarah where she is pelted with rotten food, eggs, and mud. Mrs. Hunter uses this event to persuade Sarah to attack Jennifer, causing her (and, unintentionally, Patty) to be scalded by the shower they become trapped in. Patty leaves Jennifer's sorority after the event, while Sarah rebuffs Paul's attempts to persuade her that Mrs. Hunter is evil and Sarah should leave ΦΕΔ as well. Sarah ultimately decides to hold an initiation ceremony with Mrs. Hunter.

On the night of the ceremony, Sarah and the other ΦΕΔ's eagerly follow Mrs. Hunter's lead. Sarah notes Mouse is absent, but is pacified by Mrs. Hunter's assurances that Mouse will show up at the final portion of the night's events. As the group is led through the ceremony, the ΑΝΣ's are also going through their own initiation rites. At Mrs. Hunter's prompting, Sarah uses her powers to disrupt the ceremony, causing the wind to violently blow through the ΑΝΣ's courtyard and warp Jennifer's face into a horrific visage. However, when Sarah discovers the ΦΕΔ ceremony will end with Mouse being sacrificed, she uses her powers to stop the ceremony but ends up burning herself and Mrs. Hunter alive. The film ends with Patty deciding to join ΦΕΔ at Mouse's insistence and the two sorrowfully gaze at a picture of Patty and Sarah in happier times.

== Cast ==
- Kay Lenz as Sarah Goodwin
- Shelley Winters as Mrs. Erica Hunter
- Tony Bill as Paul Yates
- Kathryn Grant as Mrs. Goodwin
- Morgan Fairchild as Jennifer Lawrence
- Morgan Brittany as Patty Goodwin
- Robert Hays as Scott Rafferty
- Tisa Farrow as "Mouse"
- Elizabeth Stack as O'Neil
- Deborah Ryan as Bobbie Adams
- Nora Heflin as Barbara
- Talia Balsam as Allison
- Michael Talbott as Freddie
- Jennifer Gay as Kathy Anderson
- Susan Duvall as Regina Wilson

== Production ==
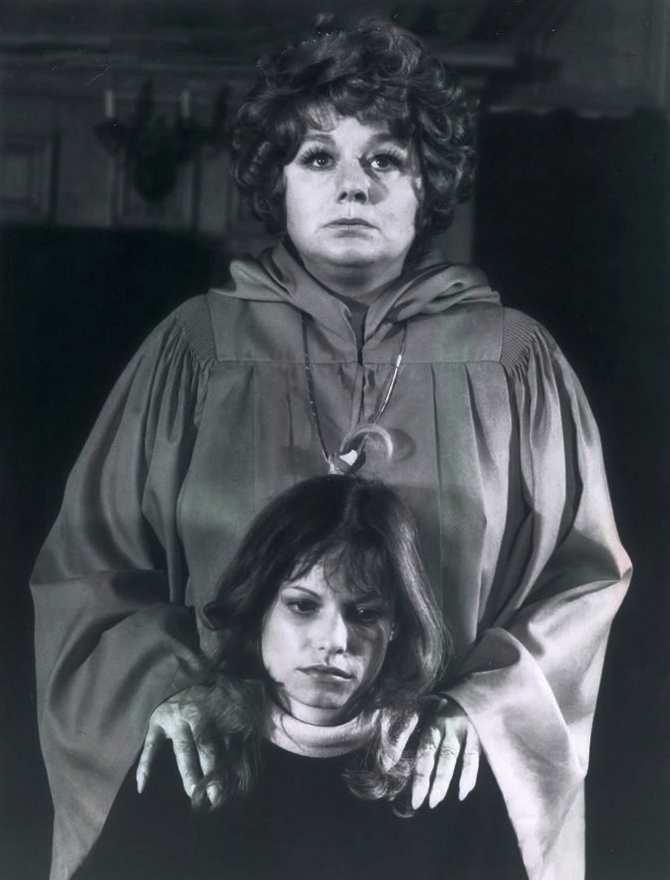
Shelley Winters and Kay Lenz in a scene from the film

Morgan Fairchild said when she signed for the film, it was agreed that she would do the shower scene wearing a body stocking, but on the day of the shot, it was suggested that she do it nude. It was going to be filmed through a foggy shower door and nobody would see anything. Fairchild said she partially acquiesced and performed topless. But the scene touched off bad feelings among the cast and crew. A veteran costumer who worked on the show said there were around 25 visitors on the set, which wasn't closed. Most of the exterior college campus scenes were filmed on the campus of the California Institute of Technology in Pasadena, California.

== Reception ==
Critical reception for the DVD release of The Initiation of Sarah has been mixed to positive. Most of the reviews shared the opinion that while the film was cheesy, they enjoyed the acting. Multiple reviewers also noted its similarity to the 1976 film Carrie, which also dealt with the subject of a female outcast that discovers telekinetic powers, comparing it unfavorably to the earlier film while still maintaining that The Initiation of Sarah was overall enjoyable.

The film achieved some controversy upon its initial airing on television as part of the film's plot involved Morgan Fairchild wearing a wet T-shirt after being thrown into a fountain, something that had not been previously shown in a made-for-TV movie. Fairchild initially regretted portraying Jennifer in the 1978 film but later changed her mind after producer Chuck Fries stated that while it was easy to find an ingenue, it was difficult to find someone who could play a convincing "bitch".

== Remake ==
The film was remade in 2006 for ABC Family and Fairchild returned to portray the mother of the titular Sarah and her sister, who was renamed Lindsay.
