= Men in Exile =

1937 film by John Farrow

- Directed by: John Farrow
- Written by: Houston Branch; Marie Baumer
- Screenplay by: Roy Chanclor
- Produced by: Bryan Foy
- Starring: Dick Purcell
- Cinematography: Arthur Todd
- Edited by: Terry Morse
- Music by: Howard Jackson
- Distributed by: Warner Bros. Pictures
- Release date: April 4, 1937
- Running time: 58 minutes
- Country: United States
- Language: English

Men in Exile is a 1937 American drama film directed by John Farrow. A "B" movie from Warner Bros. Pictures, it was the first feature Farrow directed. It is essentially a remake of their 1931 melodrama Safe in Hell, albeit with the lead switched from female to male, with some plot changes as a result.

== Plot ==
After becoming the target of a manhunt for a murder he did not commit, cab driver Jimmy Carmody flees to a tropical island that serves as a haven for criminals on the run. Soon after he arrives, he becomes involved with gun smugglers trying to overthrow the local dictator, as well as falling for the lovely daughter of the owner of the hotel he is staying at.

== Cast ==
- Dick Purcell as Jimmy Carmody
- June Travis as Sally Haines
- Victor Varconi as Colonel Gomez
- Olin Howland as H. Mortimer Jones
- Margaret Irving as Mother Haines
- Norman Willis as Rocky Crane
- Veda Ann Borg as Rita
- Alan Baxter as Danny Haines
- Carlos DeValdez as General Alcatraz
- Alec Harford as Limey
- John Alexander as Witherspoon
- Demetris Emanuel as Aide to Gomez

== Production ==
In August 1936 Warners announced they would make Men in Exile the next month. They said it was a remake of Safe in Hell (1931) and would star Humphrey Bogart and Margaret Lindsay. In October Dick Purcell and June Travis were announced as stars and John Farrow was to direct.

== Reception ==
"The direction is good and the chases are thrilling", said the Monthly Film Bulletin. "Farrow has endeavoured to dignify familiar material with a touch of Maugham but the result is not outstanding" said the Los Angeles Times.

Purcell and Travis were meant to be reunited in The Mystery of Hunting's End (which became Mystery House with Purcell and Ann Sheridan.)
