= Some Call It Loving =

1973 film by James B. Harris

- Film poster
- Directed by: James B. Harris
- Written by: James B. Harris
- Produced by: James B. Harris
- Starring: Zalman King; Carol White; Tisa Farrow; Richard Pryor
- Music by: Richard Hazard
- Distributed by: Cineglobe
- Release date: November 16, 1973
- Running time: 103 minutes
- Country: United States
- Language: English

Some Call It Loving, also known as Sleeping Beauty, is a 1973 American romantic mystery erotic drama film written, produced and directed by James B. Harris and starring Zalman King, Carol White, Tisa Farrow and Richard Pryor. It is based on a short story by John Collier.

== Plot ==
On a mansion balcony overlooking the sea, a young man, Robert Troy, approaches a woman, Scarlett, who is wearing a funeral veil. They discuss the young man who they are mourning. Troy asks Scarlett if she loved him, and she answers that she did.

Troy visits a carnival where he pays $1 to enter a "Sleeping Beauty" attraction. Inside the tent, a carny is dressed up as a doctor, alongside two women dressed as nurses. The doctor makes a show of examining the Sleeping Beauty to demonstrate that she is healthy. He announces that "red-blooded men" can pay another $1 to kiss the Sleeping Beauty to try to wake her.

After the show, Troy presses the carny for details about the woman, learning that she has been asleep for eight years. The doctor offers to leave Troy alone with her for $50. Instead, Troy asks to know how much that it will cost to buy her. The carny suggests $20,000, and Troy agrees. The carny gives Troy a bottle and explains that its contents will keep the woman asleep. Troy takes the woman back to the mansion.

Troy announces to Scarlett, who is in bed with a bald female lover, that he has purchased a Sleeping Beauty. Troy goes to his regular gig at a nightclub, where he plays baritone sax and leads a 6-piece band. After his set, he checks in with a junkie named Jeff to make sure that he is taking the pills that Troy bought for him.

Scarlett and Troy live a cloistered life of privilege in their mansion. They play elaborate games with each other and a string of women. Currently, Scarlett is pretending to run a finishing school. Her newest student is a young woman named Angelica, who dresses as a French maid and waits on Scarlett and Troy. Scarlett gently corrects mistakes in Angelica's service.

Meanwhile, the Sleeping Beauty awakens, and Troy discovers that her name is Jennifer. He gradually shows her around the house, as she acclimates to being awake for the first time in years. Together, they watch Scarlett and Angelica do a dance routine while dressed as nuns. When the jukebox switches to a tango, Troy hastily shuts it off and closes a curtain to hide the women from Jennifer. He puts her to bed. Jennifer thanks him for waking her, quoting Alfred Tennyson's "Sleeping Beauty": "I'd sleep another hundred years, O love, for such another kiss". Troy jokes that he did not kiss Jennifer to wake her, and she responds that she did not sleep for 100 years.

Troy heads downstairs, turns the jukebox back on, and lifts the curtain. Scarlett and Angelica have remained frozen in the same position from when Troy closed the curtain. The resume their dance.

The next day, Troy and Jennifer dress up and go on a date to the jazz club, which is empty save for Jeff. Troy plays a song and dedicates it to the two people who he loves the most, Jeff and Jennifer. When he comes home, he announces to Scarlett that he is going to take Jennifer away. He explains that he is having genuine feelings when he interacts with Jennifer. After so many years of the pretenses that he and Scarlett employ to amuse themselves, he is shocked to find that he does not want to create a false reality with Jennifer.

Scarlett convinces Troy to let Jennifer stay for a while to ascertain if his feelings are genuine. At the club after closing, Troy has a waitress dance topless as a cheerleader for him. He gives her a very elaborate premise about for whom she is rooting, and he encourages her to make it more genuine. She takes off her skirt and tries one more time, but Troy has gone home, where he has sex with Jennifer for the first time.

Realizing that his feelings are indeed real, he takes Jennifer away from the mansion in the Sleeping Beauty van included with his purchase of her. After a little while away, they return to the mansion where Scarlett and Angelica don their nun costumes. Scarlett reveals that Angelica shaved her head to join their order. Troy puts on a priest costume and Scarlett pretends to initiate Jennifer as a novice. Troy is heartbroken by the ruse. He pours some of the sleeping potion into the wine that Jennifer must drink during the ceremony.

Realizing that Troy does not want to keep up the pretense, Jennifer asks him why he does not want to continue the game. She explains that she wants to keep playing the game forever, as if she were a child. As she grows tired from the potion, Troy tearfully picks her up and carries her away. The film ends with Jennifer back in the Sleeping Beauty tent. Troy is now playing the role of the doctor, and Scarlett plays his nurse.

== Cast ==
- Zalman King as Robert Troy
- Carol White as Scarlett
- Tisa Farrow as Jennifer
- Richard Pryor as Jeff
- Veronica Anderson as Angelica
- Logan Ramsey as carnival doctor
- Brandy Herred as nude cheerleader
- Pat Priest as carnival nurse

== Production ==
James B. Harris found John Collier's story in Fancies and Goodnights while doing research for Stanley Kubrick's Lolita. In the original, the Sleeping Beauty is so unlikable when she awakes that the man puts her back to sleep. Harris was more interested in a relationship that soured because of the man's inability to escape his own obsessions.

The baritone saxophone solos in the film were recorded by Ronnie Lang. The rest of the band consisted of Conte Candoli (trumpet), Bob Brookmeyer (trombone), Dave Grusin (keyboard), Ray Brown (bass) and Stan Levey (drums).

== Reception ==
James B. Harris was invited to the Director's Fortnight at the 1973 Cannes Film Festival, where the film was received well. He explained the decision to make Troy a jazz musician was meant to underscore the games he plays with Scarlett. Troy has a "jazz mentality that prefers 'playing variations' to 'playing the melody'".

American reviewers tended to dismiss the film as "a rambling, contemporary fable that is merely pretentious".
