= The Spectacle Maker =

- Film Poster
- Directed by: John Farrow
- Screenplay by: John Farrow
- Based on: The Magic Glasses; 1913 story by Frank Harris
- Starring: Christian Rub
- Cinematography: Ray Rennahan
- Music by: Herbert Stothart
- Production company: Metro-Goldwyn-Mayer
- Distributed by: Metro-Goldwyn-Mayer
- Release date: 1934
- Running time: 21 minutes
- Country: United States
- Language: English

The Spectacle Maker is a 1934 short film directed by John Farrow and starring Christian Rub. It was Farrow's directorial debut. It was filmed in full three-strip Technicolor.

== Plot summary ==
Once upon a time, Peter, a lame boy who requires a crutch to walk, dreams of being able to dance like all the other children. His grandfather, Hans Schmidt, the village's spectacle maker, is presented with an opportunity by a mysterious man who walks into his shop: make a lens that when looked through makes everything and everyone appear beautiful, in return for his shop being filled with gold. Hans wants to oblige if only to be able to fix Peter's leg, but first Hans has to learn what beauty actually is. In consulting with the wisest source he knows, Hans is able to produce such a lens which makes everything and everyone on the surface appear beautiful on the surface, and in return he is showered with gold. Another mysterious man comes forth explaining to Hans that the spectacle is deceitful in hiding the ugliness that hides underneath, and that he should produce a lens that should bring forth the truth to the surface. Hans, once again going through the process, does produce such a lens, however at the possible expense to his life as it does expose the ugliness of the souls of some important people, namely the Duke and Duchess. In the end, the truth, in its power, may set them all free.

== Cast ==
- Christian Rub as Hans Schmitt
- Douglas Scott as Peter
- Nora Cecil as Duchess
- Harvey Clark as The Grand Duke
- Cora Sue Collins as The Little Princess
- Nigel De Brulier as The Man in Black
- Sumner Getchell as Lens Buyer
- Angelo Rossitto as Court Jester (uncredited)
- Robert Taylor as The Duchess's Paramour
