= Prudence Farrow =

American meditation instructor, film producer, and writer

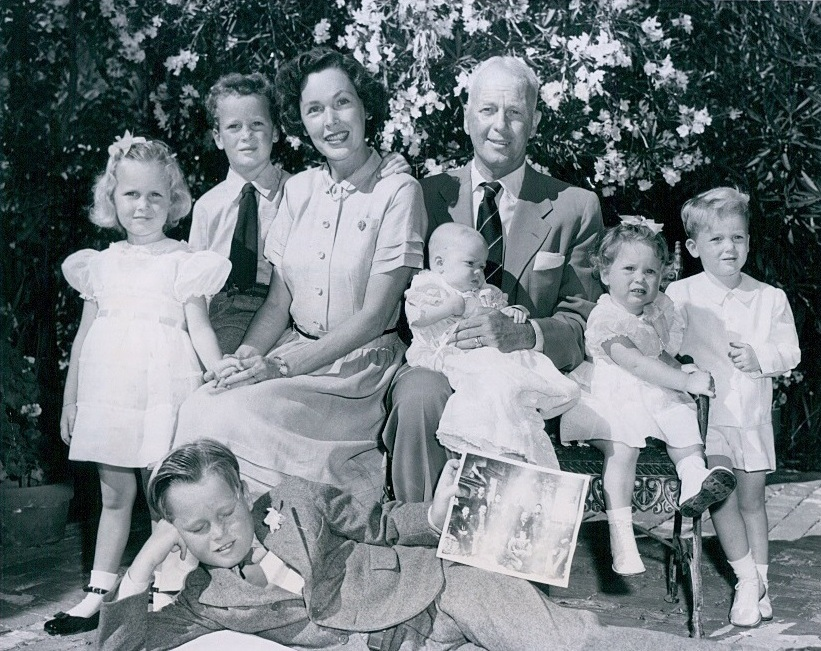
- Prudence Farrow, second from right, aged two
- Born: Prudence Anne Villiers Farrow; January 20, 1948 (age 78); Los Angeles, California, U.S.
- Education: University of California, Berkeley; University of California, Los Angeles
- Occupations: Author; meditation teacher; producer
- Spouse: Albert Bruns (m. 1969)
- Children: 3
- Parent: John Farrow; Maureen O'Sullivan
- Relatives: Patrick Villiers Farrow (brother); Mia Farrow (sister); Tisa Farrow (sister); Ronan Farrow (nephew)

Prudence Anne Villiers Farrow Bruns (born January 20, 1948) is an American author, meditation teacher, and film producer. She is a daughter of film director John Farrow and actress Maureen O'Sullivan and younger sister of actress Mia Farrow. Farrow is the subject of the Beatles song "Dear Prudence", which references her time studying Transcendental Meditation in Rishikesh with the Beatles in early 1968.

== Early life ==
Farrow was raised as a Catholic and attended convent schools. She learned the Transcendental Meditation technique (TM) in 1966 at UCLA, and the next year became interested in yoga, opening a yoga institute at a former church in Boston. In 1968, Farrow, along with her sister Mia and brother Johnny, traveled with Maharishi Mahesh Yogi from New York to India, and then to the Maharishi's ashram in Rishikesh for a Transcendental Meditation teacher training course.

The Beatles arrived shortly thereafter. Farrow was dedicated to practicing the TM technique so she could become a TM teacher. She said: "I would always rush straight back to my room after lectures and meals so I could meditate. John, George and Paul would all want to sit around jamming and having a good time and I'd be flying into my room. They were all serious about what they were doing, but they just weren't as fanatical as me". She "turned into a near recluse" and "rarely came out" of her cottage. Lennon was asked to "contact her and make sure she came out more often to socialize" and he wrote the song "Dear Prudence". According to Lennon, "She'd been locked in for three weeks and was trying to reach God quicker than anyone else".

== Career ==
Farrow taught TM for several decades after her teacher training course in India. Among those she mentored was comedian Andy Kaufman. She returned to India for further instruction from the Maharishi in 1986 and has taught Transcendental Meditation in Florida since 1970.

Later in her life, Farrow earned a BA, an MA, and a PhD from the University of California, Berkeley, where she majored in Asian studies. Her doctoral dissertation was on pulse diagnosis, titled Nadivijnana, the Crest-Jewel of Ayurveda: A Translation of Six Central Texts and an Examination of the Sources, Influences and Development of Indian Pulse-Diagnosis. Farrow became an elementary school teacher and according to her résumé she has held teaching positions or presented at conferences held at the University of California at Berkeley, Rutgers University and the University of Wisconsin.

Farrow has worked in the theater and film industry as a production assistant on The Muppets Take Manhattan (1984) and the art department coordinator for The Purple Rose of Cairo (1985). She also "conceived and co-produced" the film Widows' Peak (1994), which featured her sister, Mia, in a part originally written for their mother, Maureen O'Sullivan. In 1999, she was one of four producers involved in staging Up From the Ground at the Westbeth Theatre in New York City.

Farrow became a magazine writer in the 2000s. Using her married name, Prudence Bruns, she has authored articles on Asian studies, world religions, ayurveda, and healthy living. In 2012, Farrow established the non-profit Dear Prudence Foundation to raise funds for a documentary film of the 2013 Kumbh Mela festival which is held in India every twelve years.

== Personal life ==
Farrow married teacher Albert Morrill Bruns in December 1969. They have three children and four grandchildren.

Farrow was also known to have been in a relationship with later-convicted murderer Robert Durst, whom she dated for three years up to 1982.
