= Search and Destroy (1979 film) =

- Directed by: William Fruet
- Written by: Don Enright
- Produced by: James Margellos
- Starring: Perry King; Don Stroud; Tisa Farrow
- Cinematography: René Verzier
- Music by: Martin Deller; Cameron Hawkins; Ben Mink
- Release date: 1979
- Language: English

Search and Destroy is a 1979 Canadian action-thriller film directed by William Fruet and starring Perry King, Don Stroud, and Tisa Farrow.

== Plot ==
Members of a Vietnam veteran's old Army unit start turning up dead in Los Angeles and Niagara Falls. Ex-Colonel Kip Moore (Perry King), is pressed by Upstate New York police for details. Meanwhile, a mysterious killer with a black glove is on the loose.

== Cast ==
- Perry King as Kip Moore
- Don Stroud as Buddy Grant
- Tisa Farrow as Kate Barthel
- George Kennedy as Anthony Fusqua
- Jong Soo Park as Assassin
- Tony Sheer as Frank Malone
- Phil Aikin as Rosie Washington
- Rummy Bishop as Ernie Cappel
- Daniel Buccos as Sinclair
- Rob Garrison as R.J.

== Reception ==
Really Awful Movies called it..."Great Canadian exploitation fun," while TV Guide said Search and Destroy was an "empty variation on the "let's win in Vietnam" theme that emerged in the years following the American defeat."
