= Patrick Villiers Farrow =

American sculptor

- Born: November 27, 1942; Los Angeles, California, U.S.
- Died: June 15, 2009 (aged 66); Castleton, Vermont, U.S.
- Occupation: Sculptor
- Spouse: Susan Hartwell-Erb (m. 1966)
- Parent(s): John Farrow; Maureen O'Sullivan
- Relatives: Mia Farrow (sister); Prudence Farrow (sister); Tisa Farrow (sister); Ronan Farrow (nephew)

Patrick Villiers Farrow (November 27, 1942 – June 15, 2009) was an American sculptor and a peace and environmental activist.

== Early life ==
Farrow was the son of actress Maureen O'Sullivan and writer-director-producer John Villiers Farrow. He had one older brother, Michael, and five younger siblings, including actresses Mia and Tisa, John, Prudence, and Stephanie. He grew up in Beverly Hills and went abroad to Spain and England.

His early jobs included acting in Hollywood in both TV and movies, serving as a Merchant Marine in the Pacific and working as an artist for WPAT radio station in New York City. He moved to Vermont in 1964. In 1966, he married Susan Hartwell Erb.

== Career ==
A self-taught artist, Farrow had his first solo art show in 1967 at a Beverly Hills gallery. In 1990, he was elected a Fellow in the National Sculpture Society in New York City. In 1993, he bought a historic church in Castleton, Vermont, turning it into a home, studio, and art gallery.

His public sculpture Frisbee is located on the Middlebury College campus center green. In 1984, Farrow raised $20,000 to pay for the installation of another, "The Leash," in nearby Rutland.

== Death ==
On June 15, 2009, Farrow was found in his home, dead from a gunshot wound. The cause of death was determined to be suicide.
