= The World Accuses =

1934 film by Charles Lamont

- Directed by: Charles Lamont
- Written by: Charles Belden
- Produced by: Lon Young
- Starring: Vivian Tobin; Dickie Moore; Cora Sue Collins
- Cinematography: M.A. Anderson
- Edited by: Roland D. Reed
- Production company: Chesterfield Pictures
- Distributed by: Chesterfield Pictures
- Release date: November 12, 1934
- Running time: 62 minutes
- Country: United States
- Language: English

The World Accuses is a 1934 American drama film directed by Charles Lamont and starring Vivian Tobin, Dickie Moore and Cora Sue Collins.

== Cast ==
- Vivian Tobin as Lola Weymouth
- Dickie Moore as Tommy Weymouth
- Cora Sue Collins as 'Pat' Collins
- Russell Hopton as Hugh Collins
- Harold Huber as 'Checkers' Fraley
- Mary Carr as Mrs. Warren
- Paul Fix as John Weymouth
- Sarah Edwards as Lucille Weymouth
- Robert Elliott as Lt. Ryan
- Jameson Thomas as Jerome Rogers
- Bryant Washburn as Attorney Barrett
- Robert Frazer as Attorney Hopper
- Broderick O'Farrell as Dr. Jarvis
- Lloyd Ingraham as The Judge
- Jane Keckley as Nora
- Barbara Bedford as Martha Rankin

== Bibliography ==
- Michael R. Pitts. Poverty Row Studios, 1929–1940: An Illustrated History of 55 Independent Film Companies, with a Filmography for Each. McFarland & Company, 2005.
