= She Loved a Fireman =

1937 film by John Farrow

- Directed by: John Farrow
- Written by: Carlton Sand; Morton Grant
- Produced by: Bryan Foy
- Starring: Dick Foran
- Cinematography: L. Wm. O'Connell
- Edited by: Thomas Pratt
- Music by: Howard Jackson
- Production company: Warner Bros. Pictures
- Distributed by: Warner Bros. Pictures
- Release date: December 18, 1937
- Running time: 58 minutes
- Country: United States
- Language: English

She Loved a Fireman is a 1937 American action drama film directed by John Farrow and starring Dick Foran and Ann Sheridan.

It was also known as I Loved a Fireman and Two Platoons.

== Plot ==
Red Tyler becomes a fireman at a station captained by Captain Shannon.

== Cast ==
- Dick Foran as James 'Red' Tyler
- Ann Sheridan as Marjorie 'Margie' Shannon
- Robert Armstrong as Capt. Smokey Shannon
- Eddie Acuff as Skillet Michaels
- Veda Ann Borg as Betty Williams

== Production ==
The film was based on an original story by Charleton Sand. Dick Foran star of Warners' B Westerns was given the lead role and John Farrow assigned to direct. Filming started 29 June 1937.

== Reception ==
"Our advice would be to look around for the nearest exit", said the New York Times.
