= Stranded (1987 film) =

- Theatrical release poster
- Directed by: Tex Fuller
- Written by: Alan Castle
- Produced by: Mark Levinson; Scott M. Rosenfelt
- Starring: Ione Skye; Maureen O'Sullivan; Joe Morton; Susan Barnes; Cameron Dye; Michael Greene
- Cinematography: Jeff Jur
- Edited by: Stephen E. Rivkin
- Music by: Stacy Widelitz
- Production company: New Line Cinema
- Distributed by: New Line Cinema
- Release date: November 20, 1987
- Running time: 80 minutes
- Country: United States
- Language: English
- Budget: $3 million

Stranded is a 1987 American science fiction horror film directed by Tex Fuller, written by Alan Castle, and starring Ione Skye, Maureen O'Sullivan, Joe Morton, Susan Barnes, Cameron Dye, and Michael Greene. It was released on November 20, 1987, by New Line Cinema.

== Plot ==
A grandmother, Grace Clark, and granddaughter, Deirdre Clark, live on a remote farm in the remote American South. They find themselves hostages of a family of aliens who crash land near their home. The aliens are escapees from a war-torn world hoping to hide on Earth. Due to a misunderstanding, the aliens kill the granddaughter's boyfriend, and this leads to their discovery and being attacked by the locals.

The locals have been worked into a frenzy by the killed boy's father, a local hothead, which quickly devolves into a hostage situation. Hollis McMann, an African-American sheriff, tries to control the situation and get everyone, aliens included, out alive. His efforts are made more difficult by the alien family's robot guard, an alien assassin from the family's home world, and the prejudice of his own deputies and the locals.

== Cast ==
- Ione Skye as Deirdre Clark
- Maureen O'Sullivan as Grace Clark
- Joe Morton as Sheriff McMahon
- Susan Barnes as Helen Anderson
- Cameron Dye as Lieutenant Scott
- Michael Greene as Vernon Burdett
- Gary Swanson as Sergeant
- Harry Caesar as Officer Miller
- Kevin Haley as Jerry
- Nathan Le Grand as Officer Roberts
- Jeff Levine as Officer Sweeney
- Brendan Hughes as Prince
- Flea as Jester the Alien
- Spice Williams-Crosby as Warrior
- Dennis Vero as Sir
- Florence Schauffler as Queen

== Production ==
Stranded marked the feature directorial debut of Tex Fuller, who had previously worked as a photojournalist and documentarian. After failed attempts at selling a feature adaptation of his 1977 documentary Death Row, Fuller instead decided a lower-budgeted more high-concept film would be a better method of establishing himself. Fuller came across Alan Castle's script for Shockwave (which was retitled to Stranded to avoid confusion with Shock Waves) with Fuller quite taken with the scripts themes of fear and intolerance mixed with a high-tension home invasion setup. After taking the script to producers Mark Levinson and Scott Rosenfelt, the film was put into production after the two responded positively to the script.

== Release ==
New Line Cinema gave the film a gradual release by region in late 1987.

== Reception ==
The Washington Post found the film to be the kind of "picture a company will just throw out into the market, hoping to cop a quick buck". It found the acting, direction, special effects, and lighting to be lacking.
