= Tisa Farrow =

American actress and model (1951–2024)

- Farrow in Zombi 2, 1979
- Born: Theresa Magdalena Farrow; July 22, 1951; Los Angeles, California, U.S.
- Died: January 10, 2024 (aged 72); Rutland, Vermont, U.S.
- Occupation: Actress
- Years active: 1970–1980
- Spouse(s): Terry Deane (divorced); John Bushey (divorced)
- Children: Bridget Marie Farrow Bushey; Jason Farrow Dene (Sgt. 1st Class)
- Parents: John Farrow (father); Maureen O'Sullivan (mother)
- Relatives: Patrick Villiers Farrow (brother); Mia Farrow (sister); Prudence Farrow (sister); Ronan Farrow (nephew); Moses Farrow (nephew); Soon-Yi Previn (niece)

Theresa Magdalena "Tisa" Farrow (July 22, 1951 – January 10, 2024) was an American actress and model.

== Early life ==
Theresa Magdalena Farrow was born in Los Angeles, California, on July 22, 1951, a daughter of Irish-born actress Maureen O'Sullivan and Australian-born film director John Farrow. She was the youngest of their four girls and three boys; her siblings are Mia (b. 1945), Prudence, Stephanie, Michael Damien, Patrick Joseph, and John Charles.

Like most of her siblings, Tisa received a strict and mainly Catholic education. In her high-school freshman year she enrolled at the progressive New Lincoln School in New York City. She left school of her own volition in the middle of the 11th grade. She then worked as a waitress. In her own words, she also "spent a long time going around town trying out for commercials" - with no success: "I would always run into some career woman who disliked me right away because she didn't like my sister Mia."

== Career ==
Farrow's first film role was in Homer (1970). Farrow then starred in René Clément's And Hope to Die (1972), the drama Some Call It Loving (1973), and the comedy Only God Knows (1974).

Farrow was featured semi-nude in a photo article in the July 1973 issue of Playboy, photographed by Mario Casilli.

In the second half of the 1970s, Farrow acted in the Italian-Canadian action thriller Strange Shadows in an Empty Room (1976) directed by Alberto de Martino, and starred in the made-for-television horror film The Initiation of Sarah (1978), James Toback's first feature production Fingers (1978) alongside Harvey Keitel, and in the Canadian film Search and Destroy (1979).

In Woody Allen's Manhattan (1979), she has a cameo appearance.

From mid-1979 to 1980, Farrow took leading roles in three Italian genre films: in Lucio Fulci's horror film Zombi 2 (1979), Antonio Margheriti's Vietnam War film The Last Hunter (1980), and Joe D'Amato's horror film Antropophagus (1980).

== Death ==
Farrow died in her sleep of cardiopulmonary disease, in Rutland, Vermont, on January 10, 2024, at the age of 72.

== Filmography ==
Film
Year	Title	Role	Notes
1970	Homer	Laurie Grainger	
1972	La course du lièvre à travers les champs	Pepper	English title: And Hope to Die
1973	Some Call It Loving	Jennifer	Alternatively titled: Sleeping Beauty
1974	Only God Knows	Terry Sullivan	
1976	Una magnum special per Tony Saitta	Julie Foster	English title: Strange Shadows in an Empty Room
1978	The Initiation of Sarah	Alberta 'Mouse'	TV movie
1978	Fingers	Carol	
1979	Search and Destroy	Kate Barthel	
1979	The Ordeal of Patty Hearst	Gabi	TV movie
1979	Manhattan	Party Guest	
1979	Winter Kills	Nurse Two	
1979	Zombi 2	Anne Bolt	English titles: Zombie, Zombie Flesh Eaters
1979	One Who Was There	Young Mary Magdalene	Short film
1980	Antropophagus	Julie	English title: The Grim Reaper (commonly known) (Note: The film was also titled Anthropophagus: The Grim Reaper and The Anthropophagous Beast, where Farrow's voice was dubbed by Carolyn De Fonseca.)
1980	L'ultimo cacciatore	Jane Foster	English titles: The Last Hunter, Hunter of the Apocalypse (Note: Farrow's voice was dubbed by Pat Starke.)

Television self-appearances
Year	Title	Notes
1969	The Generation Gap	Contestant (season 1, episode 3)
2021	Allen v. Farrow	Documentary miniseries (2 episodes)
