= Ronan Farrow Daily =

- Genre: Political news/opinion program
- Presented by: Ronan Farrow
- Country of origin: United States
- Original language: English

Production
- Camera setup: Multi-camera
- Running time: 60 minutes

Original release
- Network: MSNBC
- Release: February 24, 2014 – February 27, 2015

Ronan Farrow Daily was a television news program hosted by Ronan Farrow, which aired on MSNBC from February 24, 2014 through February 27, 2015.

In February 2014, Farrow received the third annual Cronkite Award for Excellence in Exploration and Journalism from Reach the World, in recognition of his work since 2001, including his being a UNICEF Spokesperson for Youth in 2001. The awarding was criticised by some media outlets as coming just three days after Ronan Farrow Daily began airing.

== Ratings ==
In March 2014, it was reported that Ronan Farrow Daily suffered from poor ratings after drawing an average of 312,000 total viewers. The Wednesday March 26 show was 708th among all programming ranked by Nielsen for the day. MSNBC announced in February 2015 that it canceled Ronan Farrow Daily after only one season due to low ratings, and its final episode aired on February 27, 2015.
