= Maureen O'Sullivan =

Irish and American actress (1911–1998)

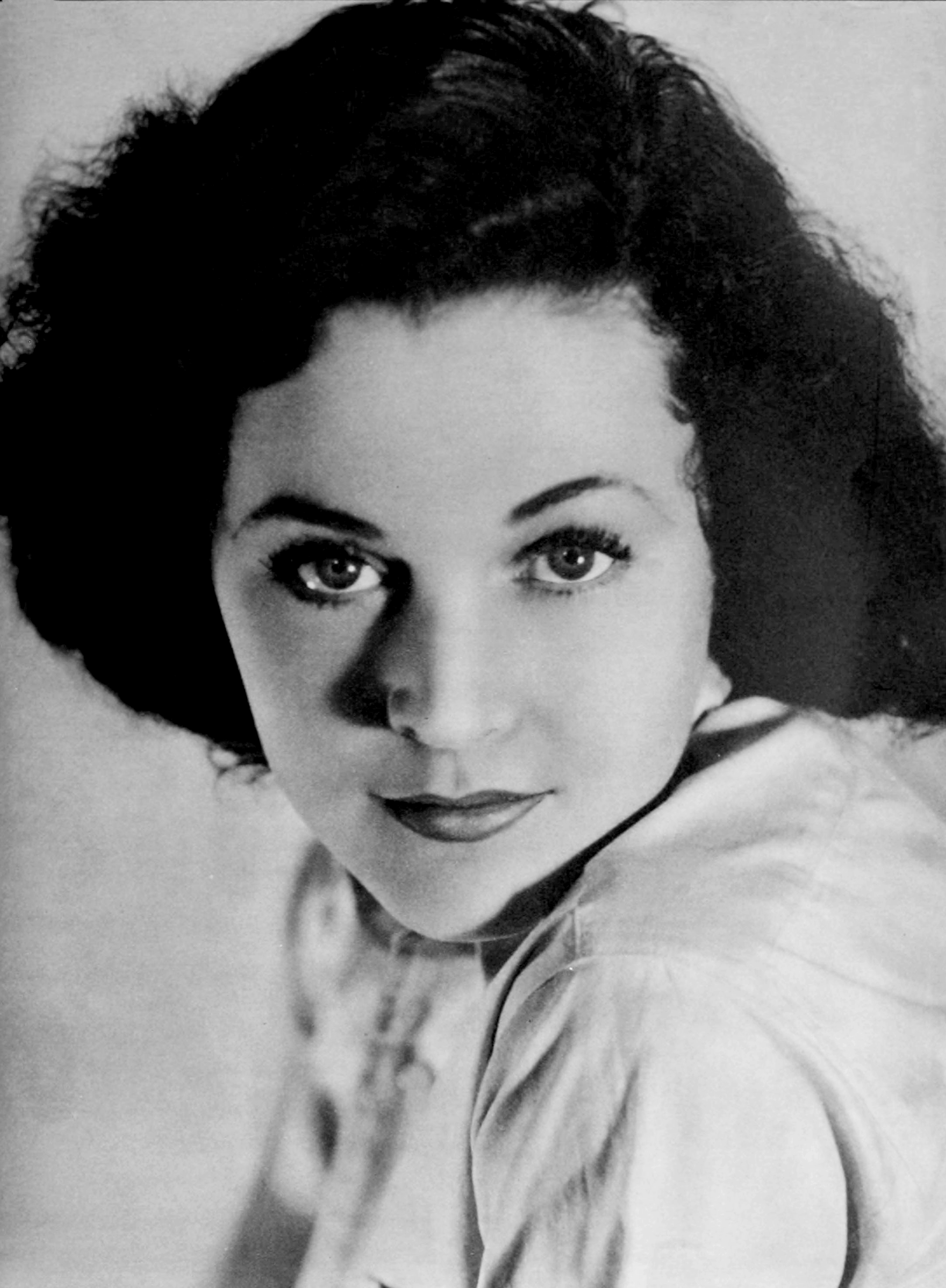
- O'Sullivan in 1934
- Born: Maureen Paula O'Sullivan; May 17, 1911; Boyle, County Roscommon, Ireland
- Died: June 23, 1998 (aged 87); Scottsdale, Arizona, U.S.
- Resting place: Most Holy Redeemer Cemetery, Niskayuna, New York
- Occupations: Actress; singer
- Years active: 1930–1994
- Known for: Jane Parker in Tarzan films
- Spouses: John Farrow (m. 1936; died 1963) James Cushing (m. 1983)
- Children: 7, including Patrick, Mia, Prudence, and Tisa
- Relatives: Ronan Farrow (grandson)

Maureen Paula O'Sullivan (May 17, 1911 – June 23, 1998) was an Irish and American actress. She played Jane in the Tarzan series of films during the era of Johnny Weissmuller. She also starred in dozens of feature films across a span of more than half a century and performed with such stars as Laurence Olivier, Greta Garbo, Fredric March, William Powell, Myrna Loy, Marie Dressler, Wallace Beery, Lionel Barrymore, the Marx Brothers and Woody Allen. In 2020, she was listed at number eight on The Irish Times list of Ireland's greatest film actors.

O'Sullivan was born in Boyle, County Roscommon, Ireland. After attending schools in Dublin, England, and France, she moved to Hollywood to work for Fox Film Corporation. Her film career began in the 1930s, and she eventually became a contract player at Metro-Goldwyn-Mayer. She is best known for playing Jane Parker in six Tarzan films between 1932 and 1942, alongside Johnny Weissmuller. She also appeared in films such as The Thin Man (1934), Anna Karenina (1935), A Day at the Races (1937), Pride and Prejudice (1940), and Maisie Was a Lady (1941). She took a break from acting to care for her family but later returned to the screen in films directed by her husband, John Farrow. She continued to work in film and theatre throughout her life, including appearances in Woody Allen's Hannah and Her Sisters (1986), Francis Ford Coppola's Peggy Sue Got Married (1986), and in Stranded (1987).

O'Sullivan was married twice, first to John Farrow, with whom she had seven children, including actress Mia Farrow, and later to businessman James Cushing. She became a U.S. citizen in 1947 and was a registered Democrat. O'Sullivan died in 1998 at the age of 87. She has a star on the Hollywood Walk of Fame and is remembered for her contributions to the art of film, including receiving the George Eastman Award in 1982.

== Early life ==
O'Sullivan was born in Boyle, County Roscommon, Ireland, on May 17, 1911, one of five children of Mary (née Fraser or Frazer; 1884–1969) and Major Charles Joseph O'Sullivan (1880–1974), an officer in the Connaught Rangers who served in World War I. Maureen O'Sullivan returned to Boyle in 1988 to be honoured by the town.

Raised Catholic, O'Sullivan attended a convent school in Dublin, then the Convent of the Sacred Heart at Roehampton, England (now Woldingham School). One of her school friends there was Vivian Mary Hartley, two years her junior, the future Academy Award-winning actress Vivien Leigh. After attending finishing school in France, O'Sullivan returned to Dublin to work with the poor. In October 1929, she sailed to New York with her mother on the British steamer RMS Baltic, on the way to Hollywood to work for the Fox Film Corporation.

== Film career ==
O'Sullivan's film career began when she met motion picture director Frank Borzage, who was doing location filming on Song o' My Heart (released in 1930) for Fox Film Corporation. He suggested she take a screen test which won her a part in the movie that starred Irish tenor John McCormack. She travelled to the United States to complete the movie in Hollywood. She appeared in six movies at Fox, then made three more at other studios.

In 1932, she signed a contract with Metro-Goldwyn-Mayer. After several roles there and for other studios, she was chosen by Irving Thalberg to appear as Jane Parker in Tarzan the Ape Man, with costar Johnny Weissmuller. One of MGM's more popular ingenues through the 1930s, she appeared in a number of other productions with various stars. She played Jane in six Tarzan features between 1932 and 1942.

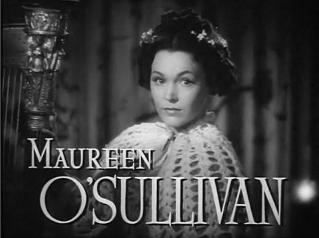
In Pride and Prejudice, 1940

She was featured with William Powell and Myrna Loy in The Thin Man (1934) and played Kitty in Anna Karenina (1935) with Greta Garbo, Fredric March, and Basil Rathbone. After costarring with the Marx Brothers in A Day at the Races (1937), she appeared as Molly Beaumont in A Yank at Oxford (1938), written partly by F. Scott Fitzgerald.

She appeared in Pride and Prejudice (1940) with Laurence Olivier and Greer Garson, and supported Ann Sothern in Maisie Was a Lady (1941). After appearing in Tarzan's New York Adventure (1942), O'Sullivan asked MGM to release her from her contract so she could care for her husband, John Farrow, who had just left the Navy with typhoid. She retreated from show business, devoting her time to her family. In 1948, she reappeared on the screen in The Big Clock, directed by her husband for Paramount Pictures. She continued to appear occasionally in her husband's movies and on television.

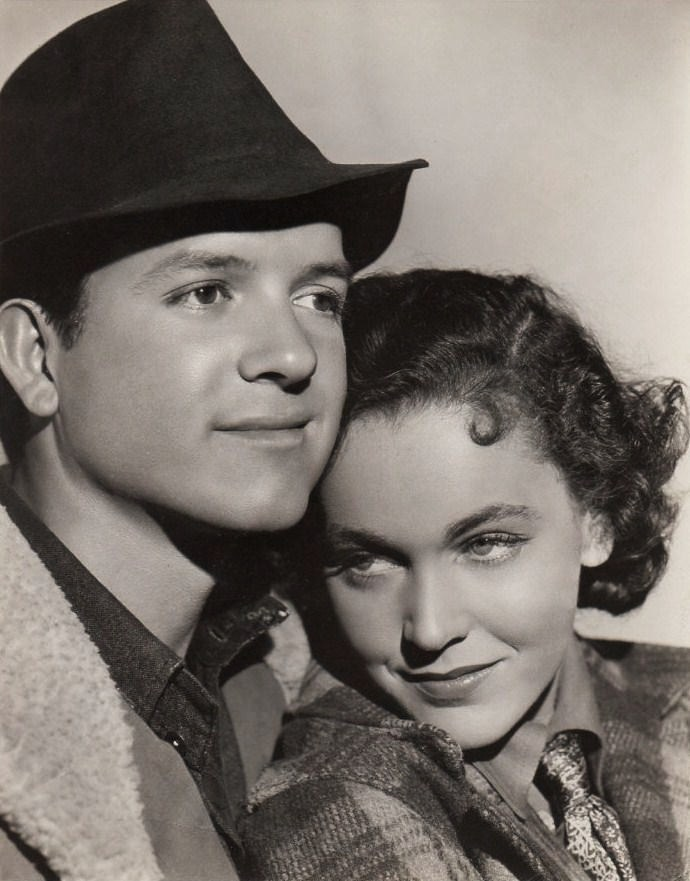
With Eric Linden in The Voice of Bugle Ann (1936)

By 1960, O'Sullivan believed she had permanently retired. However, actor Pat O'Brien encouraged her to take a part in summer stock, and the play A Roomful of Roses opened in 1961. It led to her Broadway debut in Never Too Late with costar Paul Ford. Shortly after it opened, John Farrow died of a heart attack. O'Sullivan stuck with acting after Farrow's death; she was the Today Girl for NBC for a while, then made the movie version of Never Too Late (1965) for Warner Bros. She was also an executive director of a bridal consulting service, Wediquette International.

In June and July 1972, O'Sullivan was in Denver, Colorado, to star in the Elitch Theatre production of Butterflies are Free with Karen Grassle and Brandon deWilde. The show ended on July 1, 1972.

When her daughter, actress Mia Farrow, became involved with Woody Allen both professionally and romantically, she appeared in Allen's Hannah and Her Sisters, playing Farrow's mother. She had roles in Peggy Sue Got Married (1986) and the science fiction oddity Stranded (1987). In 1994, she appeared with Robert Wagner and Stefanie Powers in Hart to Hart: Home Is Where the Hart Is, a feature-length made-for-TV movie with the wealthy husband-and-wife team from the popular weekly detective series Hart to Hart.

== Personal life ==
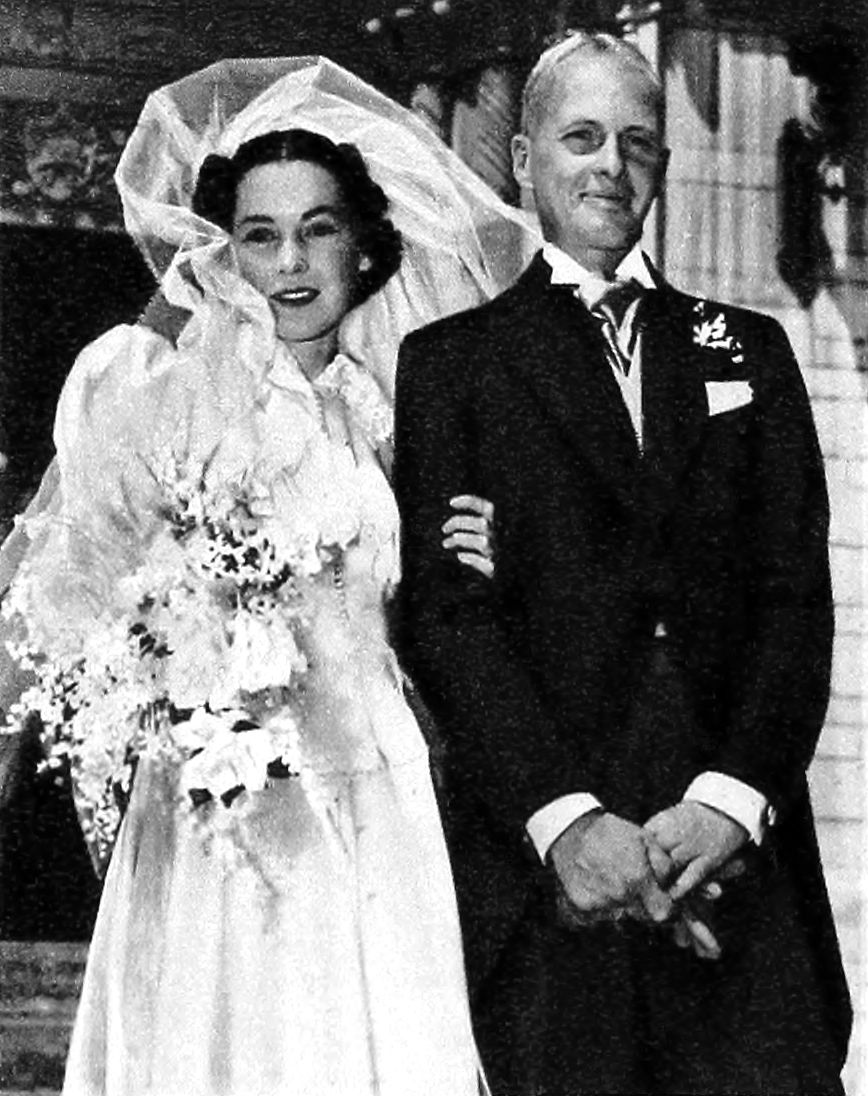
Wedding of Maureen O'Sullivan and John Farrow (1936)

O'Sullivan's first husband was Australian-American writer, award-winning director and Catholic convert John Villiers Farrow, from September 12, 1936, until his death on January 27, 1963. She and Farrow had seven children: Michael Damien, Patrick Joseph (Patrick Villiers Farrow), Maria de Lourdes Villiers (Mia Farrow), John Charles, Prudence Farrow, Stephanie Farrow and Theresa Magdalena "Tisa" Farrow. Mia Farrow gave two of her children, Dylan and Ronan, the middle name of O'Sullivan.

In 1958, Michael Farrow, eldest son of John Farrow and Maureen O'Sullivan, died in a plane crash in California.

Twenty years after the death of Farrow, O'Sullivan married James Cushing, a wealthy businessman, on August 22, 1983, and they remained wed until her death in 1998. O'Sullivan became a U.S. citizen on October 22, 1947 (Petition for Naturalization #133033) in Los Angeles, California.

O'Sullivan was a Catholic.

== Death ==
O'Sullivan died in Scottsdale, Arizona, of complications from heart surgery, on June 23, 1998, at age 87.

== Legacy ==
O'Sullivan has a star on the Hollywood Walk of Fame at 6541 Hollywood Boulevard, facing the star of Johnny Weissmuller. A black plaque marks her home on Main Street in Boyle, County Roscommon, Ireland. Just around the corner from there, opposite King House, is a tree, ceremonially planted by O'Sullivan to mark her return to her birthplace.

In 1982, O'Sullivan received the George Eastman Award, given by George Eastman House for distinguished contribution to the art of film.

== Filmography ==
Feature films

Year	Title	Role
1930	So This Is London	Elinor Worthing
1930	Song o' My Heart	Eileen
1930	Just Imagine	LN-18
1930	The Princess and the Plumber	Princess Louise
1931	A Connecticut Yankee	Alisande / Woman in Mansion
1931	Skyline	Kathleen Kearny
1931	The Big Shot	Doris Thompson
1932
1932	Tarzan the Ape Man	Jane Parker
1932	The Silver Lining	Joyce Moore
1932	Fast Companions	Sally
1932	Strange Interlude	Madeline
1932	Skyscraper Souls	Lynn Harding
1932	Okay, America!	Sheila Barton
1932	Payment Deferred	Winnie Marble
1932	Robbers' Roost	Helen Herrick
1933	The Cohens and Kellys in Trouble	Molly Kelly
1933	Tugboat Annie	Patricia 'Pat' Severn
1933	Stage Mother	Shirley Lorraine
1934	Tarzan and His Mate	Jane Parker
1934	The Thin Man	Dorothy Wynant
1934	Hide-Out	Pauline Miller
1934	The Barretts of Wimpole Street	Henrietta Barrett
1935	David Copperfield	Dora
1935	West Point of the Air	'Skip' Carter
1935	Cardinal Richelieu	Lenore di Brissac
1935	The Flame Within	Linda Belton
1935	Woman Wanted	Ann Gray
1935	Anna Karenina	Kitty
1935	The Bishop Misbehaves	Hester
1936	The Voice of Bugle Ann	Camden Terry
1936	The Devil-Doll	Lorraine Lavond
1936	Tarzan Escapes	Jane Parker
1937	A Day at the Races	Judy Standish
1937	The Emperor's Candlesticks	Maria Orlich
1937	Between Two Women	Claire Donahue
1937	My Dear Miss Aldrich	Martha Aldrich
1938	A Yank at Oxford	Molly Beaumont
1938	Hold That Kiss	June Evans
1938	Port of Seven Seas	Madelon
1938	The Crowd Roars	Sheila Carson
1938	Spring Madness	Alexandra Benson
1939	Let Us Live	Mary Roberts
1939	Tarzan Finds a Son!	Jane Parker
1940	Sporting Blood	Linda Lockwood
1940	Pride and Prejudice	Jane Bennet
1941	Maisie Was a Lady	Abby Rawlston
1941	Tarzan's Secret Treasure	Jane Parker
1942	Tarzan's New York Adventure	Jane Parker
1948	The Big Clock	Georgette Stroud
1950	Where Danger Lives	Julie
1951	No Resting Place	Nan Kyle
1952	Bonzo Goes to College	Marion Gateson Drew
1953	All I Desire	Sara Harper
1953	Mission Over Korea	Nancy Slocum
1954	Duffy of San Quentin	Gladys Duffy
1954	The Steel Cage	Gladys Duffy
1957	The Tall T	Doretta Mims
1958	Wild Heritage	Emma Breslin
1965	Never Too Late	Edith Lambert
1970	The Phynx	Maureen O'Sullivan
1985	Too Scared to Scream	Inez Hardwick
1986	Hannah and Her Sisters	Norma
1986	Peggy Sue Got Married	Elizabeth Alvorg
1987	Stranded	Grace Clark
1988	Good Old Boy: A Delta Boyhood	Aunt Sue

Short subjects

- Hollywood Extra: The First Step (1936) as Herself
- Hollywood – The Second Step (1936)
- Unusual Occupations: Film Tot Holiday (1947)
- Screen Snapshots: Hollywood Shower of Stars (1955)
- Mandy's Grandmother (1978) as Grandmother

== Television work ==
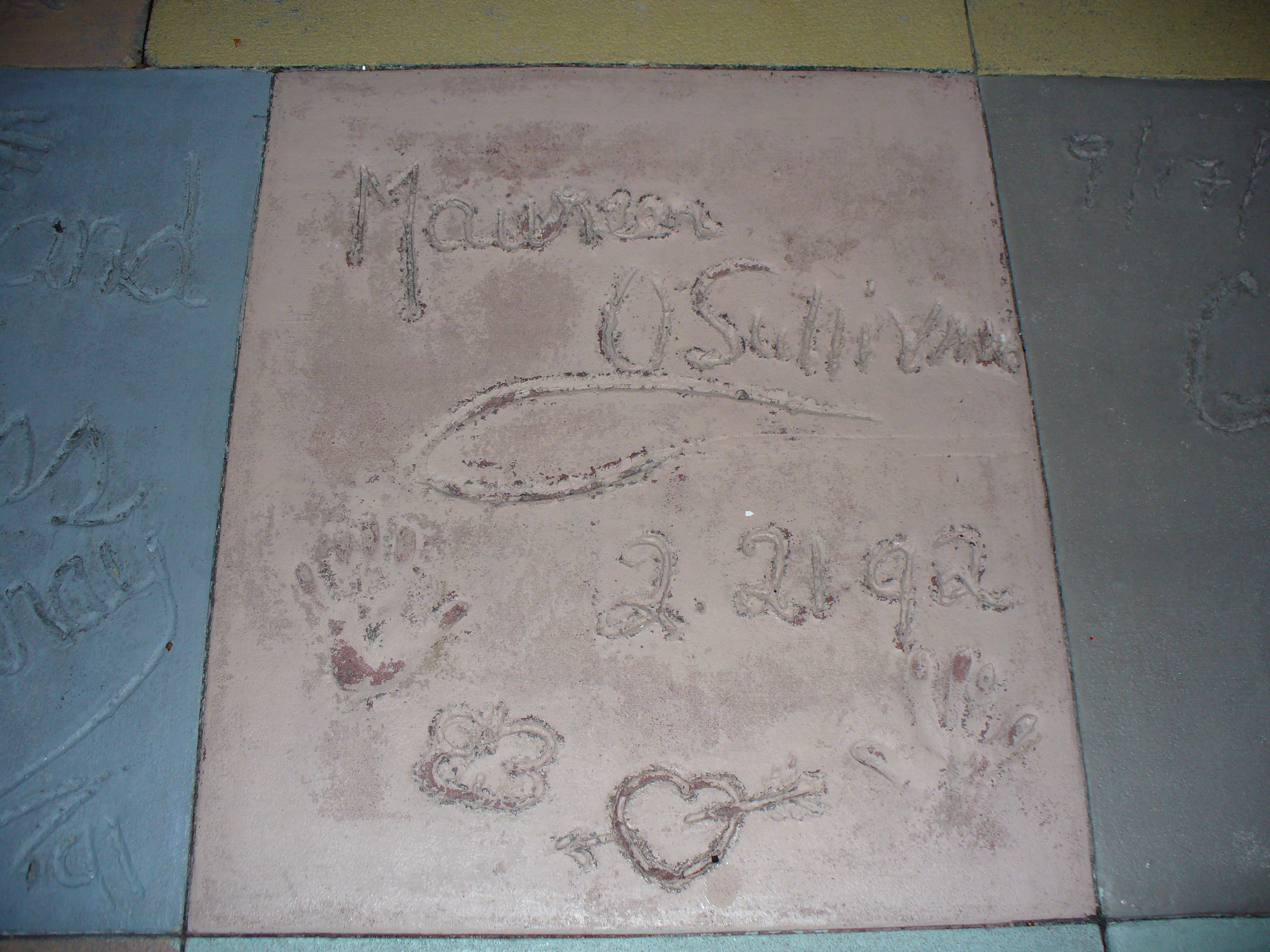
The handprints of Maureen O'Sullivan in front of The Great Movie Ride at Walt Disney World's Disney's Hollywood Studios theme park

Year	Title	Role	Notes
1953	Jukebox Jury		
1957	Crossroads	Mrs. Day	Episode: "The Man Who Walked on Water"
1957	Playhouse 90	Julia Williams	Episode: "The Edge of Innocence "
1963	Candid Camera	Self	Episode: "19 May 1963"
1965	What's My Line?	Contestant	Episode: "14 November 1965"
1972	The Crooked Hearts	Lillian Stanton	TV movie
1976	The Great Houdini	Lady Conan Doyle	TV movie
1982	Morning's at Seven	Esther Crampton	TV movie
1983	All My Children	Olive Whelan	
1984	Guiding Light	Miss Emma Witherspoon	
1985	Search for Tomorrow	Elaine Descot	
1992	With Murder in Mind	Aunt Mildred	TV movie
1992	The Habitation of Dragons	Helen Taylor	TV movie
1994	Hart to Hart: Home Is Where the Hart Is	Eleanor Biddlecomb	Final film role

== Radio appearances ==
Year	Program	Episode/source
1941	Philip Morris Playhouse	Night Must Fall
1944	Suspense	The Black Shawl
