= John Farrow =

Australian-American film director (1904–1963)

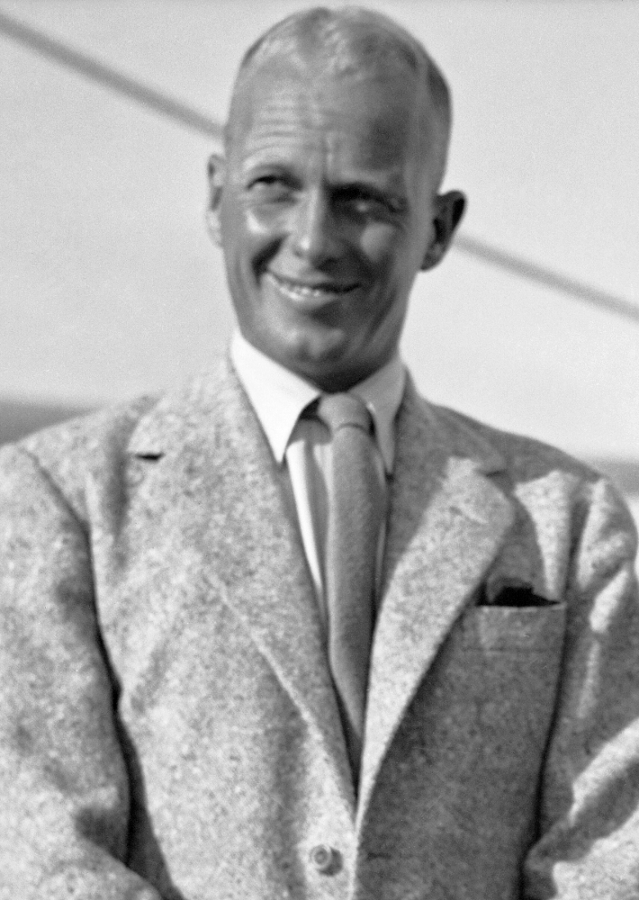
- Farrow in 1934
- Born: John Villiers Farrow; 10 February 1904; Sydney, New South Wales, Australia
- Died: 27 January 1963 (aged 58); Beverly Hills, California, US
- Resting place: Holy Cross Cemetery, Culver City
- Occupations: Director; producer; screenwriter
- Years active: 1927–1962
- Spouses: Felice Lewin (m. 1924; div. 1927) Maureen O'Sullivan (m. 1936)
- Partner: Lila Lee (1928–1933)
- Children: 8, including Patrick, Mia, Prudence, and Tisa
- Relatives: Ronan Farrow (grandson)

John Villiers Farrow, KGCHS (10 February 1904 – 27 January 1963) was an Australian-American film director, producer, and screenwriter. He spent a considerable amount of his five-decade career in the United States and was nominated for the Academy Award for Best Director in 1942 for Wake Island. In 1957, Farrow won the Academy Award for Best Adapted Screenplay for Around the World in Eighty Days. He had seven children by his wife, actress Maureen O'Sullivan, including actress Mia Farrow.

== Early life ==
Farrow was born in Marrickville, a suburb of Sydney, Australia, the son of Lucy Villiers (née Savage; 1881–1907), a dressmaker, and Joseph Farrow (1880–1925), a tailor's trimmer. His parents were both of English descent. Farrow was educated at Newtown Public School and Fort Street Boys' High School, and then started a career in accountancy.

He claimed to have run away to sea in an American barquentine, sailed "all over the Pacific", and fought in revolts in Nicaragua and Mexico. Reaching California, he enrolled at St. Ignatius College (later known as the University of San Francisco) in 1923, but left after one month.

He travelled throughout the Pacific, including Fiji, Hawaii, and Guam. On arrival in Hollywood, Farrow fabricated his education, saying he had attended Newington College in Sydney, Australia (he lived in a street below its ovals), Winchester College in England, and the US Naval Academy in Annapolis, Maryland. Many publications and websites still contain this misinformation.

== Writer ==
Farrow started writing while working as a sailor, and became interested in screenwriting after a chance voyage in the South Seas with the filmmaker Robert J. Flaherty. Re-entering the United States, allegedly by jumping ship at San Francisco, he found his way to Hollywood, where from 1927, his nautical expertise brought him work as a script consultant and technical adviser. He had already earned minor recognition as a poet and writer of short stories. Some of his stories were sold to Hollywood.

He soon established himself as a notable screenwriter. He worked for DeMille Productions, doing titles for White Gold (1927) (his first credit) and The Wreck of the Hesperus (1927).

He adapted Richard Connell's 1923 short story "A Friend of Napoleon", but it does not appear to have been made. He also wrote the original story for The Blue Danube and the script for The Bride of the Colorado, both of which were released in 1928. At Warner Bros., he wrote A Sailor's Sweetheart (1927) for director Lloyd Bacon.

Farrow wrote the screenplays for Three Weekends, The Woman from Moscow, The First Kiss, Ladies of the Mob, The Showdown, The Four Feathers, The Wheel of Life, A Dangerous Woman, Wolf Song, The Bad One, Shadow of the Law and Seven Days' Leave.

=== Britain ===
Farrow wrote an English-French-Tahitian dictionary, as well as a novel, Laughter Ends (1934). In 1932, he went to England, where he wrote The Impassive Footman (1932) for Basil Dean. He worked as a writer and assistant director on G. W. Pabst's film Don Quixote (1933), and briefly visited Tahiti again.

=== Return to Hollywood and arrest ===
Farrow returned to Hollywood and re-established himself as a screenwriter. On 27 January 1933, while dancing at the Cocoanut Grove nightclub, he was arrested for breach of his visa, as part of a general crackdown against illegal immigrants in the film industry. Farrow was charged with making a false statement while entering the US, having claimed he was Romanian. Although threatened with deportation, eventually he was given five years' probation, before being acquitted of the charges the following year.

At MGM, Farrow wrote Last of the Pagans (1935), partly set in Tahiti, and directed a short, "The Spectacle Maker" (1934). He received a plum appointment to work on Tarzan Escapes (1936), but the film was subsequently rewritten and reshot.

== Film director ==
=== Warner Bros. ===
In 1930, Farrow was announced as directing his own story, First Love, but this did not materialise. He signed to Warner Bros. in 1936, looking to direct, and was linked with a number of projects, including a Foreign Legion story and an adaptation of Edgar Allan Poe's 1842 short story "The Pit and the Pendulum". Farrow finally made his directorial debut in 1937 with Men in Exile, a remake of Safe in Hell (1931).

Following this, he accompanied his wife, Maureen O'Sullivan, to Europe, where she was making A Yank at Oxford (1938), lectured on Father Damien, about whom Farrow had written a book (published in 1937), and received a papal knighthood.

On his return to Hollywood, Farrow resumed working as a B-picture director for Warner Bros., with West of Shanghai (1937) with Boris Karloff and She Loved a Fireman (1937) with Dick Foran and Ann Sheridan. He was reunited with Karloff in The Invisible Menace (1938), then made Little Miss Thoroughbred (1938) with John Litel and Sheridan, the first film for Peggy Ann Garner.

Farrow left his contract for a number of months, ostensibly to finish a book he was writing on the history of the papacy, and also due to disputes over the script for his next film, another starring Kay Francis, Women in the Wind (1939).

=== RKO ===
Farrow re-emerged as a contract director for RKO, directing the highly profitable The Saint Strikes Back (1939), the second in the "Saint" series and the first to star George Sanders in the lead. He followed it with Sorority House (1939), from a script by Dalton Trumbo and produced by Robert Sisk. RKO then announced Farrow would direct a film version of the director's book Damien the Leper produced by Sisk and starring Joseph Calleia, but it was never made.

"I deliberately set out to become the damnedest commercial director in the business", he said later. "The only way to get anywhere in Hollywood is to make money pictures. Then, you can get some measure of respect and authority from the studio bosses, and little by little you get to do more of the things you want to do."

=== War service ===
Despite his flourishing career and recently having become a father for the first time, Farrow was keen to be involved in World War II. He went to Vancouver in November 1939 and enlisted in the Royal Canadian Navy. He went back to RKO to finish Bill of Divorcement, then joined the navy. RKO promised to hold his job when he returned.

Farrow was appointed lieutenant in March 1940, and was assigned to Naval History and the Controller of Information unit. He worked on antisubmarine patrols, and in April 1941, was lent to the Royal Navy and appointed to HMS Goshawk naval base in Trinidad, and served as assistant to the Senior British Naval Officer, Curaçao. He contracted typhus fever and returned to Naval Headquarters, Ottawa, in late 1941.

He was to direct a Canadian war film starring his wife, Maureen O'Sullivan, while on leave, but this did not happen.

Farrow was invalided out of the Royal Canadian Navy with typhus in January 1942 at the rank of commander, but remained in the naval reserve. He was gravely ill when he returned, but was nursed back to health by his wife. His illness meant he was unable to return to active service.

=== Paramount ===
Farrow resumed his directing career at Paramount, whose head of production, Buddy de Sylva, had been impressed by Five Came Back and offered Farrow a contract. For the first time, Farrow was directing nothing but A movies. The association began brilliantly with Wake Island (1942), which earned him an Oscar nomination for Best Director, and was one of the year's biggest hits.

Farrow followed it with another war film shot in Canada for Columbia, Commandos Strike at Dawn (1942), which also proved popular. China (1943), with Alan Ladd and Loretta Young, was another big hit.

In February 1943, Farrow signed a long-term contract with Paramount. In July 1943, he served as technical consultant for the proposed Royal Canadian Navy show. He directed The Hitler Gang (1944), Two Years Before the Mast (filmed 1944, not released until 1946) with Ladd, and You Came Along (1945), from a script co-written by Ayn Rand.

In May 1945, Farrow was briefly recalled to active duty, travelling to Britain for work in connection with the director of special services. Shortly after, he made Calcutta (1947) with Ladd, though it was not released until two years later, to strong box-office receipts.

Two Years Before the Mast, released in 1946, became the tenth-most popular movie of the year. In 1946, Farrow was reportedly writing a biography of Junípero Serra, but it appears to have never been made.

Farrow became an American citizen in July 1947.

=== Film noir and westerns ===
In 1947, Farrow made one of his most highly regarded films, the noir The Big Clock (1948) with Ray Milland and O'Sullivan. He was reunited with Ladd for a military drama, Beyond Glory (1948), then returned to noir with Night Has a Thousand Eyes (1948), starring Edward G. Robinson from a Cornell Woolrich novel, and Alias Nick Beal (1949), with Milland.

Back at Paramount, he made Submarine Command (1951) with William Holden. He wound up his contract with a final movie with Ladd, Botany Bay (1952), a half-successful attempt to repeat Two Years Before the Mast. It was one of his few movies to have a connection to his native Australia.

=== Freelancer ===
Farrow directed Robert Taylor and Ava Gardner in the MGM Western, Ride, Vaquero! (1953), which was a hit. He made two produced by John Wayne for Wayne's company, Batjac: Plunder of the Sun (1953), an adventure story with Glenn Ford, and Hondo (1953) with Wayne, from a story by Louis L'Amour; the latter especially was popular at the box office.

Farrow was the original director of Around the World in 80 Days (1956), but was fired by producer Michael Todd shortly after filming commenced, but Farrow remained credited for his contribution to the screenplay, which won an Oscar in 1956.

=== RKO ===
Farrow signed a three-picture deal with RKO. He only made two of them, neither successful: Back from Eternity (1956), a remake of Five Came Back, and The Unholy Wife (1957), a failed attempt to launch Diana Dors to US audiences.

== Personal life ==
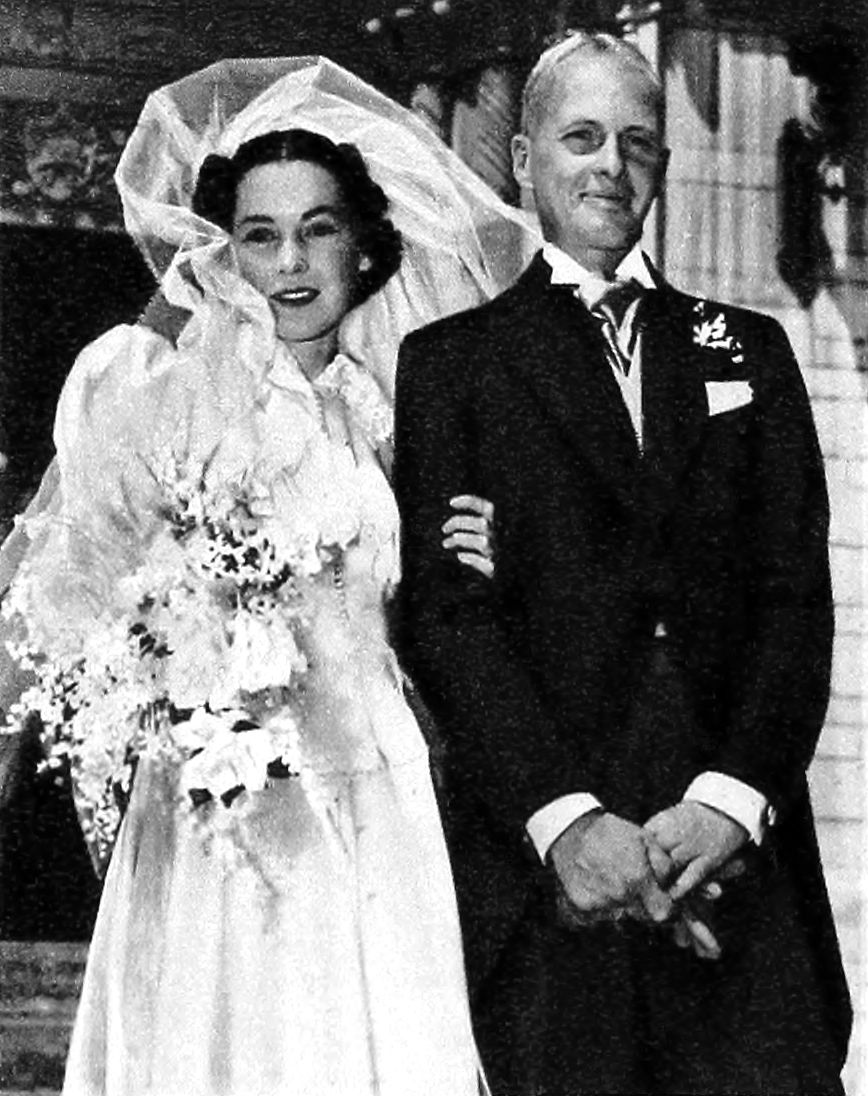
Wedding of John Farrow and Maureen O'Sullivan in 1936

Farrow was a notorious playboy in his youth, being linked to Dolores del Río and Diana Churchill among others. He married Felice Lewin on 18 August 1924. They had one daughter, Felice Patricia Farrow (1925–1997). The marriage ended in divorce in September 1927. Farrow began a relationship with Lila Lee in 1928, and they became engaged. However, they never married and their relationship ended in 1933 after Lee discovered Farrow was being unfaithful to her.

In 1934, he became engaged to actress Maureen O'Sullivan and they married on 12 September 1936, after he converted to Catholicism and received an annulment of his first marriage. Farrow and O'Sullivan had seven children: four daughters, who became actresses, Mia (born 1945), Prudence (born 1948), Stephanie (born 1949), Tisa (1951-2024); and three sons, Michael Damien (1939–1958), Patrick Villiers (1942–2009), and John Charles (born 1946).

Farrow often wrote about Catholic themes. He would later deny he was a convert to Catholicism. He claimed that he had been baptised as an infant by his Irish nurse. He was not raised Catholic, and did not learn of his infant baptism until after his 1929 adult baptism.

Death

John Farrow died of a heart attack in Beverly Hills, California on 27 January 1963 at the age of 58, and was buried in the Holy Cross Cemetery, Culver City.

== Awards and honours ==
- Knight Grand Cross of the Order of the Holy Sepulchre by Pope Pius XI in 1937
- Oscar nomination and New York Film Critics Circle Award for directing Wake Island (1942)
- Order of St John of Jerusalem 1951
- Honorary Commander of the Order of the British Empire (CBE) in 1953.
- Oscar and Writers Guild of America Award for his adapted screenplay for Around the World in Eighty Days (1956)
- His star on the Hollywood Walk of Fame is located at 6304 Hollywood Blvd.

== Australian connection ==
As one of the few high-profile Australians in Hollywood during the 1930s, Farrow's activities were well covered by the Australian media. He accepted the Oscar won by the Australian documentary Kokoda Front Line! (1943), met Australian Senator Richard Keane, the Minister for Trade and Customs, when he visited Hollywood during the war and offered to assist in the establishment of the Australian Information Service in the US. He also often expressed a desire to make a film back in Australia and later made two films with Australian connections, Botany Bay (1953) and The Sea Chase (1955), despite having ceased to be a British subject in 1947, thus never acquiring Australian citizenship when it was created in 1949.

In 1927, he was described as an Australian member of Hollywood, along with May Robson, New Zealander Rupert Julian, Josephine Norman, and director E. O. Gurney.

== Filmography ==
=== Writer only ===
- White Gold (1927) – titles
- The Wreck of the Hesperus (1927) – story
- A Sailor's Sweetheart (1927)
- Three Weekends (1928)
- The Woman From Moscow (1928)
- The First Kiss (1928)
- Ladies of the Mob (1928)
- The Blue Danube (1928) – story
- The Showdown (1928) – titles
- Three Weekends (1928)
- The Bride of the Colorado (1928) – story
- The Four Feathers (1929) – titles
- The Wheel of Life (1929) – adaptation
- A Dangerous Woman (1929)
- Wolf Song (1929)
- Inside the Lines (1930) – dialogue
- Shadow of the Law (1930)
- The Bad One (1930) – story
- Seven Days' Leave (1930) – continuity and dialogue
- The Common Law (1931)
- A Woman of Experience (1931) – dialogue & screenplay, based on his play A Registered Woman
- The Impassive Footman (1932)
- Adventures of Don Quixote (1933) – w (English version)
- Mutiny on the Bounty (1935) (uncredited)
- Last of the Pagans (1935) – original story
- Around the World in 80 Days (1956)

=== Director ===
- The Spectacle Maker (1934) – also writer
- Tarzan Escapes (1936) (uncredited) – also writer
- Men in Exile (1937)
- She Loved a Fireman (1937)
- West of Shanghai (1937)
- Comet Over Broadway (1938) (uncredited)
- Broadway Musketeers (1938)
- My Bill (1938)
- Little Miss Thoroughbred (1938)
- The Invisible Menace (1938)
- Reno (1939)
- Full Confession (1939)
- Five Came Back (1939)
- Sorority House (1939)
- Women in the Wind (1939)
- The Saint Strikes Back (1939)
- A Bill of Divorcement (1940)
- Married and in Love (1940)
- Commandos Strike at Dawn (1942) – British Naval Officer (uncredited)
- Wake Island (1942)
- China (1943)
- The Hitler Gang (1944)
- You Came Along (1945)
- Two Years Before the Mast (1946)
- California (1947)
- Blaze of Noon (1947)
- Calcutta (1947)
- Easy Come, Easy Go (1947)
- Night Has a Thousand Eyes (1948)
- Beyond Glory (1948)
- The Big Clock (1948) – also producer
- Red, Hot and Blue (1949) – also writer
- Alias Nick Beal (1949)
- Copper Canyon (1950)
- Where Danger Lives (1950)
- Red Mountain (1951) – uncredited assistance
- Submarine Command (1951) – also producer
- His Kind of Woman (1951)
- Hondo (1953)
- Plunder of the Sun (1953)
- Ride, Vaquero! (1953)
- Botany Bay (1953)
- King of the Khyber Rifles (1953) – Englishman (uncredited)
- A Bullet Is Waiting (1954)
- The Sea Chase (1955) – also producer
- The Shrike (1955) – Englishman (uncredited)
- Back from Eternity (1956) – also producer
- The Unholy Wife (1957) – also writer, producer
- John Paul Jones (1959) – also writer

=== Screenplays for unrealised films ===
- A Friend of Napoleon (1927) – adapted from story by Richard Connell for director William K. Howard and produced by Cecil B. DeMille
- Father Damien (1939), adapted from Farrow's book Damien the Leper (1937)

== Books ==
- The Bad One (1930) – novel
- Laughter Ends (1933) – novel
- Damien the Leper (1937) – biography of Father Damien
- The Royal Canadian Navy 1908–1940 (1940) – history
- Pageant of the Popes (1950) – history of the papacy
- Seven Poems in Pattern (1955) – collection of poetry
- The Story of Sir Thomas More (1956) – biography of Thomas More

== Play ==
- A Registered Woman (1931)
