= Ronan Farrow =

American journalist (born 1987)

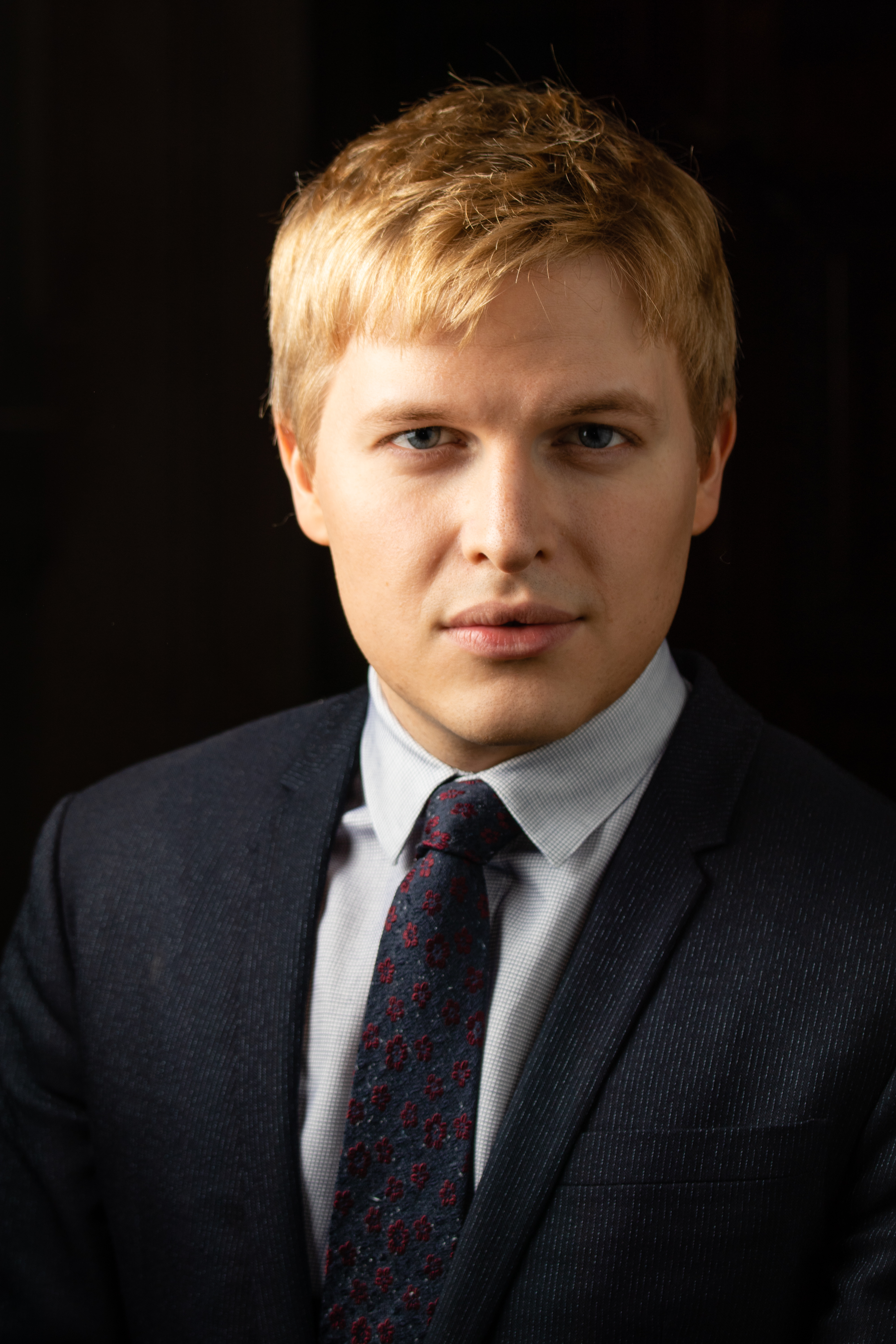
- Farrow in 2018
- Born: Satchel Ronan O'Sullivan Farrow; December 19, 1987 (age 38); New York City, U.S.
- Other name: Seamus Farrow
- Citizenship: United States; Ireland (Note: Although born in the United States, Farrow also holds Irish citizenship and lived in the country for a short time. "Irish-American journalist who broke Weinstein scandal experienced 'threats and intimidation'". Irish Independent. May 16, 2018.)
- Education: Bard College (BA); Yale University (JD); Magdalen College, Oxford (DPhil)
- Occupation: Journalist
- Years active: 2001–present
- Partner: Jon Lovett (2011–2022)
- Parents: Mia Farrow; Woody Allen
- Relatives: John Farrow (grandfather); Maureen O'Sullivan (grandmother); Patrick Villiers Farrow (uncle); Prudence Farrow (aunt); Tisa Farrow (aunt); Letty Aronson (aunt); Soon-Yi Previn (adoptive half-sister/stepmother); Moses Farrow (adoptive brother)

Satchel Ronan O'Sullivan Farrow (born December 19, 1987) is an American journalist and lawyer. He is known for his investigative reporting on sexual abuse allegations against film producer Harvey Weinstein, which was published in The New Yorker magazine. The magazine won the 2018 Pulitzer Prize for Public Service for this reporting, sharing the award with The New York Times. Farrow has worked for UNICEF and as a government advisor.

== Early life and education ==
Farrow was born in Manhattan, New York, to actress Mia Farrow and filmmaker Woody Allen. His mother's family is Catholic, and his father is Jewish. His given names honor National Baseball Hall of Fame pitcher Satchel Paige. His maternal name is from his grandmother, Irish-American actress Maureen O'Sullivan. He has 13 siblings, three of whom are deceased, all the product of adoption or his mother's prior marriage to composer André Previn.

=== Relationship with Woody Allen and paternity ===
Farrow is the only biological child born during Mia Farrow's and Allen's relationship. He has been estranged from his father, Woody Allen, since Allen's marriage to Soon-Yi Previn, the adopted daughter of Mia Farrow and André Previn. Farrow commented, "He's my father married to my sister. That makes me his son and his brother-in-law. That is such a moral transgression."

In a 2013 interview with Vanity Fair, Mia Farrow responded to rumors stating that her son could "possibly" be the biological child of singer Frank Sinatra, with whom she said she had "never really split up." Sinatra's daughter Nancy Sinatra was quoted in the same piece, responding to the question of whether Farrow was treated as a member of their family with "He is a big part of us, and we are blessed to have him in our lives." In a 2015 CBS Sunday Morning interview, however, Nancy dismissed the suggestion that Sinatra was Farrow's biological father, and claimed Mia had been joking when affirming the possibility of his parentage. His other daughter Tina claimed her father had a vasectomy years before Farrow's birth. Sinatra's biographer James Kaplan also disputes Sinatra's potential paternity of Farrow in his book Sinatra: The Chairman (2015). He said that Sinatra was splitting his time between Hawaii and Palm Springs with his wife Barbara Marx Sinatra and was in ill health during the time when Farrow would have been conceived.

Farrow has refused to discuss DNA analysis. He has said that, despite their estrangement, "Woody Allen, legally, ethically, personally was absolutely a father in our family." In a 2018 New York magazine article, Allen said that Farrow may not be his biological son: "In my opinion, he's my child ... I think he is, but I wouldn't bet my life on it. I paid for child support for him for his whole childhood, and I don't think that's very fair if he's not mine."

=== Education ===
As a child, Farrow skipped grades in school and took courses with the Center for Talented Youth at Johns Hopkins University. At age 11, he began his studies at Bard College at Simon's Rock, later transferring to Bard College for a Bachelor of Arts in philosophy. Farrow graduated at age 15, becoming the youngest graduate of the institution.

He entered Yale Law School, from which he received a Juris Doctor in 2009. He then passed the New York State Bar examination. Selected as a Rhodes Scholar, Farrow earned a Doctor of Philosophy in political science from the University of Oxford, where he was a student of Magdalen College. His dissertation was entitled "Shadow armies: political representation and strategic reality in America's proxy wars" and was supervised by Desmond King.

== Career ==
=== Public service ===
From 2001 to 2009, Farrow served as a UNICEF Spokesperson for Youth, advocating for children and women caught up in the ongoing crisis in Sudan's Darfur region and assisting in fundraising and addressing United Nations affiliated groups in the United States. During this time, he also made joint trips to the Darfur region of Sudan with his mother, who is a UNICEF Goodwill Ambassador. He subsequently advocated for the protection of Darfuri refugees. Following his time in Sudan, Farrow was affiliated with the Genocide Intervention Network.

During his studies at Yale Law School, Farrow interned at the law firm Davis Polk & Wardwell and in the office of the chief counsel at the United States House Committee on Foreign Affairs, focusing on international human rights law.

In 2009, Farrow joined the Obama administration, as Special Adviser for Humanitarian and NGO Affairs in the Office of the Special Representative for Afghanistan and Pakistan. He was part of a team recruited by diplomat Richard Holbrooke, for whom Farrow had previously worked as a speechwriter. For the next two years, Farrow was responsible for "overseeing the U.S. Government's relationships with civil society and nongovernmental actors" in Afghanistan and Pakistan.

In 2011, Farrow was appointed by Secretary of State Hillary Clinton as her Special Adviser for Global Youth Issues and Director of the State Department's Office of Global Youth Issues. The office was created as a result of a multi-year task-force appointed by Clinton to review the United States' economic and social policies on youth. Farrow co-chaired the working group with senior United States Agency for International Development staff member David Barth beginning in 2010. Farrow's appointment and the creation of the office were announced by Clinton as part of a refocusing on youth following the Arab Spring revolutions. Farrow was responsible for U.S. youth policy and programming with an aim toward "empower[ing] young people as economic and civic actors." Farrow concluded his term as Special Adviser in 2012, with his policies and programs continuing under his successor.

=== Journalism ===
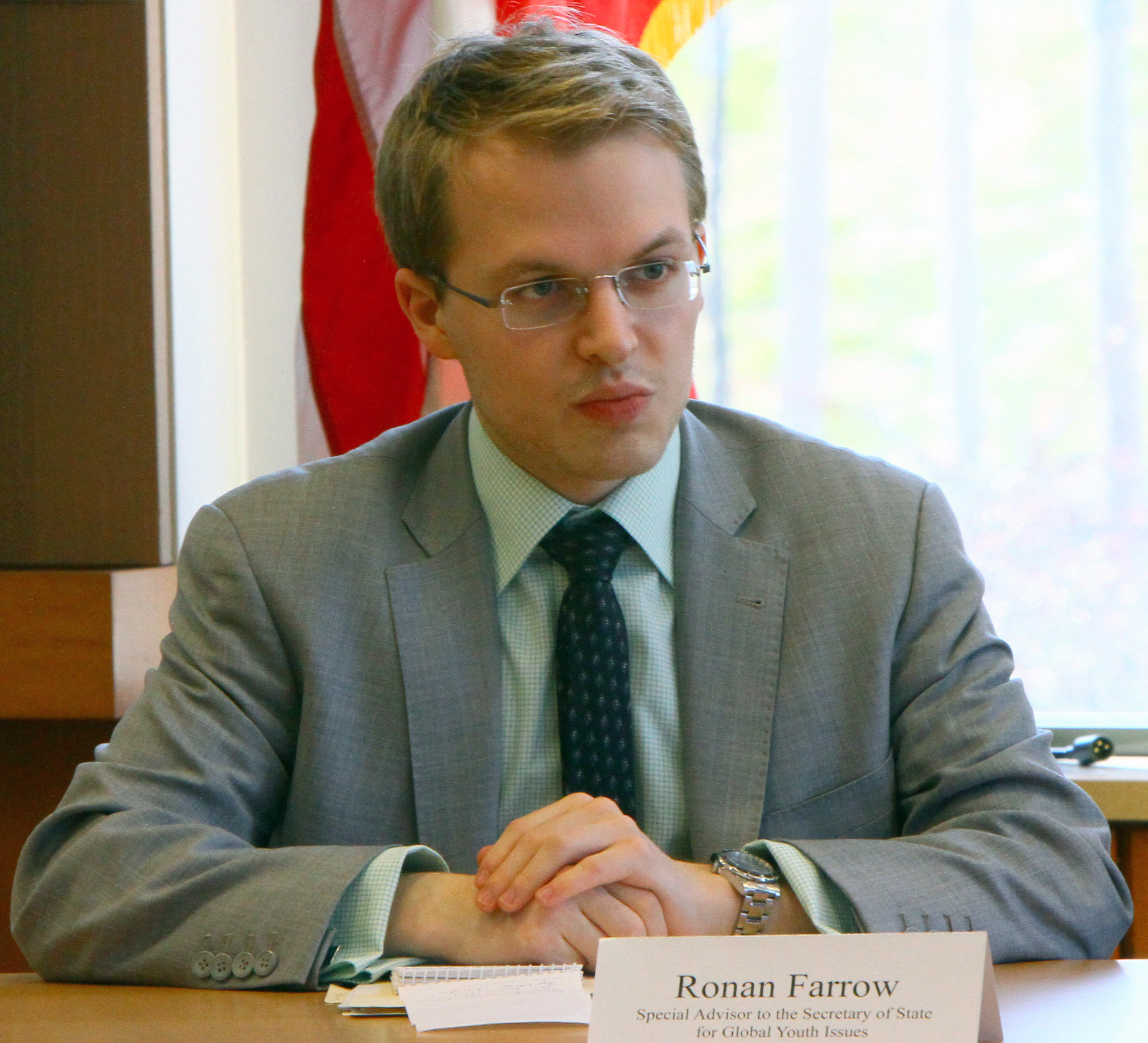
Farrow in 2012

After leaving government, Farrow began a Rhodes Scholarship at Magdalen College, Oxford. He studied toward a DPhil, researching the exploitation of the poor in developing countries, and submitted his thesis in October 2018.

He has written essays, op-eds, and other pieces for The Guardian, Foreign Policy magazine, The Atlantic, The Wall Street Journal, the Los Angeles Times and other periodicals. In October 2013, Penguin Press acquired Farrow's book, Pandora's Box: How American Military Aid Creates America's Enemies, scheduling it for 2015 publication.

From February 2014 through February 2015, Farrow hosted Ronan Farrow Daily, a television news program that aired on MSNBC.

Farrow hosted the investigative segment "Undercover with Ronan Farrow" on NBC's Today. Launched in June 2015, the series was billed as providing Farrow's look at the stories "you don't see in the headlines every day", often featuring crowd-sourced story selection and covering topics from the labor rights of nail salon workers to mental healthcare issues to sexual assault on campus.

On May 11, 2016, The Hollywood Reporter published a guest column by Farrow in which he drew comparisons between the long-term absence of journalistic inquiry into the rape allegations leveled against Bill Cosby and the sexual abuse allegations levied against his father Woody Allen by Farrow's sister Dylan Farrow (who was 7 years old at the time of the alleged abuse). Farrow detailed first-hand accounts of journalists, biographers, and major publications purposefully omitting from their work decades of rape allegations targeting Cosby. Similarly, Farrow recounts the efforts of Allen's publicist, Leslee Dart, to mount a media campaign focused on countering Dylan Farrow's allegations, while at the same time vindicating Allen:

Every day, colleagues at news organizations forwarded me the e‑mails blasted out by Allen's powerful publicist, who had years earlier orchestrated a robust publicity campaign to validate my father's sexual relationship with another one of my siblings. Those e‑mails featured talking points ready-made to be converted into stories, complete with validators on offer—therapists, lawyers, friends, anyone willing to label a young woman confronting a powerful man as crazy, coached, vindictive. At first, they linked to blogs, then to high-profile outlets repeating the talking points – a self-perpetuating spin machine.

Farrow reiterated his support for Dylan and expressed his unwavering belief in her allegations:

I believe my sister. This was always true as a brother who trusted her and, even at 5 years old, was troubled by our father's strange behavior around her: Climbing into her bed in the middle of the night, forcing her to suck his thumb – behavior that had prompted him to enter into therapy focused on his inappropriate conduct with children prior to the allegations.

In closing his guest column, Farrow expressed his view of media culture as one that actively discourages victims of abuse from coming forward. Farrow said that victims are pressured to remain silent by threat of "having those tough newsroom conversations, making the case for burning bridges with powerful public figures" and "going up against angry fans and angry publicists". Farrow's regard for Hollywood (and media in general), as represented in his 2016 Hollywood Reporter guest column, foreshadows his investigation into the alleged misconduct of Harvey Weinstein. His reporting on this was published the following year.

On October 10, 2017, The New Yorker published an investigative article by Farrow detailing allegations of sexual misconduct against film producer Harvey Weinstein five days after The New York Times published the findings of its own investigation into Weinstein. It was subsequently revealed that Farrow originally worked on the story for NBC and that the network decided against airing his initial findings. The New Yorker won the 2018 Pulitzer Prize for Public Service for Farrow's reporting, sharing the award with Jodi Kantor and Meghan Twohey at The New York Times.

In 2018 Farrow was included in Time's "100 Most Influential People in the World" list. On May 7, 2018, The New Yorker published a joint article by Farrow and reporter Jane Mayer stating that New York State Attorney General Eric Schneiderman had physically abused at least four women with whom he had been romantically involved during his term in office, and that he had habitually abused alcohol and prescription drugs. Schneiderman resigned within hours of publication of the article on the following day. Mayer and Farrow reported that they had confirmed the women's allegations with photographs of contusions and with statements from friends with whom the alleged victims had confided subsequent to the claimed assaults. Though he denied the allegations, Schneiderman said that he resigned because they "effectively prevent me from leading the office's work". Governor Andrew Cuomo assigned a special prosecutor to investigate the filing of possible criminal charges against Schneiderman.

On July 27, 2018, The New Yorker published an article by Farrow saying that six women had accused media executive and CBS CEO Leslie Moonves of harassment and intimidation, and that dozens more described abuse at his company. On August 23, The New Yorker published an article by Adam Entous and Farrow stating that top aides of the Trump White House circulated a conspiracy memo entitled "The Echo Chamber" about President Barack Obama's aides.

On September 14, 2018, Farrow and Jane Mayer published information pertaining to an allegation of sexual assault against lawyer, jurist, and then-United States Supreme Court nominee Brett Kavanaugh.

In early 2019, Farrow said he and another journalist received demands from American Media, Inc. that sought to extort or blackmail him. He investigated the concealment by the MIT Media Lab of its involvement with Jeffrey Epstein, leading to the resignation of Joi Ito, director of the Media Lab, and an internal investigation by MIT.

On July 3, 2021, The New Yorker published an investigative article by Farrow and journalist Jia Tolentino detailing the Britney Spears conservatorship dispute. The article described the events related to the establishment of the conservatorship, alleged that Britney Spears was subject to a variety of abuses under her father Jamie Spears's control, and included testimonies from various named sources close to Britney.

In April 2026, Farrow and Andrew Marantz published an article about OpenAI CEO Sam Altman, containing allegations that Altman changed his positions on AI safety, had a distinct "relentless will to power", and displayed a pattern of misrepresenting facts. After an assailant targeted Altman's home with a Molotov cocktail, Altman suggested the article's publication could make the environment "more dangerous" for him, despite the San Francisco Police Department not having an established motive for the attack at the time.

=== Film and television work ===
Farrow became involved in popular entertainment as well. He voiced minor characters in the English-language versions of two Japanese animated films, From Up on Poppy Hill (2011) and The Wind Rises (2013). He also guest starred as himself on the Netflix comedy series Unbreakable Kimmy Schmidt.

Farrow appeared on the daytime talk show The View as a guest co-host on December 3, 2019. Farrow starred as a Guest Judge on Ru Paul's Drag Race All Stars 7 All Winners in episode 10: "The Kennedy Davenport Center Honors Hall of Shade", airing on July 15, 2022. He sat alongside Ru Paul, Michelle Visage, and Ross Mathews. In 2024, he was a guest judge on the fourteenth episode of RuPaul's Drag Race season 16 (episode "Booked and Blessed"). He also has a small motion-capture role in the 2024 remake of the video game Riven.

In January 2018, Farrow signed a three-year deal at HBO to produce and develop documentaries. Farrow served as an executive producer on Endangered directed by Heidi Ewing and Rachel Grady, focusing on threats against journalists which released in June 2022. In 2024, Farrow starred in and produced Surveilled focusing on cyberintelligence firm NSO Group.

== Recognition ==
In 2008, Farrow was awarded Refugees International's McCall-Pierpaoli Humanitarian Award for "extraordinary service to refugees and displaced people". In 2009, Farrow was named New York magazine's "New Activist" of the year and included on its list of individuals "on the verge of changing their worlds". In 2011, Harper's Bazaar listed him as an "up-and-coming politician". In 2012, he was ranked number one in "Law and Policy" on Forbes magazine's "30 Under 30" Most Influential People. He was also awarded an honorary doctorate by Dominican University of California in 2012. In its 2013 retrospective of men born in its 80 years of publication, Esquire magazine named him the man of the year of his birth.

In February 2014, Farrow received the third annual Cronkite Award for "Excellence in Exploration and Journalism" from Reach the World, in recognition of his work since 2001, including his being a UNICEF Spokesperson for Youth in 2001. Some media outlets noted that the award came three days after Ronan Farrow Daily began airing and suggested that the award was therefore not justified. Farrow is the recipient of the Stonewall Community Foundation's 2016 Vision Award for his reporting on transgender issues. He was also recognized by the Point Foundation in 2018, receiving the Point Courage Award for his in-depth reporting on #MeToo. In July 2018, Farrow won the National Lesbian and Gay Journalists Association's Journalist of the Year award. In 2019, he was listed among the 40 Under 40 List put out by Connecticut Magazine. He was also named the Out100 Journalist of the Year.

In May 2020, The New York Times reporter Ben Smith published an article entitled "Is Ronan Farrow Too Good to Be True?" and asserted that some of Farrow's journalism did not hold up to scrutiny. Farrow stated in a response that he stood by his reporting. In a Slate piece, Ashley Feinberg described Smith's report as an "overcorrection for resistance journalism" and opined that his approach showed "broad-mindedness, sacrificing accuracy for some vague, centrist perception of fairness."

The audiobook for Farrow's book Catch and Kill, read by Farrow himself, was nominated for Best Spoken Word Album at the 63rd Annual Grammy Awards.

== Personal life ==
As of August 2019, Farrow resided on the Lower East Side of Manhattan. He publicly identified as part of the LGBTQ community in 2018.

Farrow began dating podcast host and former presidential speech writer Jon Lovett in 2011. The two became engaged in 2019 after Farrow wrote a proposal to Lovett in the draft for his book Catch and Kill: Lies, Spies, and a Conspiracy to Protect Predators. The couple bought a $1.87 million home in Los Angeles in August 2019. In March 2023, Lovett stated on his podcast that the couple had separated.

== Written works ==
=== Books ===
- Farrow, Ronan (2018). War on Peace: The End of Diplomacy and the Decline of American Influence. New York: WW Norton & Co. ISBN 9780393652109
- Farrow, Ronan (2019). Catch and Kill: Lies, Spies, and a Conspiracy to Protect Predators. New York: Little, Brown and Company ISBN 9780316486637

=== Essays and reporting ===
- Farrow, Ronan (October 23, 2017). "From Aggressive Overtures to Sexual Assault: Harvey Weinstein's Accusers Tell Their Stories". A Reporter at Large. The New Yorker. 93 (33): 42–49.
- — (October 27, 2017). "Weighing the Costs of Speaking Out About Harvey Weinstein". News Desk. The New Yorker.
- — (November 6, 2017). "Harvey Weinstein's Army of Spies". News Desk. The New Yorker.
- — (November 14, 2017). "Rose McGowan Speaks Out About Her Arrest on Drug Charges". News Desk. The New Yorker.
- — (November 21, 2017). "Harvey Weinstein's Secret Settlements". News Desk. The New Yorker.
- — (February 16, 2018). "Donald Trump, a Playboy Model, and a System for Concealing Infidelity". News Desk. The New Yorker.
- — (April 12, 2018). "The National Enquirer, a Trump Rumor, and Another Secret Payment to Buy Silence". News Desk. The New Yorker.
- — (April 19, 2018). "Inside Rex Tillerson's Ouster". Page-Turner. The New Yorker.
- — (May 6, 2018). "Israeli Operatives Who Aided Harvey Weinstein Collected Information on Former Obama Administration Officials". News Desk. The New Yorker.
- — & Jane Mayer (May 7, 2018). "Four Women Accuse New York's Attorney General of Physical Abuse". News Desk. The New Yorker.
- Farrow, Ronan (May 16, 2018). "Missing Files Motivated the Leak of Michael Cohen's Financial Records". News Desk. The New Yorker.
- — (May 24, 2018). "Behind the Scenes of Harvey Weinstein's Arrest". News Desk. The New Yorker.
- — (August 6, 2018). "Les Moonves and CBS Face Allegations of Sexual Misconduct". A Reporter at Large. The New Yorker. 94 (23): 46–55.
- — & Adam Entous (August 23, 2018). "The Conspiracy Memo About Obama Aides That Circulated in the Trump White House". News Desk. The New Yorker.
- Farrow, Ronan (September 9, 2018). "As Leslie Moonves Negotiates His Exit from CBS, Six Women Raise New Assault and Harassment Claims". News Desk. The New Yorker.
- — & Jane Mayer (September 14, 2018). "A Sexual-Misconduct Allegation Against the Supreme Court Nominee Brett Kavanaugh Stirs Tension Among Democrats in Congress". News Desk. The New Yorker.
- — & Jane Mayer (September 23, 2018). "Senate Democrats Investigate a New Allegation of Sexual Misconduct, from Brett Kavanaugh's College Years". News Desk. The New Yorker.
- — & Jane Mayer (September 30, 2018). "The Confusion Surrounding the F.B.I.'s Renewed Investigation of Brett Kavanaugh". News Desk. The New Yorker.
- — (May 2, 2022). "The surveillance states : as democratic governments worry about sophisticated hacking software, they increasingly rely on it". A Reporter at Large. The New Yorker. 98 (10): 36–47. (Note: Online version is titled "How Democracies Spy on Their Citizens".)
- — (March 31, 2025). "Open Secret: Why did police let one of America's most prolific predators get away for so long?". The New Yorker.
- — & Andrew Marantz (April 6, 2026). "Sam Altman May Control Our Future—Can He Be Trusted?". A Reporter at Large. The New Yorker.

== See also ==
- Black Cube
- LGBT culture in New York City
- List of LGBT people from New York City
- #MeToo movement
- New Yorkers in journalism
- List of Rhodes Scholars
