= Maureen Orth =

American journalist (born 1943)

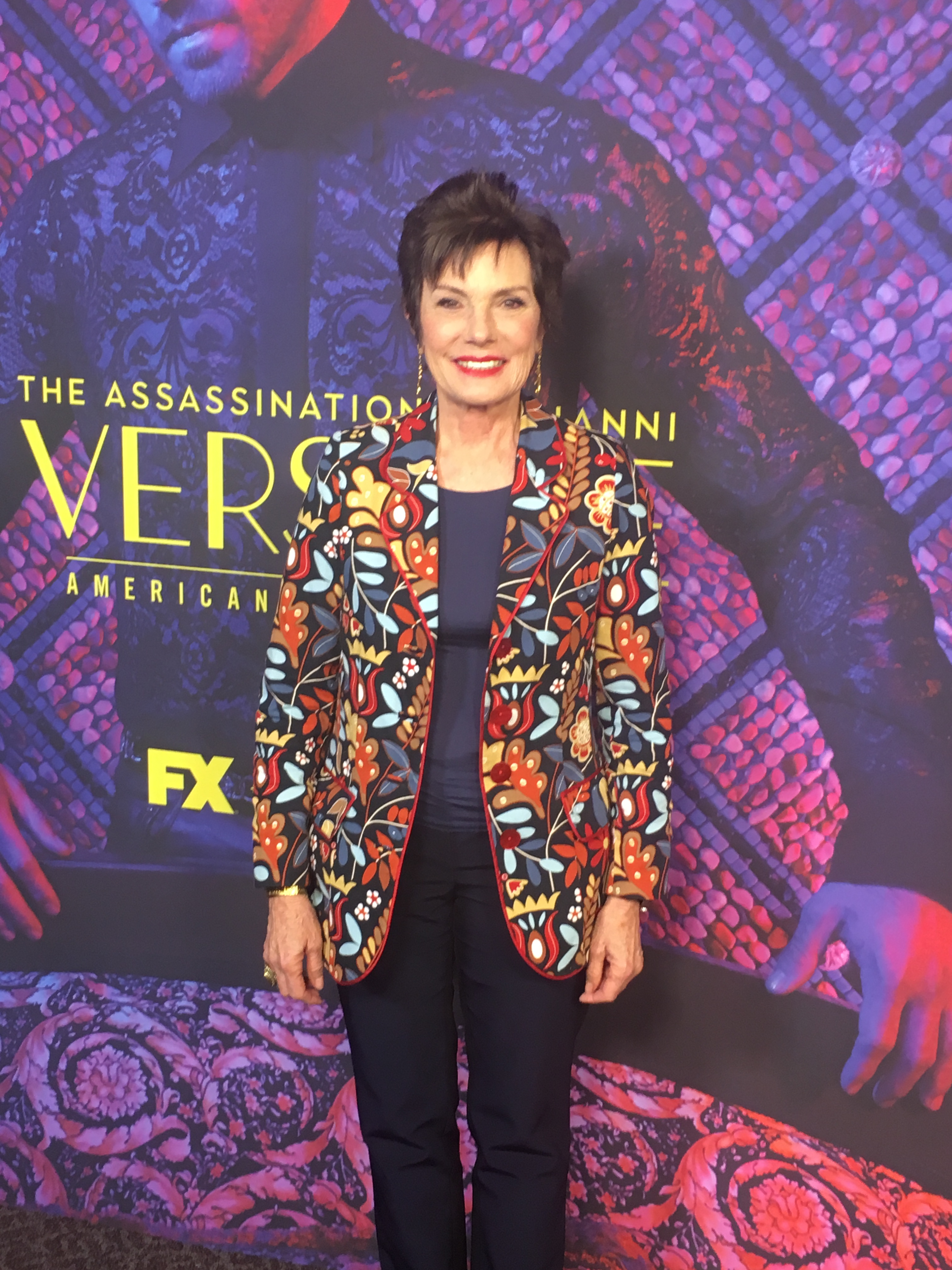
- Orth in 2018
- Born: Maureen Orth; 1943 (age 82–83); Berkeley, California, U.S.
- Education: University of California, Berkeley (BA); University of California, Los Angeles (MA)
- Occupations: Journalist; writer
- Spouse: Tim Russert (m. 1983; died 2008)
- Children: Luke Russert
- Website: maureenorth.com

Maureen Orth (born 1943) is an American journalist and writer. She has been a special correspondent for Vanity Fair since 1993. Her reporting on high-profile criminal cases was the basis for documentaries and television series about Woody Allen, Michael Jackson, and Gianni Versace.

Orth is the founder of the Marina Orth Foundation, which has established a model education program in Colombia emphasizing technology, English, and leadership. She is the widow of television journalist Tim Russert.

== Early life and education ==
Maureen Orth was born in 1943, Berkeley, California, and grew up in the Bay Area, the daughter of Helen (Pierotti) Orth and Karl Orth. She has two siblings, Christina Orth and the late Dan Orth.

Orth attended Alameda High School. She completed a degree in (political science, 1964) at the University of California, Berkeley. At Berkeley, Orth was a member of the Kappa Kappa Gamma sorority.

Following her graduation from college, she served in the Peace Corps in Medellín, Colombia, from 1964 to 1966. Orth later earned a master's degree in journalism and documentary film from the University of California, Los Angeles, in 1969.

== Career ==
Before launching her career in journalism, Orth worked in Washington, D.C. and helped organize the hearings for the House Select Subcommittee on Education on behalf of the proposed National Environmental Education Act in conjunction with the first Earth Day.

Orth began her journalism career in San Francisco in 1970 chronicling the counterculture for the San Francisco Examiner. She was mentored by author Alex Haley. In 1971, she became the West Coast correspondent of The Village Voice and also freelanced for the Los Angeles Times and Rolling Stone.

In 1972, Orth joined TVTV, a pioneering video group that had obtained a PBS grant to cover both the Republican and Democratic national conventions in Miami Beach, Florida. The resulting films used the first ever footage shot on the convention floor using ½ inch Sony Portapak videotape.

Orth moved to New York in 1973. She wrote the Ms. magazine cover story titled “Suffer the Little Children…The American Child-Care Disgrace.”

=== Newsweek ===
Orth was hired as one of the first female writers for Newsweek, covering music, books and movies. She was a plaintiff in a successful 1970 lawsuit claiming that the newsroom discriminated against women. At Newsweek, Orth wrote eight cover stories in five years on subjects including Bob Dylan, Bruce Springsteen, Stevie Wonder, and the 1974 film The Godfather Part II. She was the only journalist to report from the notoriously chaotic set of Apocalypse Now in the Philippines.

In 1975, Orth took a brief leave of absence from Newsweek to be the assistant to director Lina Wertmüller during the filming of Seven Beauties in Italy. The film received four nominations at the 49th Academy Awards. She later wrote about the experience in an article for the magazine.

When news broke in August 1977 that Elvis Presley had died, Orth requested to be sent to Memphis, Tennessee to cover the story. She wrote the first news piece to suggest that Presley's official cause of death might not have been a heart attack. She was a contestant on The Gong Show and wrote about it for the magazine.

=== Freelance work ===
Between 1978 and 1980, Orth was a senior editor at New York and New West magazines. In 1981-1982, she was the principal correspondent of Newsweek Woman on the Lifetime television network. From 1983 to 1984, she was a network correspondent for NBC News. Orth was a contributing editor at Vogue from 1984 to 1989, and a columnist for New York Woman from 1986 to 1990. She has also freelanced for The New York Times, The Washington Post and The Wall Street Journal.

=== Vanity Fair ===
Orth has written for Vanity Fair since 1988 and has been a special correspondent for the magazine since 1993. Among the heads of state she has interviewed are Russian President Vladimir Putin, German Chancellor Angela Merkel, British Prime Minister Margaret Thatcher, Argentinian President Carlos Menem, and Irish President Mary Robinson. Orth secured the first interview with Thatcher after she left office.

Shortly after the September 11 attacks, Orth traveled to Central Asia to investigate the connection between drugs and terrorism for a piece titled "Afghanistan's Deadly Habit".

Orth has investigated pedophile priest Paul Shanley and the Laci Peterson murder. She has also written articles on Tom Cruise and Scientology, Madonna, Tina Turner, Karl Lagerfeld and Conrad Black.

Orth chronicled the hostage rescue of Colombian-French politician Ingrid Betancourt in a November 2008 piece titled "Inside Colombia's Hostage War" and wrote about Elda Neyis, also known as Karina, Colombia's most notorious FARC female revolutionary.

Orth was one of the first journalists to report on child molestation charges against Woody Allen and Michael Jackson.

==== Reporting on Michael Jackson ====
In January 1994, Vanity Fair published "Nightmare in Neverland", the first of five articles from 1994 through 2005 that investigated the 1993 child sexual abuse accusations against Michael Jackson.

She observed and wrote about two of Jackson's trials, including a civil lawsuit filed against him in 2003 by concert promoter Marcel Avram, and the 2005 criminal trial for child molestation, for which Jackson was acquitted.

Orth’s reporting was later associated with the 2019 HBO documentary Leaving Neverland.

==== Reporting on Woody Allen and Mia Farrow ====
Orth reported extensively for Vanity Fair on the child molestation charges against director Woody Allen.

Orth's 10,000-word November 1992 piece, "Mia's Story", broke the news that Allen was in therapy for inappropriate behavior towards his then 7-year-old adopted daughter Dylan and the history of Allen's relationship with Farrow's adopted teenage daughter, Soon-Yi Previn. In 2013, Orth also broke the news that a video of Dylan confiding to Farrow about what she said happened with Allen had been obtained by New York’s Fox Channel 5 but was never aired. "Mia’s Story" is among the most-read stories in Vanity Fair's archives.

In 2013, in a piece titled "Momma Mia!" Orth obtained the first on-the-record interview with Dylan Farrow, then age 28. In the story, Dylan detailed her allegation that Allen sexually abused her in the attic of the family home, which Allen strongly denied. Dylan also discussed the impact the child molestation case had on her life and the Farrow family Orth interviewed eight of Farrow’s children for the 9,400-word story which generated significant media interest in Farrow’s son, Ronan, as possibly the biological son of Frank Sinatra. All eight of Farrow’s children interviewed for the story said they suffered psychological damage from the case and wanted nothing to do with Allen.

In 2014, in response to Orth’s 2013 story and the renewed media attention on the decades-old accusations and custody fight between Allen and Farrow, Allen drafted a lengthy opinion piece published in The New York Times denying that he had abused Dylan when she was a child in the early 1990s. On the same day that Allen’s editorial was published in The New York Times, Orth published “10 Undeniable Facts About the Woody Allen Sexual Abuse Allegation” in Vanity Fair.

Much of the reporting by Orth on the relationship between Allen and Mia Farrow was used by filmmakers Kirby Dick, Amy Ziering and Amy Herdy as the basis for their 2021 HBO documentary Allen v. Farrow. Orth was interviewed for the documentary and appears on camera in episodes one and three of the four-part series.

==== Reporting on Andrew Cunanan and Gianni Versace ====
In the spring of 1997, Orth read a news story in the New York Daily News about the manhunt for Andrew Cunanan and an unlikely string of murders. She began conducting research and gathering information on Cunanan and spent nine weeks developing a story set to appear in Vanity Fair. Aside of Versace, Orth included extensive coverage on the backgrounds of the rest of Cunanan's victims, including his former boyfriend David Madson, his friend Jeffrey Trail, and Chicago businessman Lee Miglin, as well as information on the fourth victim William Reese.

While Vanity Fair was doing the final fact-checking of Orth's article, Italian fashion designer Gianni Versace was killed in Miami on July 15, 1997. That night, Cunanan was named as a suspect and the following morning Orth broke the news on NBC's Today show that Versace and Cunanan had met each other backstage at the San Francisco Opera in 1990 when the designer created the costumes for the opera's production of Capriccio. Orth conducted additional research in Miami for her piece "The Killer’s Trail", which appeared in the September 1997 issue of Vanity Fair.

After Versace's murder, and before her article was published in the magazine, book publisher Delacorte was rumored to have paid Orth a significant advance for a book-length reworking of the story. Two years later, Orth published Vulgar Favors: Andrew Cunanan, Gianni Versace, and the Largest Failed Manhunt in U.S. History. She dedicated the book to her husband, Tim Russert, and their son Luke, as well as Orth's mother. In the book, she claimed, among other things, that Versace had AIDS and that his deteriorating health was kept a secret to avoid putting a public listing of his company at risk.

In October 2016, reports began circulating that FX would be developing a television miniseries based on Orth's book as part of the American Crime Story franchise. In January 2018, FX debuted a nine-episode miniseries, American Crime Story: The Assassination of Gianni Versace starring Darren Criss, Édgar Ramírez, Penélope Cruz and Ricky Martin. Orth was a creative consultant on the series.

The Versace family was unhappy with how Gianni Versace was portrayed in both the book and the television show, stating that it presented a distorted and fictionalized account of the designer's life. At the time of the series's premiere, the publisher of the book vigorously defended Orth's reporting, saying:

"First published almost 19 years ago, Vulgar Favors is a carefully reported and extensively-sourced work of investigative journalism by an award-winning journalist with impeccable credentials. The book has stood the test of time and is widely regarded as the definitive account of Andrew Cunanan's chilling crime spree. Random House stands by the book and its author, Maureen Orth."

At the 70th Primetime Emmy Awards, the series won seven awards including Outstanding Limited Series, Outstanding Casting, and Outstanding Contemporary Costumes. Orth appeared onstage with the cast and producers to accept the award. The series also received four Golden Globe nominations, winning two for Best Limited Series and Best Actor in a Limited Series for Darren Criss's portrayal of Cunanan.

== Personal life ==
Orth lives in Washington, D.C. In 1983, she married political journalist Tim Russert, whom she met at the 1980 Democratic National Convention. Their son Luke, who was born in August 1985, is a former NBC News correspondent.

Orth was close friends with writer Larry McMurtry, who dedicated his 1985 novel Lonesome Dove to her.

Orth has served on the Executive Board of the College of Letters and Sciences of the University of California, Berkeley and has been a Trustee of the University of California, Berkeley Foundation since 2010 . She has also served on the board of Internews.

Orth and her family have vacationed on Nantucket Island since 1993, where their neighbors included television personality Fred Rogers.

== Philanthropy ==
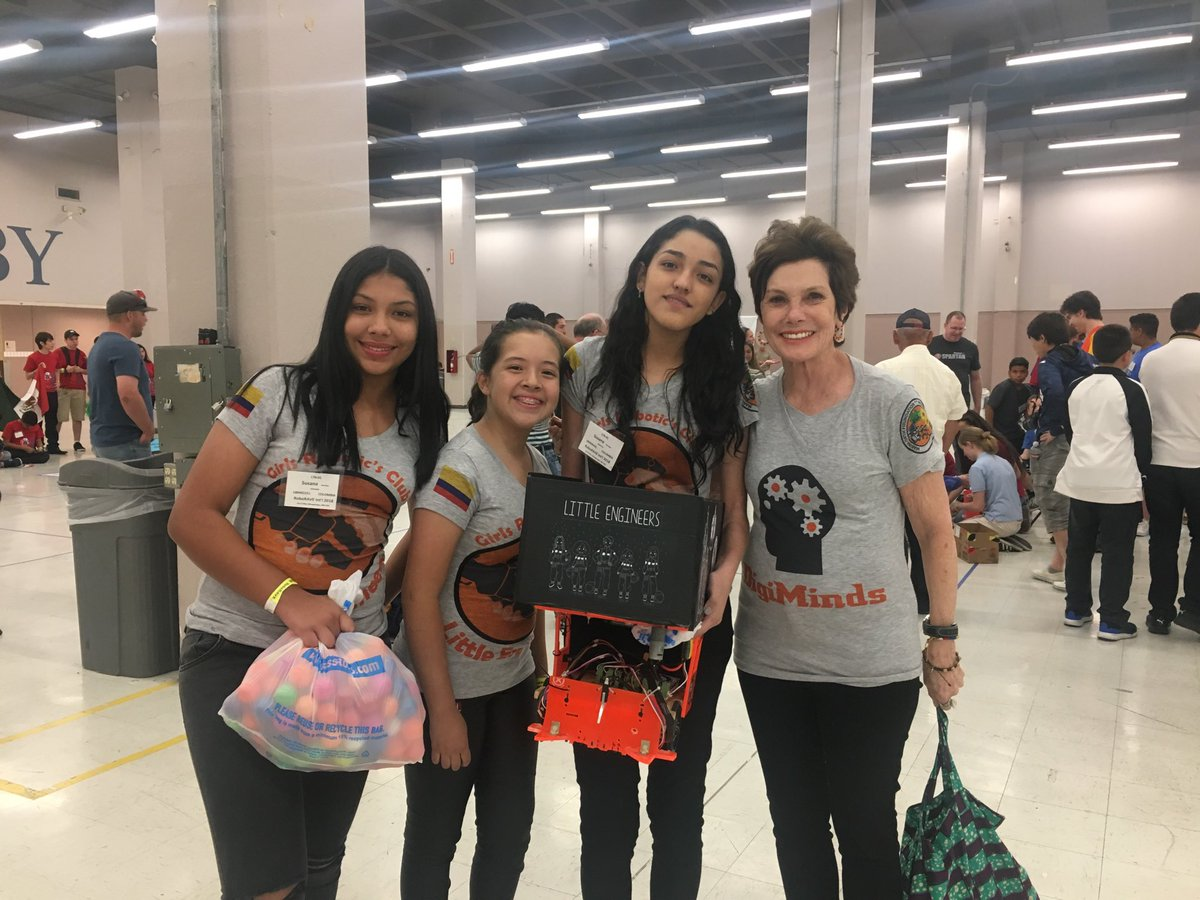
Maureen Orth and students from Colombia

Orth developed an interest in Colombia while a Peace Corps volunteer in Medellin, Colombia following college. While there, she built a school the community named for her: Escuela Marina Orth. In 2005, at the request of the Secretary of Education of Medellin, she founded two non-profit foundations: The Marina Orth Foundation, a 501(c)(3) organization in the United States, and Fundacion Marina Orth in Colombia. The Marina Orth Foundation serves 21 schools. The program emphasizes STEM, robotics, English and leadership. More than 13,000 students have been involved with the program. International volunteers help to teach English and organize extra-curricular activities. The foundation has sent the school's robotics teams to international competitions.

Orth continues to support the Peace Corps. For the 50th anniversary of the program in 2011, she produced a series of video postcards celebrating the organization.

== Books ==
- Vulgar Favors: Andrew Cunanan, Gianni Versace and the Largest Failed Manhunt in U.S. History(1999)
- The Importance of Being Famous: Behind the Scenes of the Celebrity-Industrial Complex (2004)

== Awards and honors ==
- National Magazine Award for group coverage of the arts while at Newsweek (1973)
- National Magazine Award nomination for her story in Vanity Fair on Arianna Huffington and Michael Huffington titled "Arianna's Virtual Candidate" (1994)
- National Alumnae Achievement Award from the Kappa Kappa Gamma sorority (2006)
- Emily Couric Women's Leadership Award, Charlottesville, Virginia (2012)
- Order of San Carlos, Colombia's highest civilian honor for outstanding service from Colombian President Juan Manuel Santos (2015)
- McCall-Pierpaoli Humanitarian of the Year Award from Refugees International (2015)
- Distinguished Alumnus from the Cal Alumni Club of Washington D.C (2016)
- Doctorate in Humane Letters from the University of San Francisco (2017)
- Campanile Excellence in Achievement Award from the University of California, Berkeley (2021)
