= Allen v. Farrow =

American documentary television miniseries

- Genre: Documentary
- Directed by: Kirby Dick; Amy Ziering
- Music by: Michael Abels
- Country of origin: United States
- Original language: English
- No. of episodes: 4

Production
- Executive producers: Kirby Dick; Amy Ziering; Dan Cogan; Tara Lynda Guber; Maiken Baird; Ian Darling; Steve Cohen; Paula Froehle; Debbie L. McLeod; Jenny Raskin; Geralyn White Dreyfous; Regina K. Scully; Nancy Abraham; Lisa Heller
- Producers: Amy Herdy; Jamie Rogers
- Cinematography: Thaddeus Wadleigh; Thorsten Thielow
- Editors: Mikaela Shwer; Parker Laramie; Sara Newens
- Running time: 56–73 minutes
- Production companies: HBO Documentary Films; Impact Partners; Jane Doe Films; Chicago Media Project; Artemis Rising Foundation; The Lozen Foundation

Original release
- Network: HBO
- Release: February 21 – March 14, 2021

Allen v. Farrow is an American documentary television miniseries directed by Kirby Dick and Amy Ziering that explores an allegation of sexual abuse made against Woody Allen in 1992. It consists of four episodes and premiered on February 21, 2021, on HBO.

The series features home videos and interviews with family members, including Allen's accuser, Dylan Farrow. Produced over a three-year period by Kirby Dick, Amy Ziering, and Amy Herdy, it involves extensive research into court documents and police reports, with some witnesses granting their first public interviews. Referred to as the "Eliza Project" to maintain secrecy, the series garnered the participation of Dylan and Mia Farrow after significant persuasion. Notably, Allen and Soon-Yi Previn did not respond to the request to participate in the documentary, while Moses Farrow, who supports Allen's perspective, declined to be interviewed. The documentary incorporates audio passages from Allen's 2020 memoir, Apropos of Nothing. Allen denounced the series, which he accused of perpetuating falsehoods.

Allen v. Farrow received generally positive reviews from critics, though it was criticized by some commentators as one-sided, for showing Allen in a harsh light and allegedly under-utilizing testimony and evidence supporting his claims of innocence. Its first episode garnered just over 1 million viewers, the most for a multi-episode HBO documentary series since The Case Against Adnan Syed in 2019. The series was nominated for seven Primetime Emmy Awards, including Outstanding Documentary or Nonfiction Series.

== Plot ==
The series examines the sexual assault allegation made against Woody Allen by his adopted daughter Dylan Farrow, who was seven when the abuse allegedly occurred. It follows the custody battle between Allen and his former partner Mia Farrow, his marriage to her adopted daughter Soon-Yi Previn, who is 35 years younger than Allen, and the events of subsequent years.

Along with Mia and Dylan Farrow, Allen's and Farrow's biological son Ronan Farrow and Carly Simon appear in the series, as do family friends, experts, prosecutors, and investigators.

The series includes a videotaped account by Dylan of the alleged assault shortly after she said it occurred. The tape has never before been publicly aired. It is controversial, characterized as evidence of the allegation's veracity by one side and by the other as evidence she was coached. The filmmakers question a report issued by the Yale Child Sexual Abuse Clinic, at Yale-New Haven Hospital, which found Dylan not credible after interviewing her. Also in the documentary are home videos shot by Mia Farrow and surreptitious recordings of telephone conversations between her and Allen.

Allen is described by witnesses as obsessed with Dylan, following her wherever she went, and behaving in other inappropriate ways, such as having Dylan suck on his thumb. A clinical psychologist found that this behavior was excessively intense but not sexual. The film also suggests that Allen "groomed" Soon-Yi for years, and that his sexual interest in her may have begun when she was in high school.

Ronan Farrow alleges in the documentary that Allen offered to pay for his college tuition but only if he denounced his mother and sister, which he declined to do.

The series examines Allen's films in light of the allegations, and provides extensive background on Allen's emphasis on young women in his films and personal life. Included is an interview with actress and model Christina Engelhardt, who claims she became romantically involved with Allen at 17 and believes that she was the inspiration for Mariel Hemingway's 17-year-old character in Manhattan.

Allen did not respond to requests to be interviewed, but the series includes clips from the audiobook of his 2020 memoir Apropos of Nothing.

== Episodes ==
No.	Title	Original release date	U.S. viewers (millions)
1	"Episode One"	February 21, 2021	0.394
2	"Episode Two"	February 28, 2021	0.333
Mia Farrow is born into a large acting and directing family. She is one of seven children. This inspires her to have a large family of her own. Her father John, an alcoholic, dies of a massive heart attack when Mia is only 17. At age 18, Mia's career takes off with the soap opera Peyton Place, which had 60 million viewers per week in the 1960s. During this time, she meets Frank Sinatra. Christina Engelhardt claims to have dated Woody Allen when he was in his 40s and she was 17 years old.
3	"Episode Three"	March 7, 2021	0.321
Richard A. Gardner's parental alienation syndrome is used against Mia Farrow's claims of child sexual abuse.
4	"Episode Four"	March 14, 2021	0.415
The Connecticut state prosecutor drops the case in 1992 because Dylan becomes totally unresponsive to his questions and does not cooperate. In light of the Me Too movement, the adult Dylan regrets not having been forthright. The 47-year-old Soon-Yi, Allen's current wife, accuses Mia of having mistreated her and calls the treatment of Allen "unjust".

== Production ==
The series was produced in secret over three years. Kirby Dick, Amy Ziering and Amy Herdy tracked down court documents and police reports, with some witnesses publicly interviewed for the first time. To keep matters "close to the vest" they called the series the "Eliza Project", using a name once used by Dylan.

Allen and Soon-Yi Previn did not respond to the filmmakers' requests to participate in the documentary. Allen's and Farrow's adopted son Moses Farrow, who sides with Allen, declined to cooperate. Ziering says Dylan and Mia Farrow were not eager to participate and did not initially agree to do so, and that it took one month for Dylan to agree and 10 months to convince Mia. Dick has said that the filmmakers focused on Dylan Farrow's version of events because "Woody's story is out there".

The series uses passages, spoken by Allen, from the audiobook of his 2020 memoir, Apropos of Nothing. After the first episode aired, the publisher accused the filmmakers of violating the audiobook's copyright. Tony Lyons, President of Skyhorse Publishing, called it a "blatant appropriation of Mr. Allen's intellectual property" that he described as "unquestionably copyright infringement under existing legal precedent." The filmmakers contended that their use of audio excerpts was allowed by "the Fair Use doctrine."

== Allen and Previn statement ==
On February 21, the day the series was aired on HBO, Woody Allen and Soon-Yi Previn released a response to the documentary, stating as follows:

"These documentarians had no interest in the truth. Instead, they spent years surreptitiously collaborating with the Farrows and their enablers to put together a hatchet job riddled with falsehoods. Woody and Soon-Yi were approached less than two months ago and given only a matter of days 'to respond.' Of course, they declined to do so. As has been known for decades, these allegations are categorically false. Multiple agencies investigated them at the time and found that, whatever Dylan Farrow may have been led to believe, absolutely no abuse had ever taken place. It is sadly unsurprising that the network to air this is HBO—which has a standing production deal and business relationship with Ronan Farrow. While this shoddy hit piece may gain attention, it does not change the facts."

== Documentary producer's response ==
Producer Amy Herdy disputed Allen's claim about the timing of the filmmakers' contact with him. She said she reached out to Allen's publicist Leslee Dart in June 2018 and received no reply. She said, "I know they got my request, because I was able to get an assistant on the phone saying [to her], 'You are getting my emails, right?' And she said 'yes.' But they never responded."

== Reception ==
On Rotten Tomatoes, the series holds an approval rating of 84% based on 56 reviews, with an average rating of 7.4/10. The website's critical consensus states, "Allen V. Farrow unearths new evidence in a well-known case to craft a compelling —if one-sided—indictment of society's complicity in upholding powerful people over seeking justice for those they've wronged." On Metacritic, it has a weighted average score of 75 out of 100, based on 29 critics, indicating "generally favorable reviews".

Los Angeles Times critic Lorraine Ali wrote that the series is "a comprehensive, convincing and ultimately devastating documentary that threatens to burn what's left of [Allen's] career and legacy to the ground." Dorothy Rabinowitz's review in The Wall Street Journal describes it as "an extraordinarily detailed investigative work". Variety's review said that Dylan speaking out "represents for her, one might hope, a closing of this chapter and, perhaps, a chance to start anew". Brian Lowry of CNN wrote, "despite the painstaking research, viewers might come away not entirely sure what they 'know,' as opposed to what they believe", but said that "even a generous reading of Allen's behavior, however, casts him in a troubling light."

Nick Allen of RogerEbert.com gave the docuseries three and a half out of four stars, and wrote that "It is the exact type of expansive analysis that this horrific Hollywood saga has needed, and I urge both those who believe and don't believe the Farrows' side of the story to watch it." Eric Deggans of NPR wrote that the series holds Allen's "past behavior up to modern sensibilities in a way that makes him look terrible", but that "questions will remain about what may be left out, absent the direct participation of the man accused of so much."

=== Criticism of one-sidedness ===
Hadley Freeman in The Guardian commented that Allen v. Farrow "sets itself up as an investigation but much more resembles PR, as biased and partial as a political candidate's advert vilifying an opponent in election season." Freeman observed that Ziering and Dick had been criticized for "putting advocacy ahead of accuracy" in their 2015 documentary about campus rape, Hunting Ground, which "used discredited data".

The Hollywood Reporter's review said that Allen v. Farrow "prosecutes the case against Woody Allen in ways more emotional than intellectually persuasive". A Globe and Mail reviewer wrote that viewers get "a complex and sometimes confusing picture of the family dynamic", with Mia Farrow "controlling" the narrative, and that there is an "attempted evisceration of Allen's denials, but some of it is unsupported." He called the series "incomplete".

The Dutch newspaper De Volkskrant asserted that anything that could exonerate Allen was "systematically pushed aside", while NRC Handelsblad concluded that the miniseries is partial to the point of being "blunt propaganda" by "activist" directors, "void of all pretense of journalistic integrity".

Some of the coverage focused on the lack of involvement of two of Farrow's adopted children, Moses Farrow and Soon-Yi Previn, who have offered accounts of their childhood that were critical of Mia Farrow. Screen Rant critic Lindsey Deroche noted that Moses declined to participate, but, still, "in order for the HBO documentary series to appear objective ... it needs to include every voice in the long history of this scandal...For Allen v. Farrow to be as effective as possible, it needs to appear objective and comprehensive—which requires including the perspective of Moses Farrow." In The Atlantic, Sophie Gilbert wrote that Soon-Yi's and Moses's non-cooperation did not justify giving "short shrift" to their public statements. She noted that both "have offered strikingly different versions of growing up in the Farrow household in the past, and [they] are cursorily dismissed on camera by their white siblings. The show's narrative is too determinedly focused for any nuance that might complicate its momentum."

Actor Alec Baldwin and comedian Bill Maher criticized the series for failing to give Allen's side of the story.

== Awards and nominations ==
Year	Award	Category	Nominee(s)	Result	Ref.
2021	Hollywood Critics Association TV Awards	Best Broadcast Network or Cable Docuseries, Documentary Television Movie, or Non-Fiction Series	Allen v. Farrow	Nominated	
2021	Primetime Emmy Awards	Outstanding Documentary or Nonfiction Series	Kirby Dick, Amy Ziering, Amy Herdy, Jamie Rogers, Dan Cogan, Lisa Heller, Nancy Abraham, Tara Lynda Guber and Sara Rodriguez	Nominated	
2021	Primetime Emmy Awards	Outstanding Directing for a Documentary/Nonfiction Program	Kirby Dick and Amy Ziering (for "Episode Three")	Nominated	
2021	Primetime Emmy Awards	Outstanding Writing for a Nonfiction Programming	Kirby Dick, Amy Ziering, Mikaela Shwer and Parker Laramie (for "Episode Three")	Nominated	
2021	Primetime Emmy Awards	Outstanding Music Composition for a Documentary Series or Special (Original Dramatic Score)	Michael Abels (for "Episode Four")	Nominated	
2021	Primetime Emmy Awards	Outstanding Original Main Title Theme Music	Michael Abels	Nominated	
2021	Primetime Emmy Awards	Outstanding Picture Editing for Nonfiction Programming	Parker Laramie and Sara Newens (for "Episode One")	Nominated	
2021	Primetime Emmy Awards	Outstanding Sound Editing for a Nonfiction or Reality Program (Single or Multi-Camera)	Dane A. Davis, Stephanie Flack, Jon Michaels, Ezra Dweck and Ellen Segal (for "Episode Two")	Nominated	
2021	TCA Awards	Outstanding Achievement in News and Information	Allen v. Farrow	Nominated	
2022	Producers Guild of America	Outstanding Producer of Nonfiction Television	Allen v. Farrow	Nominated	
