= Apropos of Nothing =

2020 memoir by Woody Allen

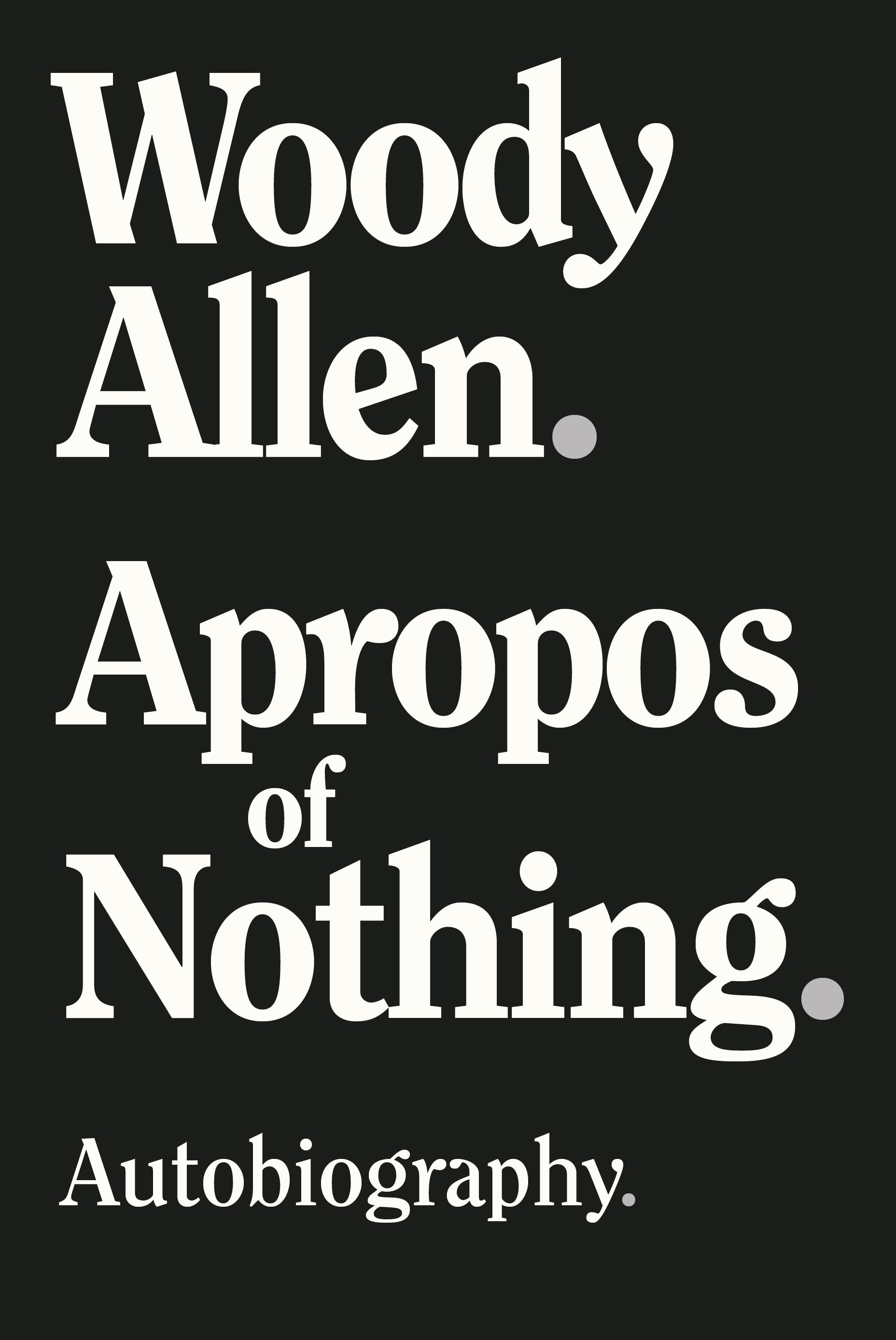
- Cover of first edition
- Author: Woody Allen
- Audio read by: Woody Allen
- Cover artist: Albert Tang and Brian Peterson
- Language: English
- Subject: Memoir
- Publisher: Arcade Publishing
- Publication date: March 23, 2020
- Publication place: United States
- Media type: Print (hardcover), e-book, audio
- Pages: 400
- ISBN: 978-1-951627-34-8
- OCLC: 1150889667

Apropos of Nothing is a 2020 memoir by American filmmaker and humorist Woody Allen. The book was originally due to be published by Grand Central Publishing, an imprint of Hachette Book Group, in April 2020, but on March 6, 2020, Hachette said they would no longer publish it. The memoir was published, in English, by Arcade Publishing and, in Italian, by La nave di Teseo on March 23, 2020. The photo of Allen on the back cover was taken by his longtime friend and frequent co-star Diane Keaton.

A statement by Arcade Publishing called the book "a candid and comprehensive personal account by Woody Allen of his life, ranging from his childhood in Brooklyn through his acclaimed career in film, theater, television, print and standup comedy, as well as exploring his relationships with family and friends." The book received mixed reviews upon release.

== Background ==
Allen has previously published essay collections. He had previously planned to release a memoir in 2003 published by Penguin, but reportedly changed his mind.

== Contents ==
Apropos of Nothing covers Allen's childhood in Brooklyn in the 1940s, as well as his early career writing on Sid Caesar's Your Show of Shows with Mel Brooks, Neil Simon, and Larry Gelbart, and his early standup years in Greenwich Village with Nichols and May and Dick Cavett. Allen also writes about his extensive filmography, and his collaborations with actors throughout his career such as Diane Keaton, Emma Stone, Scarlett Johansson, Cate Blanchett, Kate Winslet, Michael Caine, Alan Alda, Alec Baldwin, and Javier Bardem.

Allen also discusses his family life, including his relationship with his wife Soon-Yi Previn, ex-partner Mia Farrow, biological son Ronan Farrow, adoptive son Moses Farrow, and adoptive daughter Dylan Farrow. The book is dedicated to Previn. He also writes of the allegations of child molestation made against him by Dylan Farrow; he denies her charge, made in 1992 and again in 2014, that he sexually abused her when she was seven years old, but expresses sadness over their estrangement. He writes that he "would welcome Dylan with open arms if she'd ever want to reach out to us as Moses did, but so far that's still only a dream."

Allen, who directed Timothée Chalamet in A Rainy Day in New York in 2019, commented on Chalamet, who said he did not wish to profit from his work on the film and pledged to donate his salary from the film to three charities: Time's Up, RAINN, and the L.G.B.T. Center in New York. In Apropos of Nothing, Woody Allen accuses Chalamet of telling Allen's sister and producer Letty Aronson that, "[H]e needed to do that as he was up for an Oscar for Call Me by Your Name, and he and his agent felt he had a better chance of winning if he denounced me, so he did."

Allen also reveals that he and Louis C.K., whom Allen directed in Blue Jasmine (2013), attempted to write and act together in a comedy film. Their attempts to collaborate on a script failed, but C. K. contacted Allen years later offering Allen a role in a film he had written and planned to direct. After reading the script, Allen was shocked that the character he would be playing was a famed film director who was once accused of molesting a child, and is in a romantic relationship with a much younger woman. Allen declined the role, thinking the similarities to the allegations made against him would only play "right into the hands of the yahoos." C. K.'s planned film became I Love You, Daddy (2017). C. K.'s film was dropped by its distributor following sexual misconduct accusations made against him a week prior to the film's intended debut.

== Publication ==
=== Hachette and cancellation ===
The sexual abuse allegations against Allen and the Me Too movement reportedly led to Allen's memoir being rejected by several publishers, before being accepted by Grand Central Publishing, a division of Hachette Book Group. The book was officially announced by Grand Central Publishing on March 2, 2020.

Ronan and Dylan Farrow described the publication of the book by Hachette Book Group as "deeply upsetting" and a "betrayal". Ronan Farrow's book Catch and Kill (2019) was published by Little, Brown and Company, an imprint of Hachette Book Group. Farrow said that Hachette had shown "a lack of ethics and compassion for victims of sexual abuse" and announced he would no longer work with them. Michael Pietsch, CEO of Hachette Book Group, defended Grand Central Publishing's decision to publish the book, saying, "We do not allow anyone's publishing programme to interfere with anyone else's."

On March 5, 2020, approximately 75 employees of Hachette Book Group staged a walkout in protest of the book and gathered in Rockefeller Plaza, outside the publisher's New York offices. Other employees met with CEO Michael Pietsch to demand that Hachette cancel the publication of Allen's book. The following day, Hachette Book Group announced it would not publish the book, and would return the rights to Allen.

=== Reaction to cancellation ===
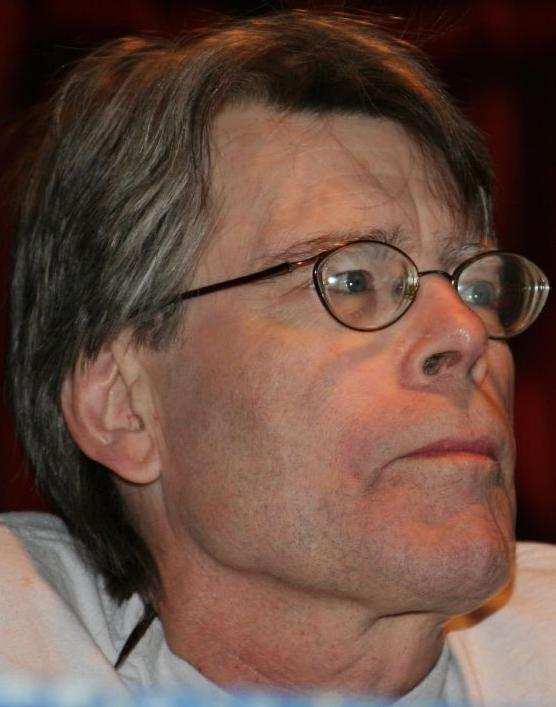
Stephen King was critical of Hachette's decision not to publish Apropos of Nothing.

Writer Stephen King criticized Hachette's decision to cancel the book on Twitter. King stated, "The Hachette decision to drop the Woody Allen book makes me very uneasy. It's not him; I don't give a damn about Mr Allen. It's who gets muzzled next that worries me ... If you think he's a paedophile, don't buy the book. Don't go to his movies. Don't go listen to him play jazz at the Carlyle Hotel. Vote with your wallet ... In America, that's how we do it." King also said that "it was fucking tone-deaf of Hachette to want to publish Woody Allen's book after publishing Ronan Farrow's."

Suzanne Nossel of PEN America said, "This case represented something of a perfect storm. It involved not just a controversial book, but a publisher that was working with individuals on both sides of a longstanding and traumatic familial rupture. This presented unique circumstances that clearly coloured the positions staked out and decisions taken. If the end result here is that this book, regardless of its merits, disappears without a trace, readers will be denied the opportunity to read it and render their own judgments." She also said that she hoped the controversy would not mean that publishers would reject "manuscripts that editors think are worthwhile but that are about, or even by, people who may be considered contemptible".

Jo Glanville, the former director of writers' group English PEN and an editor on Index on Censorship, also objected to Hachette's decision. In an article in The Observer, Glanville stated, "I am always afraid when a mob, however small and well-read, exercises power without any accountability, process or redress. That frightens me much more than the prospect of Woody Allen's autobiography hitting the bookstores." Noting that Allen had been investigated twice after the accusation of alleged abuse and never charged, Glanville argued that "The staff at Hachette who walked out were not behaving like publishers; they were acting as censors". Hachette's decision to cancel the book's publication was also criticized by Hadley Freeman in The Guardian, Fiona Sturges in The Independent, Robbie Collin in The Daily Telegraph, Kyle Smith in National Review, Bret Stephens in The New York Times, Lionel Shriver in The Spectator, Douglas Murray in The Spectator, Joe Nocera in Bloomberg Opinion, Laurent Dandrieu in Le Figaro, Rod Dreher in The American Conservative, Barbara Kay in the National Post, and Rachel Cooke in The Observer.

However, Emily Alford, writing in Jezebel, welcomed the decision. Alford argued that it was disrespectful to sexual abuse survivors for Hachette to publish Allen's book. Alford argued that offering "a 'conflicting point of view' from the same company that, not even a year ago, was championing survivors' stories while promoting Catch and Kill seems willfully, almost cruelly, obtuse." Alford also described Hachette's decision to publish the book without consulting Ronan and Dylan Farrow and Hachette's employees as "bad ethics and bad business". Writing about the controversy in Forbes, Howard Homonoff said, "It's not hard to tag Hachette's efforts here a failure", stating that the company had underestimated the negative social media response to the announcement of the publication. Homonoff also said that having the same company publish both Allen's books and those of his outspoken critic, Ronan Farrow, "looks tone deaf at best".

=== Publication by Arcade ===
The memoir was published in hardcover and e-book on March 23, 2020, by Arcade Publishing, an imprint of Skyhorse Publishing.

Arcade Publishing founder Jeannette Seaver described the book as "wonderful, very well-written, extremely entertaining and so honest". "All you need to do is read the book, and you'll understand everything", she claimed. Of Hachette's decision not to publish the book, she said, "I was so appalled that [Hachette] would drop a man like Woody Allen."

== Translations ==
=== Spanish ===
El Confidencial reported on March 9, 2020, that Allen's Spanish publisher Alianza remained committed to the book's release, despite Hachette dropping the book. The Spanish-language edition, titled A propósito de nada, was published on May 21, 2020.

=== Italian ===
An Italian-language translation was published by La nave di Teseo under the title A proposito di niente on May 14, 2020.

=== French ===
Stock, a French-language subsidiary of Hachette, announced that they planned to publish a French translation of the book (by Marc Amefreville and Antoine Cazé) titled Soit dit en passant (lit. transl. By the way) on May 13, 2020. In an interview with France Inter public radio, Stock's chairman, Manuel Carcassonne, said "Woody Allen is not Roman Polanski...Roman Polanski has acknowledged some of the accusations made against him. This is not at all the case for Woody Allen who has always protested his innocence and proved it in U.S. courts." Asked if he thought that authors signed to Stock might object to the publication, Carcassonne said "I haven't had the chance to warn all of our authors... but I think critics of the book will be satisfied and reassured when they read it." Carcassonne also said he was reassured by the reaction of his all-woman team of editors to reading the book. "Any reticence my own team had, simply disappeared after they had read the book. We're not of the same generation, they're young and are naturally into defending women's rights [but] they were reassured once they'd read it."

=== German ===
A German-language translation was announced by German publisher Rowohlt with the title Woody Allen. Ganz nebenbei. Autobiographie. for publication on April 7, 2020. In an open letter, several German authors published by Rowohlt criticized the company's decision to publish the book without fact-checking first. This includes Giulia Becker, Kirsten Fuchs, Lena Gorelik, Marlene Hellene, Sebastian Janata, Julia Korbik, Sascha Lobo, Anselm Neft, Kathrin Passig, Till Raether, Anna Schatz, Aleks Scholz, Nis-Momme Stockmann, Margarete Stokowski, Sven Stricker.

=== Dutch ===
A Dutch-language translation was announced by Netherlands publisher Uitgeverij Prometheus under the title À propos. for publication on April 7, 2020.

=== Czech ===
A Czech-language translation was published by Argo under the title Mimochodem on March 18, 2021. The translation is by Michael Žantovský, a well-known translator, former Czech Ambassador to the United States and currently director of Vaclav Havel Library.

== Reception ==
Some critics described the book as banal and tone-deaf and criticized its attitude towards women and found it self-pitying, while others praised its humour and easy-going narrative voice.

Writing in The Washington Post, author Monica Hesse panned Allen's "terrible" and "preposterous" memoir, criticizing its "total lack of self-awareness," as well as criticizing Allen for releasing the book during the COVID-19 pandemic.

Peter Biskind of the Los Angeles Times praised Allen's "fusillade of one-liners, two-liners, three-liners" in the book as well as the "vivid detail" about the people Allen has worked with in his film career. Tim Robey of The Daily Telegraph called it a "guilt-inducingly fun memoir," praising the passages about Allen's childhood as well as the "irresistible self-deprecation" Allen employs when detailing his career. Kyle Smith of National Review called the book "an absolute delight, hilarious and endearing and glistening with stardust." In an interview with The New York Times, Larry David called it "a fantastic book, so funny. You feel like you're in the room with him... it's just a great book and it's hard to walk away after reading that book thinking that this guy did anything wrong."

Dwight Garner of The New York Times praised the book for being "occasionally funny" and admired parts of it for showcasing Allen's "authentic and easygoing voice," but criticized it as being "incredibly, unbelievably tone deaf on the subject of women" with Allen's "gratuitous pronouncement" on physical appearance whenever mentioning a woman. Garner also felt the final third of the book "falls apart dreadfully" with Allen's "handing out of goody bags" and the multiple "banalities" he employs when discussing celebrities he has worked with throughout his career. Peter Bart of Deadline Hollywood favorably reviewed Allen's "hilarious" account of his childhood as well as his "superbly revealing analysis" of his film career, but lamented Allen's "baffling and unhinged report of his personal encounters, which reads like a bad parody of a Dostoevsky novel, with subtitles by Freud."
