= Leslee Dart =

American publicist and entrepreneur

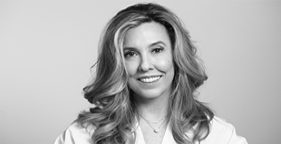
- Photo by Brigitte Lacombe
- Born: Los Angeles, California, U.S.
- Education: BA in Public Relations, School of Journalism
- Alma mater: University of Southern California
- Occupations: Publicist, entrepreneur
- Years active: 1977 - present
- Spouse: Michael Leon
- Children: Adam Leon (stepson), Matthew Leon
- Awards: Women in Communications Matrix Award for excellence in Public Relations

Leslee Dart is an American publicist and entrepreneur. She is the founder and co-CEO of the Dart Group, now known as 42West, which prior to its 2017 acquisition was the largest independently-owned public relations firm in the entertainment industry.

Dart's work has been focused on both actors and filmmakers since the start of her career. She has represented actors including Meryl Streep, Nicole Kidman, Daniel Day-Lewis, Tom Hanks, and Jessica Lange, and directors Martin Scorsese, Francis Ford Coppola, Jonathan Demme, Mike Nichols, and Sydney Pollack. Dart directed the publicity campaigns for the Academy Award-winning films Lincoln, No Country for Old Men, The Departed and Chicago, among others. Her longtime work with Woody Allen became a source of controversy in the wake of his alleged sexual abuse.

== Early life and education ==
An only child, Dart was born and raised in Los Angeles. She attended the University of Southern California, where she initially studied fine arts. After her father suggested she consider journalism or public relations, she enrolled at the USC School for Communications. She graduated with a degree in public relations in 1976.

== Career ==
=== Academy of Motion Picture Arts and Sciences, Rogers and Cowan ===
Dart worked briefly in corporate PR after her graduation, first as an in-house publicist, and later on behalf of corporate clients at an agency. In 1977, she was hired by the Academy of Motion Picture Arts and Sciences. While working on the Academy Awards, she met Warren Cowan, the co-founder of Rogers & Cowan. A "mastermind of the modern day Oscar campaign," he incorrectly assumed Dart had established relationships and hired her on the spot. Dart was mentored by Cowan as well as Sam Cohn, who would later introduce her to directors.

=== PMK ===
At 28, Dart partnered with Pat Kingsley and Lois Smith to form the PR agency PMK, the successor to Smith and Kingley's firm Pickwick/Maslansky/Koenigsberg. She moved from Los Angeles to New York to head the New York office of PMK in 1983, and became an owner of the company with Kingsley and Smith in 1985. During her 23-year tenure at the agency, it became the leading PR firm in entertainment. Revenue increased from $1.5 million to $14 million annually, as the PMK roster grew to more than 200 clients. In 2001 a photo of Dart, Kingsley and Smith ran in the "Legends of Hollywood" issue of Vanity Fair with the caption "Not since the heyday of MGM have three little letters wielded so much power." In 2004, The New York Times wrote: "With the explosion in media interest in celebrity over the last decade, publicists have become a power center in their own right. For many years, Ms. Kingsley, based in Los Angeles, and Ms. Dart, her New York-based partner in privately held PMK, were indisputably the most influential among them."

PMK was sold to advertising company Interpublic in 1999, and its focus shifted away from Hollywood talent toward high-paying corporate clients. Dart brokered partnerships with brands such as Coca-Cola and General Motors, but said in a 2004 interview with Newsweek that her "passion" was always for filmmakers and talent. As the concentration on brands intensified, Kingsley and Dart became increasingly estranged. In November 2004, Kingsley fired Dart, then the president of PMK, stating that her contract would not be renewed. It was reported that Dart's dismissal was based on a protracted power struggle, a "succession drama" between Kingsley, then 72, and Dart, more than 20 years her junior. Dart's termination and the resulting departure of talent from PMK was a major media story, with New York writing that "the ultimate test for any publicist is spinning her own dismissal, and this Leslee Dart has done masterfully."

=== The Dart Group, 42 West ===
The weekend after she was fired from PMK, Dart established the Dart Group, working with one assistant from a midtown Manhattan hotel room. The filmmakers and actors who left PMK for the Dart Group included Demme, Hanks, Jessica Lange and Mike Nichols. In 2006 the Dart Group was renamed 42 West. As the company expanded, its roster grew to include musicians. It was acquired in March 2017 by Dolphin Digital Media.

Dart joined the Board of Directors of 42 West's parent company, Dolphin Entertainment, in June 2020 and currently serves as its Strategic Advisor. She stepped down from 42 West in July 2020.

== Woody Allen controversy ==
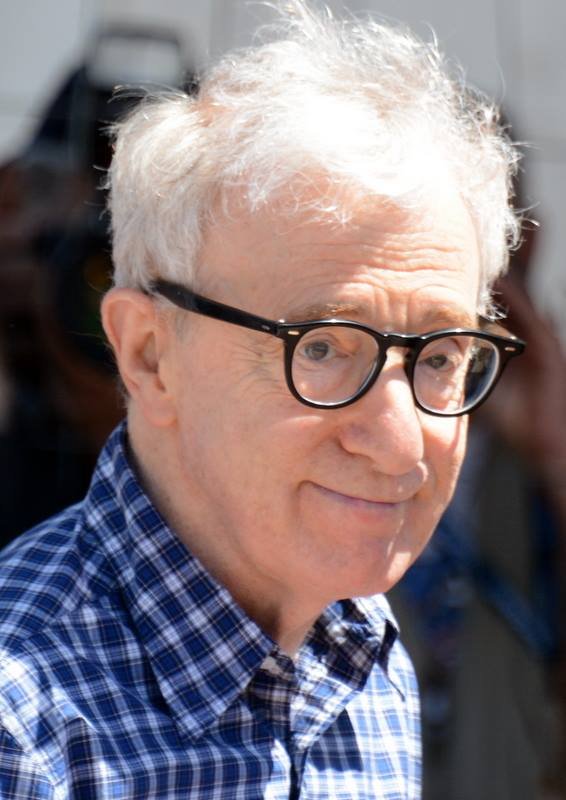
Allen at the 2015 Cannes Film Festival

Dart became known for "not only for promoting clients who wanted coverage, but also for protecting those who did not." This included film director Woody Allen, who faced allegations of sexual assault by his adoptive daughter. Variety wrote: "Even the efforts of Allen’s longtime publicist, Leslee Dart, to counter the initial tide of negative stories itself became a news item." In addition to print and broadcast media, her attempts to spin the story were covered in Kirby Dick's and Amy Ziering's Allen v. Farrow, which explored the sexual abuse allegations against Allen.

== Recognition ==
Dart received the Matrix Award for Women in Communications in 2009. She has appeared on the Crain's list of the "Most Powerful Women in New York", Nikki Finke's list of the most influential women in TV and film for Elle, the Hollywood Reporter "Women in Entertainment Power 100," the PR Week "Power List," the Variety Women's Impact Report, and New York magazine's "Most Influential People in Movies". In 2015, 20 years after she orchestrated Hugh Grant's mea culpa on the Tonight Show following his arrest for lewd conduct; The Independent wrote that it was "the greatest PR save of all time."

== Personal life ==
Dart and her husband, Michael Leon, were married in 1996 and had two sons, Matthew and Adam, a director and screenwriter. Michael Leon died in 2023.

Dart supports organizations including Planned Parenthood and causes related to environmental protection and LGBTQ rights.
