= Monument to Woody Allen =

Urban sculpture in Oviedo, Spain

Coordinates: 43.36298°N 5.849638°W

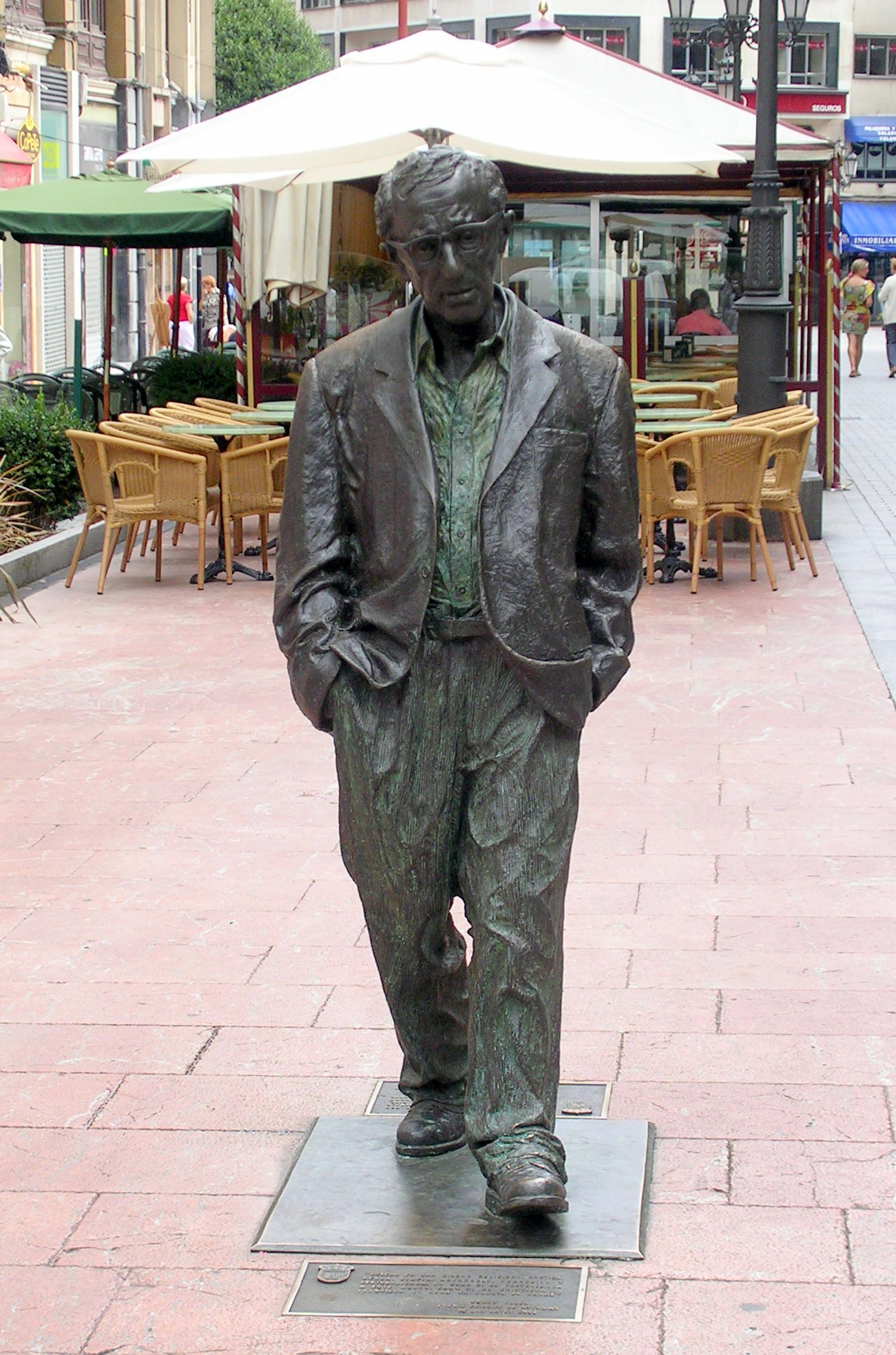
The monument in 2005

The Monument to Woody Allen (Spanish: Monumento a Woody Allen) is a life-size bronze sculpture of the American actor, writer and director Woody Allen, situated in the Spanish city of Oviedo.

== Background and description ==
The statue was designed by Vicente Santarúa and installed in 2003 by mayor Gabino de Lorenzo. El País remarked that "It looks like he is walking with a sad face and his mind somewhere else, not in Oviedo right now, although if you put yourself to his side and start a conversation with him it is so realistic that it looks as if he would answer you". Allen had travelled to the city in 2002 to accept a Prince of Asturias Award. His 2008 film Vicky Cristina Barcelona was partially set there.

In front of the statue there is a plaque with Allen's description of Oviedo, reading in Spanish "Oviedo is a delicious city, exotic, beautiful, clean, pleasant, calm and pedestrianised, like it does not belong to this world, as if it didn't exist... Oviedo is like a fairy tale".

Oviedo has been noted for its statues, with the city containing over a hundred outdoor sculptures.

== Vandalism and controversy ==
In its first year on public display, the statue was vandalised twice, including the glasses being broken in December 2003. The city council said in 2008 that regular occurrences of vandalism meant that the glasses would only be repaired once a year. Returning to the city in December 2005, Allen joked that he would speak to the mayor about the vandalism.

In January 2018, the Asturias Feminist Organisation called for the statue to be removed, owing to the allegations of sexual abuse against its subject. In his 2020 autobiography Apropos of Nothing, Allen remarked that a "hate-driven mob" might pull down the statue.

== Gallery ==
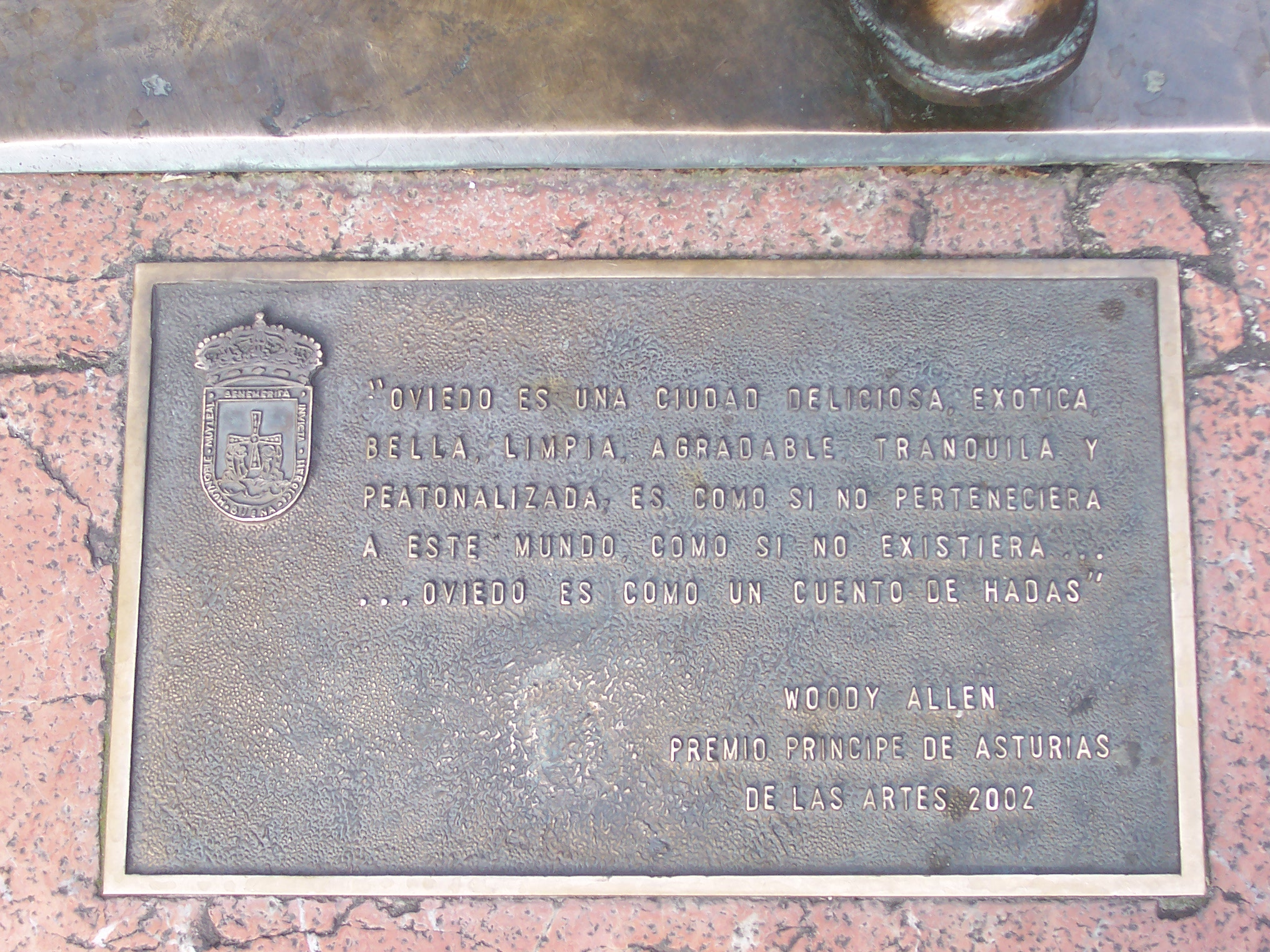
Plaque, with Allen's description of Oviedo

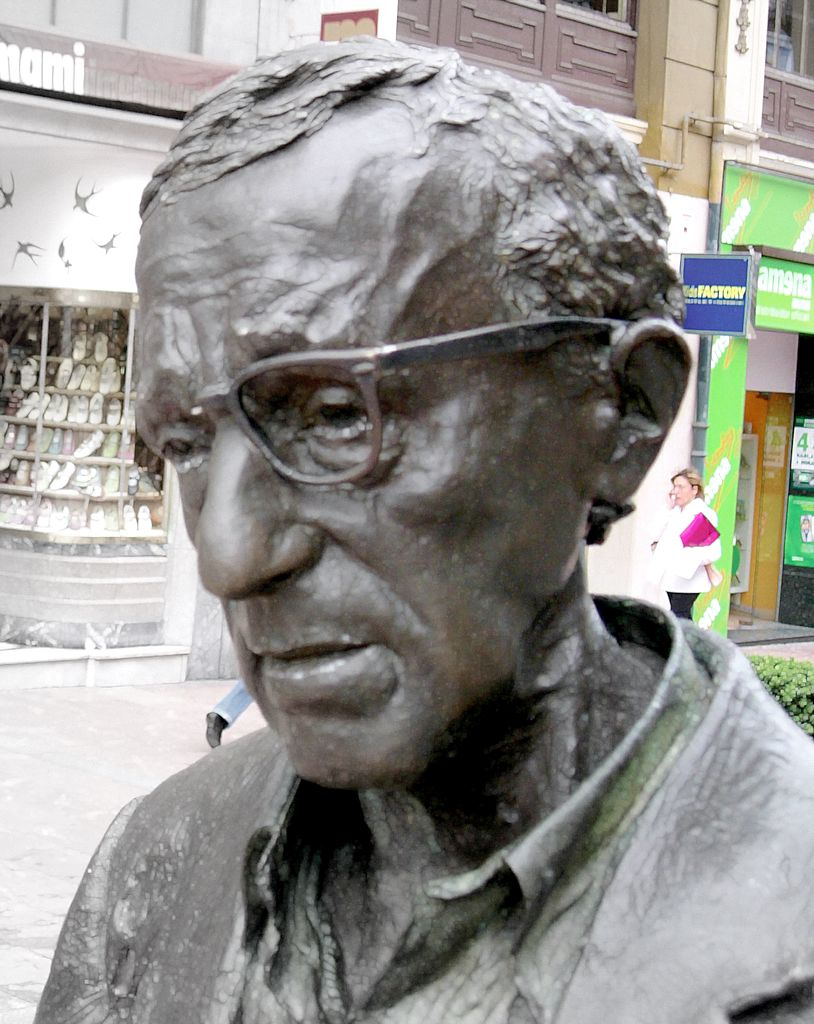
Detail of face, 2005. Note the partial destruction of the subject's glasses
