= Gabino de Lorenzo =

Gabino de Lorenzo Ferrera (born 14 February 1943) is a Spanish former politician. As a member of the People's Party, he was a member of the city council in Oviedo from 1987 to 2012 and the mayor from 1991 to 2012. He was the government delegate to Asturias from 2012 to 2018.

== Biography ==
Born in Oviedo, de Lorenzo was educated by the Marists and earned a degree and a doctorate from the Escuela de Minas de Oviedo. He worked as a mining engineer for Ensidesa before entering politics, and was elected to Oviedo's city council in 1987 as leader of the People's Party (PP) list. His first mandate as mayor in 1991 came with the support from the Democratic and Social Centre (CDS), and his next five were with absolute majority, while his last in 2011 required the support of the Asturias Forum.

De Lorenzo came into office with a 3.2 billion Spanish pesetas (around US$32 million) budget left by his predecessor Antonio Masip Hidalgo, and spent freely on projects including the pedestrianisation of the city centre and the construction of new neighbourhoods. In 1995, with a large majority, he planned to raise taxes to maintain the level of spending, but this was stopped by protests. During the 1990s, he initiated the expropriation of the Villa Magdalena mansion, which after a lengthy legal battle cost taxpayers €63 million. He successfully fought to stop his alma mater from being moved to Mieres.

During his time in office, de Lorenzo promoted opera and zarzuela, and brought musical acts such as Michael Jackson, U2 and Julio Iglesias to Oviedo. In 2003, he inaugurated a monument to American actor Woody Allen, a frequent visitor to the city.

On 5 January 2012, de Lorenzo resigned as councillor and mayor upon being appointed government delegate to Asturias for the incoming national government of Mariano Rajoy. On 22 March 2018, having turned 75, he retired.
