= New York Woman =

American women's magazine

- Categories: Woman's magazine
- First issue: September–October 1986; 40 years ago
- Final issue: 1992
- Country: United States
- Based in: New York City
- Language: English
- ISSN: 0888-9775

New York Woman was a magazine that blended features on fashion and the arts, literary and humorous essays, and consumer-oriented services pieces such as reviews of restaurants, shops or films. Its target audience was intelligent women living in the New York Metropolitan area. It was launched as a bimonthly by the Esquire Magazine Group Inc. in 1986. The first issue was published in September–October of that year. The mergers-and-acquisitions specialist Bruce Wasserstein of Wasserstein Perella reportedly brokered the magazine's sale to American Express Publishing, publisher of Travel + Leisure and Food & Wine.

New York Woman's founding publisher was Julie Lewit-Nirenberg, who was later the founding publisher of Mirabella, often referred to as a smart woman's fashion magazine. Later she was a director of special projects at Conde-Nast.

The magazine's founding editor was Betsy Carter (who went on to work for O, The Oprah Magazine, Oprah Winfrey's magazine).

The French graphic designer Fabien Baron used his creative director position at the magazine as an opportunity to further develop relationships with important clients in the fashion business such as Barneys and Calvin Klein. After leaving New York Woman, Baron continued to earn accolades for his fashion-oriented work in advertising and for magazines such as Harper's Bazaar.

Writers included the playwright Wendy Wasserstein, the Andy Warhol superstar Viva, the sociologist Barbara Ehrenreich, the comedy writer Merrill Markoe, the actress Theresa Meeker and Maureen Orth, who later wrote for Vanity Fair magazine.

New York Woman ceased publication in 1992.
