= Lena Gorelik =

German writer

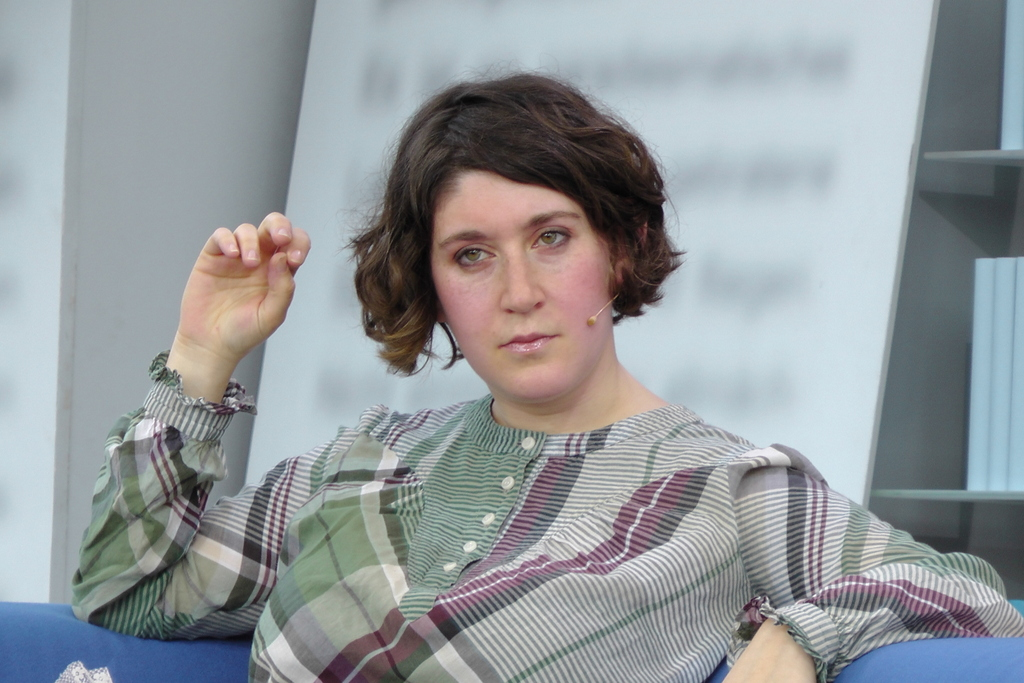
Lena Gorelik (2012)

Lena Gorelik is a German writer. In 2009, she received the Ernst-Hoferichter Prize.

== Biography ==
She was born in St. Petersburg in 1981 in a Russian-Jewish family. Her family immigrated to Germany in 1992 as quota refugees. She studied at the German School of Journalism in Munich and then took a two-year interdisciplinary Master's course in Eastern European studies at LMU Munich.

Her first novel, Meine weißen Nächte (My White Nights) was published in the autumn of 2004, and was acclaimed by Bücher as "the best new book about Germany – an absolutely charming book", while the Süddeutsche Zeitung wrote that "'My White Nights' proves that new German literature can possess both levity and gravitas." In 2005, the book won the Bavarian Culture Prize in the category of literature. Her second novel Hochzeit in Jerusalem (Wedding in Jerusalem) was published in spring 2007, and was nominated for the German Book Prize 2007. She was honored for her work with the Ernst-Hoferichter Prize in 2009 and a series of other awards.

In 2006, she completed her Master's thesis "Jews – Russians – Germans. The Perceptual Change of Russian Jews in the German Media 1989–2006 Against the Background of German-Jewish Relations".
