= Moses Farrow =

Korean-American adoptee (born 1978)

- Born: Moses Amadeus Farrow; January 27, 1978 (age 48); Seoul, South Korea
- Other name: Misha Farrow
- Education: Siena College (BA); University of Connecticut (MA)
- Occupations: Family therapist; photographer; activist
- Years active: 2000–present
- Parents: Mia Farrow (adoptive mother); Woody Allen (adoptive father)
- Website: mosesfarrow.com

Moses Amadeus Farrow (born January 27, 1978) is an American family therapist. The adopted son of actress Mia Farrow and director Woody Allen, he has come to the defense of his father against a sexual abuse allegation.

== Early life and education ==
Moses Amadeus Farrow was born in South Korea with cerebral palsy. He was adopted by American actress Mia Farrow in 1980 and by film director Woody Allen in December 1991. He had a small role in Allen's 1986 film Hannah and Her Sisters.

Farrow attended the Dalton School in New York City. He received his undergraduate degree from Siena College and his master's degree from the University of Connecticut.

== Relationship with Woody Allen and Mia Farrow ==
On August 13, 1992, Allen sued for custody of Moses Farrow, who was called to submit written testimony by Mia Farrow's attorneys. In a letter addressed to Allen and read to the court, Moses, then 14, declared that he did not consider Allen his father anymore. In subsequent media interviews, Moses told reporters that he was "sure my younger brother and sister don't want to go with him either". In 2018, Moses called this public denouncement of his father "the biggest regret of my life".

Mia Farrow was ultimately granted custody of Moses and attempted to have Allen's adoption of Moses annulled, but a court denied her request.

As an adult, Moses Farrow reunited with Allen and severed ties with Mia Farrow. In a February 2014 People magazine interview, he defended Allen and rejected his sister Dylan Farrow's public accusations of child sexual abuse against Allen, saying: "I don't know if my sister really believes she was molested or is trying to please her mother. Pleasing my mother was very powerful motivation because to be on her wrong side was horrible." Also in that interview, he called Mia Farrow "vengeful" and said that being raised by her was "horrifying". Moses has said that he experienced years of physical abuse by Mia Farrow.

In 2018, Farrow published a blog post, "A Son Speaks Out", in which he argued for Allen's innocence, said Mia Farrow abused him, and told the story of his childhood in his own words.

In a December 2020 interview with The Guardian, Farrow said he would be happy to take Allen's surname.

Footage of Farrow appears in the documentary Allen v. Farrow even though he declined to participate, citing its bias toward Mia's narrative.

== Career ==
Farrow has been a licensed marriage and family therapist in Connecticut since 2007. He specializes in adoption trauma therapy, especially for children adopted by parents of a different racial group.

== Personal life ==
Farrow lives with his family in Connecticut.
