= Amy Herdy =

American film producer

Amy Herdy is a film producer. She won a 2018 George Polk Award, for her Netflix documentary, The Bleeding Edge.

== Life ==
Amy Herdy was a crime reporter at The St. Petersburg Times and The Denver Post. She was an investigative producer at KUSA-TV.

From 2006 to 2010, she served as an instructor for the school of journalism at the University of Colorado, Boulder.

Herdy has served as a producer, researcher, and investigator on the documentaries The Hunting Ground (2015), The Bleeding Edge (2018), On the Record (2020), and Allen v. Farrow (2021), all directed by Kirby Dick and Amy Ziering.
