= Soon-Yi Previn =

Third wife of Woody Allen (born 1970)

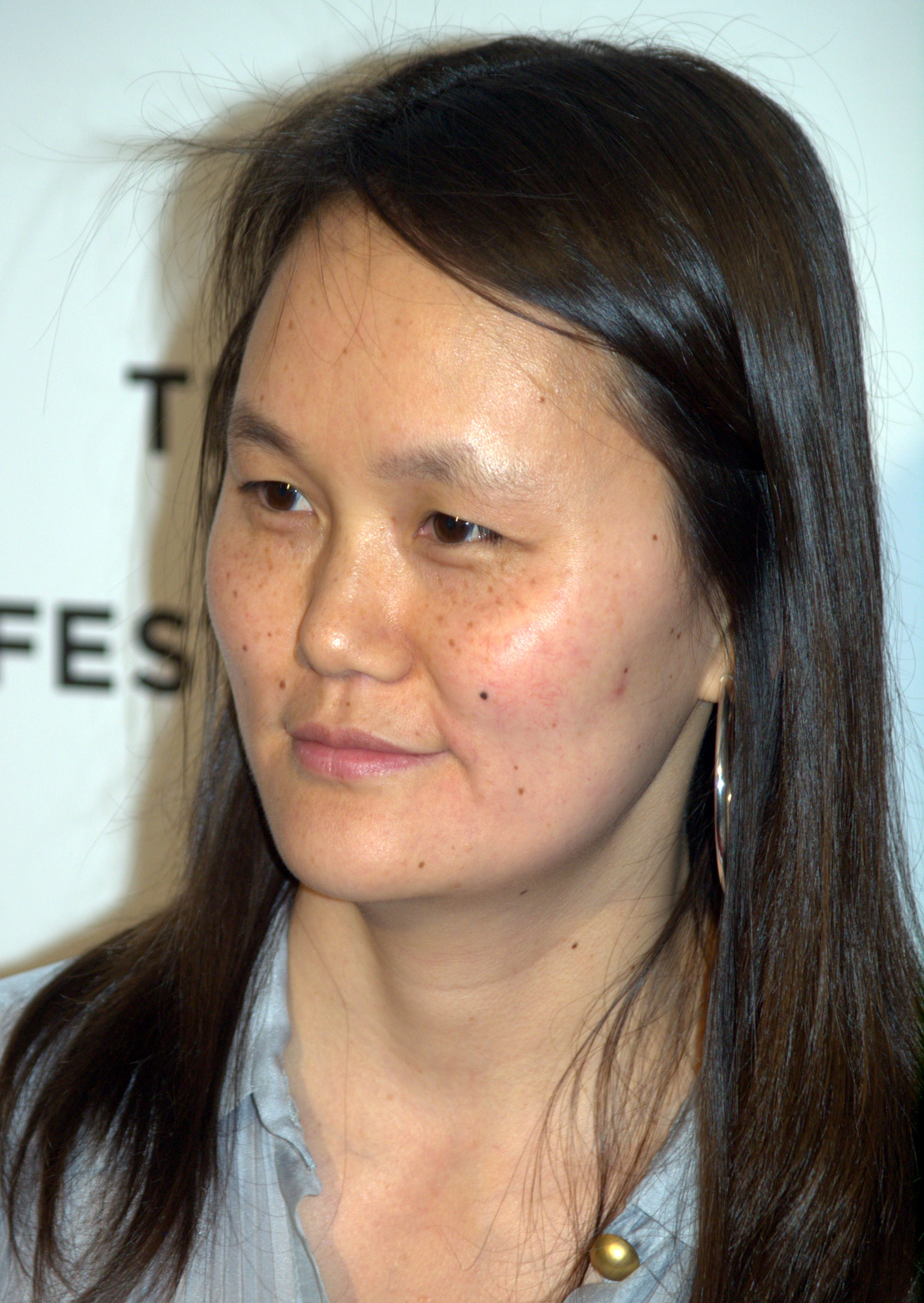
- Previn in 2009
- Born: Oh Soon-hee c. October 8, 1970 (age 56); Seoul, South Korea
- Education: Drew University; Columbia University
- Notable credit: Wild Man Blues
- Spouse: Woody Allen (m. 1997)
- Children: 2
- Parents: Mia Farrow (adoptive mother); André Previn (adoptive father)

Korean name
- Hangul: 오순희
- RR: O Sunhui
- MR: O Sunhŭi

Soon-Yi Previn (/ˈprɛvɪn/; born Oh Soon-hee, Korean: 오순희; c. October 8, 1970) is the third wife of filmmaker Woody Allen and the adopted daughter of actress Mia Farrow and musician André Previn. Her romantic relationship with Allen created public controversy when it became known in 1992, when Allen was 56 and Previn was 21; Allen had been the long-term partner of Previn's adoptive mother, Farrow. Previn married Allen in 1997.

== Early life, education, and career ==
Soon-Yi Previn was born Oh Soon-hee in South Korea. She was reportedly found abandoned in Seoul, South Korea, on February 12, 1976. At that time, she was unable to speak intelligibly. She was temporarily placed in Maria's House, a local institution. When authorities failed to locate her parents or relatives, they placed her in St. Paul's Orphanage. The Seoul Family Court established a Family Census Register (legal birth document) on her behalf on December 28, 1976, giving her a birth date of October 8, 1970. Her actual birth date is unknown. Previn has said that as a young child, she lived on the streets and obtained food from trash cans.

In 1978, Mia Farrow and her then-husband, André Previn, adopted Previn and took her to the United States. At the time, U.S. law allowed two visas per family for international adoption, and the couple had already adopted Vietnamese infants Lark Song Previn and Summer "Daisy" Song Previn. Farrow asked her friends Rose and William Styron to request that U.S. Representative Michael J. Harrington sponsor a private bill to authorize Previn's adoption. This bill, HR 1552, was passed as Private Law 95-37 on May 15, 1978, paving Previn's way to immigrate to the United States.

Just after the adoption, Farrow wrote to Nancy Sinatra about Previn, saying, "Now she speaks English and is learning to read, write, play piano, dance ballet & ride a horse". Farrow later said that at the time of her adoption, Previn had learning disabilities. Rose Styron is Previn's godmother.

Farrow's marriage to André Previn ended in 1979. In 1980, Farrow began a long-term relationship with filmmaker Woody Allen. Allen later adopted two of Farrow's adopted children: Dylan Farrow and Moses Farrow. Allen's adoption of Dylan and Moses was finalized on December 17, 1991. Farrow and Allen also became the biological parents of a son, Satchel Ronan O'Sullivan Farrow (later known simply as Ronan Farrow), on December 19, 1987.

Previn graduated from Marymount School of New York in 1991. After a summer as a sales associate at Bergdorf Goodman, she began her freshman year as a commuter student at Drew University in Madison, New Jersey, in September 1991. Previn graduated from Drew in 1995 with a degree in Art and earned a master's degree in special education from Columbia University in 1998. She has taught fourth grade at the Spence School, a private school in Manhattan.

In 1992, Previn said that Farrow had physically abused her. In 2018, Previn's brother, Moses Farrow, confirmed that Farrow had abused Soon-Yi, and said that he had been physically abused by Farrow as well.

=== Acting ===
During her teens, Previn made an uncredited appearance in Allen's Hannah and Her Sisters (1986), which starred Farrow. She appeared as an extra in Paul Mazursky's 1991 film Scenes from a Mall, which starred Allen. She also appeared alongside Allen in the documentary Wild Man Blues (1997).

== Personal life ==
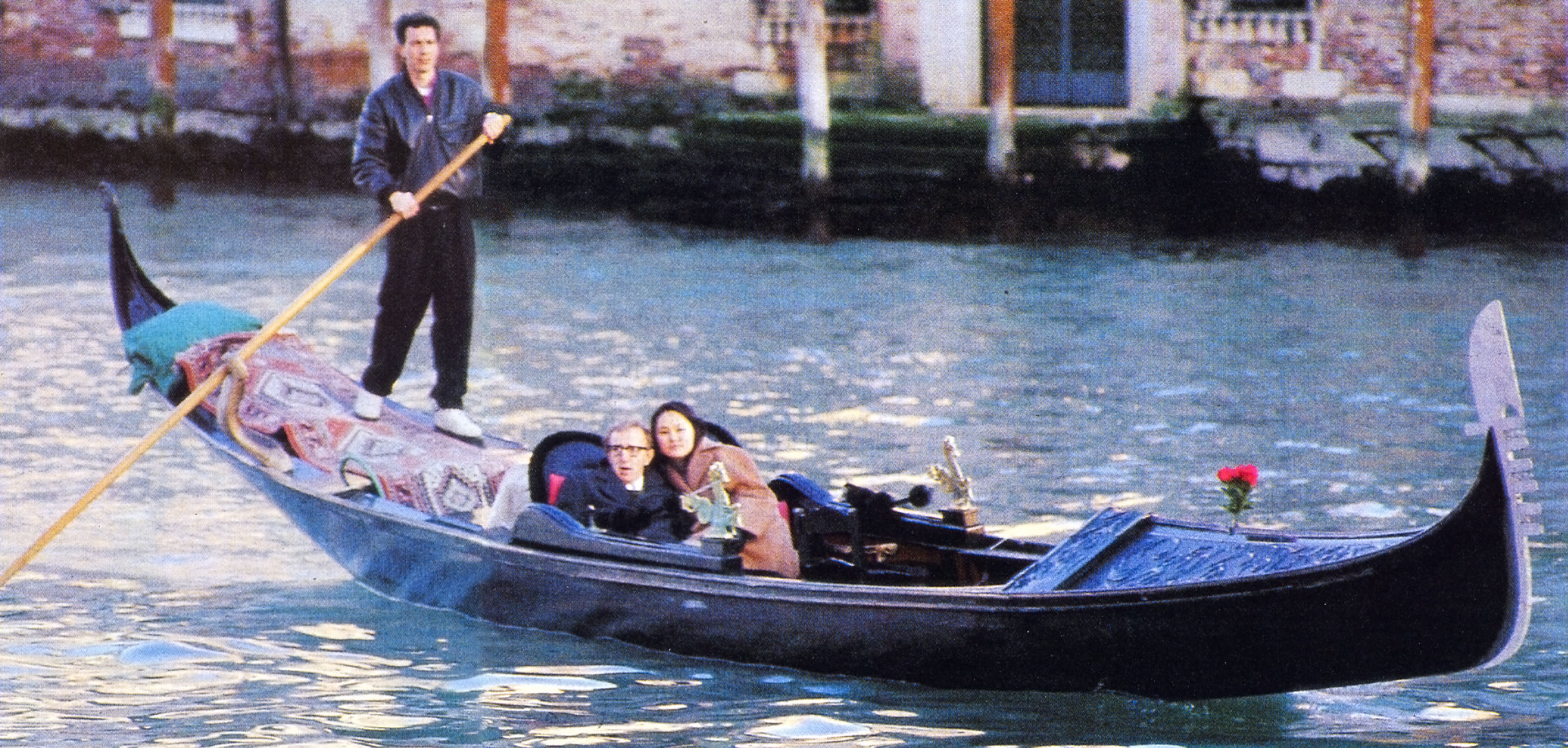
Woody Allen and Previn on a gondola in Venice in 1996

Previn has said that Woody Allen "was never any kind of father figure" to her and that she "never had any dealings with him" during her childhood, when Allen was dating Mia Farrow. A judicial investigation carried out during the custody trial between Farrow and Allen determined that before 1990, Previn and Allen had rarely spoken to each other. According to Previn, her first friendly interaction with Allen took place when she was injured playing soccer during 11th grade (1989-1990) and Allen offered to transport her to school. After her injury, in 1990, Previn began attending New York Knicks basketball games with Allen. A judicial investigation from the Farrow–Allen custody trial concluded that Allen and Previn began a sexual relationship in December 1991. As Allen and Farrow had never married, and as Allen had never adopted Previn, their relationship was not illegal.

In January 1992, Farrow found nude photographs of Previn in Allen's home. Allen, then 56, told Farrow that he had taken the photos the day before, about two weeks after he and Previn first had sex. At the time, Previn was a first-year student at Drew University. Farrow said she broke off her relationship with Allen in 1992 upon discovering his affair with Previn. Previn and Allen initially contended that Allen and Farrow were no longer together when Farrow discovered the photos of Previn. Allen later said that at the time his relationship with Previn began, he was "still in some version of a relationship with" Farrow but that they were just "going through the motions".

Allen has called his relationship with Previn a "fling" that developed into a more significant relationship. In a 2018 interview, Previn said, "From the first kiss I was a goner and loved him". On August 17, 1992, Allen issued a public statement that he was in love with Previn. Previn was surprised by his declaration: "I only knew that he loved me when he gave the press conference and said it publicly. Even then, I wasn't sure if he meant it. We had never said those words to each other".

Previn's relationship with Allen became a "huge scandal". Their relationship was a catalyst for "tabloid headlines and late-night monologues in August 1992", in part due to the allegation that Allen had sexually abused Previn's adoptive sister, Dylan Farrow.

Previn and Allen married in Venice on December 22, 1997; she was 27 and he was 62. They have adopted two daughters together. According to her longtime friends, Previn has devoted herself to being a wife and stay-at-home mother. The Previn–Allen family resides on Manhattan's Upper East Side.

As of 2021, Previn remained estranged from Mia Farrow.

Previn and Allen knew financier and sex offender Jeffrey Epstein socially before his 2019 suicide. As part of the February 2026 document release related to the U.S. Department of Justice's investigation of Epstein, it was found that Previn wrote Epstein an email in 2018 saying that the #MeToo movement "went too far". She also condemned the underage victim of former Congressman Anthony Weiner, to whom Weiner had sent several sexually explicit text messages, writing: "I hate women who take advantage of guys and she is definitely one of them. She knew exactly what she was doing and how vulnerable he was and she reeled him in like fish to bait. What is her excuse for being a despicable and disgusting person who preys on the [weak]?" Also included in the cache of documents was a series of emails showing that Epstein helped Allen's and Previn's daughter Bechet get into Bard College by connecting her to the school's president, Leon Botstein, a longtime acquaintance.
