= Woody Allen sexual abuse allegation =

Dylan Farrow's accusations of Woody Allen sexually abusing her

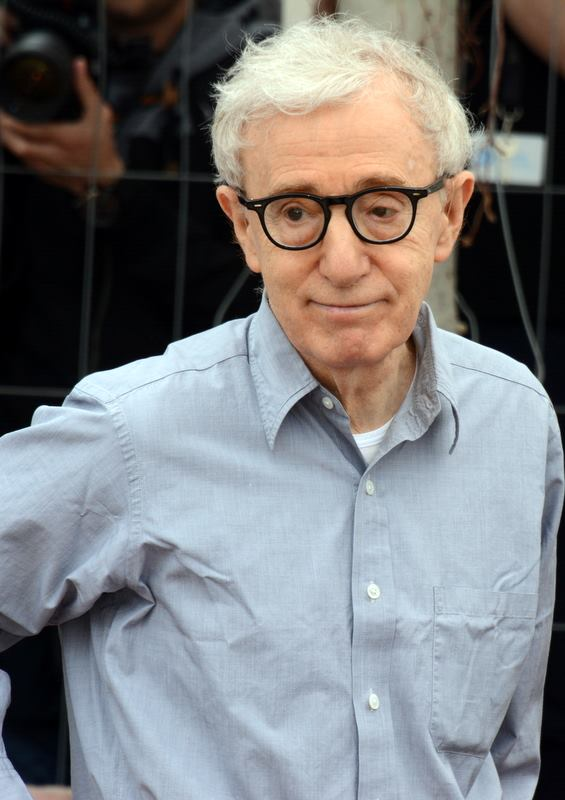
Allen in 2016

In August 1992, American filmmaker and actor Woody Allen was alleged by actress Mia Farrow to have sexually molested their adoptive daughter Dylan Farrow, then aged seven, in Mia Farrow's home in Bridgewater, Connecticut. Allen has repeatedly denied the allegation, which was investigated and dismissed by both the judge in the custody case and New York Social Services. In Connecticut it was investigated without charges being filed. A prosecutor, Litchfield State's Attorney Frank Maco, said he believed Allen molested Dylan but decided against charging him to avoid a traumatic trial for her. In 2021 Maco reaffirmed that he still believes Dylan Farrow's allegations.

Allen and Mia Farrow were in a romantic relationship beginning in 1980. They had three children together: two adopted, Dylan and Moses, and one biological, Satchel (now known as Ronan Farrow). The sexual abuse was alleged to have taken place eight months after Farrow learned that Allen and Soon-Yi Previn, whom Farrow adopted with her former husband André Previn, had begun a sexual relationship in December 1991. Allen has alleged that his relationship with Previn prompted Farrow to concoct the molestation allegation as an act of vengeance. Mia Farrow has steadfastly denied coercing Dylan into lying about abuse and later won custody; Dylan Farrow has also denied she was coached.

The Connecticut State's Attorney investigated the molestation allegation but did not press charges, saying a trial would be "questionable" and "fertile ground for defense attacks" and citing the New York Supreme Court's decision to not give credence to the allegation. During the investigation the Connecticut State Police referred Dylan to the Child Sexual Abuse Clinic of Yale–New Haven Hospital, which concluded that Allen had not sexually abused Dylan. The New York Department of Social Services found "no credible evidence" to support the allegation. In response to the allegation, Allen sued Farrow for sole custody of Dylan, Satchel, and Moses. He lost the case in June 1993, though the judge agreed that the allegation of sexual abuse had not been proven and the preponderance of the evidence indicated no abuse. Visitations with Dylan were to be resumed within six months, as soon as Dylan had recovered from what she had suffered during the initial custody case, while Allen was given limited, supervised visitation with Satchel; Moses, a teenager, was allowed to decide for himself. The decision was upheld on appeal in 1994 and 1995.

Dylan has repeated the allegation several times as an adult, although with modifications of Mia's 1992 narrative. Her first public comment was in an interview with Maureen Orth for Vanity Fair in 2013, followed by an open letter in the New York Times in 2014 and a Los Angeles Times op-ed in December 2017. Allen has also spoken publicly about the allegation, in a New York Times op-ed and in 2018 in a statement to CBS News, each time denying it, and referring to the conclusions of multiple judicial investigations that exonerated him. Mia has been accused of child abuse by two of her children, Moses and Soon-Yi, who have also accused her of false allegations and of "brainwashing" Dylan. In a 2018 letter posted online, Moses, who was 14 at the time of the allegations, wrote that he felt a responsibility "as the man of the house" to watch Dylan and others carefully the afternoon she was allegedly molested, and explained why he believes the allegation is false. He tweeted, "So many times I saw my mother try to convince her that she was abused—and it has worked." Ronan Farrow, now an investigative journalist, has consistently maintained that he believed his sister and has been vocal in his criticism of how the media and Hollywood have handled the allegations.

== Background ==
=== Allen and Farrow ===
Woody Allen and Mia Farrow began a romantic relationship in 1980. Farrow also starred in 13 of his films. They maintained separate apartments in Manhattan throughout their relationship—Farrow on Central Park West and Allen on Fifth Avenue—and did not marry; both had been married twice before.

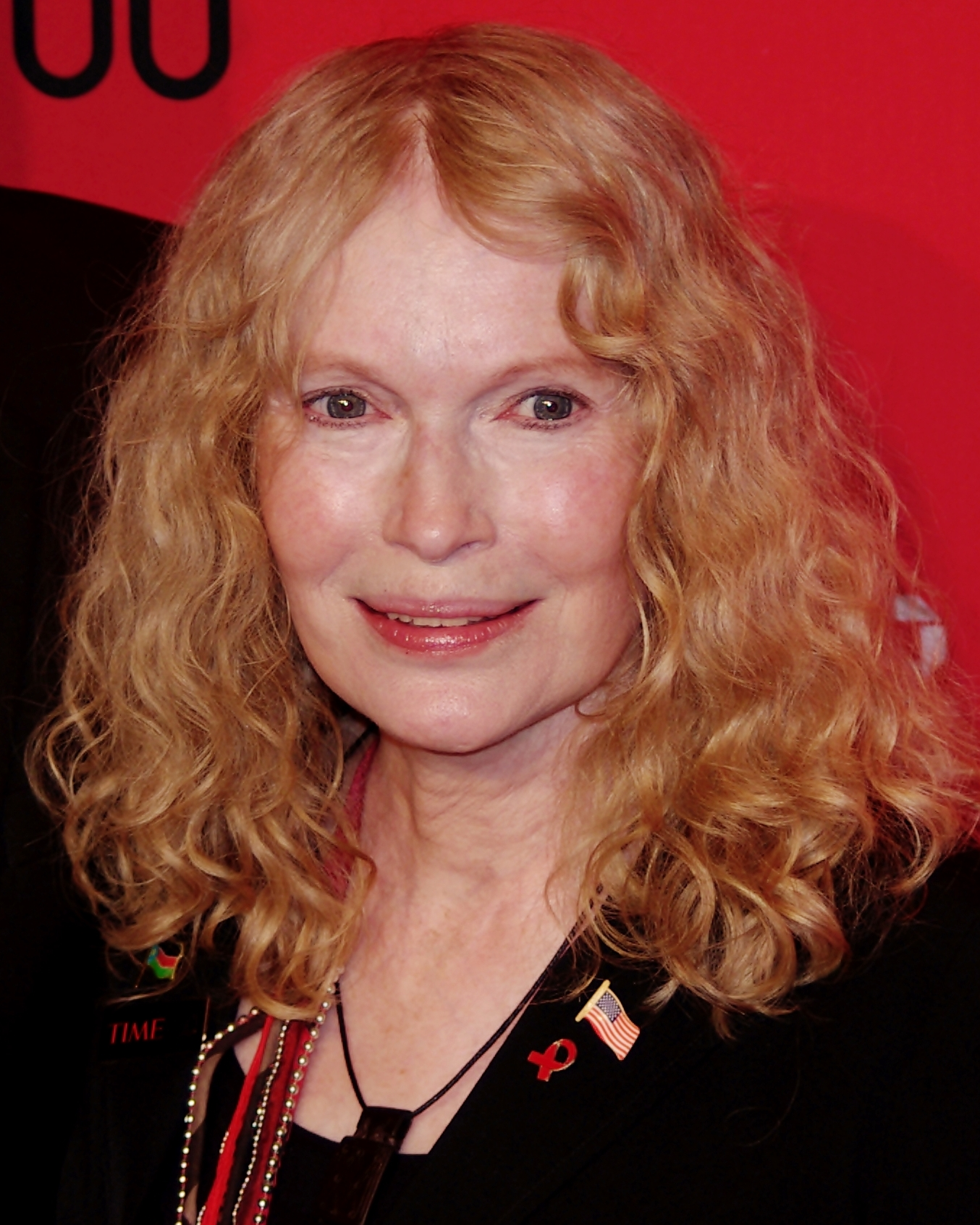
Mia Farrow, 2012

When the relationship began, Farrow had seven children: three biological sons from her marriage to composer André Previn; three adopted girls (two Vietnamese and one Korean, Soon-Yi Previn); and one adopted Korean boy, Moses. In July 1985 she adopted Dylan Farrow from Texas. Allen was not involved in the adoption, but when Dylan arrived he assumed a parental role with her and began spending more time in Farrow's home. He and Farrow went to Europe several times with the Farrow–Previn children between 1987 and 1989, although the judicial investigation concluded that "he remained aloof from Ms. Farrow's other children except for Moses, to whom he was cordial."

In December 1987 Farrow gave birth to Allen's biological son, Satchel (later known as Ronan Farrow). Farrow wanted to adopt another child in 1991; Allen said he would not take "a lousy attitude toward it" so long as she agreed to his adoption of Dylan and Moses, and in October that year she adopted another Vietnamese child. (Note: Farrow found that the child was too disabled and needed more care than she could provide; she helped to find him another family.) Allen's adoption of Dylan and Moses was finalized on December 17, 1991.

External images
- On holiday, Leningrad, 1987; Left to right: Ronan, Lark, Woody Allen, Dylan, Fletcher, Daisy, Soon-Yi Previn, Moses, and Mia Farrow.
- Allen, Farrow and Soon-Yi Previn, c. 1987.

According to her testimony during the custody trial, Farrow became concerned about Allen's behavior toward Dylan in 1987–88. She reportedly told Allen that he was giving Dylan too much attention and failing to give her "breathing room". Allen had allegedly read to Dylan while in his underwear, allowed her to suck his thumb, and would sit on her bed in the morning waiting for her to wake up. On one occasion, Dylan allegedly locked herself in the bathroom for four hours when Allen arrived; he had an employee pick the lock with a coat hanger. Farrow later testified that she found Allen's relationship with Dylan at this time "relentless and overpowering", with "a wooing quality"; but in 1990 she changed her will so that in the event of her death Allen would have custody of her minor children (Dylan, Satchel and Moses). Furthermore, in 1991, she made an affidavit to the judge promoting Allen's adoption of Dylan and Moses, praising especially Allen's qualities as Dylan's father: "Mr. Allen is a loving, caring, attentive parent to Dylan and she can only benefit from having him as an adoptive father".

Farrow testified that she told her therapist that she feared Allen "would abuse Satchel" and that she worried that Allen had a sexual relationship "with another man". The family psychologist, Susan Coates, witnessed some of Allen's behavior and testified during the 1993 custody trial that she saw it not as sexual but as "inappropriately intense because it excluded everybody else". Farrow had instructed babysitters not to be alone with Allen. Allen later said he had given Dylan extra attention to compensate for the time Farrow was spending with the newborn Satchel. Journalist Maureen Orth wrote in Vanity Fair that Allen agreed in 1990 to discuss the issue in "counseling", but at the trial Coates testified that Allen was not in therapy with her and that her contact with both parents was part of their children's therapy. Coates praised Allen's commitment to fathering and desire to improve as a father, but he was not in therapy for inappropriate behavior with Dylan or for any other problems.

=== Relationship with Previn ===
According to Allen, he began a romantic relationship with Soon-Yi Previn in late December 1991. In August 1992, Farrow told her lawyer, Alan Dershowitz, that Previn had told her that her relationship with Allen had begun on December 1, 1991. Later, Farrow alleged that the relationship began while Previn was in her final year of high school, from which she graduated in June 1991. Farrow also alleged that Dylan saw Allen and Previn on a bed together in the summer or autumn of 1991. During the Farrow-Allen custody battle, an appellate court found that the sexual relationship between Allen and Previn had begun in December 1991. The timing of the relationship was relevant in part because Farrow unsuccessfully attempted to have Allen's adoption of Dylan and Moses voided after the molestation allegation on the grounds that his relationship with Previn had begun before the adoptions were finalized on December 17, 1991.

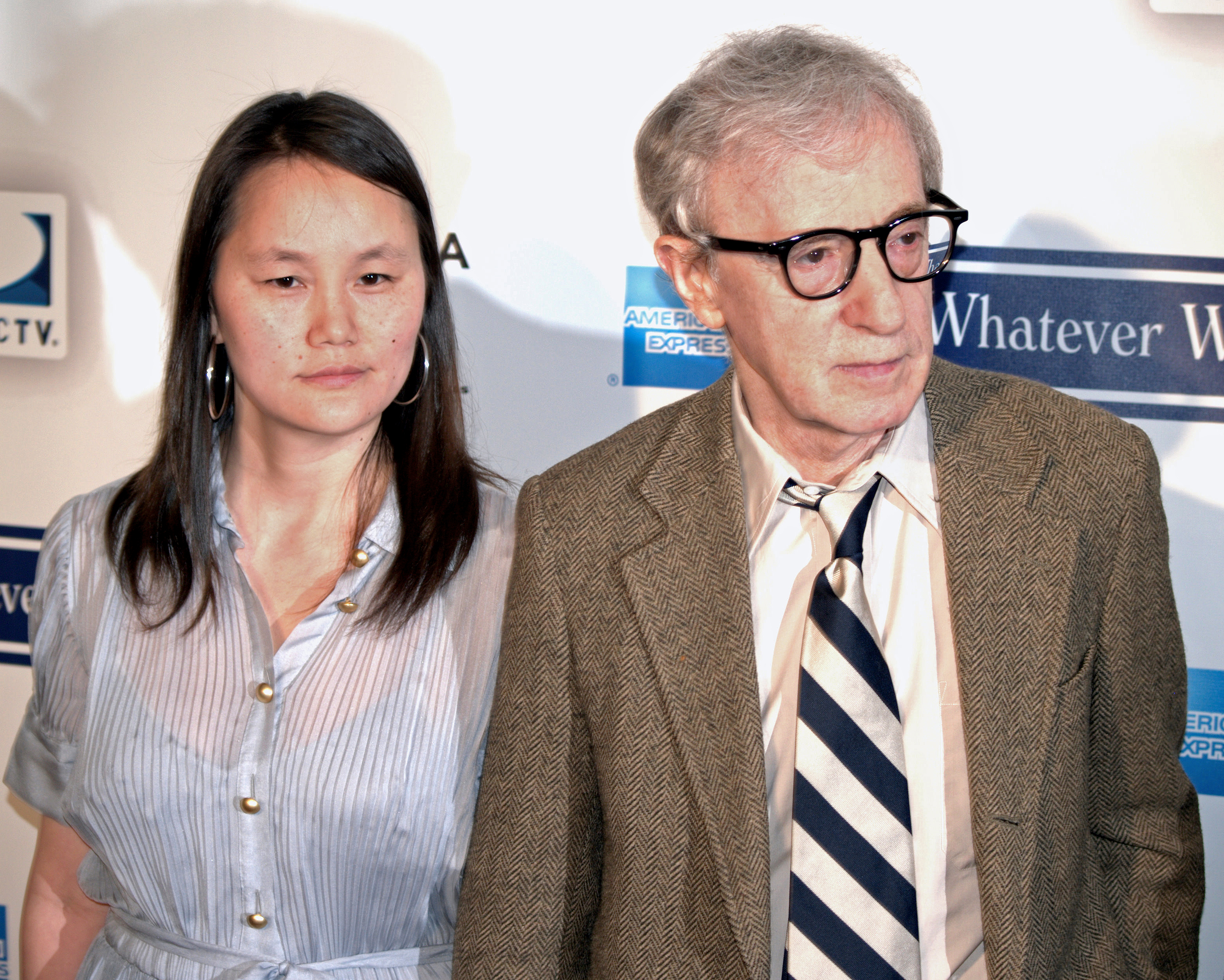
Soon-Yi Previn and Woody Allen, 2009

On January 13, 1992, Farrow found nude Polaroid photographs of Previn on the mantel in Allen's home. At the time, Previn was a first-year student at Drew University. Allen, then 56, told Farrow that he had taken the photographs the day before, and that he and Previn had first had sex in the last week of December 1991. Allen told a court in 1993 that he regarded the images as erotic but not pornographic; the appellate court said that it did not "share Mr. Allen's characterization" of the photographs.

The discovery shocked the family, but Farrow did not stop Allen from visiting her home and she completed her work on Husbands and Wives (1992), the last film of his in which she appears. According to Farrow, Allen said his relationship with Previn was over. Farrow said that Allen asked her to issue a joint press release confirming that there was no relationship between Allen and Previn and that she refused.

Allen and Previn remained in contact; in July 1992 she lost her job as a summer camp counselor in Maine after spending too much time on the telephone with a "Mr. Simon", who turned out to be Allen. Allen said that when he visited Connecticut to celebrate Dylan's birthday, Farrow left a note on a door in which she called him a "child molester [...] now focused on youngest daughter", meaning Dylan. On August 1, 1992, according to Coates's testimony, Farrow telephoned Coates to say she had learned that Soon-Yi and Allen were still in a relationship; Farrow was distressed and told Coates that, just a week earlier, she and Allen had talked about getting married. "Ms. Farrow described Mr. Allen as 'satanic and evil'", Coates said, adding that Farrow pleaded with her to "find a way to stop him".

Allen publicly announced his relationship with Previn on August 17, 1992. Later that month, Previn said that Allen had never been a father figure to her and that they had become friendly long after his romance with Farrow had ended. Allen later acknowledged "that at the time he was 'still in some version of a relationship with' Farrow even though they had 'just been going through the motions'". As Allen and Farrow had never married, and as Allen had never adopted Previn, the relationship between Allen and Previn was not illegal.

Allen's relationship with Previn became a scandal. It catalyzed "tabloid headlines and late-night monologues in August 1992", in part due to the allegation that Allen had sexually abused Dylan Farrow.

Allen married Previn in Venice on December 23, 1997.

== Allegation ==
On August 4, 1992, Allen visited his children at Farrow's country home in Connecticut while Farrow and a friend went shopping with the two most recently adopted children, Tam and Isaiah. Farrow and Allen were to sign an agreement on August 6 that Allen would pay $6,000 a month for the support of Dylan, Satchel and Moses; Martin Weltz, Farrow's lawyer, said that on August 4 Farrow called him to suspend the processing of the agreement.

Present in the house once Farrow had left were Dylan; Satchel; Farrow's babysitter, Kristie Groteke; the children's French tutor, Sophie Berge; Farrow's friend's three children; and Farrow's friend's babysitter, Alison Stickland. When Farrow left the house Moses was, according to her, "off by himself taking a walk". Moses claims he was in the house when Allen arrived. The day after the visit, Stickland told her employer that she had seen Allen kneel on the floor in front of Dylan, then aged seven, with his head in her lap facing her body; she testified to that effect during the custody trial. Dylan allegedly told Farrow what had happened and that she had not liked it; Farrow telephoned her attorney for guidance and was advised to take Dylan to her local pediatrician. Farrow took Dylan to Vadakkekara Kavirajan, Farrow's regular pediatrician, to whom the girl did not make any report of abuse.

According to the expert Farrow hired, Farrow had videotaped Dylan answering her questions before the second visit to the pediatrician; Dylan had made the allegation of abuse "in fits and starts", and in a way that "set a tone for a child about how to answer"; and Dylan told Farrow that she had been with Allen in the attic and that he had touched her private parts. The next day, they returned to see Kavirajan, and Dylan repeated the allegation. Kavirajan then informed authorities, although he said he found no physical evidence of sexual molestation. Kavirajan later told an interviewer that he was "required by state law" to report any allegations of child abuse. Susan Coates informed Allen of the allegation during one of the sessions in which he was participating in Satchel's therapy; he responded, "I'm completely flabbergasted", repeating it several times.

== Legal action ==
=== Custody proceedings and statements ===
Farrow hired attorney Alan Dershowitz to propose to Allen that they resolve the matter without any public disclosure. Allen rejected the proposal.

On August 13, 1992, a week after being told about the allegation, Allen began proceedings in New York Supreme Court for sole custody of Dylan, Moses, and Satchel. Farrow's mother, the actress Maureen O'Sullivan, issued a statement on August 15 that was critical of Allen and said Farrow had retained Dershowitz. Two days later, Allen released his first public comment about his relationship with Previn: "Regarding my love for Soon-Yi: It's real and happily all true. She's a lovely, intelligent, sensitive woman who has and continues to turn around my life in a wonderfully positive way."

On August 18 Allen held a news conference at the Plaza Hotel. Calling the molestation allegation "an unconscionable and gruesomely damaging manipulation of innocent children for vindictive and self-serving motives," he alleged that, during a meeting on August 13, Farrow's lawyers had demanded between $5 million and $8 million in "hush money". Dershowitz responded that the lawyers had suggested Allen pay a lump sum in child support, rather than a monthly one, to reduce Allen's interaction with Farrow. It would be $17,000 a month until each child reach the age of 21, $900,000 for college tuition and $2,500,000 for Farrow herself as compensation for her loss of income for the next 10 years. Allen's lawyers declared that Farrow's proposal was that in exchange for the money she would drop the charges of sexual abuse. Dershowitz flatly denied this, saying he was trying to reach an agreement that would allow the matter not to be made public and convince police in Connecticut that it was best not to intervene and "decriminalize" the case, and that the proposal was completely separate and independent of the economic proposal. On August 20 Allen's publicist announced that Allen had passed a lie detector test. The following day, in an interview with Walter Isaacson of Time magazine, Allen called the nude photographs of Previn a "lark of a moment". Of the relationship, he said: "I didn't feel that just because she was Mia's daughter, there was any great moral dilemma. It was a fact, but not one with any great import."

During the fall of 1992, the Connecticut State Police interviewed Dylan using anatomical dolls. The last of the interviews took place on December 30, 1992, during which Dylan inserted the penis of the male doll into the vagina of the female doll. When the police asked her why she knew that the dolls fit like that, she told them that during the summer Satchel and she had witnessed how Allen introduced his penis into Soon-Yi's vagina. "Daddies do not do this", she told them, according to the statement, and "daddies are not supposed to act like boyfriends." Eleanor Alter disclosed this in the course of a court hearing about Allen's visitation rights during the processing of the procedure. The session was suspended due to the seriousness of the allegation.

Between September and November 1992, Dylan was interviewed by specialists from Yale New Haven Hospital. One of the aspects these sessions explored was the relationship between boyfriends and girlfriends. In November 1992 that relationship consisted for Dylan in "kisses and hugs." The judicial investigation concluded that the sexual relationship between Soon Yi and Allen began in December 1991. Allen denied Dylan's allegations that she had witnessed him and Previn having sex in the summer of 1991, insisting that their sexual relationship didn't begin until December. Allen also attacked Farrow, stating, "I think that when Mia needs something, she takes our daughter and makes her say it."

Allen and Farrow reached an agreement according to which Allen would not begin visits with Dylan immediately and Farrow would provide a therapist for her.

=== Yale–New Haven Hospital team ===
On August 17, 1992, the Connecticut State Police announced that they were investigating the molestation allegation. In September the police referred Dylan to the Child Sexual Abuse Clinic of Yale New Haven Hospital. The main questions were whether Dylan was telling the truth and whether she was sexually abused. Frank Maco, State's Attorney for the Litchfield district, declared in 1997 that he asked the Child Sexual Abuse Clinic to evaluate whether Dylan would make a viable witness. The clinic's professionals met with the police and Maco for preliminary information. Between September 18 and November 13 they conducted nine separate interviews with Dylan and her mother. On October 14 they interviewed Groteke, and between November 17 and January 7 they had three interviews with Allen. Finally, they met with Farrow to review the recording she had made of Dylan between August 5 and 6. Berge, the other nanny present on August 4, was also interviewed, as were the two psychotherapists treating the children, Coates and Nancy Schultz. The Child Sexual Abuse Clinic medical director, Dr. John M. Leventhal, signed the team's report while Dylan was interviewed by the social workers. Completed in March 1993, the report concluded: "It is our expert opinion that Dylan was not sexually abused by Mr. Allen." (Note: Yale–New Haven Hospital Child Sexual Abuse Clinic (1993): "It is our expert opinion that Dylan was not sexually abused by Mr. Allen. Further, we believe that Dylan's statements on videotape and her statements to us during our evaluation do not refer to actual events that occurred to her on August 4th, 1992 [...] In developing our opinion we considered three hypotheses to explain Dylan's statements. First, that Dylan's statements were true and that Mr. Allen had sexually abused her; second, that Dylan's statements were not true but were made up by an emotionally vulnerable child who was caught up in a disturbed family and who was responding to the stresses in the family; and third, that Dylan was coached or influenced by her mother, Ms. Farrow. While we can conclude that Dylan was not sexually abused, we can not be definite about whether the second formulation by itself or the third formulation by itself is true. We believe that it is more likely that a combination of these two formulations best explains Dylan's allegations of sexual abuse.")

The team had proposed the study as an attempt to corroborate or refute some of these basic hypotheses:

1. That Dylan's allegations were true and Allen had sexually abused her.
2. That Dylan's statements were not true, but had been made by an emotionally vulnerable minor trapped in a disturbed family situation as a response to stress.
3. That Dylan had been instructed or influenced by her mother on what to say.

The team concluded Dylan had not been sexually abused, and it deemed the best explanation for the allegation a combination of the two remaining hypotheses.

The team members were Leventhal; Dr. Julia Hamilton, who was also a social worker and co-director of the Yale Medical Center Child Abuse Program; and social worker Sawyer, who had a master's degree in social work and ten years of experience. The social workers met Dylan in Yale New Haven every Friday for an hour or so. Groteke was interviewed for three hours. According to the report, the inconsistencies in Dylan's statements, the lack of spontaneity, and the impression of repeating something learned were the main reason for the conclusions. The report also stressed that Dylan felt that she had to solve her mother's problems, and indicated that the relationship between Farrow, Dylan and Satchel was very disturbed and required immediate intensive psychotherapy. The team destroyed the original notes when incorporating their content into the report. The report was immediately sent to the state police, who informed Farrow that day and two days before Allen was informed. Maco told a reporter in 1997 that Yale "took the case and ran away with it."

=== Custody trial ===
==== Testimony ====
The custody hearings began on March 19, 1993, in State Supreme Court in Manhattan, and ended on May 4. Journalists were allowed in court but television cameras and microphones were not. Taking the stand on the first day, Allen said the allegation was Farrow's vengeance for his romantic relationship with Soon-Yi, which he had not intended to be "anything but a private thing"; he had hoped Farrow would not find out about it. He described her anger when she did.

New York State Supreme Courthouse

Groteke, Farrow's babysitter, testified in April that for about 15–20 minutes on the afternoon in question, she had not been able to find Dylan or Allen in the house; she had assumed they were outside with the other children. Allen said he had gone to the bathroom during the disputed period. Berge testified that she had noticed Dylan was wearing no underwear under her dress that day. Another Farrow nanny, Monica Thompson, who was not present in the house on that day, told Allen's lawyers in two affidavits in February 1993 that she had felt pressured by Farrow to support the allegation. Thompson said that Groteke had also had reservations; according to Thompson, Groteke told her, days after the allegation was made, that she "did not have Dylan out of her sight for longer than five minutes. She did not remember Dylan being without her underwear." Groteke acknowledged that she had had that conversation, but admitted only to telling Thompson that she did not remember having lost sight of Dylan. Thompson, who had been Dylan's nanny since the girl was two months old, also said that the charges Farrow brought against Allen were "not true". Mavis Smith, Farrow's housekeeper of 13 years, said she thought Allen was a good father and that she had never seen Allen doing anything sexual with Dylan or Satchel.

Coates testified that Farrow had been so angry with Allen when she discovered his relationship with Previn that Coates had feared for Allen's safety. Farrow and Allen hired Schultz in April 1991 because the child "lived in her own fantasy world". Schultz testified that Dylan had become "absorbed in what the fantasy is [and] that it became real". Neither Coates nor Schultz believed sexual abuse had occurred. One of Allen's lawyers alleged that Farrow's lawyers had suggested "the charges could be made to go away" if Allen agreed to pay around $7 million. Dershowitz, representing Farrow, said there had been an "exploratory" session to attempt mediation. "To have this described as an extortionate meeting is ridiculous," he said. He added that Allen's lawyers were "trying to set a trap, the trap failed and now they testify as if the trap succeeded". One of Allen's lawyers acknowledged when cross-examined that the discussion about money related mostly to the children's education and medical care, as well as money owed for Farrow's film work for Allen. Levett, Farrow's lawyer, acknowledged that he suggested various amounts to reach an agreement "for child support, including household help: $17,000 a month until the youngest of the children turned 21, roughly $2.5 million factoring in inflation and interest. For tuition, assuming all three went to college: $800,000 to $900,000. Plus unspecified medical and, yes, psychiatric expenses. There might be a damage claim for Dylan, who had accused her father of molesting her. And some compensation for Mia Farrow, who'd earned $300,000 a year for her roles in Allen's annual films and was entitled to that sum for five to ten years now that she was out of a job." Dershowitz echoed Levett's testimony, but said that a proposal was made to intercede in the child-abuse investigation in favor of a private settlement. He added that the offer "was not premised on any payments." On October 14, 1992, Dershowitz told interviewer Charlie Rose: "I don't think it ever had to come out. If he [Woody Allen] had not filed that suit, I don't think anybody would know the story today and I think it would be resolved quietly behind the scenes."

Leventhal testified by deposition on April 20, 1993. Citing inconsistencies in Dylan's account, he said that once the hypothesis that Dylan's narrative corresponded to events that actually happened was discarded, the Yale New Haven team "had two hypotheses: one, that these were statements that were made by an emotionally disturbed child and then became fixed in her mind, and the other hypothesis was that she was coached or influenced by her mother. We did not come to a firm conclusion. We think that it was probably a combination." Farrow and Allen both hired expert witnesses to discuss the report. Anne Meltzer, a forensic psychologist, testified for Allen that the report had "reached conclusions that were supported well by the data they collected." She said the tape of Dylan making the allegation was "flawed" because it had been filmed by one side and not by a professional. Stephen Herman, a child psychiatrist, testified for Farrow that the report was "seriously flawed", and that he could find no evidence of a thought disorder in Dylan's statements, but that the report was not biased and that, in light of the evidence, he could not reach any conclusion about the allegation of abuse. To Charles Patrick Ewing and Joseph McCann, the most damaging criticism of the report was that the team had destroyed its notes from the interviews it conducted, which meant the court could not test the validity of the report's conclusions; they write that forensic experts have an obligation to retain their notes for review. Another criticism was that the team was unwilling to testify in court, except via Leventhal's deposition. Herman also recognized the tape of Dylan making the allegation was flawed because it was made in a way that "set a tone for a child about how to answer". He also concluded that there was no point to evaluating Dylan again about the allegation.

All the psychiatric experts who testified in the trial agreed that Allen was able to play a beneficial role in Dylan's therapy.

==== Decision ====
In his 33-page decision in June 1993, Justice Elliott Wilk rejected Allen's bid for custody of the three children and rejected the allegation of sexual abuse. Wilk denied Allen immediate visitation rights with Dylan, saying of Allen's behavior toward Dylan that it was "grossly inappropriate and that measures must be taken to protect her" while pointing out that Allen's inappropriate behavior was not sexual in nature. Rejecting Allen's portrayal of Farrow as a "woman scorned", Wilk said there was no credible evidence that she had coached Dylan, although the videotape she made of Dylan compromised the investigation of sexual abuse, and criticized Allen for his "trial strategy" of turning family members and employees against one another. The Yale New Haven team's unwillingness to testify in court, except through Leventhal's deposition, together with the destruction of its notes, had rendered its report, he wrote, "sanitized and, therefore, less credible". Wilk called the case "frivolous" and ordered Allen to pay Farrow's costs. Regarding the allegation of abuse, Wilk concluded that the evidence did not support that it had occurred, although he was not sure that the evidence demonstrated conclusively that it had not. Wilk did not order a new battery of forensic testing with Dylan because all the experts had agreed with the limited report's conclusions and because it would not, after the period of time elapsed, be beneficial or provide useful information.

=== Criminal inquiry, social services ===
The Connecticut State Police interviewed Allen in Litchfield in January 1993 for over three hours. He said he had never been in the attic crawl space; when the police said they had taken fingerprints in there, he said it was possible that his prints were there. The forensic specialist chief of Connecticut's state crime laboratory, Henry Lee, said that what police had found in the crawl space was hair fibers and that the evidence could not place Allen in the attic. On September 20 that year, Frank Maco, accompanied by a female police detective, talked to Dylan; in 1997, Maco told a reporter, "I saw complete withdrawal any time I tried to discuss the incident."

On September 24, 1993, Maco held a news conference to say that he would not pursue the molestation allegation, despite having probable cause, citing a desire not to traumatize Dylan. In the prosecution's official statement of decision , Maco acknowledged that even in the case of custody and with a more favorable standard of proof for the accusation than "beyond a reasonable doubt", it had been impossible to conclude that the abuse had occurred. He also said that the nature of the evidence was fertile ground for the defense and "would not have the same probative as it did in the New York Supreme Court custody case" and that he considered his duty "to avoid the unjustifiable risk of exposing a child to the rigors and uncertainties of a questionable prosecution".

In a letter to the New York Department of Social Services, Allen's psychotherapist Kathryn Prescott said that his psychological profile "was definitely not that of a sexual offender" and also said, "There has never been any suggestion that Mr. Allen was suffering from a sexual perversion / deviant sexual behavior." The New York Department of Social Services closed its own 14-month investigation in October 1993; its letter to Allen stated: "No credible evidence was found that the child named in this report has been abused or maltreated. This report has, therefore, been considered unfounded."

Allen filed complaints with the Connecticut Criminal Justice Commission and the statewide bar counsel over Maco's statement about probable cause. The former dismissed the complaint in November 1993. In February 1994 the statewide Grievance Committee ruled that, while Maco had not violated the state's code of conduct for lawyers, his statement was cause for "grave concern". In addition, Maco had sent a copy of his statement to the judge who was deciding whether to overturn Allen's adoption of Dylan and Moses. That act was "inappropriate, unsolicited and potentially prejudicial", the panel ruled.

=== Allen's appeals, other legal action ===
In December 1992 Farrow began a legal action to have Allen's adoption of Dylan and Moses voided. Her position was based in part on her view that Allen's romantic relationship with Previn had begun before the adoption was finalized on December 17, 1991. Allen said the sexual relationship had started in the last week of 1991. He offered not to appeal the custody ruling if Farrow dropped her attempt to have his adoption of Dylan and Moses voided, but she refused. Farrow's attempt to void the adoption failed.

In January 1994, Allen appealed in the Appellate Division of the New York trial-level courthouse (not the Court of Appeals) Judge Elliott Wilk's decision.

Of the molestation allegation, the appellate court wrote, "the evidence in support of the allegations remains inconclusive", that its "review of the record militates against a finding that Ms. Farrow fabricated the allegations without any basis" and explicitly corrected Wilk by writing that the Yale–New Haven team's view that Dylan had a tendency to "withdraw into a fantasy" and that she had given inconsistent accounts had to be taken into account. As elements suggesting that the abuse could have occurred but were insufficient for this conclusion to be more likely than the contrary, the court listed "the testimony given at trial by the individuals caring for the children that day, the videotape of Dylan made by Ms. Farrow the following day and the accounts of Dylan's behavior toward Mr. Allen both before and after the alleged instance of abuse." The court was critical of Allen's parenting skills and relationship with Previn. Allen's appeal failed, though two of the five judges said the visitation rights regarding Satchel were too restrictive. Allen appealed again in the Appellate Division of the New York trial-level courthouse, and in July 1995 the Appellate Division upheld the original decision.

== History of statements ==
=== 1992: Soon-Yi mentioning Mia's violence ===
Soon-Yi wrote in 1992 that Allen was never a father figure to her, but just a "man who happens to be the ex-boyfriend of Mia ... Mia was always very hot-tempered and given to rages which terrified all the kids. They can't speak freely because they're still dependent on her. But they could really tell stories and I'm sure one day will. It's true Mia was violent with me and I have conclusive proof, but I hope she and Woody can somehow head off a custody trial."

=== 1997: What Falls Away ===
In Mia Farrow's 1997 memoir, What Falls Away, Farrow repeated the accusation that Allen had sexually abused Dylan. The allegation was mentioned in several of the book's reviews.

=== 2013: Dylan goes public ===
Dylan's first public comment was in an interview with Maureen Orth for Vanity Fair in 2013.

=== 2014: Ronan's tweets and Dylan's open letter ===
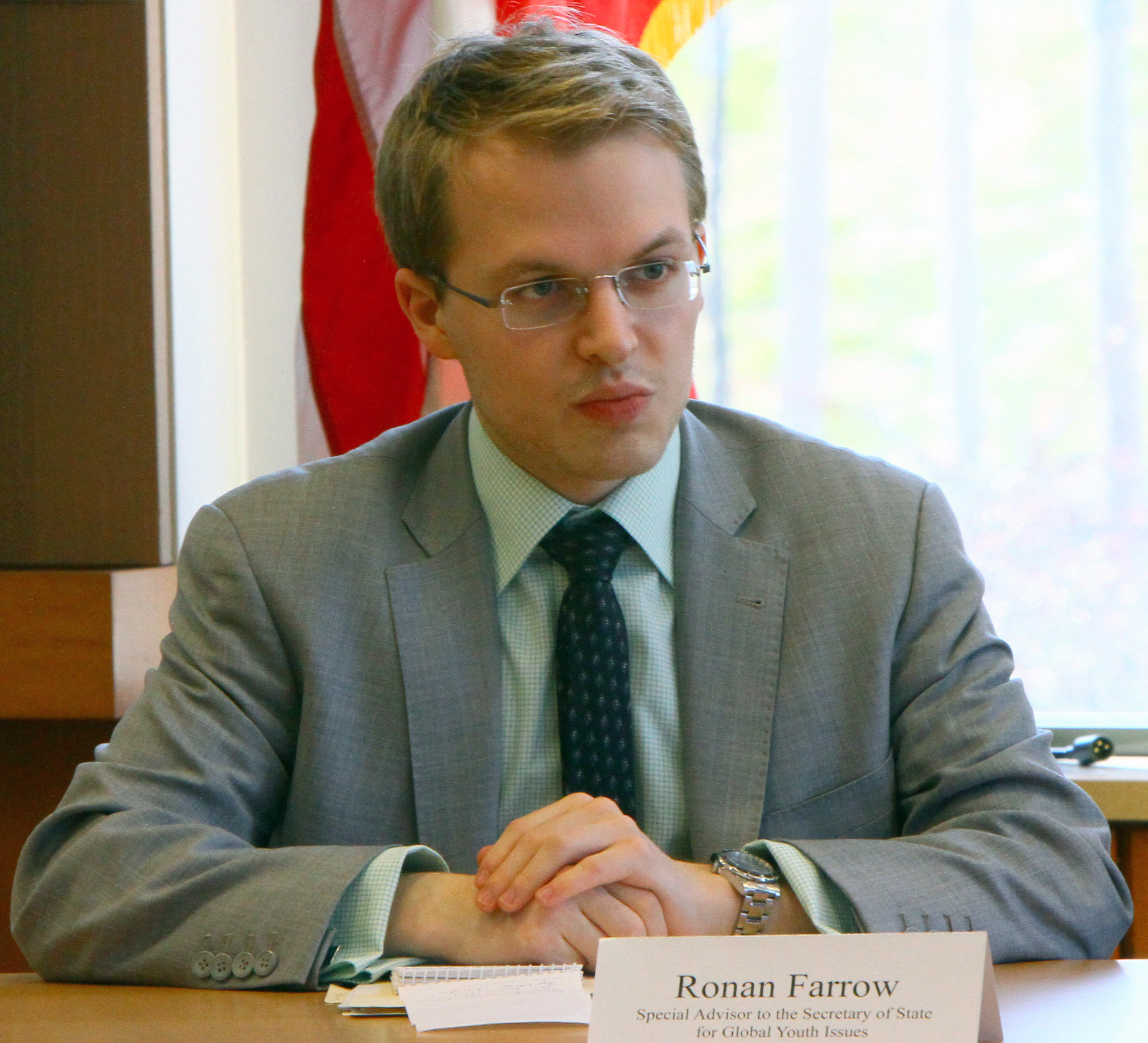
Ronan Farrow, 2012

When Allen won the Golden Globe Cecil B. DeMille Award in January 2014, Farrow and Satchel (now going by the name Ronan Farrow and working as a journalist) tweeted objections. Dylan, then 28, repeated the molestation allegation the next month in an open letter on the New York Times blog of Nicholas Kristof, a family friend. Writing that Allen had made her feel uncomfortable "for as long as [she] could remember", she alleged, for example, that he would get into bed with her in his underwear and that she would hide to avoid him. She wrote that when she was seven years old, Allen told her "to lay on my stomach and play with my brother's electric train set. Then he sexually assaulted me." Allen called the allegations "untrue and disgraceful" and responded with an op-ed in the Times. Ronan noted that the Times allowed Dylan's open letter 936 words on Kristof's blog while Allen's op-ed was twice as long and published in the print edition.

Ronan, aged four in 1992, has been critical of Allen for several years; in 2011 he tweeted, "He's my father married to my sister. That makes me his son and his brother-in-law. That is such a moral transgression." In The Hollywood Reporter in May 2016, he wrote that, after Dylan's open letter was published, his colleagues had forwarded him the daily emails "blasted out by Allen's powerful publicist", with an open cc list, offering talking points for reporters and the names of friends, therapists and lawyers willing to be interviewed. He wrote: "Reporters on the receiving end of this kind of PR blitz have to wonder if deviating from the talking points might jeopardize their access to all the other A-list clients."

=== Moses Farrow's response to Dylan and accusations against Mia ===
Dylan's brother Moses, who was 14 in 1992, has reconciled with Allen and is estranged from the Farrow family. When Dylan published her open letter, he said in an interview that several people had been in the house on the disputed day and that "no one, not my father or sister, was off in any private spaces". He asserted that Farrow had cultivated a climate in which he and his siblings had felt compelled to support her views, and that she had abused him physically and emotionally. Moses repeated the allegations in 2017 to Eric Lax, one of Allen's biographers.

=== 2017/2018: Dylan's op-ed and interview ===
External image
- Dylan Farrow (left) speaks to Gayle King, CBS This Morning, January 18, 2018.

In December 2017, following the Harvey Weinstein scandal, Dylan wrote an op-ed in the Los Angeles Times asking, "Why has the #MeToo revolution spared Woody Allen?" She repeated the molestation allegation in January 2018 in a television interview with Gayle King for CBS This Morning.

=== Allen's response to Dylan's interview ===
Allen issued a statement in response:

[E]ven though the Farrow family is cynically using the opportunity afforded by the Time's Up movement to repeat this discredited allegation, that doesn't make it any more true today than it was in the past. I never molested my daughter – as all investigations concluded a quarter of a century ago.

=== May 2018: Moses's letter defending Allen and accusing Farrow of child abuse ===
In January Moses had already reacted on his Twitter account to Dylan's new statements, explaining that he had seen Mia Farrow on many occasions trying to convince Dylan that she had been abused. On May 23, 2018, Moses posted online a long open letter with new elements, in which he alleged in detail that Farrow physically and emotionally abused him and Soon-Yi: "She hit me uncontrollably all over my body. She slapped me, pushed me backwards and hit me on my chest, shouting, 'How dare you say I'm a liar in front of my friend? You're the pathological liar.' I was defeated, deflated, beaten and beaten down. ... When Soon-Yi was young, Mia once threw a large porcelain centerpiece at her head. Luckily it missed, but the shattered pieces hit her legs. Years later, Mia beat her with a telephone receiver." Moses also says Farrow treated her biological children better than her adopted ones, and that Mia "brainwashed" her kids to accept her own version of insignificant things.

Moses claims that on the afternoon of the alleged abuse, he was at home: "As the 'man of the house' that day, I had promised to keep an eye out for any trouble, and I was doing just that. I remember where Woody sat in the TV room, and I can picture where Dylan and Satchel were. Not that everybody stayed glued to the same spot, but I deliberately made sure to note everyone's coming and going. I do remember that Woody would leave the room on occasion, but never with Dylan. He would wander into another room to make a phone call, read the paper, use the bathroom, or step outside to get some air and walk around the large pond on the property." Moses also claimed that the memory his sister has of having been abused while focusing her attention on an electric train set is not possible: "It's a precise and compelling narrative, but there's a major problem: there was no electric train set in that attic. There was, in fact, no way for kids to play up there, even if we had wanted to. It was an unfinished crawl space, under a steeply-angled gabled roof, with exposed nails and floorboards, billows of fiberglass insulation, filled with mousetraps and droppings and stinking of mothballs, and crammed with trunks full of hand-me-down clothes and my mother's old wardrobes. The idea that the space could possibly have accommodated a functioning electric train set, circling around the attic, is ridiculous."

Moses wrote that Thompson saw Farrow filming Dylan in what looked like an effort to coach her. Of the shy support he had given Mia as a teenager, Moses wrote: "During the custody hearing, my mother kept stressing how we needed to stick together as a family. Frightened and beaten down, I, too, played my part. I even wrote a letter condemning Woody, saying that he had done something horrible and unforgivable, and had broken my dreams. I even read the letter for the news media that were now regularly gathered at the end of our driveway, knowing that doing so would earn my mother's approval. That public denouncement of my father remains the biggest regret of my life."

=== 2018: Soon-Yi defends Allen and accuses Farrow of abuse ===
In an article in Vulture, Previn alleged that Farrow invented stories about her origins: "When Soon-Yi was a girl, she says, Farrow asked her to make a tape about her origins, detailing how she'd been the daughter of a prostitute who beat her. The request puzzled her, Soon-Yi says, since she had no memory of anything like that, so she refused...'Mia used to write words on my arm, which was humiliating, so I'd always wear long-sleeved shirts. She would also tip me upside down, holding me by my feet, to get the blood to drain to my head. Because she thought—or she read it, God knows where she came up with the notion—that blood going to my head would make me smarter or something'." According to Previn, Farrow also resorted to "arbitrarily showing her power" by slapping her across the face and spanking her with a hairbrush or calling her "stupid" and "moronic". Previn also claimed she and her adopted sisters were used as "domestics".

=== 2025: Allen expresses no regret about friendship with Jeffrey Epstein ===
In December 2025, Allen said he was "not sorry" for his friendship with the child sex trafficker Jeffrey Epstein. The two were acknowledged to have been neighbors by December 2010. In September 2025, Allen said that none of the girlfriends Epstein had when they were neighbors were underage girls. Allen is acknowledged to have sent Epstein a letter commemorating his 63rd birthday in 2016 in which he mentioned that "several young women" visited Epstein and that the parties he attended at Epstein's New York City home were also attended by "politicians, scientists, teachers, magicians, comedians, intellectuals, journalists, an entymologist [sic], a concert pianist." In the letter, he compared Epstein's New York City townhome to Castle Dracula, "where [Bela] Lugosi has three young female vampires who service the place. Add to this that Jeffrey lives in a vast house alone, one can picture him sleeping in damp earth."

== Responses from venues ==
In January 2018, the Goodspeed Opera House in Connecticut canceled its adaptation of Allen's film Bullets over Broadway (1994). The next month, Circle Theater in Grand Rapids, Michigan, also canceled its adaptation of Bullets over Broadway.

In February 2018, Savanah Lyon, a theater major at the University of California, San Diego (UCSD), began organizing an online petition to have a course teaching Allen's films removed from the UCSD syllabus, saying that because of the abuse allegations against him, the university should not have a class devoted to his work. On February 16, the UCSD Academic Senate announced that it would retain the course, stating that the removal of courses featuring "controversial material, or even material widely regarded as morally problematic" would undermine the values of free inquiry and academic freedom.

== Celebrity reactions ==
After Dylan's 2014 open letter, several actresses issued statements critical of Allen, including Rosie O'Donnell, Lena Dunham, Sarah Silverman, and Susan Sarandon.

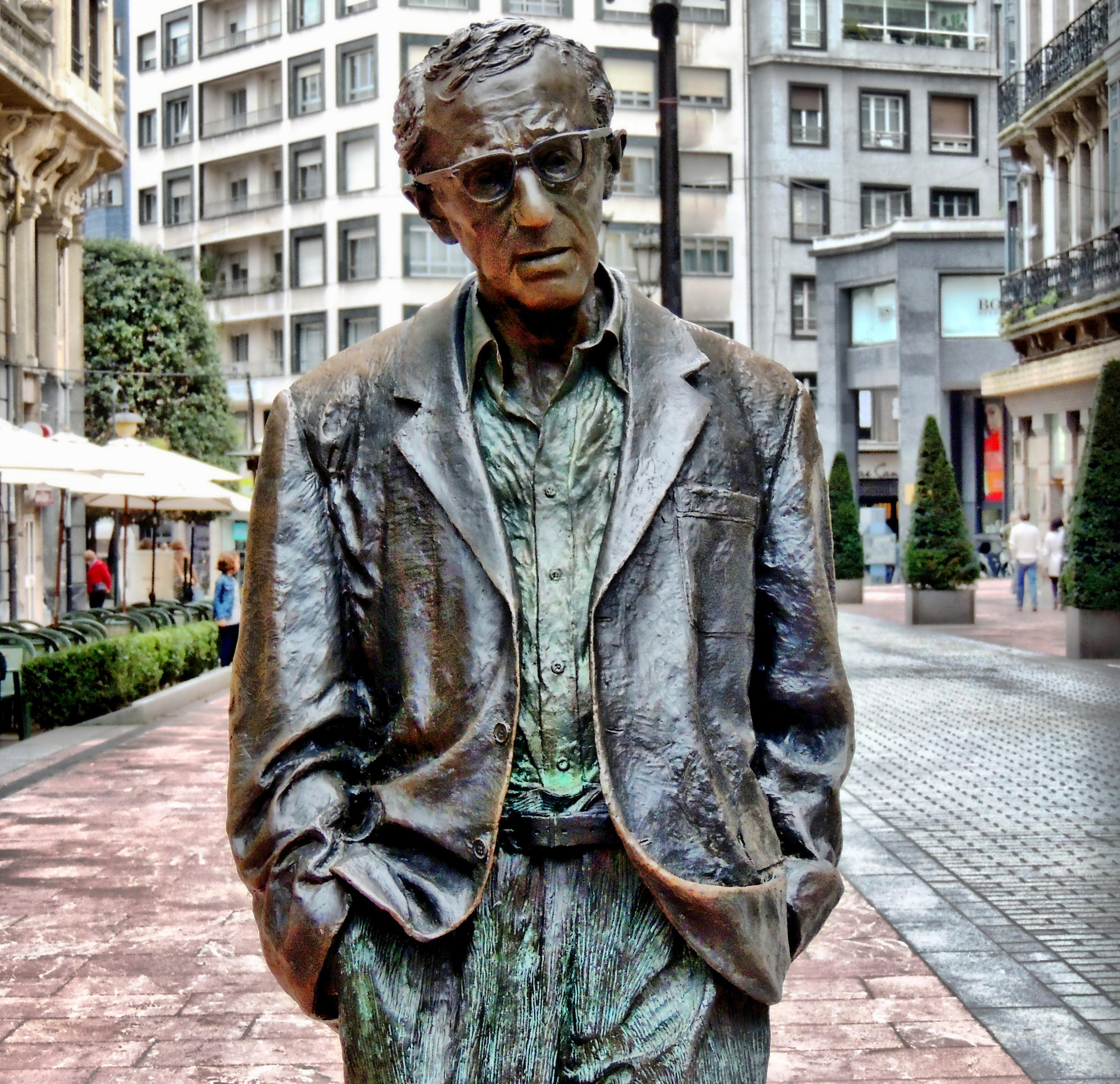
Monument to Woody Allen, Oviedo, Spain

The mood changed further as a result of the #MeToo and Time's Up movements and Dylan's op-ed. During a November 2017 women's rally, a banner referring to the allegation was hung around the neck of the Monument to Woody Allen in Oviedo, Spain. A women's group later asked that the statue be removed. From October 2017 statements supportive of Dylan, or expressing regret at having worked with Allen, were issued by Griffin Newman, Evan Rachel Wood, David Krumholtz, Mira Sorvino, Rebecca Hall, Timothée Chalamet, Rachel Brosnahan, Natalie Portman, Colin Firth, Hayley Atwell, and Freida Pinto. Newman, Hall, Chalamet, Elle Fanning, and Selena Gomez said they would donate their earnings from Allen's 2018 film A Rainy Day in New York to charities. But in 2024, Hall said she regretted apologizing for working with Allen, saying, "I don't think it's the responsibility of his actors to speak to that situation" and that she did not regret working with him.

Others expressed mixed feelings. Michael Caine, who starred in Allen's film Hannah and Her Sisters, said he was "stunned" by the allegations and did not regret working with Allen, having "had a wonderful time with him", but would not work with him again, citing his (Caine's) patronage of the NSPCC. John Turturro, who cast Allen in his romantic comedy Fading Gigolo, said, "He was a respectful person to me professionally. Now is a different time. I wouldn't cast him now. ... I don't regret having worked with him". Greta Gerwig initially declined to answer questions about her work with Allen in To Rome with Love, but in 2018, while promoting Lady Bird, she came under scrutiny for her work with Allen. On NPR's Fresh Air, when asked about working with Allen, Gerwig said, "I think I'm living in that space of fear of being worried about how I talk about it and what I say." She responded to a similar question after Lady Bird won the Golden Globe Award for Best Motion Picture – Musical or Comedy, saying, "[my] job right now I think is to occupy the position of writer and director." After being publicly criticized by Dylan Farrow for ignoring her allegations, Gerwig apologized for working with Allen. She elaborated in an interview with The New York Times: "Dylan Farrow's two different pieces made me realize that I increased another woman's pain, and I was heartbroken by that realization. I grew up on his movies, and they have informed me as an artist, and I cannot change that fact now, but I can make different decisions moving forward." Fanning said that she regretted her decision "if it hurt anyone" but did not apologize for working with Allen. Joaquin Phoenix said, "When I worked with Woody, I knew about the stuff that had come up years ago. I know his daughter ended up writing an open letter. I was not aware of that when we worked together." In an interview on NBC's Meet the Press, Jeff Daniels said, "Would I do another one with Woody? The difficult decision would be to turn him down, because of The Purple Rose of Cairo." Peter Sarsgaard, when asked whether he would work with Allen, said, "It's such a complicated question. I've already done a Woody Allen movie". Chloë Sevigny said, "I have my own turmoil that I'm grappling with over that decision. Would I work with him again? Probably not." Marion Cotillard said, "I have to say today, yeah, if he were to ask me again ... I don't think it would ever happen because the experience we had together was very odd. I admire some of his work but we had no connection on set."

Those expressing support for Allen included Barbara Walters, Diane Keaton, Javier Bardem, Jude Law, Alec Baldwin, and Bill Maher. Cherry Jones said, "There are those who are comfortable in their certainty. I am not. I don't know the truth ... When we condemn by instinct our democracy is on a slippery slope." Scarlett Johansson said, "I love Woody, I believe him, and I would work with him anytime." She added, "I see Woody whenever I can, and I have had a lot of conversations with him about it. I have been very direct with him, and he's very direct with me. He maintains his innocence, and I believe him." Emily Mortimer said, "I believe in due process...I think these things really need to go through all the legal processes before anyone can judge. I don't really have an answer to those questions." When asked by Christiane Amanpour about the allegations against Allen, Cate Blanchett replied, "At the time, I said it's a very painful and complicated situation for the family, which I hope they have the ability to resolve", and added, "If these allegations need to be reexamined, which, in my understanding, they've been through court, then I'm a big believer in the justice system and setting legal precedents...If the case needs to be reopened, I am absolutely, wholeheartedly in support of that." Kate Winslet declined to comment on the matter, saying, "As the actor in the film, you just have to step away and say I don't know anything, really, and whether any of it is true or false. Having thought it all through, you put it to one side and just work with the person." She called the experience of working with Allen "extraordinary". Later she changed her stance, saying, "It's like, what the fuck was I doing working with Woody Allen and Roman Polanski? It's unbelievable to me now how those men were held in such high regard so widely in the film industry and for as long as they were. It's fucking disgraceful. And I have to take responsibility for the fact that I worked with them both. I can't turn back the clock. I'm grappling with those regrets but what do we have if we aren't able to just be fucking truthful about all of it?" Javier Bardem said, "I am very shocked by this sudden treatment. Judgments in the states of New York and Connecticut found him innocent...I don't agree with the public lynching that he's been receiving, and if Woody Allen called me to work with him again, I'd be there tomorrow morning. He's a genius." Alan Alda said, "I'd work with him again if he wanted me. I'm not qualified to judge him. I don't know all the facts. I don't know if he's guilty or innocent. But you can be uncertain—that's what I go on. I just don't have enough information to convince me I shouldn't work with him. And he's an enormously talented guy."

Caine, who initially said he would not work with Allen again, later said, "If he had a trial and someone proved he had done something, I wouldn't do it, no. But I didn't read of him being on trial and being found guilty or fined or sent to prison or anything. This is all things that people say. You can't go on hearsay the whole time." Jeff Goldblum said, "I think there is a presumption of innocence until proven guilty. I also admire his body of work. So I would consider working with him again until I learned something more." Larry David, who read Allen's autobiography, Apropos of Nothing, called it "a fantastic book, so funny. You feel like you're in the room with him... it's just a great book and it's hard to walk away after reading that book thinking that this guy did anything wrong." When asked about Allen while promoting Da 5 Bloods, Spike Lee said, "I'd just like to say Woody Allen's a great, great filmmaker, and this cancel thing is not just Woody. And I think that when we look back on it, [we're] gonna see that, short of killing somebody, I don't know if you can just erase somebody like they never existed. Woody's a friend of mine ... I know he's going through it right now."

== Woody Allen memoir Apropos of Nothing ==
In his memoir, published in 2020, Allen addresses Dylan's allegation, writing that, unlike other cases of sexual abuse that could have been ignored without being taken seriously or adequately investigated, the accusation against him was immediately and thoroughly investigated by two groups of experts which concluded that the evidence proved that there was no sexual abuse, that Dylan's statements had "a rehearsed quality" and she was likely "coached or influenced by her mother". Regarding the criticism against Yale New Haven for having destroyed the original case notes, Allen maintains that that was Yale New Haven's and the FBI's usual procedure to preserve privacy. Moreover, the New York State Child Welfare scrupulously investigated the case for 14 months and concluded that there was no credible evidence of abuse and that the allegation was unfounded.

Allen recounts a Yale New Haven interview session in which Farrow explained to experts how Dylan was so disturbed by the sexual abuse that she turned to her sister Lark for physical comfort. Allen noted that Lark was in New York on the day of the alleged abuse and couldn't have physically interacted with Dylan, following which Farrow changed her account and said that, "Dylan hugged [Lark] spiritually." Allen also contends that Maco's investigation should have been closed the moment his experts ruled out the possibility of abuse, and states Maco's statement that there was "probable cause" was unfounded. Allen also writes that a nanny and a housekeeper who worked at Farrow's house said that on multiple occasions the prosecutor came to the residence and he and Farrow went out to lunch. Allen regrets that this does not seem the most impartial way to conduct an investigation.

Allen also claims that during the custody trial, a court clerk habitually drove Farrow home from the courthouse and that that was an "unfair conduit to the judge"; referred to Moses's testimony that he witnessed how Farrow coached Dylan; and reported the testimony of a babysitter to whom Dylan said, "Mummy wants me to lie." Allen alleges that long before the allegation of abuse emerged, Farrow took Dylan to a child therapist because the girl had trouble distinguishing between reality and fantasy and that, in the midst of family turmoil, Farrow suggested to the child that she had been abused which resulted in Dylan sincerely believing it.

== Allen v. Farrow documentary ==
The sexual abuse allegation was the subject of a 2021 HBO documentary series, Allen v. Farrow. Directed by Kirby Dick and Amy Ziering, the series features home videos and interviews with family members, including Dylan Farrow, and is told largely from her point of view and Mia Farrow's. Allen, Soon-Yi Previn and Moses Farrow declined to participate and were not interviewed for the documentary. It has received largely favorable reviews, but has been criticized for one-sidedness and omission of facts.

Allen and Soon-Yi Previn denounced the series, which they accused of treating them unfairly and perpetuating falsehoods. The filmmakers rejected the charges.

== See also ==
- Woody Allen filmography
- Woody Allen: A Documentary
