= Mia Farrow on screen and stage =

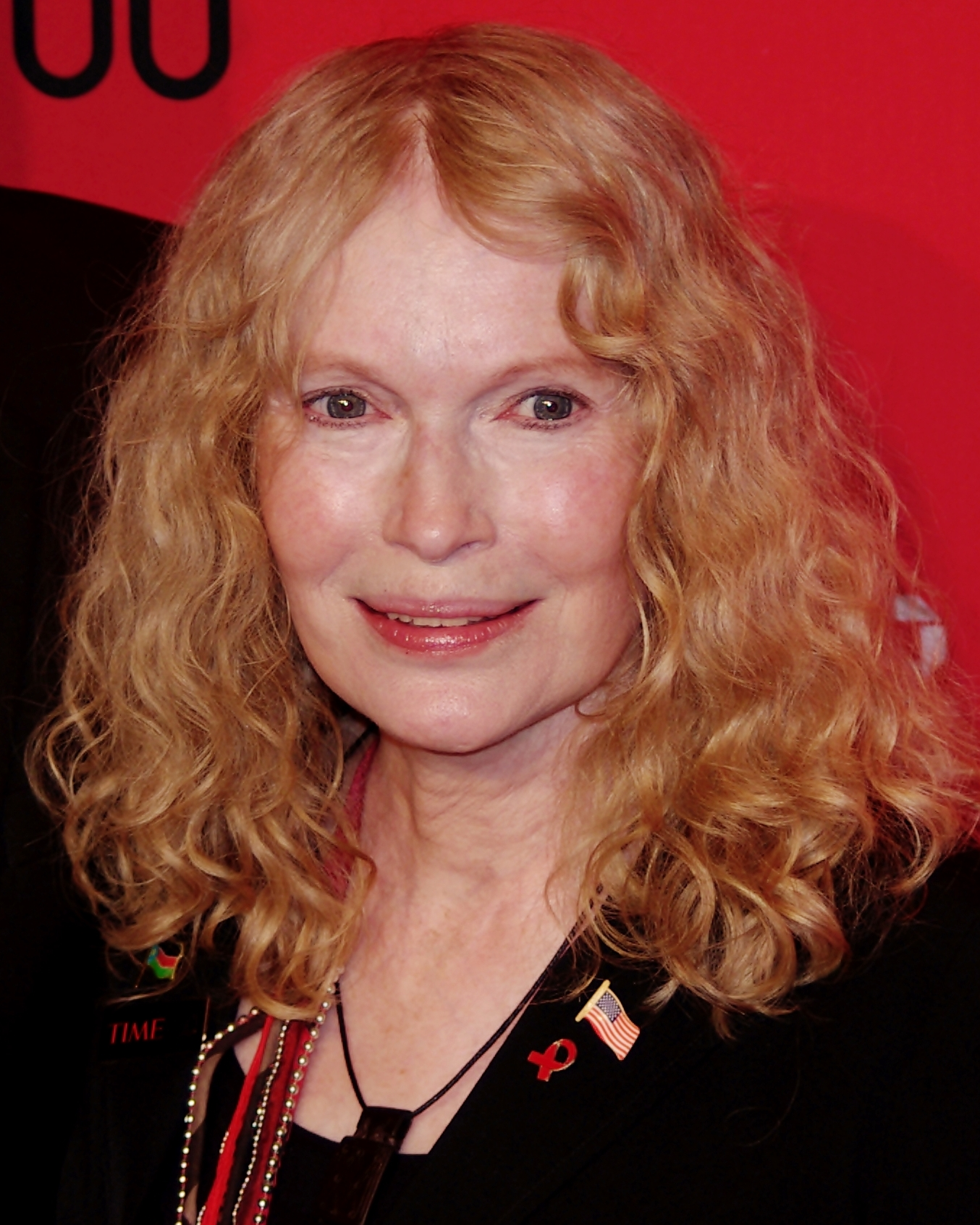
Farrow in 2012

Mia Farrow is an American actress whose career has spanned six decades. The daughter of actress Maureen O'Sullivan and director John Farrow, she had an uncredited appearance in John Paul Jones (1959) before making her feature debut in Guns at Batasi (1964), for which she earned a Golden Globe for New Star of the Year. From 1964 to 1966, she portrayed Allison MacKenzie on the dramatic television series Peyton Place.

Farrow subsequently earned critical and commercial recognition for her leading role in Roman Polanski's horror film Rosemary's Baby (1968), followed by further critical attention for her role opposite Dustin Hoffman in the drama John and Mary (1969). Throughout the 1970s, Farrow appeared in numerous stage productions abroad, and became the first American actress to join the Royal Shakespeare Company. She also appeared in film during this period, notably portraying Daisy Buchanan in Paramount Pictures' film adaptation of The Great Gatsby (1974). Beginning with 1982's A Midsummer Night's Sex Comedy, Farrow would spend much of the 1980s and early-1990s appearing in films directed by her then-partner Woody Allen, including The Purple Rose of Cairo (1985), Hannah and Her Sisters (1987), and Alice (1990), for each of which she received critical accolades.

Later credits include the 1999 independent film Coming Soon, the horror remake The Omen (2006), and the romantic comedy The Ex (2007). Farrow also provided voice work playing Daisy Suchot in Luc Besson's animated film Arthur and the Invisibles (2006), and reprised the role for its two sequels, Arthur and the Revenge of Maltazard (2009) and Arthur 3: The War of the Two Worlds (2010). She also had supporting roles in Michel Gondry's comedy Be Kind Rewind (2008), and Todd Solondz's Dark Horse (2011).

== Film ==
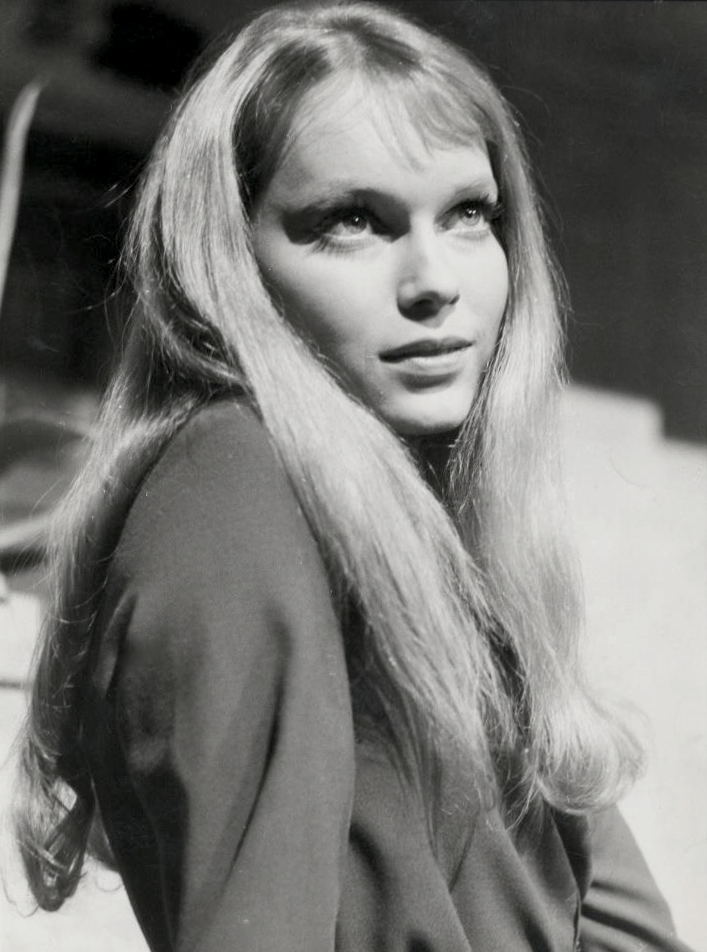
Farrow in Guns at Batasi (1964)

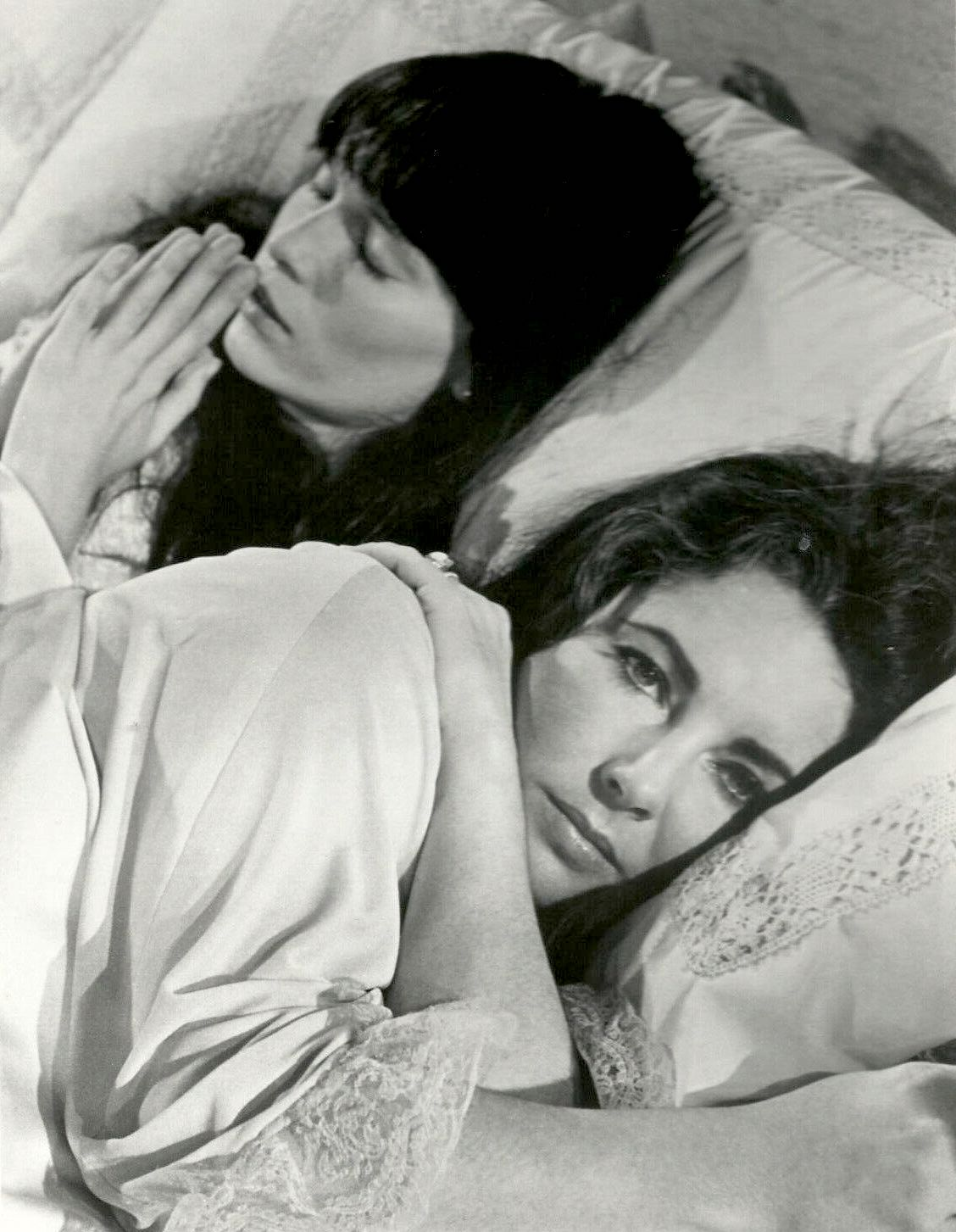
Farrow and Elizabeth Taylor in Secret Ceremony (1968)

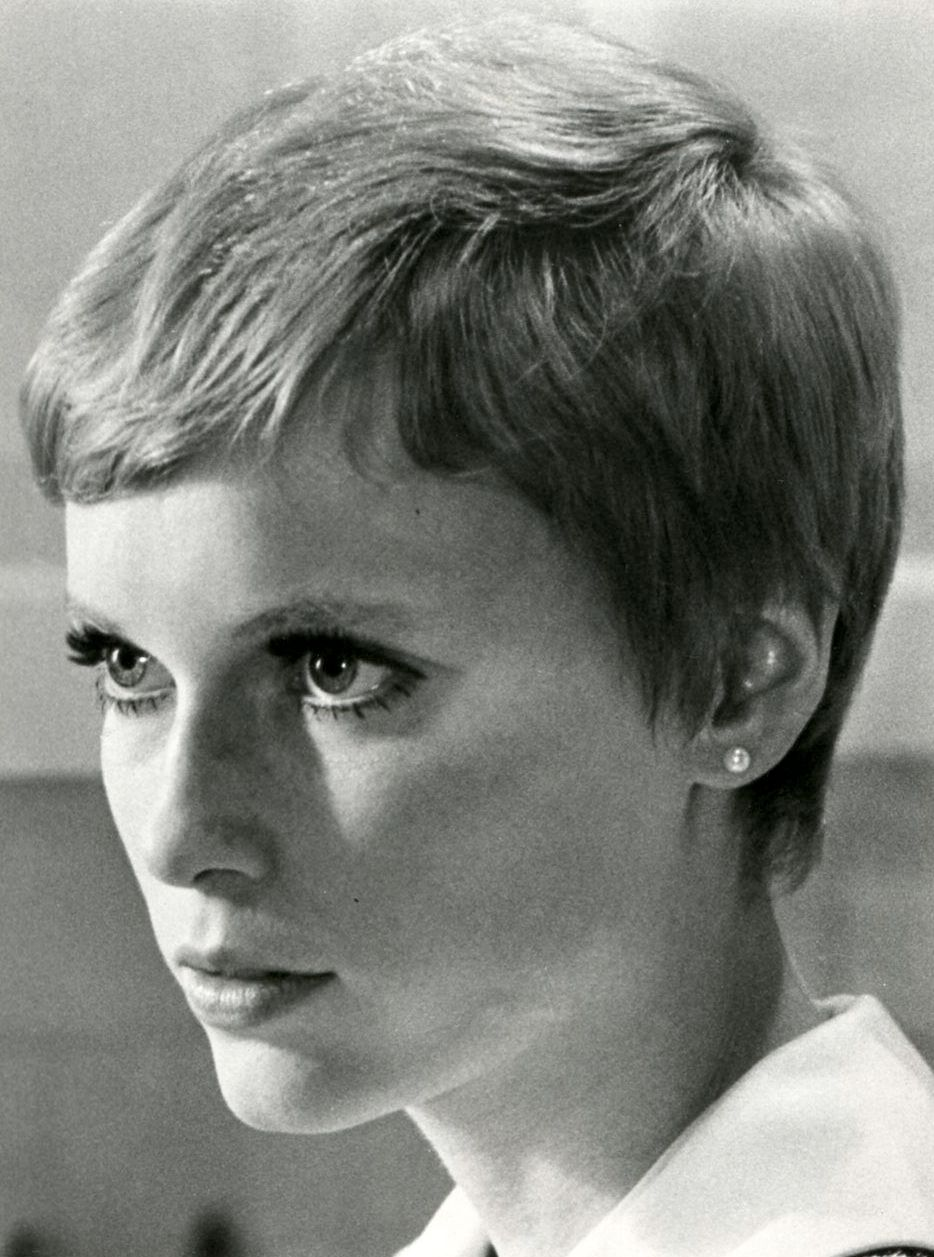
Farrow in Rosemary's Baby (1968)

Year	Title	Role	Notes	Ref.
1959	John Paul Jones	Unknown	Uncredited	
1964	Guns at Batasi	Karen Erickson		
1968	Secret Ceremony	Cenci		
1968	Rosemary's Baby	Rosemary Woodhouse		
1968	A Dandy in Aspic	Caroline		
1969	John and Mary	Mary		
1971	See No Evil (Blind Terror)	Sarah		
1971	Goodbye, Raggedy Ann	Brooke Collier	Television film	
1972	Dr. Popaul	Christine Dupont		
1972	Follow Me!	Belinda		
1974	The Great Gatsby	Daisy Buchanan		
1976	Peter Pan	Peter Pan	Television film	
1977	Full Circle	Julia Lofting	Also known as The Haunting of Julia	
1978	A Wedding	Elizabeth 'Buffy' Brenner		
1978	Avalanche	Caroline Brace		
1978	Death on the Nile	Jacqueline De Bellefort		
1979	Hurricane	Charlotte Bruckner		
1982	A Midsummer Night's Sex Comedy	Ariel Weymouth		
1982	The Last Unicorn	Unicorn/Lady Amalthea	Voiceover	
1982	Sarah	Sarah	Voiceover; Also known as Sarah The Seventh Match and Sarah and the Squirrels	
1983	Zelig	Dr. Eudora Nesbitt Fletcher		
1984	Broadway Danny Rose	Tina Vitale		
1984	Supergirl	Alura In-Ze		
1985	The Purple Rose of Cairo	Cecilia		
1986	Hannah and Her Sisters	Hannah		
1987	Radio Days	Sally White		
1987	September	Lane		
1988	Another Woman	Hope		
1989	New York Stories	Lisa		
1989	Crimes and Misdemeanors	Halley Reed		
1990	Alice	Alice Jansen Tate		
1991	Shadows and Fog	Irmy		
1992	Husbands and Wives	Judy Roth		
1994	Widows' Peak	Miss Katherine O'Hare/Clancy		
1995	Miami Rhapsody	Nina Marcus		
1995	Reckless	Rachel		
1997	Private Parts	Herself		
1997	Redux Riding Hood	Doris	Voiceover; Short film	
1999	Forget Me Never	Diane McGowin	Television film	
1999	Coming Soon	Judy Hodshell		
2001	A Girl Thing	Betty McCarthy	Television film	
2002	The Secret Life of Zoey	Marcia Carter	Television film	
2002	Purpose	Anna Simmons		
2004	Samantha: An American Girl Holiday	Grandmary Edwards	Television film	
2006	The Omen	Mrs. Baylock		
2007	Arthur and the Minimoys	Daisy Suchot		
2007	The Ex	Amelia Kowalski		
2008	Roman Polanski: Wanted and Desired	Herself		
2008	Be Kind Rewind	Miss Falewicz		
2008	As We Forgive	Narrator		
2009	Arthur and the Revenge of Maltazard	Daisy Suchot		
2010	Arthur 3: The War of the Two Worlds	Daisy Suchot		
2011	Dark Horse	Phyllis		

== Television ==
Year	Title	Role	Notes	Ref.
1963	The Doctors	Jimmy's Girlfriend	Episode: "The Stone Maiden"	
1964–1966	Peyton Place	Allison MacKenzie	117 episodes	
1974	The Muppets Valentine Show	Herself	Pilot television	
1990–1991	Long Ago and Far Away	Narrator	Episode: "Pegasus"; Episode: "Beauty and the Beast"	
1998	The Wonderful World of Disney	Doris Koster	Episode: "Miracle at Midnight"	
2000–2003	Third Watch	Mona Mitchell	5 episodes	
2016	Documentary Now!	Herself	Episode: "Mr. Runner Up: My Life as an Oscar Bridesmaid, Part 1"	
2022	The Watcher	Pearl Winslow	Main role	

== Theatre ==
Year	Title	Role	Notes	Ref.
1963	The Importance of Being Earnest	Cecily Cardew	Madison Avenue Playhouse	
1971	Jeanne d'Arc au bûcher	Joan of Arc	Royal Albert Hall	
1972	Mary Rose	Mary Rose	Shaw Theatre	
1973	Three Sisters	Irina	Greenwich Theatre	
1973	The House of Bernarda Alba	Jan and Adela	Greenwich Theatre	
1975	The Marrying of Ann Leete	Ann Leete	Aldwych Theatre	
1976	The Zykovs	Pavla Tselovnyeva	Aldwych Theatre	
1976	Ivanov	Sasha	Aldwych Theatre	
1979	Romantic Comedy	Phoebe Craddock	Ethel Barrymore Theatre	
1996	Getting Away with Murder	Dr. Bering's Wife	Broadhurst Theatre	
1999	Who's Afraid of Virginia Woolf?	Honey	Majestic Theatre	
2000	Who's Afraid of Virginia Woolf?	Honey	Ahmanson Theatre	
2002	The Exonerated	Sunny Jacobs	US tour	
2003	Fran's Bed	Fran	Long Wharf Theatre	
2005	Fran's Bed	Fran	Playwrights Horizons	
2014	Love Letters	Melissa Gardner	Brooks Atkinson Theatre	
2024	The Roommate	Sharon	Booth Theatre	

== Sources ==
- Bartrop, Paul R. (2012). A Biographical Encyclopedia of Contemporary Genocide. Santa Barbara, California: ABC-CLIO. ISBN 978-0-313-38678-7.
- González, Jonio (1993). Mia Farrow (in Spanish). Barcelona, Spain: Icaria Editorial. ISBN 978-8-474-26210-0.
