= List of awards and nominations received by Mia Farrow =

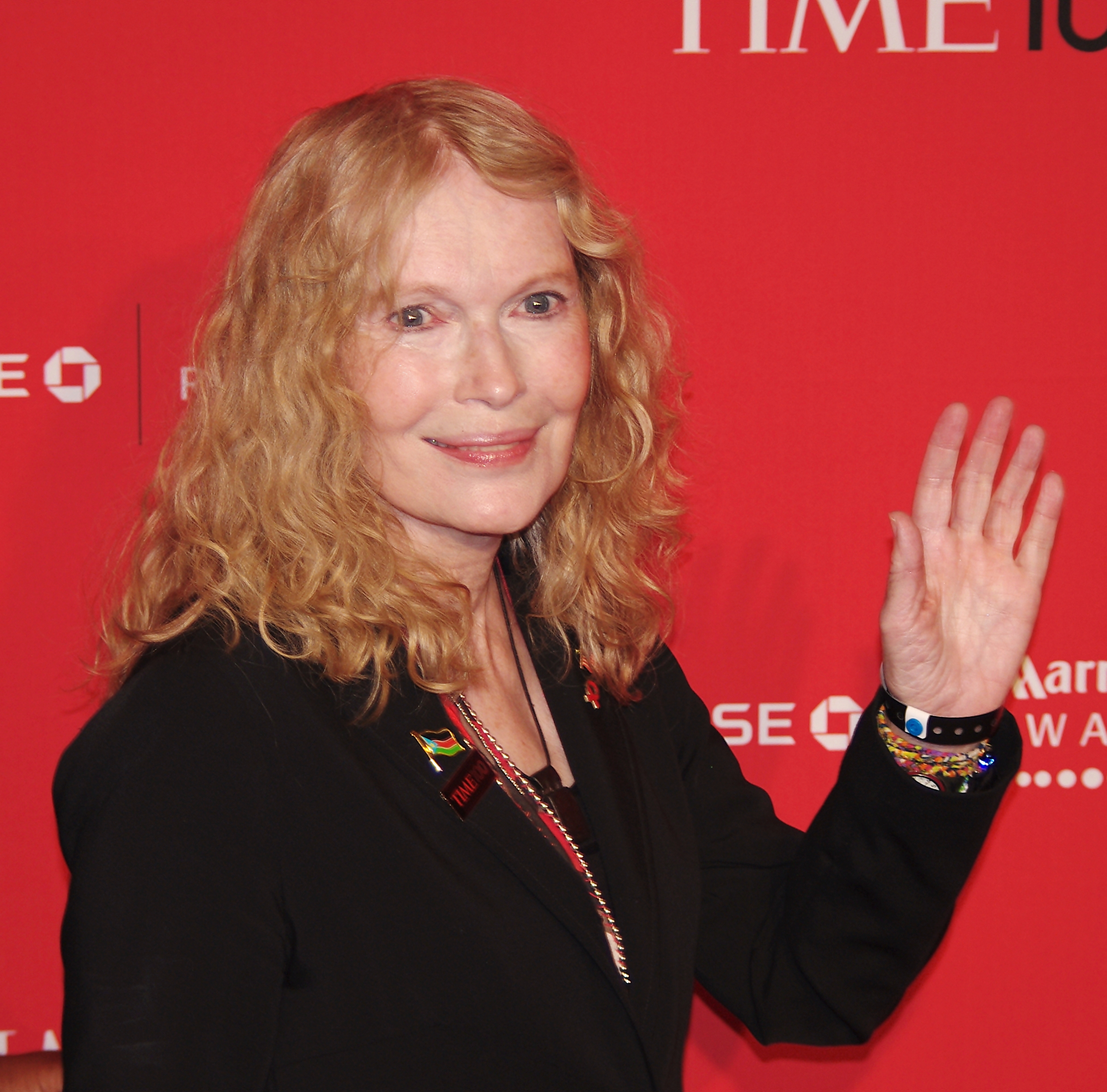
Farrow in 2012

Mia Farrow is an American actress. Known for her roles on stage and screen. She has won two Golden Globe Awards (out of nine nominations) and has been nominated for three British Academy Film Awards and a Tony Award.

Farrow won her first Golden Globe for New Star of the Year for her performance in Guns at Batasi (1964). For her role as a naive young woman impregnated by the devil in Roman Polanski's psychological thriller Rosemary's Baby (1968) she was nominated for the BAFTA Award for Best Actress in a Leading Role and the Golden Globe Award for Best Actress in a Motion Picture – Drama. She collaborated with Woody Allen acting in fourteen of his films which included the period fantasy romance The Purple Rose of Cairo, featuring a performance which earned her a National Board of Review Award for Best Actress as well as nominations for the Golden Globe Award and BAFTA Award. She was also received nominations for her performances in his films such as Broadway Danny Rose (1984), Hannah and Her Sisters (1986), and Alice (1990).

On stage, she was nominated for the Tony Award for Best Actress in a Play for her role in the Jen Silverman play The Roommate (2025).

== Major associations ==
=== BAFTA Awards ===
Year	Category	Nominated work	Result	Ref.
British Academy Film Awards
1969	Best Actress in a Leading Role	Secret Ceremony / Rosemary's Baby / John and Mary	Nominated	
1985	Best Actress in a Leading Role	The Purple Rose of Cairo	Nominated	
1986	Best Actress in a Leading Role	Hannah and Her Sisters	Nominated	

=== Golden Globe Awards ===
Year	Category	Nominated work	Result	Ref.
1964	New Star of the Year – Actress	Guns at Batasi	Won	
1965	Best TV Star - Female	Peyton Place	Nominated	
1968	Best Actress in a Motion Picture – Drama	Rosemary's Baby	Nominated	
1969	World Film Favorite – Female	—N/a	Won	
1969	Best Actress – Motion Picture Comedy or Musical	John and Mary	Nominated	
1984	Best Actress – Motion Picture Comedy or Musical	Broadway Danny Rose	Nominated	
1985	Best Actress – Motion Picture Comedy or Musical	The Purple Rose of Cairo	Nominated	
1990	Best Actress – Motion Picture Comedy or Musical	Alice	Nominated	
1999	Best Actress – Miniseries or Television Film	Forget Me Never	Nominated	

=== Tony Awards ===
Year	Category	Nominated work	Result	Ref.
2025	Best Actress in a Play	The Roommate	Nominated	

== Miscellaneous awards ==
Organizations	Year	Category	Work	Result	Ref.
Alliance of Women Film Journalists	2007	EDA Humanitarian Activism Award	N/A	Nominated	
Alliance of Women Film Journalists	2007	EDA Lifetime Achievement Award	N/A	Nominated	
Alliance of Women Film Journalists	2009	EDA Humanitarian Activism Award	N/A	Nominated	
David di Donatello Awards	1968	Best Foreign Actress	Rosemary's Baby	Won	
David di Donatello Awards	1989	Best Foreign Actress	Crimes and Misdemeanors	Won	
Fotogramas de Plata	1970	Best Foreign Movie Performer	Rosemary's Baby	Won	
Golden Raspberry Awards	1982	Worst Actress	A Midsummer Night's Sex Comedy	Nominated	
Laurel Awards	1968	Most Promising Female Newcomer	N/A	Won	
Laurel Awards	1968	Female Dramatic Performance	Rosemary's Baby	Nominated	
National Board of Review	1990	Best Actress	Alice	Won	
Prism Awards	2003	Performance in a Television Movie or Miniseries	The Secret Life of Zoey	Nominated	
San Sebastián International Film Festival	1972	Best Actress	Follow Me!	Won	
Saturn Awards	1985	Best Actress	The Purple Rose of Cairo	Nominated	

== Critics' associations ==
Organizations	Year	Category	Work	Result	Ref.
Kansas City Film Critics Circle	1983	Best Supporting Actress	Zelig	Won (Note: Shared with Linda Hunt for The Year of Living Dangerously.)	
