= Shadows and Fog =

1991 film by Woody Allen

- Theatrical release poster
- Directed by: Woody Allen
- Written by: Woody Allen
- Produced by: Robert Greenhut; Charles H. Joffe (executive); Jack Rollins (executive)
- Starring: Woody Allen; Kathy Bates; John Cusack; Mia Farrow; Jodie Foster; Fred Gwynne; Julie Kavner; Madonna; John Malkovich; Kenneth Mars; Kate Nelligan; Donald Pleasence; Lily Tomlin
- Cinematography: Carlo Di Palma
- Edited by: Susan E. Morse
- Production company: Orion Pictures
- Distributed by: Orion Pictures (United States); Columbia Pictures (International)
- Release date: December 5, 1991
- Running time: 85 minutes
- Country: United States
- Language: English
- Budget: $14 million
- Box office: $2,735,731

Shadows and Fog is a 1991 American black-and-white comedy film directed by Woody Allen and based on his one-act play Death (1975). It stars Allen, Mia Farrow, John Malkovich, Kathy Bates, David Ogden Stiers, Jodie Foster, Donald Pleasence, Lily Tomlin, John Cusack, Madonna, and Kenneth Mars. It was filmed on a 26,000-square-foot (2,400 m^{2}) set at Kaufman Astoria Studios, which was the biggest set ever built in New York. It was also Allen's last film for Orion Pictures.

Shadows and Fog is an homage to German Expressionist filmmakers Fritz Lang, G. W. Pabst and F. W. Murnau in its visual presentation, and to the writer Franz Kafka in theme. Critical reception of the film was generally mixed.

== Plot ==
Max Kleinman is awakened by a vigilante mob, which claims to be looking for a serial killer and therefore needs his help. Kleinman's landlady gives him a bag containing pepper. Irmy and her boyfriend Paul, a pair of circus performers, quarrel about getting married and having a baby. Paul leaves and goes to another tent where he has sex with Marie, another artist. Seeing this, Irmy runs to the city and enters a brothel. A student named Jack, besotted by Irmy, offers her increasingly large sums to have sex with him. She finally succumbs when the sum reaches $700.

Seeking to learn his role in the vigilantes' plan, Kleinman visits a coroner's house and has a glass of sherry with him. After he leaves, the coroner is murdered by the killer. Kleinman comes to the police station to protest a local family's eviction. There, the police talk about the coroner's murder, saying that they have a clue about the killer in the fingerprints on the sherry glass. A panicked Kleinman meets Irmy in the police station, who had been arrested at the brothel for prostitution. She protests against the police calling her "whore,” and in the confusion Kleinman takes the glass. Irmy is allowed to leave the police station after a $50 fine, and she meets Kleinman outside. Together they start exploring the city, seeing its different scenes — a man peeping into a woman's room, a starving mother and child, a church — and decide to go back.

Paul arrives in the city looking for Irmy. He goes into a bar where Jack is having a drink. The student reflects on the wonderful experience he had with "a sword-swallower,” shocking Paul. Kleinman and Irmy return to his place to stay but are refused entry by his fiancée. They go to the pier but are ambushed by the vigilante mob who find the sherry glass in Kleinman's pocket. Thinking him to be the killer, they decide to lynch Irmy and Kleinman, but the latter uses the pepper spray and they escape.

Meanwhile, Irmy and Paul meet, and at first Paul is ready to kill Irmy for sleeping with another man. They break off their fight when they find the starving woman murdered, and the baby lying on the ground. They decide to keep the child and return to the circus. Kleinman comes to the brothel searching for Irmy but is unable to find her. From his rival at work, he learns about the circus leaving the town and decides to follow it. At the circus, Kleinman meets the magician Armstead, whom he greatly admires. The murderer arrives and tries to kill them but is thwarted by Armstead. Kleinman becomes Armstead's assistant in the circus, while Irmy and Paul continue their careers as circus performers and raise their newfound child.

== Cast ==
- Woody Allen as Kleinman
- Victor Argo as Hacker's Vigilante #2
- Kathy Bates as Prostitute
- Philip Bosco as Mr. Paulsen
- Charles Cragin as Spiro
- John Cusack as Student Jack
- Mia Farrow as Irmy
- Jodie Foster as Dorrie
- Fred Gwynne as Hacker's Follower
- Robert Joy as Spiro's Follower
- Julie Kavner as Alma
- Steven Keats as Hacker's Vigilante #3 (uncredited)
- Michael Kirby as Killer
- William H. Macy as Cop With Spiro
- Madonna as Marie
- John Malkovich as Paul, The Clown
- Kenneth Mars as Magician
- Kate Nelligan as Eve
- Donald Pleasence as Doctor
- James Rebhorn as Hacker's Vigilante #1
- John C. Reilly as Cop At Police Station
- Wallace Shawn as Simon Carr
- Kurtwood Smith as Vogel's Follower
- Josef Sommer as Priest
- Lily Tomlin as Jenny
- David Ogden Stiers as Hacker
- Daniel von Bargen as Hacker's Vigilante #4

== Soundtrack ==
- The Cannon Song from Little Threepenny Music (1928) - By Kurt Weill - Performed by Canadian Chamber Ensemble
- The Cannon Song from Little Threepenny Music (1928) - By Kurt Weill - Performed by London Sinfonietta
- When Day Is Done (1926) - Written by Robert Katscher & Buddy G. DeSylva - Performed by Jack Hylton and His Orchestra
- Ja, Ja die Frau'n sind meine schwache Seite - Written by Kurt Schwabach & Augustin Egen - Performed by Jack Hylton and His Orchestra
- Prologue from the Seven Deadly Sins (1934) - Music by Kurt Weill - Text by Bertolt Brecht
- Alabama Song (1930) - By Kurt Weill (1927) & Bertolt Brecht - Performed by Marek Weber
- Moritat (1928) - By Kurt Weill and Bertolt Brecht - Performed by Berlin Staatsoper
- When the White Lilacs Bloom Again (1928) - Music by Franz Doelle - Poem by Fritz Rotter - Performed by The Jack Hylton Orchestra

== Reception ==
=== Box office ===
After its premiere in 1991, Shadows and Fog opened to wide release on March 20, 1992 in 288 North American cinemas. In its first three days, it grossed $1,111,314 ($3,858 per screen). It finished its run with $2,735,731. It did not turn up in the United Kingdom until February 1993, where it attained a total gross of only £87,622.

Its production budget has been estimated at $14 million.

=== Critical response ===
Shadows and Fog received a mixed response from critics and holds an approval rating of 54% on the review aggregator Rotten Tomatoes from 28 reviews, with an average rating of 6/10. The critical consensus reads: "Shadows and Fog recreates the chiaroscuro aesthetic of German Expressionism, but Woody Allen's rambling screenplay retreads the director's neurotic obsessions with derivative results."

Vincent Canby of The New York Times gave the film modest praise, writing,"Like 'Zelig,' 'Shadows and Fog' is a pastiche of references to the works of others, but it's a brazen, irrepressible original in the way it uses those references." He added, "A note of caution: 'Shadows and Fog' operates on its own wavelength. It is different. It should not be anticipated in the manner of other Allen films. It's unpredictable, with its own tone and rhythm, even though, like all of the director's work, it's a mixture of the sincere, the sardonic and the classically sappy." Variety similarly wrote, "Exquisitely shot in black & white, Woody Allen's Shadows and Fog is a sweet homage to German expressionist filmmaking and a nod to the content of socially responsible tales since narrative film began. Allen's fans will regard this as a nice try that falls short."

Desson Thomson of The Washington Post wrote:

There's nothing particularly objectionable about Woody Allen's "Shadows and Fog." That's part of the problem. This black-and-white seriocomedy, set in the 1920s, is an amiable ramble through some of Allen's favorite themes and European film movements. It has a small army of guest stars and a fair offering of Allen jokes. But it's also flat and peakless. It doesn't conclude so much as stop. There's nothing to take home but your feet.

In 2016, film critics Robbie Collin and Tim Robey ranked Shadows and Fog as one of the worst movies by Woody Allen.

Recalling the film’s critical and commercial failure in his 2020 memoir, Apropos of Nothing, Allen joked that “the filming of Shadows and Fog went off without a hitch except for the movie.” Allen also states in his memoir that he "knew the film was destined for commercial doom," but made the movie regardless, disdaining artistic fear he says would yield "safe middle-of-the-road projects," and, summarizing the finished product, added: "It’s not a bad idea but you have to be in the mood for it, and marketing tests showed it did not appeal to homo sapiens."

=== Accolades ===
Award	Category	Recipient	Result
David di Donatello Awards	Best International Film	Shadows and Fog	Won
Nastro d'Argento (Silver Ribbon) Awards	Best Cinematography	Carlo Di Palma	Won
