= Elliott Wilk =

American judge

Elliott Wilk was a New York State court judge. He was best known as the judge who oversaw Mia Farrow's 1993 divorce and child custody case against Woody Allen, but his career also included cases involving landlord-tenant disputes and other disputes that received widespread attention at the time, and were later considered important precedents.

Wilk was born on August 1, 1941, and raised in Laurelton, Queens, New York City. He was educated at the University of Rochester and New York University School of Law. He worked as a public interest and legal aid lawyer until his election to the Civic Court bench in 1977. He was appointed an acting justice in 1984, and was finally elected in 1994. Wilk was known as a liberal judge, but also witty and forthright. He served until his death from brain cancer on July 2, 2002.
