= September (1987 film) =

1987 film by Woody Allen

- Theatrical release poster
- Directed by: Woody Allen
- Written by: Woody Allen
- Produced by: Robert Greenhut
- Starring: Denholm Elliott; Mia Farrow; Elaine Stritch; Jack Warden; Sam Waterston; Dianne Wiest
- Cinematography: Carlo Di Palma
- Edited by: Susan E. Morse
- Distributed by: Orion Pictures
- Release date: December 18, 1987
- Running time: 82 minutes
- Country: United States
- Language: English
- Budget: $10 million
- Box office: $486,434

September is a 1987 American drama film written and directed by Woody Allen. The film is modeled on Anton Chekhov's 1899 play Uncle Vanya, though the gender roles are often subverted.

Allen's intention for September was that it be like "a play on film", hence the great number of long takes and few camera effects. The film does not use Allen as an actor, and is one of his more straightforward dramatic films. The cast includes Mia Farrow, Sam Waterston, Dianne Wiest, Elaine Stritch, Jack Warden, and Denholm Elliott.

Critical response to September was generally average.

== Plot ==
After a suicide attempt, Lane has moved into her country house to recuperate in Vermont. Her best friend, Stephanie, has come to join her for the summer to have some time away from her husband. Lane's brassy, tactless mother, Diane, has recently arrived with her physicist husband Lloyd, Lane's stepfather. Lane is close to two neighbors: Peter, a struggling writer, and Howard, a French teacher. Howard is in love with Lane, Lane is in love with Peter, and Peter is in love with Stephanie.

Diane, once a well-known actress, wants Peter to write her biography, primarily because, many years earlier, a teenage Lane supposedly shot her mother's abusive lover (reminiscent of the real-life events of Lana Turner and her daughter Cheryl Crane). Lane does not want this painful event to go back in the spotlight, but Peter thinks it would make a great story.

One evening, Diane decides to host a party, ruining Lane's plans with Peter. Peter arrives early and confesses to Stephanie that he has wanted to be alone with her for a long time. Outside, there is an electrical storm, and the lights go out. Candles and piano music create a romantic setting. Diane finds her old Ouija board and talks to the spirits of her previous lovers. A very drunk Howard finally reveals his feelings to Lane, who does not return them. Peter tells Lane that he does not share her feelings. Lane seems to take the rejection well. When everyone else has gone to bed, Peter tries seducing Stephanie, but she is conflicted, later following him back to his house.

The next morning, a real estate agent is showing a couple around the house. Lane is counting on the money from the sale to move back to New York. Lane is feeling depressed since she has not taken Peter's rejection well after all, exacerbating Stephanie's guilt. Soon after, Peter arrives and kisses Stephanie, just as Lane opens the door to show the room to prospective buyers, and Lane is shocked. Stephanie insists that it meant nothing, while Peter tells Lane the two of them have deep feelings for each other. Diane comes downstairs, announcing that she and her husband are going to move into the house permanently. Lane becomes even more distraught, insisting that Diane gave Lane the property a long time ago. Diane dismisses it as one of her own drunken whims. Lane experiences a breakdown, accusing her mother of being fake and insensitive.

The film's climax comes when an anguished Lane cries, "You're the one who pulled the trigger! I just said what the lawyers told me to say", thus revealing that Diane was actually the one who shot her abusive lover. Diane's lawyers presumably thought it would be better if Lane took the fall, as she would be treated leniently. The ordeal has obviously been hugely detrimental to Lane. Diane finally concedes that if she could go back, she would behave differently.

Everyone leaves except Stephanie and Lane. The film ends with Stephanie encouraging Lane to move on and "keep busy".

== Cast ==
- Denholm Elliott as Howard
- Dianne Wiest as Stephanie
- Mia Farrow as Lane
- Elaine Stritch as Diane
- Sam Waterston as Peter
- Jack Warden as Lloyd
- Rosemary Murphy as Mrs. Mason
- Ira Wheeler as Mr. Raines
- Jane Cecil as Mrs. Raines

== Filming ==
Allen shot the film twice. It originally starred Sam Shepard as Peter (after Christopher Walken shot a few scenes, but was determined not to be right for the role), Maureen O'Sullivan as Diane, and Charles Durning as Howard. After editing the film, he decided to rewrite it, recast it, and reshoot it. He has since stated he would like to redo it again.

== Reception ==
September has a 63% approval rating on Rotten Tomatoes from 15 reviews. Audiences polled by CinemaScore gave the film an average grade of "B-" on an A+ to F scale.

== Soundtrack ==
- On a Slow Boat to China – Frank Loesser – Performed by Bernie Leighton
- Out of Nowhere – Johnny Green & Edward Heyman – Performed by Bert Ambrose and His Orchestra
- Just One More Chance – Sam Coslow & Arthur Johnston – Performed by Bert Ambrose and His Orchestra
- My Ideal – Leo Robin, Richard A. Whiting & Newell Chase – Performed by Art Tatum, Ben Webster, George Red Callender & Bill Douglass
- What'll I Do – Irving Berlin – Performed by Bernie Leighton
- I'm Confessin' (That I Love You) – Written by Al Neiburg, Doc Daugherty and Ellis Reynolds – Performed by Bernie Leighton
- Who – Jerome Kern, Otto A. Harbach (as Otto Harbach) & Oscar Hammerstein II – Performed by Bernie Leighton
- Moonglow – Will Hudson, Edgar De Lange & Irving Mills – Performed by Bernie Leighton
- When Day is Done – Robert Katscher & Buddy G. DeSylva – Performed by Bernie Leighton
- Night and Day – Cole Porter – Performed by Art Tatum, Ben Webster, George 'Red' Callender & Bill Douglass
