= Alice (1990 film) =

1990 film by Woody Allen

- Theatrical release poster
- Directed by: Woody Allen
- Written by: Woody Allen
- Produced by: Robert Greenhut
- Starring: Alec Baldwin; Blythe Danner; Judy Davis; Mia Farrow; William Hurt; Keye Luke; Joe Mantegna; Bernadette Peters; Cybill Shepherd; Gwen Verdon
- Cinematography: Carlo Di Palma
- Edited by: Susan E. Morse
- Distributed by: Orion Pictures
- Release date: December 25, 1990
- Running time: 106 minutes
- Country: United States
- Language: English
- Budget: $12 million
- Box office: $7.3 million

Alice is a 1990 American fantasy romantic comedy film written and directed by Woody Allen, and starring Mia Farrow, Joe Mantegna, and William Hurt. The film is a loose reworking of Federico Fellini's 1965 film Juliet of the Spirits and Lewis Carroll's 1865 novel Alice's Adventures in Wonderland.

Alice received mildly positive reviews.

== Plot ==
Alice Tate is an upper-class Manhattan homemaker who spends her days shopping, getting beauty treatments and gossiping with her friends. She has been married to wealthy Doug for 16 years, and they have two children who are being raised by a nanny.

One day, she has a brief encounter with Joe Ruffalo, a handsome jazz musician. She finds herself mysteriously attracted to him and experiences Catholic guilt for these feelings. This inner turmoil manifests itself in a backache. She is referred to Dr. Yang, an Asian herbalist who puts her under hypnosis. She reveals that what initially attracted her to her husband were in fact his superficial qualities: looks and money. She also reveals her feelings about Joe.

Dr. Yang gives Alice ancient herbs that make her act on her feelings toward Joe. They agree to meet. When the herbs wear off, Alice is appalled at her behavior and does not go to meet him as planned. The next herbs she receives turn her invisible. She spies on Joe going to visit his ex-wife Vicki. Much to prudish Alice's horror, they have sex in Vicki's office. Alice is now glad she did not go to meet Joe. However, the next herbal remedy allows Alice to communicate with the ghost of her first lover, Ed, who encourages her to discover more about Joe. Alice and Joe finally meet, under the pretense of their children having a "play-date". Alice and Joe's meetings become increasingly frequent.

When her guilt over her relationship with Joe becomes too much, Alice returns to Dr. Yang. Inhaling the soothing contents of an opium pipe, Alice falls asleep in Dr. Yang's rooms. She has vivid dreams about her Catholic upbringing. She remembers her mother. She remembers that she was at her happiest when she was helping people. She realizes that she has lost sight of many of her goals in her materialistic luxurious lifestyle. She also realizes this at a fundraising event in honor of Mother Teresa, one of Alice's idols. After the fundraiser, Joe and Alice sleep together. Alice realizes she is falling in love with him.

Alice shares the remaining invisibility herbs with Joe. She hears two of her friends gossiping about her and Joe. The gossip then moves onto Doug, where it is revealed that he has been having affairs, too. Invisible, Alice goes to his office party, where she sees Doug kissing a colleague. Her invisibility wears off and she confronts Doug about his affairs. Alice decides to leave Doug once and for all. She tells this to Joe. However, Joe has decided to reunite with his ex-wife after he spied on her therapy sessions when invisible and realized she still has feelings for him.

Stunned, Alice goes to Dr. Yang, who is leaving town. He gives her one final packet of herbs, telling her that these will create a potent love potion. Alice must choose between Joe and Doug. She goes to her sister Dorothy for advice. However, Dorothy is having a Christmas party, and the herbs get mixed in with the eggnog. All the men in the party become enamored with Alice. She flees in panic.

At home, Alice tells Doug that their marriage is over. She reveals her plans to go to Calcutta and work with Mother Teresa. Doug scoffs at this, doubting that Alice could survive without the luxuries she has grown accustomed to. However, Doug is proved wrong. Alice goes to Calcutta, where she meets Mother Teresa. Upon returning to New York, she moves into a modest apartment, raises the children on her own, and does volunteer work in her spare time.

== Cast ==
- Mia Farrow as Alice Jansen Tate
  - Rachel Miner as 12-year-old Alice
  - Kristy Graves as 18-year-old Alice
- Joe Mantegna as Joe Ruffalo
- William Hurt as Doug Tate
- Blythe Danner as Dorothy
  - Laurie Nayber as young Dorothy
- June Squibb as Hilda
- Holland Taylor as Helen
- Peggy Miley as Dorothy's maid
- Robin Bartlett as Nina
- Keye Luke as Dr. Yang
- Judy Davis as Vicki
- Alec Baldwin as Ed
- Bernadette Peters as Muse
- Cybill Shepherd as Nancy Brill
- Gwen Verdon as Alice's mother
- Patrick O'Neal as Alice's father
- Diane Salinger as Carol
- Bob Balaban as Sid Moscowitz
- Caroline Aaron as Sue
- Julie Kavner as decorator
- James Toback as professor
- Elle Macpherson as model
- Lisa Marie as office Christmas party guest

== Production ==
Allen came up with the idea for the film after having alternative treatment for a stye in his eye. The original title was The Magical Herbs of Dr. Yang, and it was filmed in late 1989. It was a difficult shoot, with Farrow raising her young children while filming and Allen obsessing over details; some scenes were reshot until he was satisfied. Allen later checked into a hospital by the end of the shoot, suffering from the stress.

Steve Buscemi filmed scenes that were cut from the final film.

This was Keye Luke's final film; he died just under three weeks following the film's release.

== Soundtrack ==
- Limehouse Blues (1921) – Written by Philip Braham & Douglas Furber – Performed by Jackie Gleason
- Breezin' Along with the Breeze (1926) – Written by Dizzy Gillespie, Seymour Simons & Richard A. Whiting – Performed by Jackie Gleason
- I Dream Too Much (1935) – Written by Dorothy Fields & Jerome Kern – Performed by Paul Weston and His Orchestra
- Moonglow (1933) – Music by Will Hudson & Irving Mills – Lyrics by Edgar De Lange – Performed by Artie Shaw and His Orchestra
- La Cumparsita (1916) – Written by Gerardo Matos Rodríguez – Performed by The Castilians
- The Courier – Written by Linda Hudes – Performed by The Big Apple Circus Band
- World Music – Written by Linda Hudes – Performed by The Big Apple Circus Band
- Caravan (1937) – Written by Duke Ellington, Irving Mills & Juan Tizol – Performed by Erroll Garner
- I Remember You (1942) – Written by Johnny Mercer & Victor Schertzinger – Performed by Jackie Gleason
- Moonlight Becomes You (1942) – Written by Jimmy Van Heusen & Johnny Burke – Performed by Jackie Gleason
- The Way You Look Tonight (1936) – Written by Dorothy Fields & Jerome Kern – Performed by Erroll Garner
- Alice Blue Gown(1919) – Written by Joseph McCarthy (lyricist) and Harry Tierney – Performed by Wayne King & His Orchestra
- Concerto No 1 In A Minor for Violin and Orchestra, BWV 1041(1717) – Written by Johann Sebastian Bach – Performed & Conducted by Pinchas Zukerman
- Darn That Dream (1939) – Written by Edgar De Lange & Jimmy Van Heusen – Performed by Thelonious Monk
- Southern Comfort (1949) – Written by Danny Alguire, Frank Thomas & Ward Kimball – Performed by Firehouse Five Plus Two
- Mack the Knife (1928) – Written by Kurt Weill & Marc Blitzstein & Bertolt Brecht
- Flight of the Foo Birds (1957) – Written by Neal Hefti – Performed by Count Basie
- Will You Still Be Mine (1941) – Written by Matt Dennis & Tom Adair (as Thomas M. Adair) – Performed by Erroll Garner
- O Tannenbaum – Traditional tune – Performed by Liberace
- We Wish You a Merry Christmas – Traditional tune – Performed by Liberace

== Release ==
=== Box office ===
Alice was a massive disappointment at the North American box office; the film grossed a domestic total of $7,331,647 on an estimated $12 million budget.

=== Critical reception ===
In his review in The New York Times, Vincent Canby wrote: "Alice is about one woman's tempest-tossed, giddy, herb-induced voyage of self-discovery. It is north-of-the-border magical realism—Alice flies, she becomes invisible, she is another person. It is hilarious and romantic, serious and exuberantly satiric."

On the review aggregator website Rotten Tomatoes, the film holds an approval rating of 71% based on 28 reviews, with an average rating of 6.2/10.

=== Accolades ===
Award	Category	Nominee(s)	Result
20/20 Awards	Best Original Screenplay	Woody Allen	Nominated
Academy Awards	Best Screenplay – Written Directly for the Screen	Woody Allen	Nominated
Artios Awards	Outstanding Achievement in Feature Film Casting – Comedy	Juliet Taylor	Nominated
César Awards	Best Foreign Film	Woody Allen	Nominated
David di Donatello Awards	Best Foreign Actress	Mia Farrow	Nominated
Golden Globe Awards	Best Actress in a Motion Picture – Musical or Comedy	Mia Farrow	Nominated
National Board of Review Awards	Best Actress	Mia Farrow	Won
Writers Guild of America Awards	Best Screenplay – Written Directly for the Screen	Woody Allen	Nominated
