= A Midsummer Night's Sex Comedy =

1982 film by Woody Allen

- Theatrical release poster
- Directed by: Woody Allen
- Written by: Woody Allen
- Produced by: Robert Greenhut
- Starring: Woody Allen; Mia Farrow; José Ferrer; Julie Hagerty; Tony Roberts; Mary Steenburgen
- Cinematography: Gordon Willis
- Edited by: Susan E. Morse
- Music by: Felix Mendelssohn
- Production company: Orion Pictures
- Distributed by: Warner Bros.
- Release date: July 16, 1982 (United States)
- Running time: 88 minutes
- Country: United States
- Language: English
- Box office: $9.1 million

A Midsummer Night's Sex Comedy is a 1982 American sex comedy film written and directed by Woody Allen, starring Allen and Mia Farrow.

The plot is loosely based on Swedish filmmaker Ingmar Bergman's 1955 comedy film Smiles of a Summer Night. It was the first of thirteen films that Allen would make starring Farrow. Her role of Ariel Weymouth was originally written for Diane Keaton, another Allen collaborator, but Keaton was preoccupied promoting Reds and preparing production on Shoot the Moon. Julie Hagerty, Mary Steenburgen, Tony Roberts and Jose Ferrer co-star. It also marks the first appearance of Allen as an ensemble performer in his own film. Previously, he had either been the lead character or did not appear at all.

A Midsummer Night's Sex Comedy received positive reviews and was a minor commercial success. However, it was nominated for one Golden Raspberry Award for Worst Actress, for Farrow at the 3rd Golden Raspberry Awards – the only time an Allen film has been nominated for a Razzie.

== Plot ==
It is 1906 in upstate New York. Distinguished philosopher Leopold Sturges and his much younger fiancée, Ariel Weymouth, are going to spend a weekend in the country with Leopold's cousin Adrian, and her crackpot inventor husband Andrew. Also on the guest list is womanizing doctor Maxwell Jordan and his latest girlfriend, free-thinking nurse Dulcy Ford. Over the course of the weekend, old romances reignite, new romances develop, and everyone ends up sneaking off behind everyone else's backs.

== Cast ==
- Woody Allen as Andrew
- Mia Farrow as Ariel Weymouth
- José Ferrer as Professor Leopold Sturges
- Julie Hagerty as Dulcy Ford
- Tony Roberts as Dr. Maxwell Jordan
- Mary Steenburgen as Adrian
- Adam Redfield as Foxx
- Moishe Rosenfeld as Mr. Hayes
- Timothy Jenkins as Mr. Thomson
- Michael Higgins as Reynolds
- Sol Frieder as Carstairs
- Boris Zoubok as Purvis
- Thomas Barbour as Blint
- Kate McGregor-Stewart as Mrs. Baker

== Background ==
Woody Allen explained the inspiration for the film:

I thought I wanted to do a film about poignant relationships, a film about a guy who missed an opportunity and was haunted by the thought and a girl who was about to throw in her lot with a much older man, not really the right one for her. The genesis was not a comedy but a kind of serious Chekhovian story, in the style of Interiors almost. That serious of a thing. Then I started to think, God, it sort of cries out for a comic treatment—a group of people at a summer house on a weekend and the silvery moon in concert with the animals and flowers. Why not take a comic approach to it? Let the seriousness be a subtext. So I started to write it, and it worked very rapidly for me. I started to take delight in it. You know, I hate the country, but I began wanting to create the country, not as I experience it but as I would like to.

== Soundtrack ==
- Symphony No.3 in A Minor (1842) - Written by Felix Mendelssohn - Performed by Leonard Bernstein and the New York Philharmonic
- Violin Concerto in E Minor, Opus 64 (1844) - Written by Felix Mendelssohn - Performed by Vasil Stefanov and the TVR Symphony Orchestra
- Piano Concerto No. 2 in D Minor, Opus 40 (1837) - Written by Felix Mendelssohn - Performed by Eugene Ormandy and The Philadelphia Orchestra
- A Midsummer Night's Dream (1826) - Written by Felix Mendelssohn - Performed by Eugene Ormandy and The Philadelphia Orchestra
- Die schöne Müllerin, D795 No.2: 'Wohin? (1823) - Written by Franz Schubert - Played on piano by Mary Steenburgen
- Dichterliebe, Opus 48, No.7: Ich grolle nicht (1840) - Written by Robert Schumann - Played on piano by Mary Steenburgen
- "The Lord's Prayer" (1935) - music by Albert Hay Malotte - Played on piano by Mia Farrow

== Release ==
The film opened on July 16, 1982, at 501 North American theaters, and made $2,514,478 ($5,018 per screen) in its opening weekend. It grossed $9,077,269 in its entire run.

== Reception ==
On the review aggregator website Rotten Tomatoes, 74% of 27 critics' reviews are positive, with an average rating of 6.4/10. The website's consensus reads: "It may not [be] Woody Allen's best work, but the frothy, fun A Midsummer Night's Sex Comedy is still worth a look." Metacritic, which uses a weighted average, assigned the film a score of 51 out of 100, based on 12 critics, indicating "mixed or average" reviews.

Janet Maslin of The New York Times wrote, "Whatever Mr. Allen is doing in constructing this pretty, slight, gently entertaining movie, he isn't doing the thing he does best. A Midsummer Night's Sex Comedy gives the impression of someone speaking fluently but formally in a language not his own." Roger Ebert gave the film two stars out of four and explained, "I don't object to A Midsummer Night's Sex Comedy on grounds that it's different from his earlier films, but on the more fundamental ground that it's adrift. There doesn't seem to be a driving idea behind it, a confident tone to give us the sure notion that Allen knows what he wants to do here." Gene Siskel awarded two-and-a-half stars out of four, calling it "a nice picture, but insubstantial." Variety called the film "a pleasant disappointment, pleasant because [Allen] gets all the laughs he goes for in a visually charming, sweetly paced picture, a disappointment because he doesn't go for more." Sheila Benson of the Los Angeles Times wrote, "What's most disappointing about Sex Comedy is that for all its incessant—and anachronistic—talk, there's a serious shortage of new ideas from writer-director Allen. The film's fullest idea is that opportunity, once lost, can never again be recaptured. We might have hoped for this bittersweetness and a great deal more from one of the screen's nerviest innovators." Gary Arnold of The Washington Post stated, "The crucial problem with Sex Comedy is that one detects no persuasive sexual chemistry in any of the alleged, three-cornered mating games. It's impossible to believe that anyone's susceptibilities are deeply stirred or anyone's feelings likely to be hurt. Allen can't establish the basic sense of attraction and the emotional gravity that underscores the frivolity of the romantic hide-and-seek." Pauline Kael of The New Yorker wrote, "The group is rather amusing, and for a while the film seems saucy and fairly promising (when we learn, for example, that the prof and his fiancée met at the Vatican). Viewers may feel that everything must be building toward a big, explosive joke. But nothing really develops—not even the clashes that are prepared for. Nothing busts loose."
