= The Purple Rose of Cairo =

1985 film by Woody Allen

- Theatrical release poster
- Directed by: Woody Allen
- Written by: Woody Allen
- Produced by: Robert Greenhut
- Starring: Mia Farrow; Jeff Daniels; Danny Aiello
- Cinematography: Gordon Willis
- Edited by: Susan E. Morse
- Music by: Dick Hyman
- Distributed by: Orion Pictures
- Release dates: January 1985 (US Film Festival); March 1, 1985
- Running time: 82 minutes
- Country: United States
- Language: English
- Budget: $15 million
- Box office: $10.6 million

The Purple Rose of Cairo is a 1985 American period fantasy romantic tragicomedy film, written and directed by Woody Allen. Set in Depression-era New Jersey, it stars Mia Farrow as a film lover who flees her abusive husband (Danny Aiello) after a film character (Jeff Daniels) falls in love with her and enters the real world. It is inspired by metafictional works such as the films Sherlock Jr. (1924) and Hellzapoppin' (1941) and the play Six Characters in Search of an Author (1921).

The Purple Rose of Cairo was released on March 1, 1985 by Orion Pictures. It won the BAFTA Award for Best Film, while Allen received several screenwriting nominations, including at the Academy Awards, the BAFTA Awards, and the Writers Guild of America Awards. Allen has ranked it among his best films.

== Plot ==
In 1935, during the Great Depression, New Jersey waitress Cecilia endures a wearying job and an abusive marriage to her unfaithful husband, Monk, feeling trapped with nowhere to turn. After losing her job, she distracts herself by going to the movies, where she finds herself rewatching The Purple Rose of Cairo with a particular focus on archaeologist side character Tom Baxter, who falls in love with a Copacabana singer in the film's story.

Baxter notices Cecilia watching him and develops an attraction to the point where he addresses her directly and steps out of the film to run off with her, to the chagrin of the other, also sentient characters of the film. While Cecilia and Baxter grow closer as they spend an evening on the town together, the film's characters refuse to perform with him gone. The theater manager calls the film's producer and Baxter's actor Gil Shepherd is informed, who comes to town to fix the problem.

Shepherd runs into Cecilia and has her take him to Baxter, who refuses to return to the film as other versions of him across different screenings also start to rebel. Monk hears about Cecilia and Baxter's exploits and confronts them. Baxter beats him in a fair fight, so Monk hits him from behind, and a disgusted Cecilia refuses to leave with him. Baxter is accosted by a prostitute and taken to a brothel, but he remains faithful to Cecilia. Shepherd charms and kisses Cecilia, but she turns him down in favor of Baxter.

While Purple Rose producers plan to destroy its copies once they get Baxter back inside, he and Cecilia get engaged as he returns to the theater and takes her into the film. Inside, he defies his pre-written romance and shows Cecilia the film's world, only for Shepherd to arrive at the theater and profess his love for her. The men argue over her and she chooses Shepherd, loving Baxter but preferring to live in the real world.

Baxter reluctantly returns to the film, while Cecilia finally leaves Monk for good, believing she and Shepherd will run away to Hollywood together. He has already left, his seduction a ploy to get Baxter back into the film, though he appears guilty on the return flight. She sits forlornly in the theater watching Top Hat, but the sight of Ginger Rogers and Fred Astaire dancing to "Cheek to Cheek" captures her attention and she begins to smile.

== Cast ==
- Mia Farrow as Cecilia
- Jeff Daniels as Tom Baxter / Gil Shepherd
- Danny Aiello as Monk
- Dianne Wiest as Emma
- Milo O'Shea as Father Donnelly
- Van Johnson as Larry Wilde
- Deborah Rush as Rita
- Zoe Caldwell as The Countess
- John Wood as Jason
- John Rothman as Mr. Hirsch's Lawyer
- Stephanie Farrow as Cecilia's Sister
- Michael Tucker as Gil's agent
- Alexander H. Cohen as Raoul Hirsch
- Camille Saviola as Olga
- Peter McRobbie as The Communist
- Karen Akers as Kitty Haynes
- Juliana Donald as Usherette
- Edward Herrmann as Henry
- Paul Herman as the Penny Pitcher
- George Martin as Movie Audience member
- Raymond Serra as Hollywood Executive
- Glenne Headly as Hooker, in the bordello
- Loretta Tupper as Music Store Owner

Michael Keaton was originally cast as Tom Baxter/Gil Shepherd because Allen was a fan of his work. Allen later felt that Keaton, who took a pay cut to work with the director, was too contemporary and hard to accept in the period role. The two amicably parted ways after ten days of filming and Daniels replaced Keaton in the role. Viggo Mortensen was cast in an unspecified role, but his scenes were cut before release.

== Production ==
Several scenes featuring Tom and Cecilia are set at the Bertrand Island Amusement Park, which closed just prior to the film's production. Many of the outside scenes were filmed in Piermont, New York, a village on the Hudson River about 15 miles north of the George Washington Bridge. Store fronts had false facades reflecting the depression-era setting. It was also filmed at the Raritan Diner in South Amboy, New Jersey. Woody Allen shut down the Kent Theater on Coney Island Avenue in Brooklyn, the neighborhood he grew up in, to film there.

In a rare public appearance at the National Film Theatre in 2001, Allen listed The Purple Rose of Cairo as one of only a few of his films that ended up being "fairly close to what I wanted to do" when he set out to write it. Allen provided more detail about the film's origins in a comment he made a year earlier, during a press junket for Small Time Crooks:

Purple Rose was a film that I just locked myself in a room [to write]. ... I wrote it and halfway through it didn't go anywhere and I put it aside. I didn't know what to do. I toyed around with other ideas. Only when the idea hit me, a long time later, that the real actor comes to town and she has to choose between the [screen] actor and the real actor and she chooses the real actor and he dumps her, that was the time it became a real movie. Before that it wasn't. But the whole thing was manufactured.

== Soundtrack ==
- "Cheek to Cheek" (1935) – written by Irving Berlin; vocals by Fred Astaire
- "I Love My Baby, My Baby Loves Me" (1925) – music by Harry Warren; sung by Jeff Daniels with Loretta Tupper on piano
- "Alabamy Bound" (1925) – music by Ray Henderson; played by Cynthia Sayer; sung by Jeff Daniels
- "One Day at a Time" – written by Dick Hyman; sung by Karen Akers

== Reception ==
=== Box office ===
On its opening weekend, The Purple Rose of Cairo earned $114,095 from three theaters in the United States and Canada. Its total gross in the United States and Canada was $10,631,333.

=== Critical response ===
On the review aggregator website Rotten Tomatoes, The Purple Rose of Cairo holds an approval rating of 93%, based on 41 reviews, with an average score of 8/10. The website's critics consensus reads, "Lighthearted and sweet, The Purple Rose of Cairo stands as one of Woody Allen's more inventive—and enchantingly whimsical—pictures." Metacritic, which uses a weighted average, assigned the film a score of 75 out of 100, based on seven critics, indicating "generally favorable" reviews.

Roger Ebert of the Chicago Sun-Times gave the film four out of four stars, writing, "The Purple Rose of Cairo is audacious and witty and has a lot of good laughs in it, but the best thing about the movie is the way Woody Allen uses it to toy with the very essence of reality and fantasy." Time Out also gave the film favorable appraisal, writing, "the star-struck couple, Farrow and Daniels, work wonders with fantastic emotions, while Allen's direction invests enough care, wit and warmth to make it genuinely moving." Vincent Canby of The New York Times wrote some of the most glowing contemporary praise, stating, "My admiration for Mr. Allen extends to everyone connected with The Purple Rose of Cairo—all of the actors, including Mr. Daniels, Mr. Aiello, Dianne Wiest and the players within the film within; Stuart Wurtzel, the production designer, and particularly Gordon Willis, the director of photography, who has great fun imitating the look of the movie Cecilia falls in love with, as well as in creating a style fitting to the depressed times that frame the interior film. ... I'll go out on a limb: I can't believe the year will bring forth anything to equal The Purple Rose of Cairo. At 84 minutes, it's short but nearly every one of those minutes is blissful."

=== Accolades ===
Award	Category	Subject	Result
Academy Awards	Best Original Screenplay	Woody Allen	Nominated
BAFTA Awards	Best Film	Robert Greenhut and Woody Allen	Won
BAFTA Awards	Best Original Screenplay	Woody Allen	Won
BAFTA Awards	Best Actress	Mia Farrow	Nominated
BAFTA Awards	Best Special Visual Effects	R/Greenberg Associates	Nominated
Bodil Awards	Best Non-European Film	Woody Allen	Won
BSFC Awards	Best Screenplay	Woody Allen	Won
Cannes Film Festival	FIPRESCI Prize	Woody Allen	Won
Casting Society of America	Artios Award for Best Casting for Feature Film, Comedy	Juliet Taylor	Nominated
César Awards (1986)	Best Foreign Film	Woody Allen	Won
Fotogramas de Plata	Best Foreign Film	Woody Allen	Won
French Syndicate of Cinema Critics	Critics Award for Best Foreign Film	Woody Allen	Won
Golden Globe Awards	Best Motion Picture – Musical or Comedy	Robert Greenhut	Nominated
Golden Globe Awards	Best Screenplay	Woody Allen	Won
Golden Globe Awards	Best Actor – Motion Picture Musical or Comedy	Jeff Daniels	Nominated
Golden Globe Awards	Best Actress – Motion Picture Comedy or Musical	Mia Farrow	Nominated
Hochi Film Awards	Best Foreign Language Film	Woody Allen	Won
ALFS Awards	Film of the Year		Won
Mainichi Film Awards	Best Foreign Film	Woody Allen	Won
NSFC Awards	Best Film	Robert Greenhut	2nd place
NSFC Awards	Best Screenplay	Woody Allen	2nd place
Writers Guild of America Awards	Best Screenplay Written Directly for the Screen	Woody Allen	Nominated

The film was recognized as one of the "All-Time 100 Best Films" by Time magazine.

== Legacy ==
In 1991, Jeff Daniels founded the Purple Rose Theatre Company in his hometown of Chelsea, Michigan. The theater takes its name from The Purple Rose of Cairo.

== See also ==
- List of films featuring fictional films
