= The Secret Life of Zoey =

2002 television film

The Secret Life of Zoey is a 2002 Lifetime TV drama starring Mia Farrow, Julia Whelan, and Cliff De Young. The film follows the struggles of divorced parents, played by Farrow and De Young, as they attempt to save their seemingly perfect daughter (Whelan) from a secret addiction to prescription drugs.

== Plot ==
Following the divorce of Zoey Carter's parents, Marcia and Larry Carter, sixteen-year-old Zoey begins to use drugs. From her parents' perspective, she appears to be well-adjusted and mature. However, she obtains drugs from local dealers and uses this is as a coping mechanism. Initially, Zoey's parents appear to be clueless as to the fact that she has a problem with drugs and that she is able to deceive her parents; for example, when her parents find her passed out in the backseat of her car, she defends herself by claiming that she just crawled into the backseat and fell asleep. Her secret behavior goes unnoticed at first, as her good grades and volunteer work make her appear to be a model teenager. However, Zoey escalates to stealing cash in order to buy pills and marijuana. Her drug dealer, older student Ron Morris gives her drugs to increase her addiction and encourages her to shoplift to buy more.

Zoey's addiction is discovered when her mother, Marcia finds a stash of pills in her backpack after a drug-induced fainting episode. Zoey is sent to drug rehab. Her first stint there gives only the appearance of success, as Zoey continues her secret behavior. After an overdose, Zoey returns to rehab, where her counselor, Mike Harper works with her parents to help Zoey break free of her addiction.

== Principal cast ==
- Mia Farrow as Marcia Carter
- Julia Whelan as Zoey Carter
- Cliff De Young as Larry Carter
- Andrew McCarthy as Mike Harper
- Michael Coristine as Ron Morris
- Kerry Sandomirsky as Cathy
- Katharine Isabelle as Kayla
- Crystal Lowe as Cheerleader

== Reception ==
Originally titled On the Edge, The Secret Life of Zoey was released in the United States on August 19, 2002, to mixed reviews. The script was viewed alternately as a fresh take on a clichéd premise, or another entrant in the mediocre teen anti-drug genre. The two female leads, Farrow and Whelan, were cited as the movie's bright spots. Whelan in particular was noted for the emotional depth and naturalness of her performance; the Orlando Sentinel's Hal Boedeker went so far as to describe her as "The sole reason to watch 'The Secret Life of Zoey'". Mia Farrow's reviews were not so universally positive, but she was nominated for Best Performance in a TV movie or Miniseries at the 2003 PRISM Awards, which honor outstandingly realistic depictions of drug use, drug addiction and other dependence in film and television.
