= The Roommate (play) =

Stage play by Jen Silverman

- Original language: English
- Written by: Jen Silverman
- Characters: Sharon; Robyn
- Genre: Drama
- Setting: A big old house in Iowa City, Iowa, present day, summer.

Premiere
- Date: 2015
- Place: Actors Theatre of Louisville

The Roommate is a stage play written by American playwright Jen Silverman. The play is a two-person character study.

== Synopsis ==
Sharon is recently divorced and lives in Iowa and invites Robyn, relocating from New York City, to be her roommate. As the two get to know each other better, secrets are revealed and they learn more about themselves in the process.

== Original cast and characters ==
| Character | Louisville | Sarasota | San Francisco | Williamstown | Chicago | Broadway |
| Character | 2015 | 2016 | 2017 | 2017 | 2018 | 2024 |
|---|---|---|---|---|---|---|
| Sharon | Margaret Daly | Jo Twiss | Susi Damilano | S. Epatha Merkerson | Sandra Marquez | Mia Farrow |
| Robyn | Tasha Lawrence | Rita Rehn | Julia Brothers | Jane Kaczmarek | Ora Jones | Patti LuPone |

== Production history ==
The play was first performed at the Actors Theatre of Louisville in the 2015 Humana Festival of New American Plays, directed by Mike Donahue. In 2016, it was performed at the Florida Studio Theatre. In 2017, the play was performed at the San Francisco Playhouse from May 23 to July 1, directed by Becca Wolff. In 2017, the play was performed during the Williamstown Theatre Festival from June 27-July 16. In 2018, the play was performed by the Steppenwolf Theatre Company, directed by Phylicia Rashad. In 2019, Long Wharf Theatre produced the play, with Tasha Lawrence reprising her role from the original production and also directed by Donahue. Mia Farrow and Patti LuPone starred in the 2024 Broadway mounting directed by Jack O’Brien, which opened on Thursday, September 12, 2024 at the Booth Theatre. The production closed on December 15, 2024.
