= Follow Me! (film) =

1972 British comedy-drama film by Carol Reed

- Original publicity poster
- Directed by: Carol Reed
- Screenplay by: Peter Shaffer
- Based on: The Public Eye by Peter Shaffer
- Produced by: Hal B. Wallis
- Starring: Mia Farrow; Topol; Michael Jayston; Margaret Rawlings; Annette Crosbie; Dudley Foster; Michael Aldridge; Michael Barrington; Neil McCarthy
- Cinematography: Christopher Challis
- Edited by: Anne V. Coates
- Music by: John Barry
- Color process: Technicolor
- Production company: Hal Wallis Productions
- Distributed by: Universal Pictures
- Release date: 18 July 1972 (New York City)
- Running time: 93 minutes
- Country: United Kingdom
- Language: English

Follow Me! (U.S.title: The Public Eye) is a 1972 British comedy-drama film directed by Carol Reed and starring Mia Farrow, Topol and Michael Jayston. Adapted by Peter Shaffer from his 1962 play The Public Eye, the picture marks Carol Reed's last completed film. The score was composed by John Barry and the film was edited by Anne V. Coates.

== Plot ==
Set in London, it is the story of Charles, a successful but rather stuffy businessman, who meets and marries Belinda, a free-spirited American woman. After a time, he believes she is having an affair because she spends long hours away from home during the day. Charles hires a private detective to follow his wife. Belinda becomes aware that she is being followed, and the detective realises she has found out. However rather than abandoning the case, the detective begins an elaborate game of cat and mouse with the complicity of the wife. The detective finally informs Charles that his wife never had an affair, and merely goes on solitary exploratory walks around the city. The husband realises he has been neglectful and made his wife unhappy. He joins the game of following his wife as an adventure.

== Cast ==
- Mia Farrow as Belinda
- Topol as Julian Cristoforou
- Michael Jayston as Charles
- Margaret Rawlings as Mrs. Sidley
- Annette Crosbie as Miss Framer
- Dudley Foster as Mr. Mayhew
- Michael Aldridge as Sir Philip Crouch
- Michael Barrington as Mr. Scrampton
- Neil McCarthy as Parkinson

== Production ==
Editor Anne Coates said Hal Wallis was deferential to Carol Reed and would call him "Sir Carol".

== Reception ==
The Monthly Film Bulletin wrote: "Peter Shaffer expands and updates his one-act play The Public Eye and inevitably courts the objection that the comedy of the original has been ruthlessly broadened and its sentimental bias spelled out over-large on the big screen. But in the process of rendering characters and action more detailed, Shaffer has evolved a curious concoction, somehow poised between the enjoyable absurdity of high romantic comedy and the sentimental tidying up of women's magazine fiction."

Variety wrote: "Peter Shaffer's stage one-acter lasted roughly half as long as this film version and, since nothing has been done to beef up the plot, a good deal of padding was necessary. Curiously, however, it's the padding – expertly staged by Carol Reed and sumptuously photographed by Christopher Challis – that supplies most of the entertainment, Mia Farrow, who looks fine in a new Margaret Sullivan haircut and simple but elegant togs designed by Julie Harris, is every bit as sparkling as the dialog is flat."

== Awards ==
Mia Farrow won the best actress award and Topol won the best actor award at the San Sebastian International Film Festival.
