= Robert Greenhut =

American film producer

- Born: December 18, 1942 (age 83); New York City, U.S.
- Education: University of Miami
- Occupation: Film producer

Robert "Bob" Greenhut (born December 18, 1942) is an American film producer.

Born in New York City, Greenhut studied music at the University of Miami. He began his film career as a production assistant on Arthur Hiller's 1967 comedy The Tiger Makes Out. During the next seven years, he worked in various production capacities, rising through the ranks to become a production manager, assistant director, and associate producer. Greenhut served in that last capacity on The Front, a 1976 Hollywood blacklist drama starring Woody Allen. It was the first of many collaborations with the writer/director. Greenhut served as the executive producer and production manager of Annie Hall and went on to produce or executive produce every Allen-directed film through to the period musical comedy Everyone Says I Love You in 1996.

Greenhut also has worked extensively with Mike Nichols on Heartburn (1986), Working Girl (1988), Postcards from the Edge (1990), Regarding Henry (1991), and Wolf (1994). His additional credits include Miloš Forman's Hair (1979), Arthur (1981), Martin Scorsese's The King of Comedy (1983), and Penny Marshall's Big (1988), A League of Their Own (1992) and Renaissance Man (1994).

Greenhut received a 1989 Crystal Apple Award from the NYC Mayor's Film Office for his contribution to the city's film industry. That same year, he was honored with the Eastman Kodak Award for lifetime achievement.
