= Geiss (surname) =

Geiss or Geiß (German for a female goat) is a surname of German origin. Notable people with the surname include:

- Anton Geiss (1858–1944), German politician in the Republic of Baden
- Bill Geiss (1858–1924), American baseball player
- Christof Geiß (born 1964), German mathematician
- Doug Geiss (born 1969), American politician from Michigan
- Emil Geiss (1867–1911), American baseball player
- Erika Geiss, American politician from Michigan
- Imanuel Geiss (1931–2012), German historian
- James Geiss (1950–2000), American sinologist, historian, and author
- Johannes Geiss (1926–2020), German physicist
- Karlmann Geiß (1935–2025), German jurist and judge
- Louisette Geiss, American writer, lyricist, and producer
- Michel Geiss, French sound engineer, instrument designer and musician
- Robert Geiss (born 1964), German businessman and TV personality
- Robin Geiss (born 1974), German public international law scholar and academic
- Tony Geiss (1924–2011), American producer, screenwriter, songwriter and author

== See also ==
- Edith Schönert-Geiß (1933–2012), German numismatist
- Pedro Varela Geiss (born 1957), Spanish writer, bookseller and Holocaust denier
- Geis (surname), people with this name
- Geist (surname), people with this name
