= 1820 =

1820 in various calendars
- Gregorian calendar: 1820; MDCCCXX
- Ab urbe condita: 2573
- Armenian calendar: 1269; ԹՎ ՌՄԿԹ
- Assyrian calendar: 6570
- Balinese saka calendar: 1741–1742
- Bengali calendar: 1226–1227
- Berber calendar: 2770
- British Regnal year: 60 Geo. 3 – 1 Geo. 4
- Buddhist calendar: 2364
- Burmese calendar: 1182
- Byzantine calendar: 7328–7329
- Chinese calendar: 己卯年 (Earth Rabbit); 4517 or 4310 — to — 庚辰年 (Metal Dragon); 4518 or 4311
- Coptic calendar: 1536–1537
- Discordian calendar: 2986
- Ethiopian calendar: 1812–1813
- Hebrew calendar: 5580–5581
- Hindu calendars
- Vikram Samvat: 1876–1877
- Shaka Samvat: 1741–1742
- Kali Yuga: 4920–4921
- Holocene calendar: 11820
- Igbo calendar: 820–821
- Iranian calendar: 1198–1199
- Islamic calendar: 1235–1236
- Japanese calendar: Bunsei 3 (文政３年)
- Javanese calendar: 1747–1748
- Julian calendar: Gregorian minus 12 days
- Korean calendar: 4153
- Minguo calendar: 92 before ROC 民前92年
- Nanakshahi calendar: 352
- Thai solar calendar: 2362–2363
- Tibetan calendar: ས་མོ་ཡོས་ལོ་ (female Earth-Hare); 1946 or 1565 or 793 — to — ལྕགས་ཕོ་འབྲུག་ལོ་ (male Iron-Dragon); 1947 or 1566 or 794

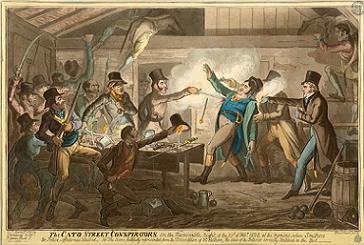
February 23: The Cato Street Conspiracy to assassinate British Prime Minister and his government is thwarted in London.

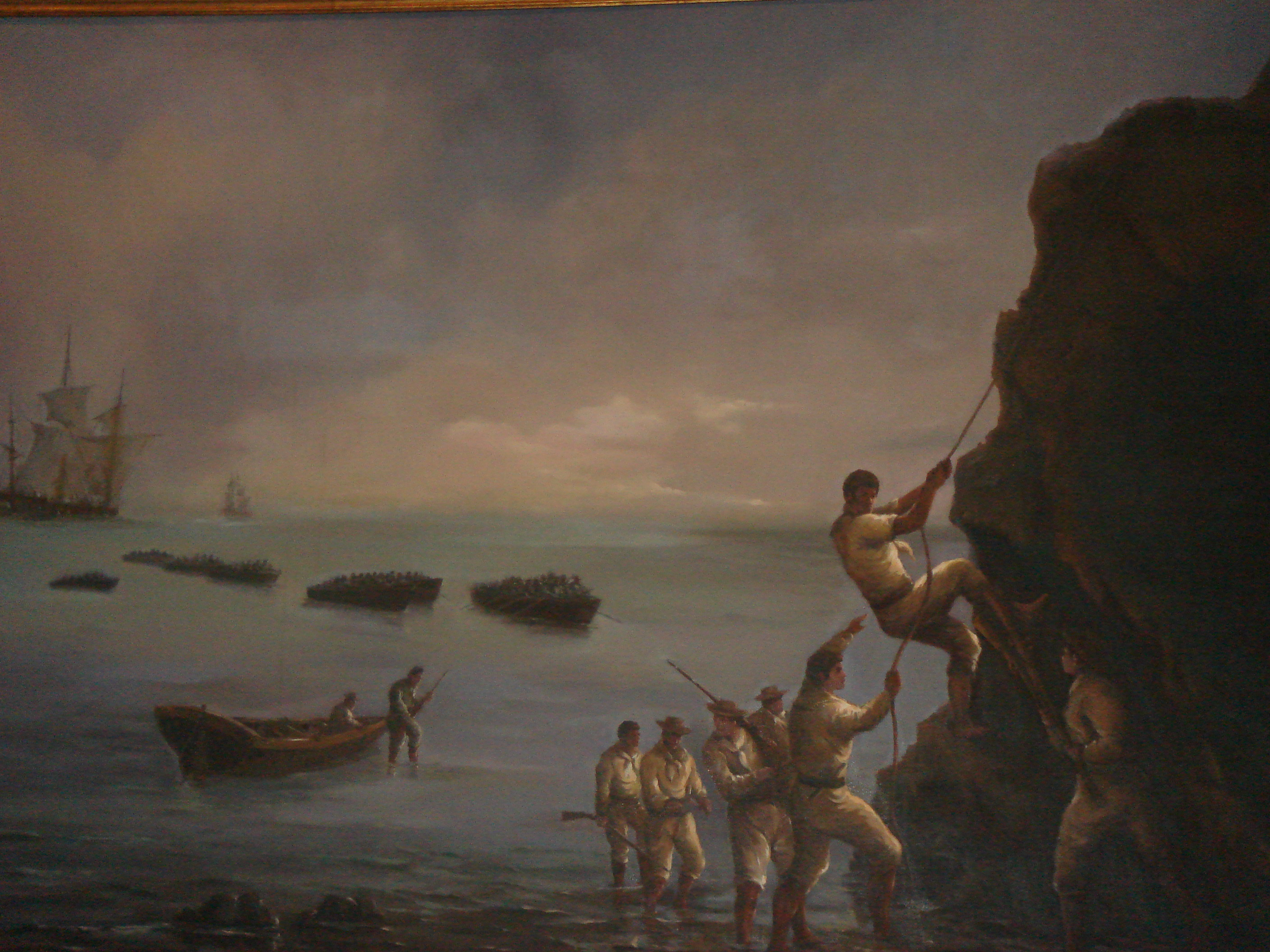
February 6: The Capture of Valdivia is made in Chile.

1820 (MDCCCXX) was a leap year starting on Saturday of the Gregorian calendar and a leap year starting on Thursday of the Julian calendar, the 1820th year of the Common Era (CE) and Anno Domini (AD) designations, the 820th year of the 2nd millennium, the 20th year of the 19th century, and the 1st year of the 1820s decade. As of the start of 1820, the Gregorian calendar was 12 days ahead of the Julian calendar, which remained in localized use until 1923.

== Events ==
=== January–March ===
- January 1 – A constitutionalist military insurrection at Cádiz leads to the summoning of the Spanish Parliament to meet on March 7, becoming the nominal beginning of the "Trienio Liberal" in Spain.
- January 8 – The General Maritime Treaty of 1820 is signed between the sheikhs of Abu Dhabi, Sharjah, Ajman, Umm al-Quwain and Ras Al Khaimah (later constituents of the Trucial States) in the Arabian Peninsula and the United Kingdom.
- January 27 (NS, January 15 OS) – An Imperial Russian Navy expedition, led by Fabian Gottlieb von Bellingshausen in Vostok with Mikhail Petrovich Lazarev, sights the Antarctic ice sheet.
- January 29 – King George IV becomes the new British monarch upon the death his father George III after 59+ years on the throne. The elder George's death ends the 9-year period known as the British Regency.
- January 30 – British Royal Navy captain Edward Bransfield, an Irishman, becomes the first person to positively identify Antarctica as a land mass.
- February 6
  - Capture of Valdivia: Lord Cochrane occupies Valdivia in the name of the Republic of Chile.
  - A group of 86 free African American colonists sail from New York City to Freetown, Sierra Leone, with a goal of creating a home for freed American slaves, to be called "Liberia".
- February 13 – The Assassination of the Duke of Berry takes place in Paris. The Duke of Berry, nephew of Louis XVIII, is stabbed to death while attending the Paris Opera.
- February 14 – Emperor Minh Mạng starts to rule in Vietnam.
- February 20 – A revolt begins against the Spanish crown in Santa María Chiquimula (now in Guatemala).
- February 23 – The Cato Street Conspiracy, a plot to assassinate Britain's Prime Minister, Lord Liverpool, and his Cabinet is thwarted when police in London arrest 13 plotters after being warned by an informant.
- March 3 – A fire in Guangzhou in China burns 15,000 houses and kills an undetermined number of people.
- March 3 and 6 – The Missouri Compromise becomes law, allowing admission of Missouri and Maine, as slave and free states respectively, as U.S. states.
- March 9 – King Ferdinand VII of Spain accepts the new constitution, beginning the Trienio Liberal.
- March 10 – The Astronomical Society of London is founded.
- March 15 – Maine is admitted as the 23rd U.S. state.
- March 26 – Joseph Smith, founder of the Latter Day Saint movement, receives his First Vision in Palmyra, New York.
- March 28 – An attempted coup d'état against Paraguayan dictator José Gaspar Rodríguez de Francia fails after a plot by Fulgencio Yegros and Pedro Juan Caballero.

=== April–June ===
- April 1 – A proclamation, signed "By order of the Committee of Organisation for forming a Provisional Government", begins the "Radical War" in Scotland.
- April 8 – The statue of the Venus de Milo (Aphrodite of Milos, c. 150 BC-125 BC) is discovered on the Greek island of Milos, by a peasant named Yorgos Kentrotas.
- April 12 – Alexander Ypsilantis becomes the leader of Filiki Eteria, a secret organization to overthrow Ottoman rule over Greece.
- April 15 – King William I of Württemberg marries his cousin, Pauline Therese, in Stuttgart.
- April 21 – Hans Christian Ørsted discovers the relationship between electricity and magnetism.
- May 1 – The last judicial decapitation in the United Kingdom is meted out to the principals in the Cato Street conspirators after their public hanging for treason in London. Legally, the post-hanging beheading is a mitigation of the last sentence in Britain of "hanging, drawing and quartering".
- May 11 – HMS Beagle, the ship that will later take young Charles Darwin on his scientific voyage to examine the "origin of the species", is launched at Woolwich Dockyard.
- May 20 – At age 14, John Stuart Mill sets out on his formative trip to the south of France, staying with Samuel Bentham.
- June 5 – Caroline of Brunswick, the estranged wife of King George IV, returns to England after six years abroad in Italy, where she has been carrying on an affair. Since ascending the throne in January, the King had sought to receive his government's approval for a divorce.
- June 12
  - Élie Decazes, leader of the opposition in France's Chamber of Deputies, introduces the "Law of the Double Vote", a proposal to add to the existing legislators by creating 172 seats that would be "selected by special electoral colleges" made up of the wealthiest 25% of voters in each of France's departments.
  - Delegates in St. Louis in the Missouri Territory approve a proposed state constitution, proclaiming that they "do mutually agree to form and establish a free and independent republic, by the name of 'The State of Missouri'."
- June 29 – The cause of action that will lead to the U.S. Supreme Court case known as The Antelope arises, when a U.S. Treasury cutter captures a ship of the same name, which is transporting 281 Africans who had been captured as slaves, in violation of the U.S. law prohibiting the slave trade.

=== July–September ===
- July 13 – A revolt under Guglielmo Pepe forces Ferdinand I of the Two Sicilies to sign a constitution modeled on the Spanish Constitution of 1812.
- July 20 – Saint Cronan's Boys' National School opens in Bray, County Wicklow, Ireland under the title Bray Male School. Its notable pupils will include President of Ireland Cearbhall Ó Dálaigh.
- July 26 – Union Chain Bridge opens across the River Tweed, between England and Scotland. Its span of 449 ft (137 m) is the world's longest for a vehicular bridge at this time.
- August 1 — The Regent's Canal through to the London Docks is opened.
- August 24 – A Constitutionalist insurrection breaks out at Oporto, Portugal.
- September 2 – The Daoguang Emperor succeeds to the throne of Qing dynasty China.
- September 5 – José Gervasio Artigas flees to Paraguay.
- September 15 – Revolution breaks out in Lisbon against John VI of Portugal.

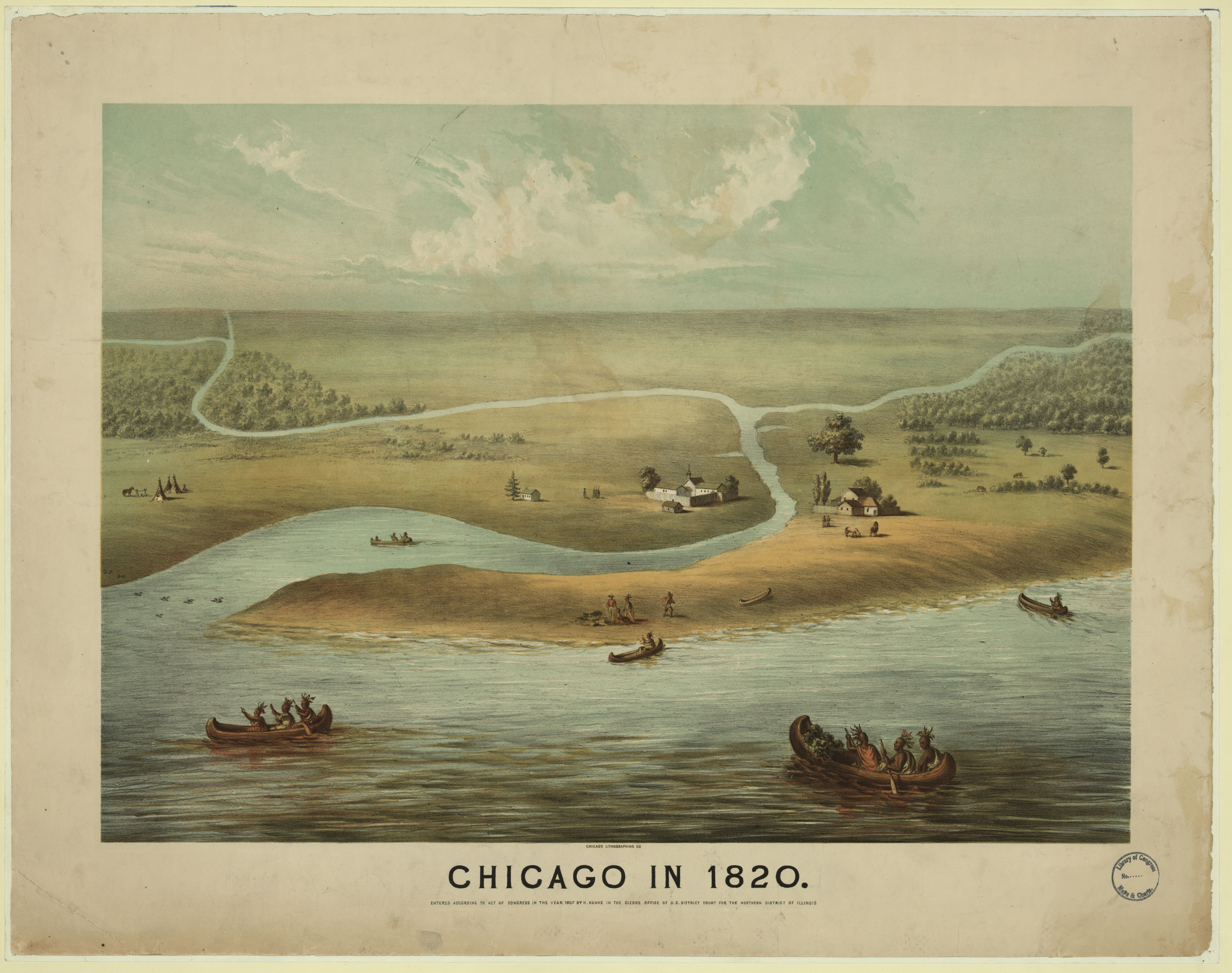
Chicago in 1820

=== October–December ===
- October 9 – Guayaquil declares independence from Spain.
- October 25–November 20 – The Congress of Troppau is convened between the rulers of Russia, Austria and Prussia.
- November 17 – American seal hunter Captain Nathaniel Palmer becomes the third known explorer to sight Antarctica. The Palmer Peninsula is later named after him.
- November 20 – After the sinking of the American whaleship Essex of Nantucket, by a sperm whale in the southern Pacific Ocean, the survivors are left afloat in three small whaleboats. They eventually resort, by common consent, to cannibalism to allow some to survive.
- December 3 – James Monroe is re-elected, virtually unopposed, in the 1820 United States presidential election. One elector, William Plumer of New Hampshire, casts his vote for John Quincy Adams in order to protest the administration of Monroe and Daniel Tompkins while also establishing Adams as a contender for the election in 1824.

=== Date unknown ===
- Mount Rainier erupts over modern-day Seattle.
- 18,957 black slaves leave Luanda, Angola.
- Construction work is completed on the Citadelle Laferrière in Haiti, the largest fortification in the Americas, built on the orders of Henri Christophe to defend the country against potential French reoccupation.
- Anchor coinage is first struck in silver in London denominated in fractions of the Mauritian dollar for use in British colonies.

== Births ==
=== January–June ===
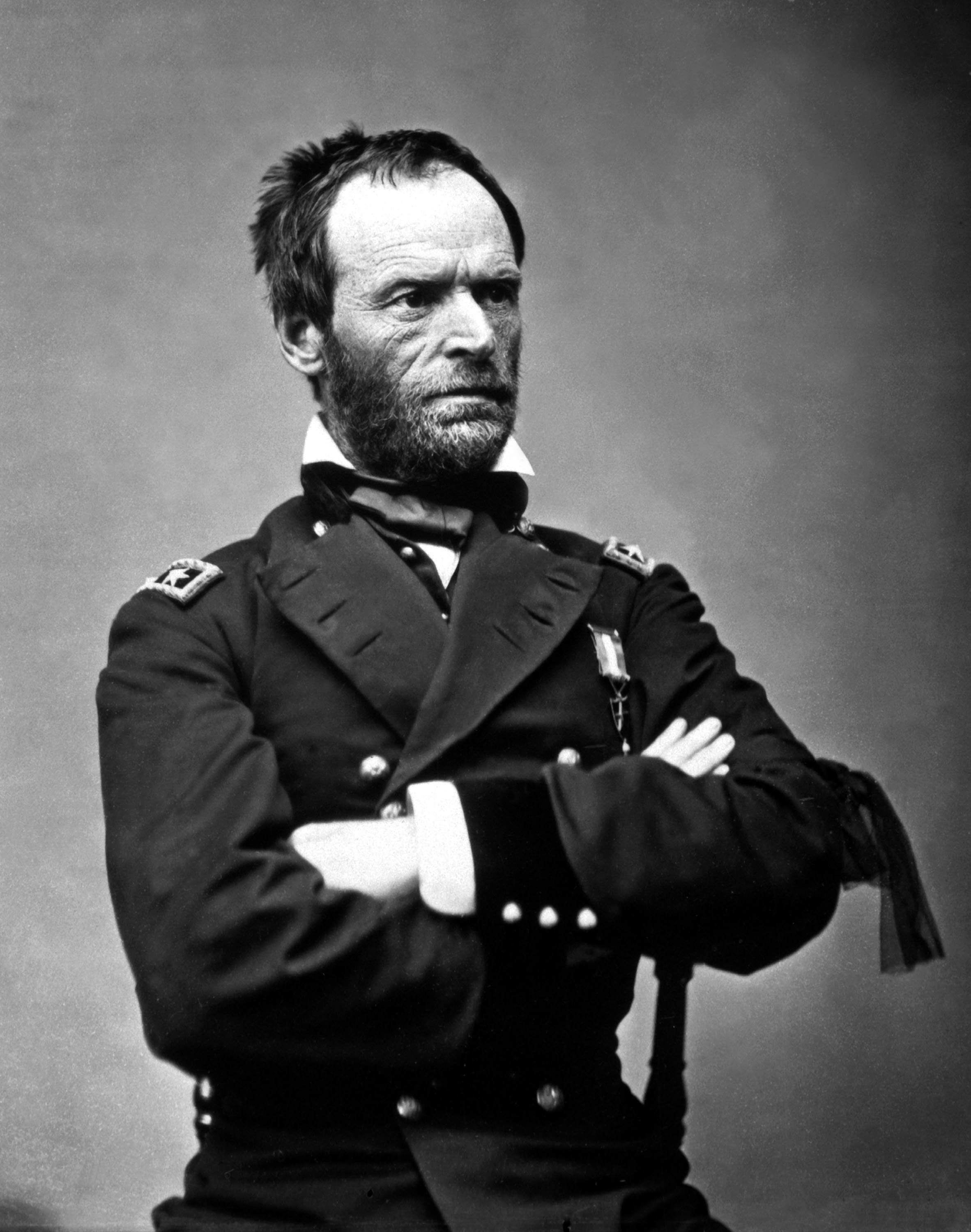
William Sherman

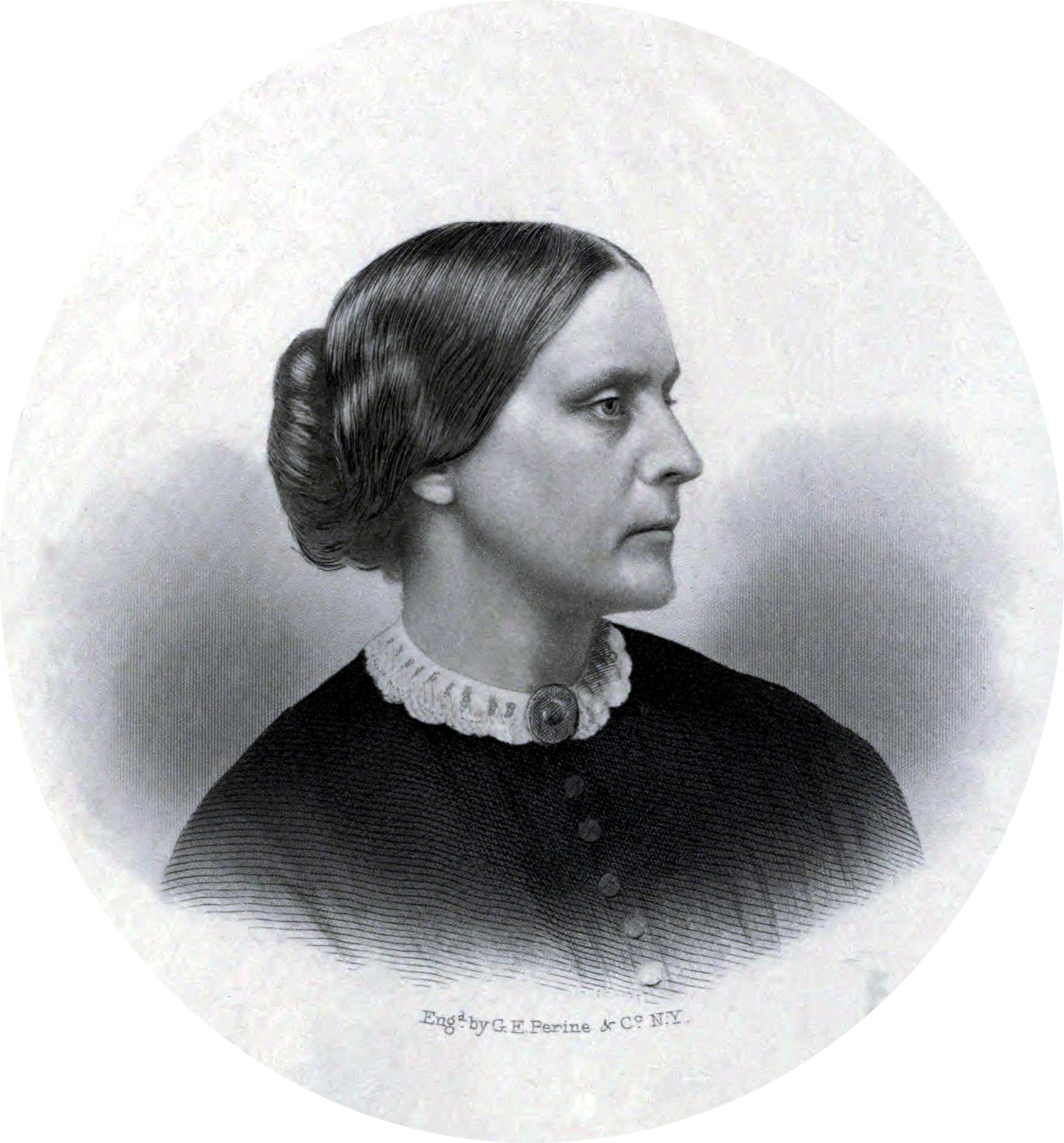
Susan B. Anthony

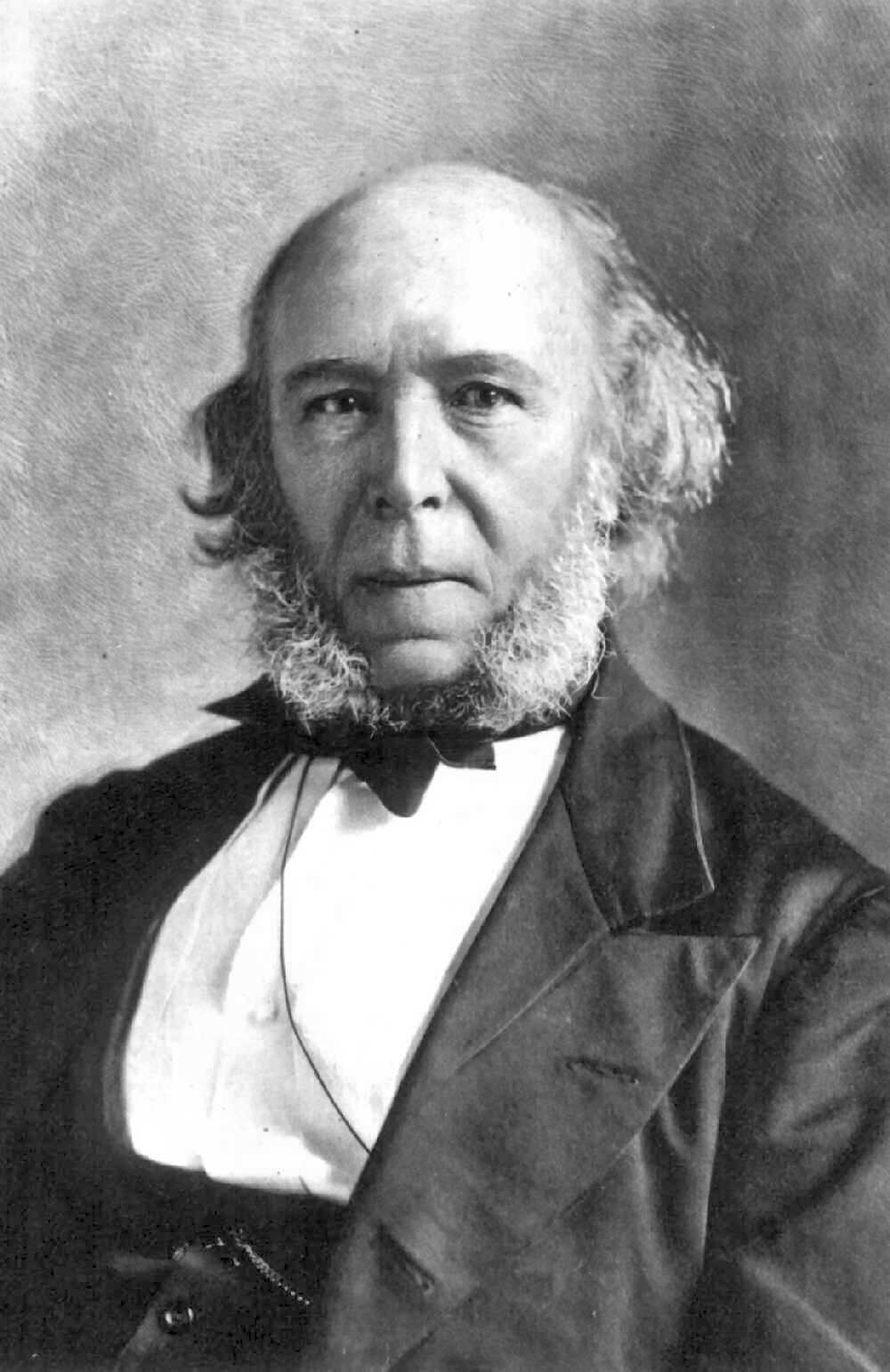
Herbert Spencer

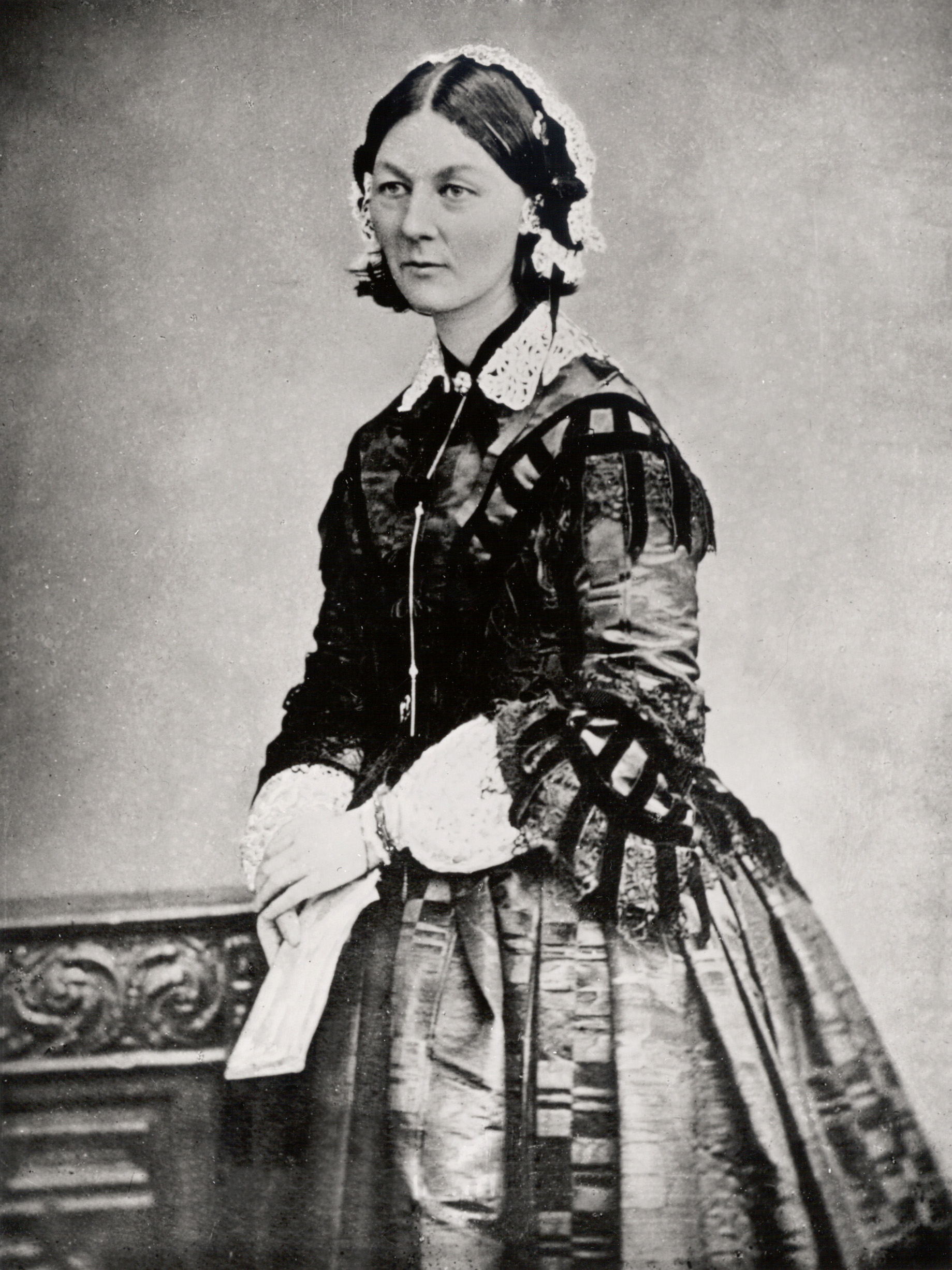
Florence Nightingale

- January 10 – Louisa Lane Drew, actress, prominent theater manager, grandmother of the Barrymores (d. 1897)
- January 14 – Bezalel HaKohen, Russian rabbi (d. 1878)
- January 17 – Anne Brontë, English author (d. 1849)
- January 20 – Alexandre-Émile Béguyer de Chancourtois, French chemist and mineralogist (d. 1886)
- January 30 – Concepción Arenal, Spanish feminist writer, activist (d. 1893)
- February 8 – William Tecumseh Sherman, American Civil War general (d. 1891)
- February 13 – James Geiss, English businessman (d. 1878)
- February 15
  - Susan B. Anthony, American suffragist (d. 1906)
  - Arvid Posse, 2nd Prime Minister of Sweden (d. 1901)
- February 17 – Henri Vieuxtemps, Belgian violinist and composer (d. 1881)
- February 28 – John Tenniel, English illustrator (d. 1914)
- March 2 – Eduard Douwes Dekker, Dutch writer (d. 1887)
- March 3 – Henry D. Cogswell, American temperance movement pioneer who endowed a number of Cogswell fountains (d. 1900)
- March 4 – Francesco Bentivegna, Italian revolutionary (d. 1856)
- March 4 – Alexander Worthy Clerk, Jamaican Moravian teacher and missionary (d. 1906)
- March 9 – Samuel Blatchford, Associate Justice of the Supreme Court of the United States (d. 1893)
- March 14 – Victor Emmanuel II of Italy (d. 1878)
- March 17 – Martin Jenkins Crawford, American politician (d. 1883)
- March 20 – Alexandru Ioan Cuza, Romania's first reigning Domnitor (d. 1873)
- April 27 – Herbert Spencer, English philosopher (d. 1903)
- April 26 – Alice Cary, American poet, sister to Phoebe Cary (1824–1871) (d. 1871)
- May 5 – Elkanah Billings, Canadian paleontologist (d. 1876)
- May 12 – Florence Nightingale, English nurse (d. 1910)
- May 23 – Lorenzo Sawyer, 9th Chief Justice of the Supreme Court of California (d. 1891)
- May 25 – François Claude du Barail, French general and Minister of War (d. 1902)
- May 27 – Mathilde Bonaparte, Italian princess (d. 1904)

=== July–December ===
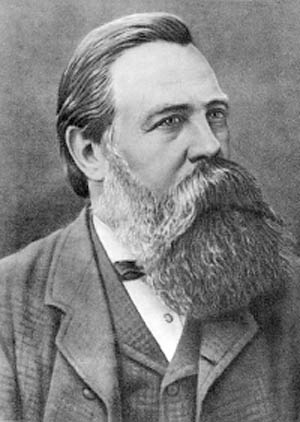
Friedrich Engels

- July 5 – William John Macquorn Rankine, Scottish physicist, engineer (d. 1872)
- July 22 – Oliver Mowat, Canadian lawyer, politician (d. 1903)
- July 23 – Julia Gardiner Tyler, First Lady of the United States (d. 1889)
- July 25 – Henry Doulton, English potter (d. 1897)
- September 17
  - Émile Augier, French dramatist (d. 1889)
  - Earl van Dorn, American Confederate general (d. 1863)
- September 20 – John F. Reynolds, American general (d. 1863)
- September 27 – Wilhelm Siegmund Teuffel, German classical scholar (d. 1878)
- September 29 – Henri, Count of Chambord, claimant to the French throne (d. 1883)
- October 5 – David Wilber, American politician (d. 1890)
- October 6 – Jenny Lind, Swedish soprano (d. 1887)
- October 16 – Gillis Bildt, 5th Prime Minister of Sweden (d. 1894)
- October 20 – Benjamin F. Cheatham, American Confederate general (d. 1886)
- October 22 - Ossian Euclid Dodge, American singer and performer (d. 1876)
- November 23
  - Isaac Todhunter, English mathematician (d. 1884)
  - Ludwig von Hagn, German painter (d. 1898)
- November 28 – Friedrich Engels, German social philosopher (d. 1895)
- December 21 – William H. Osborn, American railroad executive (d. 1894)

=== Date unknown ===
- Song Qing, Chinese general (d. 1902)

== Deaths ==
=== January–June ===
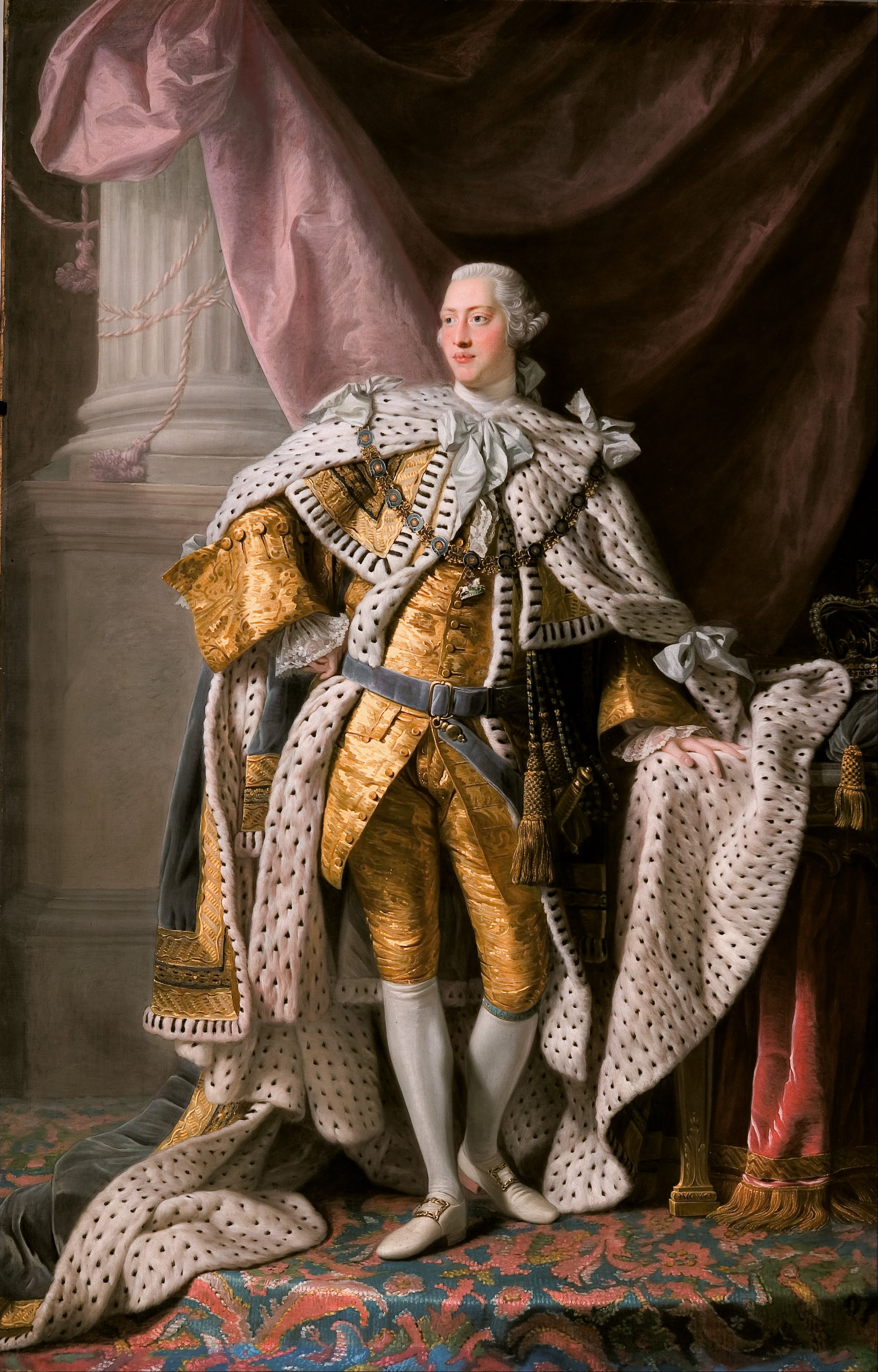
King George III

- January 17 – Daniel Albert Wyttenbach, Swiss-born academic (b. 1746)
- January 23 – Prince Edward, Duke of Kent and Strathearn, member of British Royal Family and father of Queen Victoria (b. 1767)
- January 29 – King George III of the United Kingdom (b. 1738)
- February 5 – William Drennan, Irish physician, poet and radical politician (b. 1754)
- February 11 – Karl von Fischer, German architect (b. 1782)
- February 14 – Charles Ferdinand, Duke of Berry, French noble (stabbed) (b. 1778)
- March 11 – Benjamin West, Anglo-American painter of historical scenes (b. 1738)
- March 22 – Stephen Decatur, American sailor (b. 1779)
- April 8 – Thomas Douglas, 5th Earl of Selkirk, Scottish-born philanthropist (b. 1771)
- April 20 – James Morris III, Continental Army officer from Connecticut (b. 1752)
- May 30 – William Bradley, Britain's tallest ever man (b. 1787)
- June 6 – Henry Grattan, Irish politician (b. 1746)
- June 9 – Wilhelmina of Prussia, Princess of Orange (b. 1751)
- June 19 – Sir Joseph Banks, English naturalist and botanist (b. 1743)
- June 20 – Manuel Belgrano, Argentine politician, general in the Independence War (b. 1770)

=== July–December ===
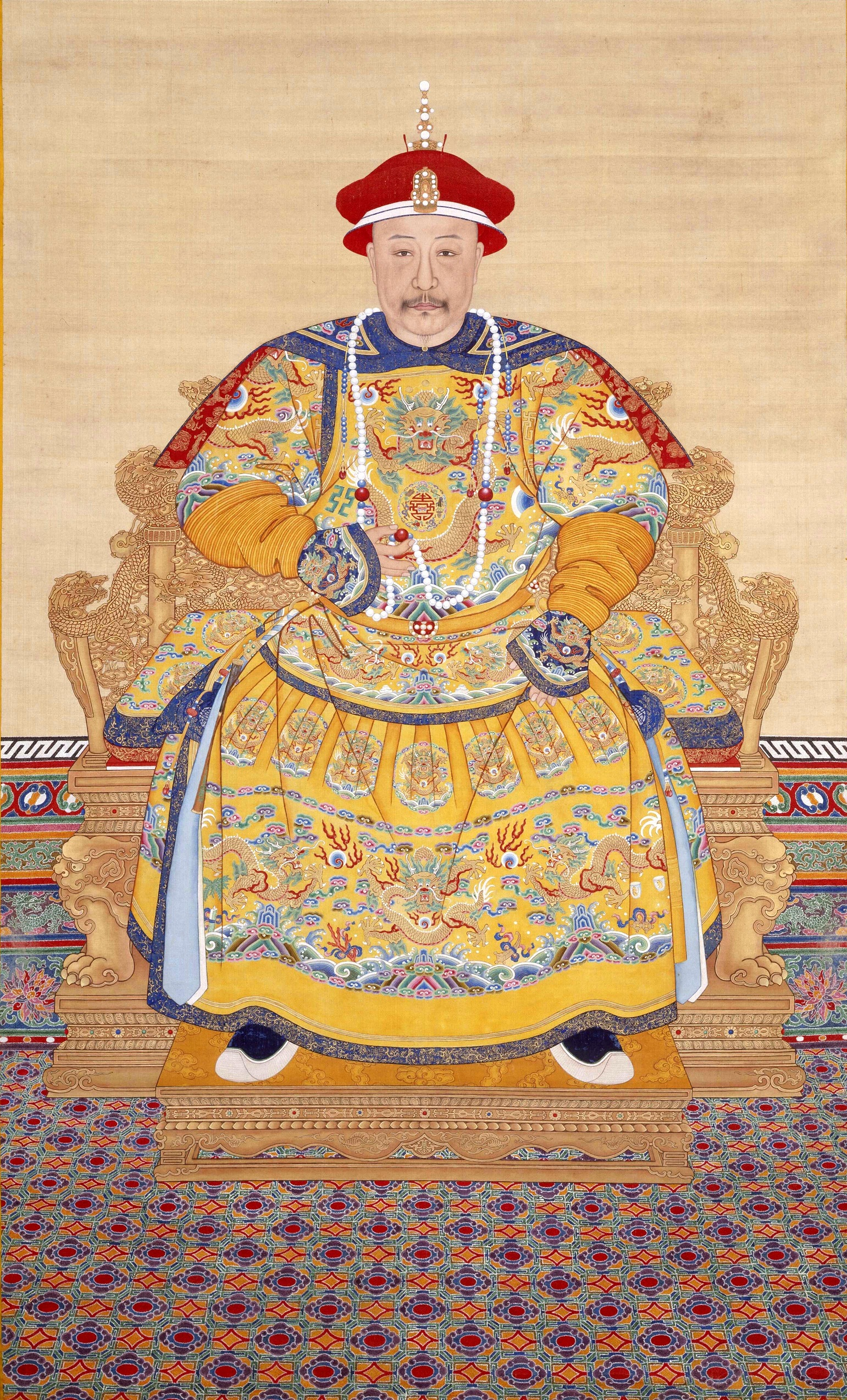
Jiaqing Emperor

- July 10 – William Wyatt Bibb, first Governor of Alabama (b. 1781)
- August 6 – Antonín Vranický, Bohemian violinist and composer (b. 1761)
- August 9 – Anders Sparrman, Swedish naturalist (b. 1748)
- August 12 – Manuel Lisa, Spanish-born American fur trader (b. 1772)
- September 2 – Jiaqing Emperor, Chinese emperor (b. 1760)
- September 3 – Benjamin Latrobe, Anglo-American architect (b. 1764)
- September 4 – Timothy Brown, English banker, merchant and radical (b. 1743/1744)
- September 16 – Nguyễn Du, Vietnamese poet (b. 1766)
- September 18 – Mariana Joaquina Pereira Coutinho, Portuguese courtier, salonnière (b. 1748)
- September 26 – Daniel Boone, American pioneer (b. 1734)
- September 28 – Pedro Andrés del Alcázar, Spanish and later Chilean Army officer and war hero (b. 1752)
- September 29 – Barthelemy Lafon, Creole architect and smuggler (b. 1769)
- October 4 - Claudine Picardet, French chemist, mineralogist, meteorologist and scientific translator (b. 1735)
- October 8 – Henri Christophe, Haitian revolutionary leader (suicide) (b. 1767)
- October 11 – James Keir, Scottish geologist, chemist and industrialist (b. 1735)
- October 15 – Karl Philipp Fürst zu Schwarzenberg, Austrian field marshal (b. 1771)
- November 1 – Pierre Martin, French admiral (b. 1752)
- November 8 – Lavinia Stoddard, American poet and school founder (b. 1787)
- December 25 – Joseph Fouché, French statesman (b. 1759)
- December 29 – Princess Pauline of Anhalt-Bernburg, German regent and social reformer (b. 1769)
