= Geis (surname) =

Geis is a German surname. Notable people with the surname include:

- Bernard J. Geis (1909–2001), American editor and publisher
- Gemma Geis (born 1979), Catalan politician
- George J. Geis (c. 1860–1936), American Baptist minister and anthropologist
- Gerald Geis (1933-2022), American politician
- Gilbert Geis (1925–2012), American criminologist
- Irving Geis (1908–1997), American artist
- Jacob Geis (1890–1972), German theatre director, screenwriter and film producer
- Johannes Geis (born 1993), German footballer
- Norbert Geis (born 1939), German politician
- Paul Geis (1953–2019), Olympic athlete
- Richard E. Geis (1927–2013), American science fiction fan and writer

== See also ==
- Geis, in Irish, an idiosyncratic taboo, whether of obligation or prohibition, similar to being under a vow, with the plural having mystical connotations
- Irish mythology in popular culture § Geis
- Geiss (surname)
- Geist (surname)
