= Harvey Weinstein sexual abuse cases =

Criminal and civil cases since 2017

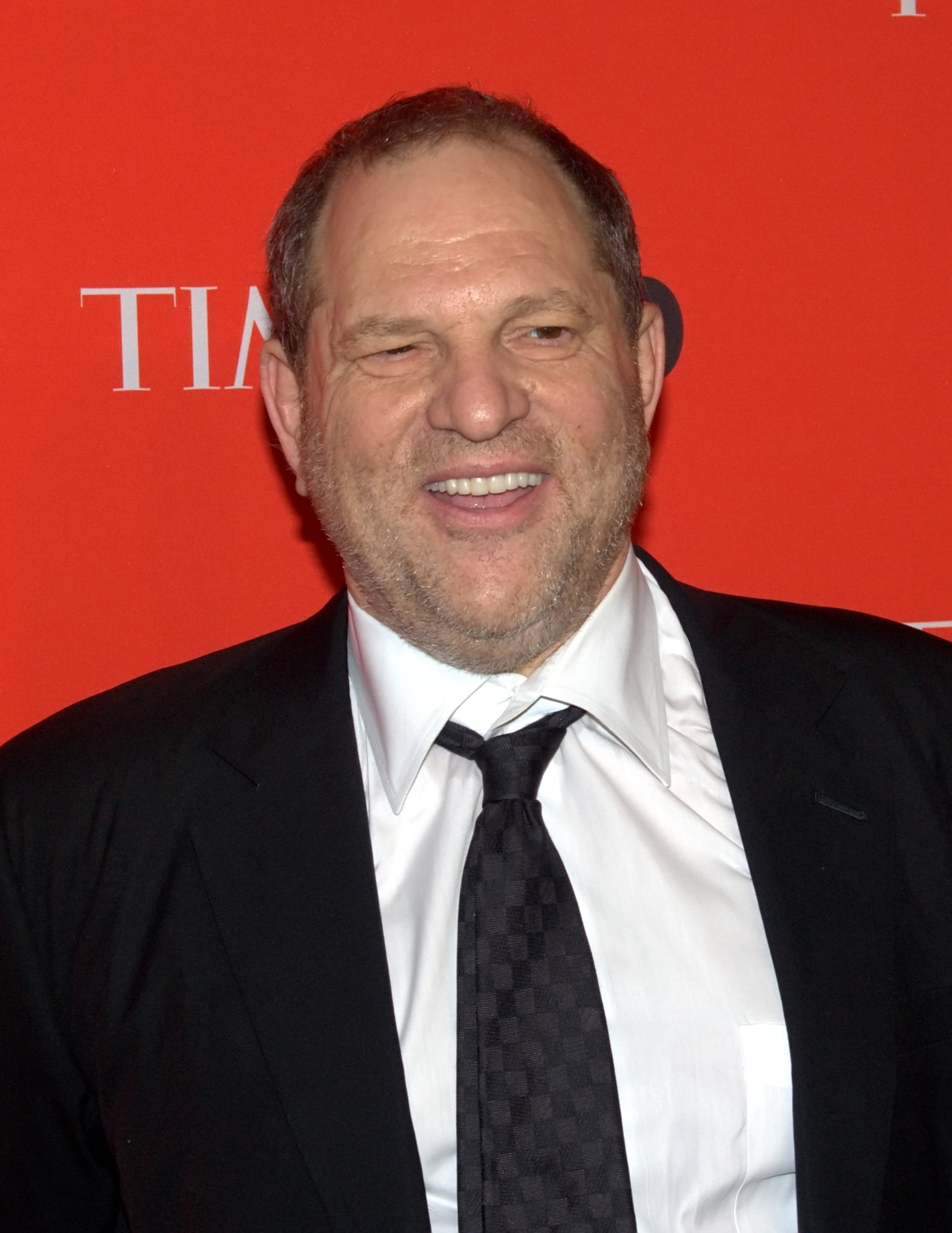
Harvey Weinstein in 2010

In October 2017, The New York Times and The New Yorker reported that dozens of women had accused the American film producer Harvey Weinstein of rape, sexual assault and sexual abuse over a period of at least 30 years. Over 80 women in the film industry eventually accused Weinstein of such acts. Weinstein himself denied "any non-consensual sex". Shortly after, he was dismissed from the Weinstein Company (TWC), expelled from the Academy of Motion Picture Arts and Sciences and other professional associations, and retired from public view.

Criminal investigations into complaints from at least six women took place in Los Angeles, New York City, and London. In May 2018, Weinstein was arrested in New York and charged with rape and other offenses. In 2020, he was found guilty of rape in the third degree and a criminal sexual act, and was sentenced to 23 years of imprisonment, but that conviction was overturned on appeal in 2024 because of procedural errors. In 2025, Weinstein was convicted of one count of sexual assault in the retrial. He was sentenced to 16 more years after being convicted in Los Angeles of one count of rape and two counts of sexual assault, which he also appealed. In June 2026, Weinstein's rape charge concerning Jessica Mann was dropped following hung juries at two trials and Mann's unwillingness to pursue a fourth trial.

The New York Times and The New Yorker were awarded the 2018 Pulitzer Prize for Public Service for their coverage of Weinstein. The scandal triggered many similar allegations against powerful men around the world, leading to the ousting of many from their positions. It also led numerous women to share their own experiences of sexual assault, harassment, or rape on social media under the hashtag #MeToo. The scandal's impact on powerful men in various industries came to be called the Weinstein effect.

== Background ==
Harvey Weinstein and his brother, Bob Weinstein, formed the film production company Miramax and led it from 1979 to 2005, at which point they left to run The Weinstein Company (TWC), which they had founded in March 2005.

Rumors of Harvey Weinstein's "casting couch" practices (soliciting sexual favors from a job applicant in exchange for employment) circulated in Hollywood for years, and entertainment figures at times alluded to them. As early as 1998, Gwyneth Paltrow said on Late Show with David Letterman that Weinstein "will coerce you to do a thing or two". In 2005, Courtney Love advised young actresses in an interview, "If Harvey Weinstein invites you to a private party in the Four Seasons, don't go." In 2010, an article titled "Harvey's Girls" for Pajiba alluded to Weinstein's "casting couch" reputation: "Every few years, Harvey picks a new girl as his pet." In 2012, a character on the television series 30 Rock said: "I'm not afraid of anyone in show business: I turned down intercourse with Harvey Weinstein on no less than three occasions – out of five." While announcing the 2013 nominees for the Best Supporting Actress Academy Award, Seth MacFarlane joked: "Congratulations, you five ladies no longer have to pretend to be attracted to Harvey Weinstein." After the allegations were published, director Quentin Tarantino said that he had known about Weinstein harassing actresses for decades, and had confronted him about it. Ivana Lowell wrote in her book Why Not Say What Happened?, published in 2010, about misbehavior by Weinstein when she worked for the books division of Miramax. The incidents described were in her office when she was alone with Harvey Weinstein, and in her home when a female friend of hers was present. She wrote that she "knew about Harvey's reputation as a womanizer; tales of his trying to seduce every young actress in town were infamous".

Journalists wrote or attempted to write about Weinstein's alleged behavior. David Carr found that no one allegedly assaulted by Weinstein would speak on the record; Ken Auletta and his editors decided he could not mention an assault allegation without cooperation from the victim. In 2015, Jordan Sargent wrote in his Gawker article "Tell Us What You Know About Harvey Weinstein's 'Open Secret'" that "rumors of the powerful producer leveraging his industry power for sexual satisfaction—consensual or otherwise—have tended to remain unaired, confined to hushed conversation and seedier gossip-blog comment threads." The New York Times later wrote that Weinstein had built a "wall of invulnerability", in part through his support of leading Democratic politicians. He boasted being friends with Bill and Hillary Clinton, and Barack Obama. The Clintons continued longstanding close relationships with him despite alleged warnings about Weinstein to Hillary Clinton's presidential campaign from Lena Dunham and Tina Brown.

In 2015, The New York Times reported that Weinstein was questioned by police "after a 22-year-old woman accused him of touching her inappropriately". The woman, Italian model Ambra Gutierrez, cooperated with the New York City Police Department (NYPD) to obtain an audio recording where Weinstein admitted to having inappropriately touched her. As the police investigation progressed and became public, tabloids published negative stories about Gutierrez that portrayed her as an opportunist. American Media, publisher of the National Enquirer, allegedly agreed to help suppress the allegations by Gutierrez and Rose McGowan. Manhattan District Attorney Cyrus Vance Jr. decided not to file charges against Weinstein, citing insufficient evidence of criminal intent, against the advice of local police who considered the evidence sufficient. The New York district attorney's office and the NYPD blamed each other for failing to bring charges.

In July 2018, after many allegations and criminal charges of sexual misconduct, Greek journalist Taki Theodoracopulos said to The Spectator that his friend Weinstein told him in an interview, "Yes, I did offer them [girls] acting jobs in exchange for sex, but so did and still does everyone." Weinstein's lawyer later said he had been present, and Weinstein did not make that statement. Theodoracopulos stated he "may have misrepresented" Weinstein. Weinstein's quotes and some of the author's observations were later removed from the article which only appeared on the magazine's website.

== 2017 reports ==
Substantial allegations of sexual misconduct by Weinstein were first reported by The New York Times journalists Jodi Kantor and Megan Twohey on October 5, 2017. The story accused Weinstein of three decades of sexually harassing and paying eight settlements to actresses and female production assistants, temps, and other employees who worked at Miramax and TWC. The investigation, which came on the heels of a successful exposé of Bill O'Reilly by The New York Times, had taken roughly five months.

Five days later, on October 10, longtime NBC News correspondent Ronan Farrow reported in The New Yorker further allegations that Weinstein had sexually assaulted or harassed thirteen women and raped three. Farrow said he had wanted to break the story months earlier with NBC, but implied the network was under pressure not to publish, which NBC denied. According to Farrow, 16 former or current executives and assistants connected with Weinstein said they had witnessed or had been informed of Weinstein's non-consensual sexual advances to women. Four actresses relayed their suspicion that, after rejecting Weinstein's advances and complaining about him, he had them removed from projects or persuaded others to remove them. A number of Farrow's sources said Weinstein had referred to his success in planting stories in the media about individuals who had crossed him. The New Yorker also published the 2015 audio recording in which Weinstein admits to groping Gutierrez.

In November 2017, Farrow reported that Weinstein had, through the lawyer David Boies, employed private intelligence agencies Kroll and Black Cube and private investigator Jack Palladino to spy on and influence Weinstein's alleged victims as well as Kantor, Twohey, Farrow and other reporters who were investigating Weinstein. He took these actions, according to Farrow, to prevent his sexual conduct from becoming public.

== Victims and accusers ==
Since the initial reporting in 2017, over 80 women accused Weinstein of sexual harassment, assault, or rape. In November 2017, a group of the alleged victims, led by Italian actress Asia Argento, released a list of over 100 alleged instances of sexual abuse by Weinstein. The incidents in the list date from 1980 to 2015 and include eighteen allegations of rape.

According to the women's reports, Weinstein invited young actresses or models into a hotel room or office on the pretext of discussing their career, and then he demanded massages or sex. He told them that complying with his demands would help their careers and repeatedly used Gwyneth Paltrow as an example, telling them that she had had sex with him, unbeknownst to the actress. Paltrow had rebuffed his propositions, but he told multiple young actresses that she had slept with him as a "weapon" to pressure them into complying with his demands.

Former colleagues and collaborators of Weinstein told reporters that these activities were enabled by employees, associates and agents who set up these meetings, as well as lawyers and publicists who suppressed complaints with payments and threats. Bob Weinstein, for example, was allegedly involved in three settlements with accusers, the first in 1990. One Miramax executive reported being harassed by Weinstein after being promoted and praised by him; she and other employees allegedly found that the HR department protected Weinstein more than they did his employees.

On May 29 and July 9, 2024, Weinstein returned to a New York courthouse, where he was told that he could face charges related to additional sex abuse allegations. During the July 9, 2024, court appearance, it was revealed that prosecutors were investigating whether or not to bring additional criminal charges against Weinstein for other sex abuse allegations. However, despite the ongoing investigation, no new indictment was immediately made against Weinstein.

=== Sexual harassment or assault ===
Weinstein has sexually assaulted at least three women. He was initially convicted in 2020 of raping aspiring actress Jessica Mann and sexually assaulting Miriam Haley, a production assistant. The Jessica Mann verdict was overturned on appeal. Following two retrials at which the jury failed to reach a verdict, charges of rape of Mann were dropped in June 2026. In 2022, he was convicted of raping and sexually assaulting an unnamed woman who later revealed herself to be Evgeniya Chernyshova, a former model and actor.

Women who said they had been inappropriately touched, sexually harassed or assaulted by Weinstein include:

1. Amber Anderson, actress
2. Lysette Anthony, actress
3. Asia Argento, actress and director
4. Rosanna Arquette, actress
5. Jessica Barth, actress
6. Kate Beckinsale, actress
7. Juls Bindi, massage therapist
8. Cate Blanchett, actress (Note: Blanchett said she had been harassed by Weinstein, though she would not elaborate.)
9. Helena Bonham Carter, actress
10. Zoë Brock, model
11. Cynthia Burr, actress
12. Liza Campbell, writer and artist
13. Alexandra Canosa, producer
14. Rowena Chiu, Weinstein employee
15. Marisa Coughlan, actress and writer
16. Hope Exiner d'Amore, Weinstein employee
17. Florence Darel, actress
18. Wedil David, actress
19. Emma de Caunes, actress
20. Paz de la Huerta, actress
21. Juliana De Paula, model
22. Cara Delevingne, actress and model
23. Sophie Dix, actress
24. Jane Doe, model and aspiring actress
25. Lacey Dorn, actress and filmmaker
26. Kaitlin Doubleday, actress
27. Caitlin Dulany, actress
28. Dawn Dunning, actress
29. Lina Esco, actress and director
30. Alice Evans, actress
31. Lucia Evans, formerly Lucia Stoller, actress
32. Angie Everhart, model and actress
33. Claire Forlani, actress
34. Romola Garai, actress
35. Louisette Geiss, screenwriter and actress
36. Louise Godbold, nonprofit organization director
37. Judith Godrèche, actress
38. Trish Goff, former model, actress, and real estate broker
39. Larissa Gomes, actress
40. Heather Graham, actress
41. Eva Green, actress
42. Ambra Gutierrez, formerly Ambra Battilana, model
43. Daryl Hannah, actress
44. Salma Hayek, actress and producer
45. Lena Headey, actress
46. Anne Heche, actress
47. Paris Hilton, media personality and socialite
48. Lauren Holly, actress
49. Dominique Huett, actress
50. Jessica Hynes, actress, director and writer
51. Amy Israel, Miramax executive
52. Angelina Jolie, actress and director
53. Ashley Judd, actress and political activist
54. Minka Kelly, actress
55. Katherine Kendall, actress
56. Heather Kerr, actress
57. Mia Kirshner, actress
58. Myleene Klass, singer and model
59. Nannette Klatt, actress
60. Liz Kouri, actress
61. Olga Kurylenko, model and actress
62. Jasmine Lobe, actress
63. Emma Loman (alias), German actress
64. Ivana Lowell, author and daughter of Lady Caroline Blackwood
65. Laura Madden, Weinstein employee
66. Madonna, musician and actress
67. Natassia Malthe, actress
68. Julianna Margulies, actress
69. Brit Marling, actress
70. Sarah Ann Masse, actress, comedian, and writer
71. Ashley Matthau, actress
72. Rose McGowan, actress
73. Crystal McKinney, former model and actress
74. Natalie Mendoza, actress
75. Sophie Morris, administrative assistant
76. Katya Mtsitouridze, TV hostess and head of Russian film body Roskino
77. Emily Nestor, Weinstein employee
78. Jennifer Siebel Newsom, documentary filmmaker and actress
79. Connie Nielsen, actress
80. Kadian Noble, actress
81. Lupita Nyong'o, actress
82. Lauren O'Connor, Weinstein employee
83. Julia Ormond, actress
84. Gwyneth Paltrow, actress
85. Samantha Panagrosso, former model
86. Zelda Perkins, Weinstein employee
87. Vũ Thu Phương, actress and businesswoman
88. Sarah Polley, actress, writer, and director
89. Emanuela Postacchini, actress
90. Monica Potter, actress
91. Aishwarya Rai, actress
92. Tomi-Ann Roberts, professor of psychology and former aspiring actress
93. Lisa Rose, Miramax employee
94. Erika Rosenbaum, actress
95. Melissa Sagemiller, actress
96. Annabella Sciorra, actress
97. Léa Seydoux, actress
98. Lauren Sivan, TV journalist
99. Chelsea Skidmore, actress and comedian
100. Mira Sorvino, actress
101. Kaja Sokola, model
102. Tara Subkoff, actress
103. Melissa Thompson, marketing strategist
104. Uma Thurman, actress
105. Paula Wachowiak, Weinstein employee
106. Wende Walsh, model and aspiring actress
107. Paula Williams, actress
108. Sean Young, actress

=== Rape ===
Weinstein has raped at least two women, having been convicted of raping Jessica Mann and an unnamed woman, later revealed to be Evgeniya Chernyshova. Women who have accused Weinstein of rape include:

1. Lysette Anthony told British police in October 2017 that Weinstein raped her in the late 1980s at her home in London.
2. Asia Argento told The New Yorker that in 1997, Weinstein invited her into a hotel room, "pulled her skirt up, forced her legs apart, and performed oral sex on her as she repeatedly told him to stop".
3. Wedil David, an actress, said that in 2016, Harvey Weinstein raped her in a Beverly Hills hotel room.
4. Paz de la Huerta said Weinstein had raped her on two separate occasions in November and December 2010.
5. Lucia Evans said, after a business meeting in 2004, Weinstein forced her to perform oral sex on him.
6. Hope Exiner d'Amore, a former employee of Weinstein, said he raped her during a business trip to New York in the late 1970s.
7. Miriam "Mimi" Haleyi, a production crew member, said Weinstein forcibly performed oral sex on her in his New York City apartment in 2006 when she was in her twenties.
8. Dominique Huett said Weinstein forcibly performed oral sex on her and then carried out another sexual act in front of her.
9. Natassia Malthe said in 2008, Weinstein barged into her London hotel room at night and raped her.
10. Rose McGowan wrote on Twitter that she told the Amazon Studios head Roy Price that Weinstein had raped her, but Price ignored this and continued collaborating with Weinstein. Price later resigned from his post following sexual harassment allegations against him.
11. In a lawsuit filed in 2025, Crystal McKinney, a former model accused Harvey Weinstein of plying her and a friend with alcohol in a Manhattan hotel room in 2003, then forcing them to perform sexual acts on each other before raping them.
12. Annabella Sciorra said that, in the early 1990s, Weinstein forced himself into her apartment, shoved her onto her bed and raped her.
13. Melissa Thompson, a tech entrepreneur, told Sky News Weinstein raped her in his hotel room following a business meeting in 2011.
14. Wende Walsh, model and aspiring actress said that when she was working as a waitress at an Elmwood Avenue bar in the late 1970s, Weinstein begged her for a ride and then once inside the car, he sexually assaulted her.
15. An unnamed woman told The New Yorker that Weinstein invited her into a hotel room on a pretext, and "forced himself on [her] sexually" despite her protests.
16. An anonymous woman who works in the film industry says in a civil claim she filed in the U.K. in November 2017 that he sexually assaulted her several times sometime after 2000.
17. An unnamed Canadian actress says he sexually assaulted her in 2000. She filed suit against him in 2017.
18. An unnamed actress sued Weinstein for sexual battery and assault, alleging that in 2016 he forced her into sex.

== Weinstein's response ==
In response to The New York Times report in 2017, Weinstein said: "I appreciate the way I've behaved with colleagues in the past has caused a lot of pain, and I sincerely apologize for it." He said he was due to take a sabbatical and was working with therapists to "deal with this issue head on". His consulting lawyer, Lisa Bloom, described him as "an old dinosaur learning new ways". Bloom was criticized for her handling of Weinstein's defense and ended her involvement for Weinstein on October 7, 2017. Two days later, Weinstein hired public relations company Sitrick and Company, which specializes in crisis PR; they dropped Weinstein as a client on April 3, 2018. Weinstein's attorney Charles Harder, who was then known for filing the suit that bankrupted Gawker, said his client would be suing The New York Times, but by October 15, 2017, Harder was no longer working for Weinstein.

In response to the report in The New Yorker, a spokesperson for Weinstein said:

Any allegations of non-consensual sex are unequivocally denied by Mr. Weinstein. Mr. Weinstein has further confirmed that there were never any acts of retaliation against any women for refusing his advances ... Mr. Weinstein has begun counseling, has listened to the community and is pursuing a better path. Mr. Weinstein is hoping that if he makes enough progress, he will be given a second chance.

Subsequent reports and accusations of rape were likewise met with the response that "any allegations of nonconsensual sex are unequivocally denied by Mr. Weinstein."

On January 30, 2018, Weinstein's attorney released private emails from Ben Affleck and Jill Messick, Rose McGowan's former manager, that both contradicted McGowan's version of the incident. Both the released emails and McGowan's own accusations against Messick led to increased negative public and media attention towards Messick, including cyberbullying. On February 7, 2018, Messick committed suicide; her family blamed Weinstein, McGowan, the media and the public for her death.

In March 2018, Weinstein's lawyer Benjamin Brafman said in an interview with The Times (UK): "The casting couch in Hollywood was not invented by Harvey Weinstein. ... If a woman decides that she needs to have sex with a Hollywood producer to advance her career and actually does it and finds the whole thing offensive, that's not rape." Addressing these women, Brafman said, "You made a conscious decision that you're willing to do something that is personally offensive in order to advance your career."

Writers from The Michigan Daily and Quartz described Weinstein's defense as gaslighting for orchestrating extraordinary efforts to undermine the perceptions and reality of women he sexually preyed upon, the journalists investigating their stories, and the public. He hired Lisa Bloom, the high-profile attorney who represented women sexually abused by Bill Cosby and women who accused Bill O'Reilly, and Donald Trump of sexual misconduct, for her expertise, including intimate knowledge of how to prey on the vulnerabilities of sexual abuse survivors. Journalist Ronan Farrow has alleged that NBC did not air his investigation of Weinstein because Weinstein threatened to disclose the sexual indiscretions of NBC's The Today Show host Matt Lauer and MSNBC's president, Phil Griffin. Farrow also alleges that Weinstein retained the Israeli private intelligence and cyber-espionage firm, Black Cube, which Forbes characterizes as the "Mossad" of the "business world", to uncover vulnerabilities to dissuade journalists who were closing in on Weinstein from going public. Weinstein granted interviews to the New York Post to tout his contributions to society including helping women advance in Hollywood and his work on a charity concert that raised $100 million for the 9/11 first responders through the Robin Hood Foundation.

== Criminal prosecutions ==
=== Police investigations ===
In October 2017, the New York City Police Department (NYPD), London's Metropolitan Police Service (MPS) and the Los Angeles Police Department (LAPD) were reviewing allegations against Weinstein following reports about his conduct. The London investigation—dubbed "Operation Kaguyak"—reportedly investigated fifteen alleged sexual assaults by Weinstein, dating back to the 1990s. The UK Crown Prosecution Service has authorized charging Weinstein over alleged indecent assaults that are claimed to have happened in 1996.

=== New York trial, conviction, and reversal ===
On November 3, 2017, the New York City Police Department (NYPD) were preparing a warrant to arrest Weinstein for his alleged rape of Paz de la Huerta, an investigation still pending as of May 2018 and unrelated to the later arrest of Weinstein.

On May 25, 2018, Weinstein was charged by the New York County District Attorney's Office with "rape, criminal sex act, sex abuse and sexual misconduct for incidents involving two separate women". After surrendering to the NYPD, he was arrested and appeared in the New York City Criminal Court before Judge Kevin McGrath. Weinstein was released the same day on a $1 million bail. He agreed to surrender his passport and wear an ankle monitor confining him to Connecticut and New York. In July 2018, Weinstein was indicted on an additional charge of "predatory sexual assault" against a woman he allegedly forced into oral sex in 2006. On October 11, 2018, a judge dismissed one of the sex assault charges.

Weinstein was initially represented by Benjamin Brafman, but parted ways with Brafman in January 2019, and hired Donna Rotunno as his defense counsel. He hired prison consultant Craig Rothfeld in February 2020. Weinstein was tried in February 2020 in Manhattan Supreme Court. At the trial, six women testified that Weinstein had sexually assaulted them; the charges themselves rested on the complaints of two women, a former production assistant and a former actress, who gave the jury accounts from 2006 and 2013, respectively. On February 24, 2020, the jury found Weinstein guilty of rape in the third degree and a criminal sexual act in the first degree, and not guilty on three counts, including two more serious charges of predatory sexual assault. The convictions resulted from the case of "Jane Doe 1", later revealed to be Evgeniya Chernyshova, a Russian model and actress living in Italy. She testified that she attended the 2013 Italian Film Festival in Los Angeles when Weinstein came uninvited to her hotel room; after she opened the door, he eventually raped her in the bathroom.

After the verdict, Weinstein was remanded to jail, where he was housed in Rikers Island's infirmary unit. Justice James A. Burke sentenced Weinstein to 23 years in prison on March 11, 2020. Weinstein was 67 years of age and in poor health at the time of sentencing. On March 18, 2020, he was transferred to Wende Correctional Facility.

==== Appellate proceedings ====
On June 2, 2022, a unanimous five-judge panel of the New York Supreme Court Appellate Division, First Judicial Department rejected Weinstein's appeal against his sentence. His attorneys announced an appeal to the New York Court of Appeals. Oral proceedings before that court took place in February 2024.

On April 25, 2024, the New York Court of Appeals overturned the convictions. The Court of Appeals said the trial judge had made "egregious errors" by admitting the testimony of other alleged victims of Weinstein's about acts for which he was not charged, as prohibited by People v. Molineux (1901). The Court of Appeals ordered a retrial of the rape allegations.

==== Retrials ====
On July 19, 2024, a court hearing was held where Judge Curtis Farber ruled that Weinstein would be retried and tentatively set for the retrial to start on November 12, 2024. However, a plan to try Weinstein in September 2024 still remains an option. The plan to start Weinstein's retrial in September was presented shortly after his conviction was overturned. Weinstein's lawyers have stated they want the retrial to be as soon as possible. Farber stated that the start date of the retrial would depend on pre-trial discoveries. On September 12, 2024, a New York grand jury indicted Weinstein on new charges, as announced by prosecutors from the Manhattan District Attorney's office. The specific charges remain unknown, as the indictment is sealed and will be revealed during Weinstein's arraignment. The jury selection process for the retrial began on April 15, 2025. Opening statements and witness testimony would then begin on April 23, 2025. Jury deliberations in the retrial began on June 5, 2025. On June 11, 2025, Weinstein was found guilty of one count of criminal sexual act and not guilty of another. On June 12, 2025, Weinstein obtained a mistrial on an additional rape charge following tensions between the jury foreman and other jurors. On May 15, 2026, following the conclusion of his second retrial for the Jessica Mann case, another mistrial was declared after the jury remained deadlocked and couldn't reach a verdict. In spite of this, the prosecution was granted the authority to determine whether or not to go with through with another retrial, with a hearing then set for June 24, 2026 to determine whether or not another retrial would be sought for Mann's case.

==== Dismissal of Jessica Mann case ====
On June 25, 2026, Manhattan District Attorney Alvin Bragg declared that Weinstein would not receive a fourth criminal trial for the alleged rape of Jessica Mann, with Mann also being unwilling to testify for a fourth trial. However, Weinstein remains convicted on separate conviction he received in New York and California.

=== Los Angeles criminal charges ===
On January 6, 2020, the Los Angeles County District Attorney announced separate criminal charges against Weinstein, allegedly raping one woman and sexually assaulting another in separate incidents over a two-day period in 2013. Weinstein was charged with one felony count each of forcible rape, forcible oral copulation, sexual penetration by use of force and sexual battery by restraint. On April 10, 2020, Weinstein was charged with sexual battery by restraint against a third victim, related to an incident in 2010. On October 2, 2020, Weinstein was charged with another six additional sexual assault charges from three more incidents in Beverly Hills hotel rooms: three counts of forcible rape and three counts of forcible oral copulation.

On April 12, 2021, Weinstein was formally indicted on eleven counts of sexual assault in Los Angeles County; this was a procedural matter allowing the trial to proceed more quickly. On the same day, Weinstein appeared at a video hearing regarding his extradition to California. On July 20, 2021, Weinstein was extradited to California to face charges of rape and sexual assault. He was flown to Los Angeles and taken to the Twin Towers Correctional Facility.

The trial in Los Angeles commenced in October 2022. Weinstein was charged with 11 counts of rape, forcible oral copulation, and sexual battery, stemming from alleged acts between 2004 and 2013. He was found guilty of three of seven charges (four of the initial 11 charges were dropped) on December 19, 2022. Convictions included charges of rape, forced oral copulation, and third degree sexual misconduct. On February 23, 2023, Weinstein was sentenced to an additional 16 years in prison for these convictions. He was then returned to New York to Mohawk Correctional Facility. Weinstein, who was required to remain in prison because of the Los Angeles convictions, was eventually returned back to New York's Riker's Island in April 2024 when plans were made to retry him for the New York convictions which were overturned.

== Civil lawsuits ==
On October 23, 2017, New York Attorney General Eric Schneiderman opened a civil rights investigation into TWC. He issued a subpoena for records related to sexual harassment and discrimination complaints at the company. In February 2019, the NY Attorney General filed suit against Weinstein and the Weinstein Co. for failing to protect its employees from sexual harassment.

In January 2018, Weinstein's former personal assistant Sandeep Rehal sued both Weinstein brothers and TWC for discrimination and harassment, alleging that much of her work involved "catering to Harvey Weinstein's sexual appetites and activities", including working while he was naked. Weinstein denied these allegations.

On April 30, 2018, Ashley Judd sued Weinstein for allegedly making false statements about her after she rejected his sexual requests, which damaged her career and cost her a role in a Lord of the Rings movie.

A class action lawsuit had been filed against Weinstein by several of his alleged victims in December 2017. On May 24, 2019, multiple press reports stated Weinstein had offered to settle civil lawsuits against him for $44 million. Judge Alvin Hellerstein rejected the class action settlement in July 2020, criticizing several of the terms including that "Harvey Weinstein can get a defense fund ahead of the claimants is obnoxious". In January 2021 a new $17 million settlement was agreed to in bankruptcy court.

In March 2021, actress Hayley Gripp sued Weinstein alleging that Weinstein sexually assaulted her in a suite at Beverly Hills hotel room in November 2012 when she was 19 years old. Weinstein has denied the allegation.

In December 2021, a federal judge dismissed a racketeering lawsuit Rose McGowan filed against Harvey Weinstein and others.

In February 2023, the victim "Jane Doe #1" (later revealed to be Evgeniya Chernyshova) in Weinstein's Los Angeles criminal conviction filed a civil suit against Weinstein. The case was later put on hold pending the outcome of Weinstein's appeal in the criminal case.

In January 2024, a lawsuit alleging sexual assault was filed against Weinstein in the U.S. District Court by former massage therapist Kellye Croft. In her lawsuit, Croft also alleged New York Knicks and New York Rangers owner James Dolan set her up to be molested by Weinstein after bringing her to California.

== Reactions ==
Weinstein's alleged actions were widely criticized by prominent persons in entertainment and politics. They triggered a public discussion about, as the Academy of Motion Picture Arts and Sciences (AMPAS) put it, "willful ignorance and shameful complicity in sexually predatory behavior and workplace harassment" in the film industry.

=== Business and professional associations ===
On October 8, 2017, TWC board of directors dismissed Weinstein, and he resigned from the company's board nine days later. In the wake of the scandal, TWC declared Chapter 11 bankruptcy in March 2018. After Weinstein's ouster was announced, several companies ended their collaborations with TWC, including Apple (October 9), Hachette (October 12), Amazon (October 13), Lexus and Ovation (October 25). The AMPAS, the British Academy of Film and Television Arts (BAFTA), the Producers Guild of America (PGA), and the Academy of Television Arts & Sciences (ATAS) also stripped Weinstein of their memberships.

=== Politics ===
Prominent politicians condemned Weinstein's actions. Hillary Clinton, Barack Obama and Michelle Obama denounced Weinstein's reported behavior on October 10, 2017. French President Emmanuel Macron initiated the revocation of Weinstein's Legion of Honour title. In the United Kingdom, Labour members of parliament requested the revocation of Weinstein's Commander of the Order of the British Empire honorary title. Several politicians Weinstein had supported gave his donations to charities, including Democratic Senators Al Franken, Patrick Leahy, and Martin Heinrich.

=== Other reactions ===
Weinstein's wife Georgina Chapman announced her divorce on October 10, 2017. That month, the University at Buffalo, Weinstein's alma mater, revoked his honorary degree, and Harvard University rescinded Weinstein's 2014 W. E. B. Du Bois medal. On New Year's Day 2018, more than three hundred Hollywood actresses and other women published an open letter in the daily newspapers The New York Times and La Opinión appealing to support the Time's Up initiative.

Musician and actress Madonna, who worked with Weinstein on several films, said in an interview with The New York Times Magazine, "Harvey crossed lines and boundaries and was incredibly sexually flirtatious and forward with me when we were working together." She also said she was aware of his behavior like a lot of other women in the entertainment industry, but because he was powerful and successful, few spoke out against him.

== Impact ==
=== In the United States ===
The October 2017 allegations against Weinstein precipitated an immediate "national reckoning" against sexual harassment and assault and systemic sexism in the United States, known as the "Weinstein effect". Compounded by other sexual harassment cases earlier in the year, the Weinstein reports and the subsequent "#MeToo" hashtag campaign, which encouraged individuals to share their suppressed stories of sexual misconduct, created a cavalcade of allegations across multiple industries that brought about the swift ousting of many men in positions of power both in the United States and, as it spread, around the world. On October 15, 2017, deceased actress Misty Upham's father, Charles Upham, went public with allegations that his daughter was raped by a member of Weinstein's production team at the same Golden Globes ceremony where she was honored for her work on one of Weinstein's films, and that other members of Weinstein's team had not only witnessed the rape but had cheered the rapist.

In the entertainment industry, allegations led to the ousting of actors and directors alike. Most prominently, actor Kevin Spacey, comedian Louis C.K., and filmmaker Brett Ratner had projects canceled following at least six allegations apiece. Over two hundred women accused filmmaker James Toback of sexual harassment. In journalism, allegations led to the expelling of editors, publishers, executives, and hosts. In other industries, celebrity chef John Besh and other executives in finance and public relations were removed. As of November 25, 2017, the Los Angeles Police Department was investigating twenty-eight sex crime cases involving media figures.

Time magazine dubbed the "Silence Breakers" behind the #MeToo movement Time Person of the Year in 2017. American journalists in conversation at NPR wrote of the series of allegations feeling like a tipping point for societal treatment of sexual misconduct, distinguished from prior sexual misconduct public debates by the public trust put in the celebrity accusers, as opposed to prior cases of publicly unknown accusers. Other journalists doubted that the trend would hold.

In April 2018, The New York Times and The New Yorker were awarded the Pulitzer Prize for Public Service "for their coverage of the sexual abuse of women in Hollywood and other industries around the world". In 2019, the documentary Untouchable was released, featuring interviews from several of Weinstein's accusers, including Rosanna Arquette and Paz de la Huerta. On September 10, 2019, a nonfiction book written by Jodi Kantor and Megan Twohey called She Said: Breaking the Sexual Harassment Story That Helped Ignite a Movement was published, which follows the process of their investigation, both behind the scenes and in public. In 2022, the book was made into a film adaptation She Said.

=== Internationally ===
The "Me Too" campaign spread to other countries and languages over social media in Africa, Asia, Europe, Latin and North America. In North America, Canadian comedy festival founder Gilbert Rozon resigned and over a dozen individuals accused Quebec television host and producer Éric Salvail of sexual misconduct. In Europe, allegations against multiple British politicians created a public scandal and led to the suspension and resignations of three officials. In France, political organizations close to the Socialist Party, in particular the Union Nationale des Étudiants de France (UNEF), were accused of systemic sexual harassment. The French daily newspaper Le Monde published in November 2017 two articles on alleged sexual harassment and predation supported by former UNEF presidents, Jean-Baptiste Prévost and Emmanuel Zemmour. In an editorial, more than eighty UNEF female members and militants came forward to accuse it of "sexual violence".

== See also ==
- Roger Ailes
