= A Synchronic Chinese-Western Daily Calendar: 1341–1661 A.D. =

Calendar conversion table (1984)

- Editor: Edward L. Farmer
- Author: Keith Hazelton
- Series: Ming Studies Research Series
- Published: 1984
- Publisher: University of Minnesota
- ISBN: 978-1886108004
- Text: A Synchronic Chinese-Western Daily Calendar: 1341–1661 A.D. online

A Synchronic Chinese-Western Daily Calendar: 1341–1661 A.D. is a calendar conversion table generated by computer, published in 1984. It allows the conversion of dates in the Chinese calendars used during the Ming dynasty (1368–1644) into the Julian calendar (before 1582) and the Gregorian calendar (after 1582). A Synchronic Chinese-Western Daily Calendar can also be described as a concordance (對照表; Duìzhàobiǎo).

== Structure ==
A Synchronic Chinese-Western Daily Calendar uses the Ming calendar from 1341–1643 and the Qing calendar from 1644–1661. In the Ming era, it is based on the Da Tong Shu, while in the Qing era it is based on the Shi Xian Shu. It covers not only the entire Ming dynasty, but also the insurrections in the late Yuan which led to the founding of the Ming and the gradual collapse of the Southern Ming rump states. However, it does not cover 1662–1683, when the Zheng dynasty continued to use the Ming calendar on Taiwan.

Earlier concordances, like the Jinshi Zhongxishi Ri Duizhao Biao (Note: Chinese: 近世中西史日對照表; lit. 'Early modern Chinese-Western history date concordance table' by Zheng Hesheng (鄭鶴聲) published in Nanjing in 1936) and A Sino-Western Calendar For Two Thousand Years 1-2000 A. D., (Note: Chinese: 兩千年中西歷對照表; pinyin: Liangqiannian Zhongxili Duizhaobiao; lit. 'Two-thousand-year Chinese-Western calendar concordance table' by Ouyang Yi (歐陽頤)) have limitations that make them slightly inconvenient. The former only begins in 1516, while the latter does not include sexegenary day names, (Note: Also called "cyclical signs") which must be derived by a "simple calculation". These challenges led to A Synchronic Chinese-Western Daily Calendar being based on Chung-kuo nien-li tsung-p'u (中國年曆總譜; Zhongguo Nianli Zongpu), published in 1960 by Dong Zuobin, though it also corrects small errors in Dong's work. Dong gave the sexagenary date and Western date for the first day of each month, which Keith Hazelton was able to "flesh out" using a computer to cover every day of the calendar.

Every page of the book corresponds to one civil year. Each day is denoted by the number of its lunar month (with intercalary months denoted by a '+' sign and the number of the preceding month), the sexagenary sign of the day, the number of the day in the month, and the corresponding Julian or Gregorian year, month, and day.

== Reception ==
Used to convert all dates in volumes 7 and 8 of The Cambridge History of China, (Note: Except dates where only a year is known, where no precise conversion is possible, since each Chinese lunisolar year overlaps with slightly with the following Western year.) work was supported by Frederick W. Mote, James Geiss, and Denis Twitchett; Twitchett helped secure funding for it, including a grant from the National Endowment for the Humanities to the Cambridge History of China Project. Publication costs were covered by the Association for Asian Studies.

Stephen H. West described A Synchronic Chinese-Western Daily Calendar was described as "a precise and accurate Sino-Western calendar" and "easy to use". The first (1984) edition of A Synchronic Chinese-Western Daily Calendar contained some printing errors, resolved in the revised edition of 1985.

Heinrich Busch, a sinologist at the Society of the Divine Word at Sankt Augustin, wrote that A Synchronic Chinese-Western Daily Calendar "reflects the growing specialization in historical studies on China, the demand for ever more convenient working tools, and the aid the computer is able to provide in developing these tools".

== Works cited ==
- Hazelton, Keith (1984). A Synchronic Chinese-Western Daily Calendar: 1341–1661 A.D. (PDF) (Second Printing, Revised ed.). Minneapolis: University of Minnesota.
- Mote, Frederick W.; Twitchett, Denis, eds. (1988). The Cambridge History of China, Volume 7: The Ming Dynasty, 1368–1644, Part 1. Cambridge: Cambridge University Press. ISBN 978-0-521-24332-2.
- Twitchett, Dennis; Mote, Frederick W., eds. (1998). The Cambridge History of China, Volume 8: The Ming Dynasty, 1368–1644, Part 2. Cambridge: Cambridge University Press. ISBN 978-0-521-24333-9.
