= Geiss =

Geiss may refer to:

- Geiss (surname), people named Geiss, or Geiß
- 18032 Geiss, an asteroid
- Geiss, Menznau, a village in the Menznau municipality, Switzerland
