= Geidt =

Geidt is a surname. Notable people with the surname include:

- Christopher Geidt, Baron Geidt (born 1961), Private Secretary to Queen Elizabeth II
- Jeremy Geidt (1930–2013), English-born American actor, comedian, and acting coach

== See also ==
- Geist (surname)
