= Carmen Geiss =

German businesswoman

Carmen Geiss (born Schmitz, May 5, 1965 in Cologne) is a German entrepreneur, fitness trainer, singer, television actress and former model. She is married to Robert Geiss, with whom she appears in the television show Die Geissens - Eine schrecklich glamouröse Familie.

== Biography ==
Carmen Geiss comes from Cologne. She was voted "Miss Fitness" in 1982. Between 1994 and 1996, she appeared as Rudi Carrell's companion on Rudi's vacation show.

In 1994, she married the entrepreneur Robert Geiss, in whose company she had worked for a time as a saleswoman and with whom she has daughters Davina (* 2003) and Shania (* 2004).

Since January 2011, she has starred with Robert Geiss in the television show Die Geissens - Eine schrecklich glamouröse Familie, which depicts the life of their family. She sang the theme song Jet Set for the series.

In May 2013, together with her husband and ghostwriter Andreas Hock, she published the autobiography Von nix kommt nix, which reached the Spiegel bestseller list. One month later, she released her second solo single My City Miami, which was developed and produced by Harald Reitinger. In June 2013, Geiss performed the song on ZDF-Fernsehgarten. She took part in the seventh season of Let's Dance (RTL) and finished in third place.

In December 2014, Carmen Geiss presented her own fitness and nutrition program, which she has been actively marketing ever since. Geiss is also the managing director of Roberto Geissini Verwaltungs GmbH, the management company of the fashion label of the same name, which she runs together with her husband Robert Geiss. In May 2021, she won against Claudia Effenberg in the ProSieben show Schlag den Star.

Since 2022, she and her husband have owned an apartment in Dubai in addition to their residence near Monaco and a country house near St. Tropez. On June 14, 2025, on Sunday night, four armed men broke into the property in Saint-Tropez, stole valuables and injured Mr. and Mrs. Geiss.

== Discography ==
=== Albums ===
- 2016: Der Burner

=== Singles ===
- 2011: Ne, was ist das schön (with Jürgen Drews)
- 2011: Jet Set
- 2013: My City Miami (with C.G. Project)
- 2015: Was kostet die Welt?
- 2016: Without a Warning
- 2017: Island In The Caribbean
- 2017: Christmas Fever (with Aneta Sablik, Bars and Melody & Johnny Orlando)
- 2018: Er gehört uns beiden nicht mehr (with Aneta Sablik / Doris Russo)
- 2019: Echter Freund (with Michael Rauscher)
