= Donna Rotunno =

American criminal defense lawyer

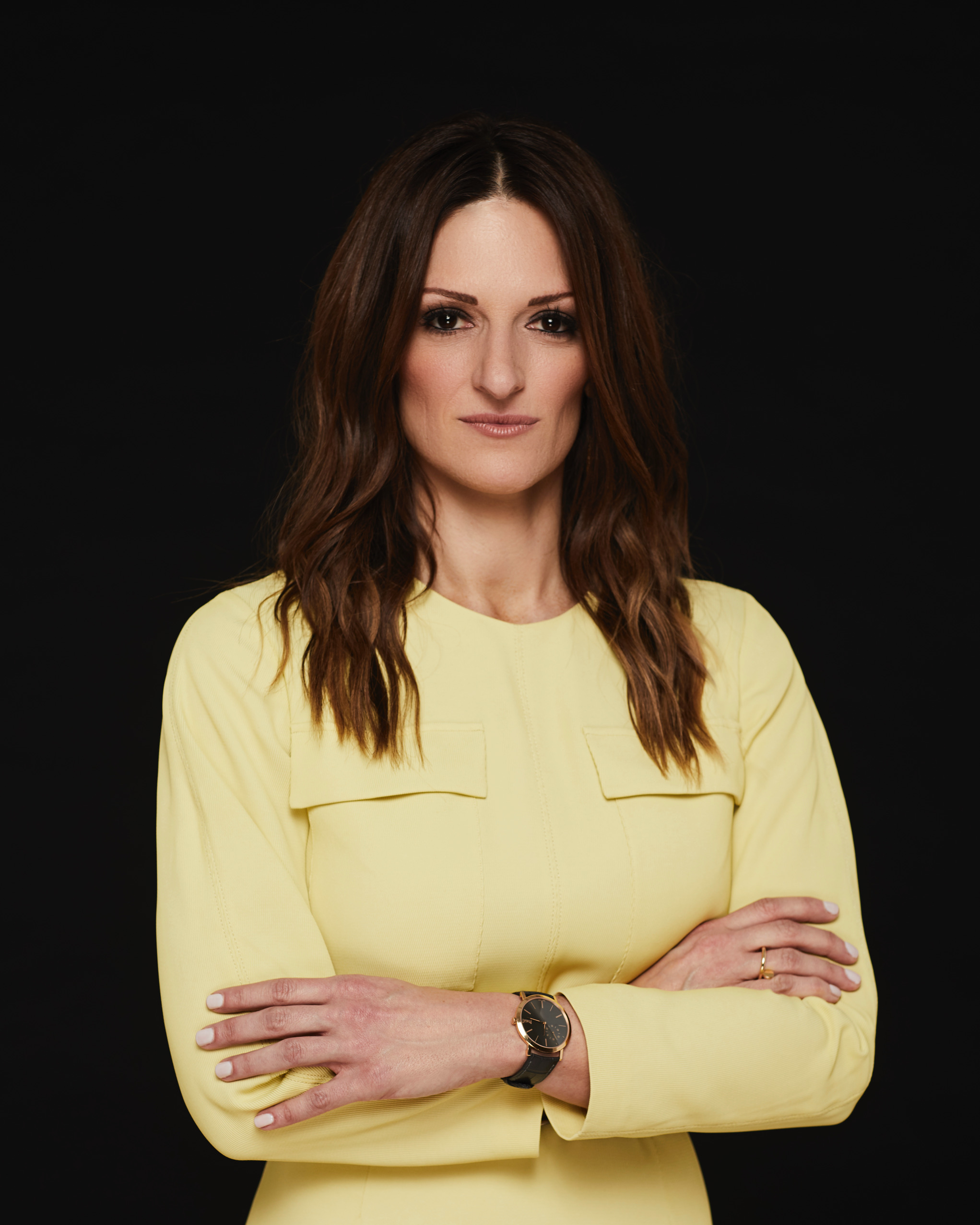
Donna Rotunno in 2020

Donna A. Rotunno is an American criminal defense lawyer, who lives and works in Chicago, IL. She is best known for her work defending men accused of sexual assault, particularly the unsuccessful defense of Harvey Weinstein in his New York trial for criminal sexual assault and rape. During the Weinstein trial, Rotunno came out as an opponent of the Me Too movement (#MeToo) as well as an advocate for due process. Up until Weinstein's conviction in February 2020, Rotunno had only ever lost one sexual assault case.

== Early life and education ==
Rotunno was born in the western suburbs of Chicago, the daughter of a food industry executive and an elementary school teacher. She attended the Immaculate Heart of Mary High School, Westchester, Illinois, the University of Illinois at Urbana–Champaign, Rosary College where she earned a BA. She matriculated to Chicago-Kent College of Law where she earned a JD in 2000, and was subsequently admitted to Illinois Bar.

== Career ==
Rotunno began her legal career as a prosecutor in the Cook County State's Attorney's Office. She litigated cases in several divisions of the Circuit Court of Cook County, before leaving to become a private criminal defense attorney. In 2005, she became the principal member of her own law firm in Chicago, the Law Offices of Rotunno & Giralamo, PC. She currently works out of the Marquette Building in the Chicago Loop.

In 2011, Rotunno represented former Chicago Bears' defensive back Shaun Gayle, who was under investigation for the murder of his pregnant girlfriend, Rhoni Reuter. Gayle was ultimately not charged for the murder and eventually, a woman by the name of Marni Yang was convicted of the crime. In 2013, Rotunno successfully defended prominent Chicago-based fashion designer Elhadji "Haj" Gueye from charges of sexual assault and rape. The following year, she successfully defended Stanley Stallworth, a former partner at the renowned law firm Sidley Austin, who had been accused of sexual assault. In 2016, Rotunno represented Mohammad Abdullah Saleem, a cleric and founder of the Institute for Islamic Education in Elgin, Illinois. Saleem was charged with sexual abuse of one child and one woman, he eventually agreed to a plea deal and received probation.

Rotunno says that her gender has allowed her to defend clients successfully. She has said men can be excellent lawyers, but "if [one] goes at that woman with the same venom that I do, he looks like a bully. If I do it, nobody even bats an eyelash."

=== Harvey Weinstein case ===
In July 2019, Rotunno was hired by Harvey Weinstein. After being hired by Weinstein, she brought on colleague and frequent collaborator, Damon Cheronis, to assist along with local counsel Arthur Aidala of the law firm Aidala, Bertuna, & Kamins, PC. During the trial, Rotunno was a vocal advocate for Weinstein, speaking out against his accusers and the #MeToo movement, making remarks such as "The emotion of this case has taken over. There is a truth you have not reported on." Throughout the duration of the trial, Rotunno's style and choice of clothing was closely covered by media sources who noted her penchant for designer clothing.

Rotunno received backlash for her comments made to reporter Megan Twohey during an interview for The New York Times's podcast The Daily when she was asked whether she had ever been the victim of a sexual assault. Rotunno responded, "I have not because I would never put myself in that position." Rotunno said she believed that Weinstein was not guilty, despite what the media may say, clarifying he was only guilty of infidelity. Rotunno and her legal team were successful in securing a not guilty verdict on three counts including two more serious charges of predatory sexual assault. She said the sentence was harsher than some convicted murderers, and asked the court to take Weinstein's health into consideration.
