= Ambra Gutierrez =

Italian model (born 1992)

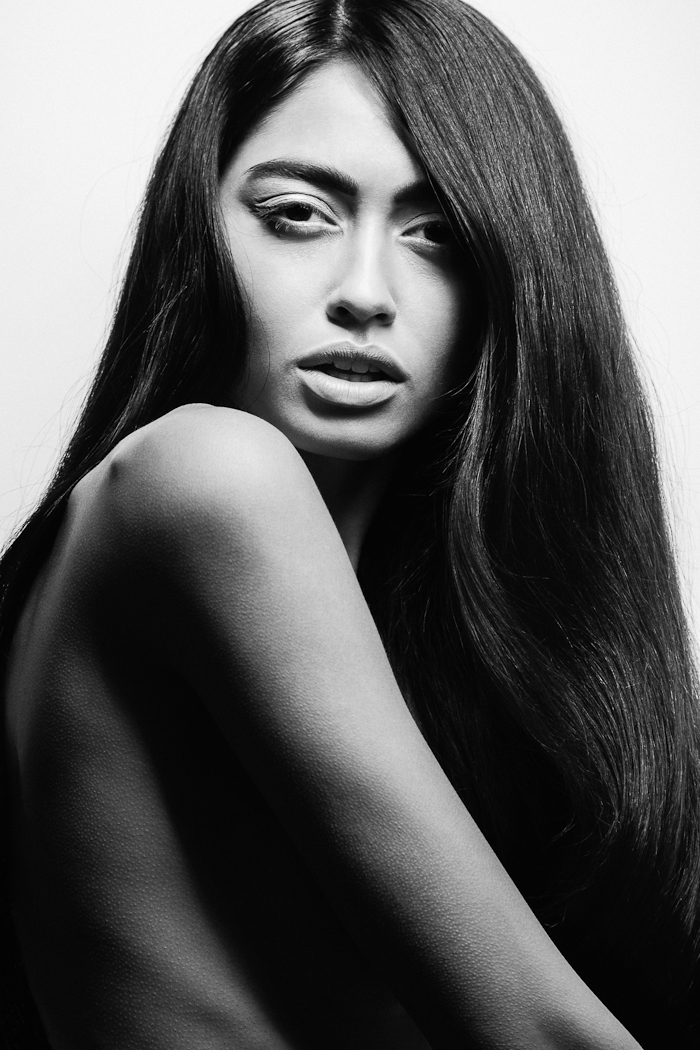
- Ambra Gutierrez in 2013, photographed by Stefano Brunesci
- Born: Ambra Battilana Gutierrez; 15 May 1992 (age 34); Turin, Italy
- Modeling information
- Eye color: Brown

Ambra Battilana Gutierrez (born 15 May 1992) is an Italian model who was a finalist for Miss Italy, and has been featured in GQ Italy. She was formerly Miss Piedmont. She was widely covered by American media for her part in exposing sexual abuse allegations against Harvey Weinstein.

== Early life ==
Ambra Gutierrez was born in Turin, Piedmont, to an Italian father and a Filipino mother. She received her high school diploma at ITPG Guarino Guarini School, where her degree was in land surveying.

== Career ==
In 2010, just after she turned 18, Ambra Battilana was brought by her manager to a bunga bunga party associated with Silvio Berlusconi after her manager lied to her and told her they were going to celebrate her achievement of making the Miss Italy beauty pageant finals. She later became one of the key witnesses in the legal proceeding against Berlusconi and reported her experience to Italian magistrates.

Gutierrez was widely covered by the news after she alleged that Harvey Weinstein sexually assaulted her in 2015 while they were reviewing her portfolio. She said she barely spoke English at the time. She filed a police report that night, collaborated with the police, and the next day wore a wire while speaking with Weinstein. In the recording, he repeatedly asks her to come into his room while Gutierrez says things like, "I want to leave," "I don't want to," and "I want to go downstairs." When she asked why he tried to assault her the day before, he said, "Oh, please, I'm sorry, just come on in," continuing, "I'm used to that. Come on. Please." When Gutierrez asks if he's used to groping people against their will, he responds with, "Yes." When asked why he grabbed her breast against her will, he said, "I won't do it again." The recording has since been made public.

Despite the audio confession, the District Attorney Cyrus Vance Jr. decided not to press charges due to lack of evidence. In the following months, Gutierrez received widespread negative press in tabloids including several stories from "anonymous sources" in the New York Post following the incident after the recording was published. She stopped receiving modelling jobs. Gutierrez eventually signed a strict NDA with Weinstein, though she has stated she did not really understand what she was signing at the time, and was trying to protect herself and her family from Weinstein since no one believed her and her family was threatened.

== Activism ==
Gutierrez is a member of the Model Alliance's Leadership Council, which aims to help create a safe and fair work environment for other models, and works with closely with organizations like Eek Media, Safe Horizon, and Humanility.

Gutierrez was the first artist who supported the Me Too movement in Iran. She spoke about her story for Iranian women in a video created by an Iranian legal institute and an American media company.
