= Ossian Dodge =

American performer

Ossian Euclid Dodge (October 22nd 1820 - October 17th 1876) was an American singer, composer, and performer active during the middle of the 19th century.

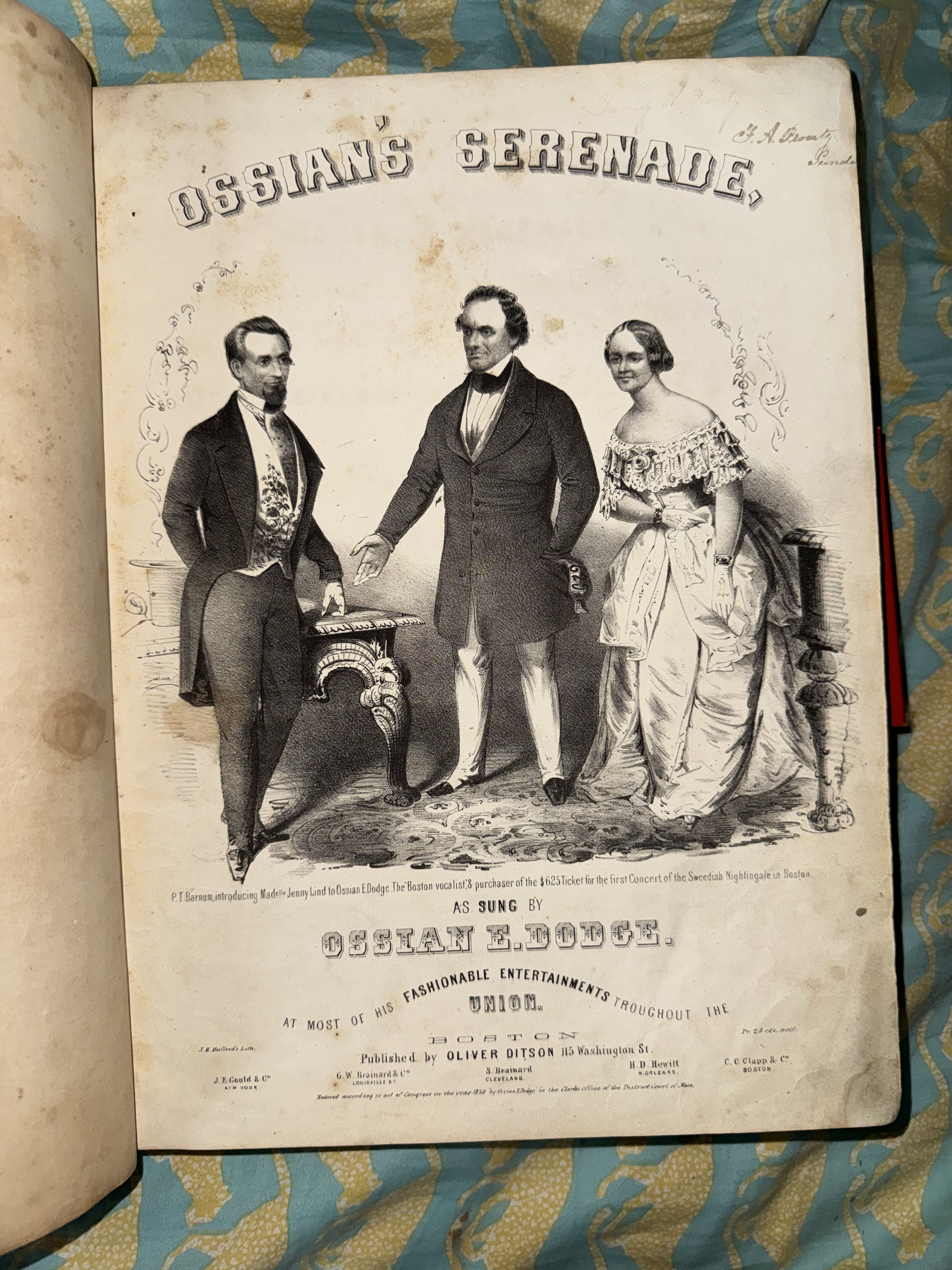
Published by Oliver Ditson in 1850.

== Early life and career ==
Dodge's father was a mathematician who gained a national reputation brokering English claims to Canada. Dodge showed musical talent at an early age, which displeased his parents. In an attempt to curb his musical interests, they apprenticed him to a cabinetmaker at the age of 13. He became known as an ornamental painter, bronzer, gilder, and manufacturer of perspective landscape window curtains. His proficiency in making wax flower bouquets led him to female seminaries, where he taught the art.

After being asked to compose and sing a song for the commencement of one of these schools, Dodge was inspired to pursue a career in music. He moved to New York City and toured with a group known as Dodge's Bards, which helped popularize the song "Bury Me Not on the Lone Prairie". Among his musical works were Ossian's Serenade, Bury Me Not on the Lone Prairie, and The Miseries of Sneezing.

During his performing career, Dodge met entertainers including P. T. Barnum and Jenny Lind. He also associated with political figures including Millard Fillmore and Henry Clay. Dodge pledged to his mother never to drink alcohol and refused to drink to Clay's health at a dinner honoring the statesman. Clay responded by praising Dodge's courage and principles while saying that he did not admire his taste.

== Later life ==
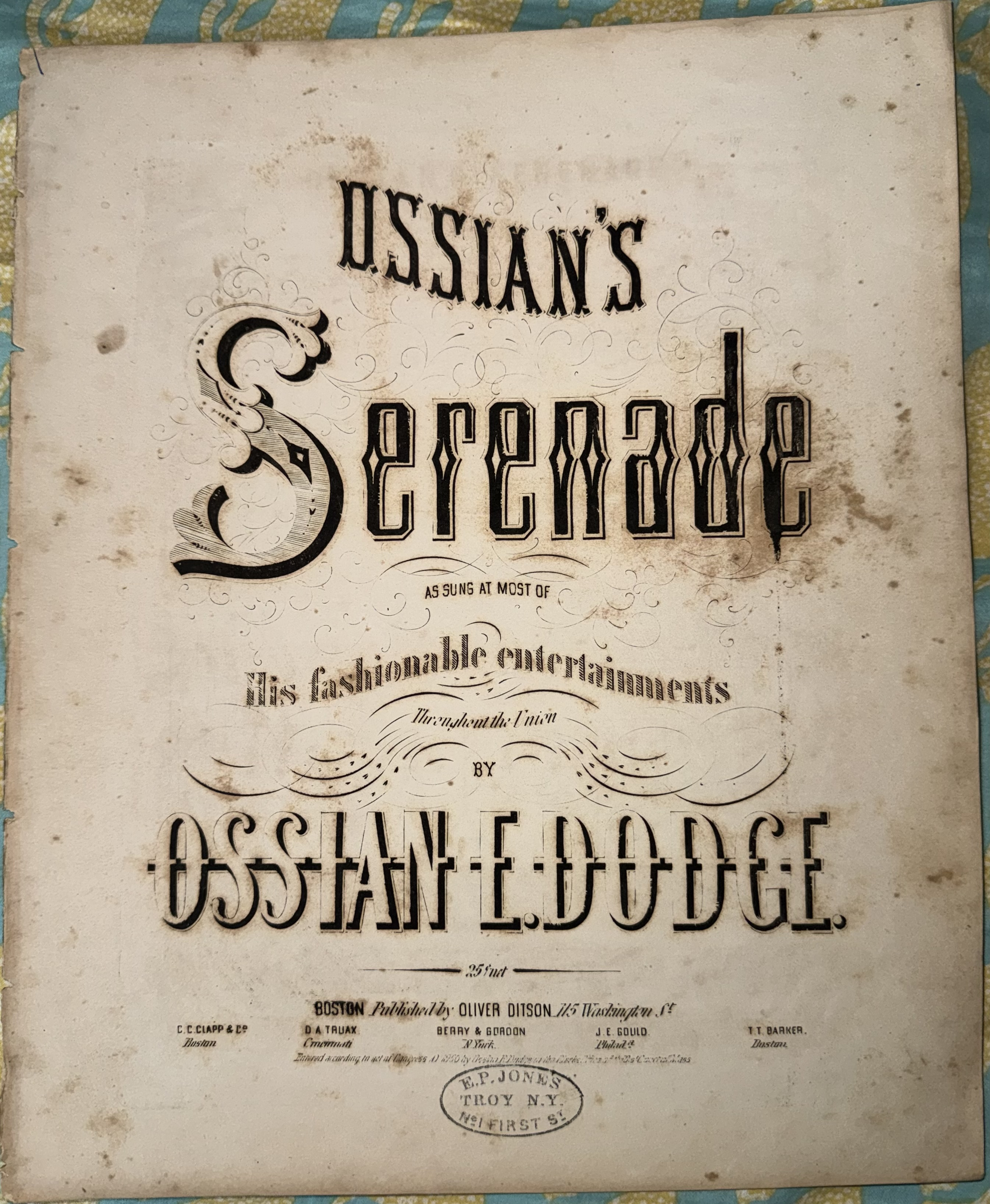
Published 1850 by Oliver ditson

In 1851, he was elected to the 1851 delegation for the International Peace Conference in London. While in Europe, he served as the foreign correspondent for his own journal The Boston Weekly Museum. He retired from singing in 1858 and moved to Cleveland, Ohio, later moving to St. Paul, Minnesota. There he worked in real estate, working as the manager of the Northwestern Real Estate Association in 1870. He also served as the secretary of the St. Paul Chamber of Commerce from 1869 to 1873. Historian Phillip D. Jordan writes about Dodge: "Ossian Euclid Dodge arrived in St. Paul, Minnesota, in the early 1860s when he was of middle age and had reached a time when life held little more for him than financial distress, personal humiliation, and self-imposed exile... No doubt he greeted the city of St. Paul with his customary jaunty brashness, a disguise that lent him a gay and carefree aspect but hid a skein of frustrations and twisted feelings of inferiority... All in all, Dodge looked like a seedy artist struggling to convey an air of affluent respectability; and that, indeed, is what he was. He was also jealous, quick-tempered, unstable, quarrelsome, and inordinately ambitious." Dodge is also reputed to have stolen an original photo of poet Edgar Allan Poe. The picture hung in a photographer's studio in Boston but soon vanished, and a daguerreotype of the image reappeared in Dodge's store in Cleveland.

== Death ==
Dodge died in London in 1876 and was buried there.
