= Joel Geist =

American actor (born 1982)

Joel T. Geist
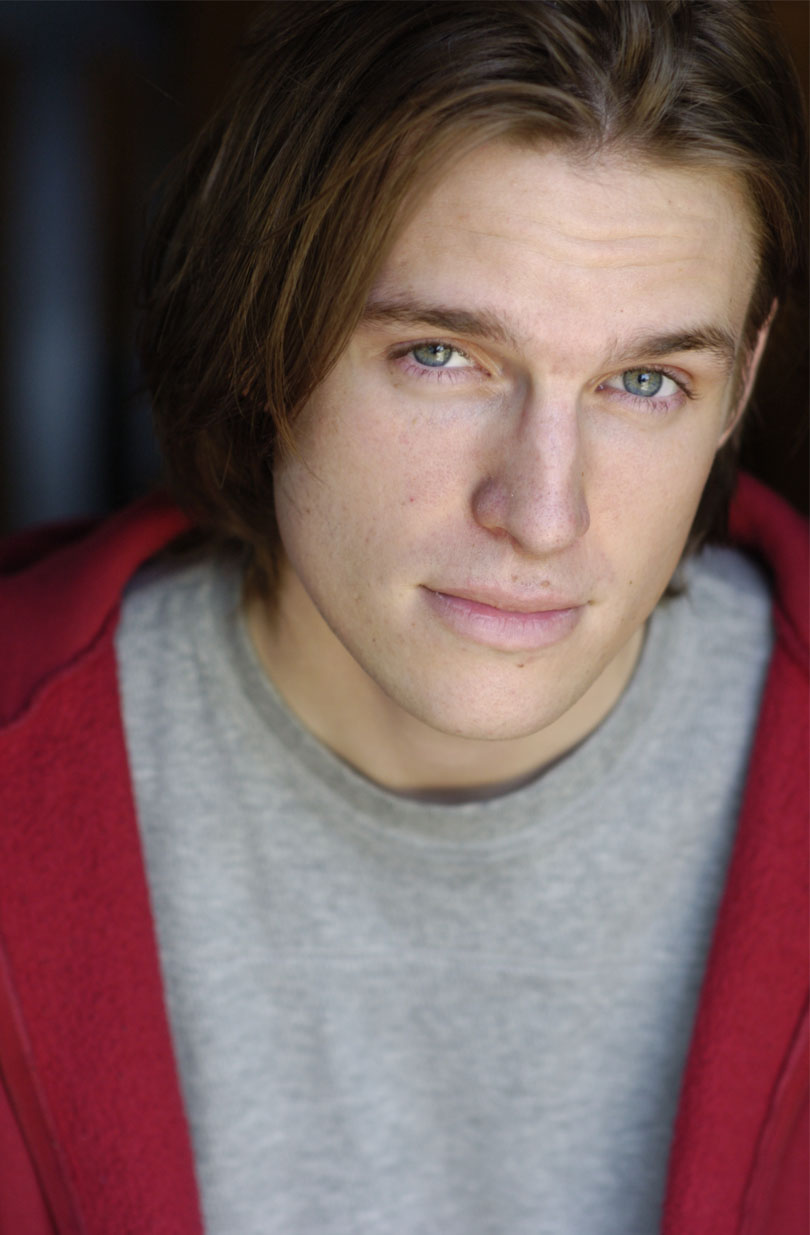
- Born: Joel Thomas Geist; September 21, 1982 (age 43); Denver, Colorado, U.S.
- Occupation: Television actor
- Notable work: Grant in Seance; Doug in Windfall; Alan Beaman in Guilty or Innocent; Donovan in Action Figures; Jeff Balis in The Chris Moore Challenge
- Height: (5 ft 10 in)
- Website: rmtp.biz/content/index.php?option=com_comprofiler&task=userProfile&user=76&Itemid=44

Joel T. Geist (born September 21, 1982, in Denver, Colorado, U.S.) is an American actor.

He is known for his performances on television, ranging from Doug in NBC's short-lived drama Windfall, to his portrayal of real life, former prison inmate Alan Beaman, later exonerated after being found to be innocent, in the Discovery Channel's docu-drama Guilty or Innocent. Geist has also begun a film career most recently punctuated by his starring role beside Highlander's Adrian Paul in the 2006 indie horror film Séance and has co-produced such short films as Action Figures, which he also starred in. Geist is translated to English as spirit or ghost.
