= Robert Geiss =

German writer (born 1964)

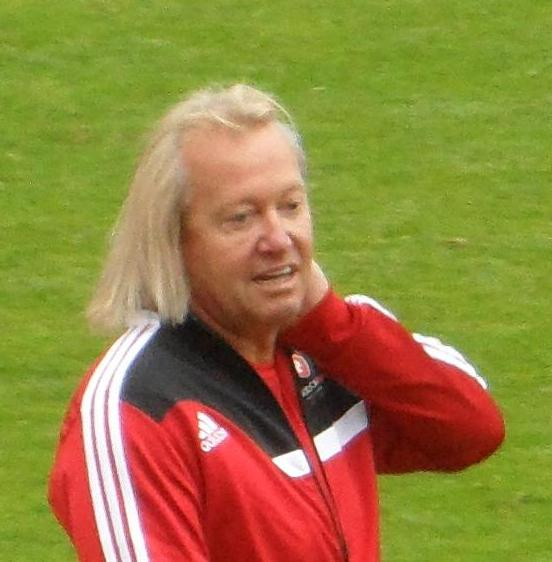
- Geiss playing soccer at a benefit match
- Born: Robert Friedrich Geiss; 29 January 1964 (age 61); Pulheim, Germany
- Occupation: Businessman
- Years active: 1986–present
- Known for: Fitness clothing, designing, business ambition, TV
- Notable work: Uncle Sam, Roberto Geissini, Die Geissens
- Television: Die Geissens
- Spouse(s): Carmen Geiss (married 1994–present)
- Children: Davina Shakira Geiss; Shania Tyra Maria Geiss
- Parent(s): Reinhold Geiss (father); Margret Geiss (mother)
- Relatives: Martina Geiss (sister); Michael Geiss (brother); Vivien Geiss (niece)
- Awards: Deutscher Fernsehpreis (nominated)
- Website: geissens.de

Robert Friedrich Geiss (born 29 January 1964) is a German businessman and TV personality, best known for his show Die Geissens – Eine schrecklich glamouröse Familie, in which he enjoys his luxurious lifestyle together with his family. He is married to Carmen Geiss.

== Biography ==
=== Early years and Uncle Sam ===
As a teenager, Robert Geiss did not want to go to school because he thought that "if you want to make money, you cannot sit at school every day". His father Reinhold Geiss offered him a job as a tradesman in his company, which Robert Geiss declined. He then went on holiday to Spain, where he bought a pair of fitness trousers that he liked. When he returned to Cologne, Geiss decided to design similar clothing for German fitness studios and founded Uncle Sam in 1986. Having sold his inventory very quickly over the winter season, Geiss started buying shirts and pants for 10 DM in Turkey. He then re-sold them for 49 DM in Germany. At the height of his success, Geiss employed 120 people. At some point, Kaufhof AG wanted to buy the firm, but Geiss declined because of legal reasons. In 1995 he finally sold his company for an undisclosed amount to an anonymous buyer and moved to Monaco with his wife Carmen.

=== Return to work and family ===
After ten years of partying and living the jet-set life, Geiss started to engage in buying, refurbishing and reselling luxury real estate. In 2004 his brother bought back Uncle Sam and became CEO of the company. Being friends with bankers in Monaco, Geiss also invested in the stock market. On 30 May 2003 his first daughter Davina Shakira was born, followed by his second daughter, Shania Tyra Maria on 30 July 2004.

=== Present: Die Geissens ===
Since January 2011 he is one of the main characters in the RTL2 TV series Die Geissens – Eine schrecklich glamouröse Familie alongside his family. In the beginning of March 2013 he started designing for his new label Roberto Geissini, which became a popular fashion brand in Germany, Austria, Switzerland and Luxembourg. In May 2015 he opened a small luxury resort on his property in Grimaud near Saint Tropez.

== Publications ==
- Geiss, R.; Geiss, C. & Hock, A. (2013), Von nix kommt nix: Voll auf Erfolgskurs mit den Geissens, Heyne, ISBN 978-3-453-68010-4
