= Mariana Joaquina Pereira Coutinho =

Portuguese lady-in-waiting

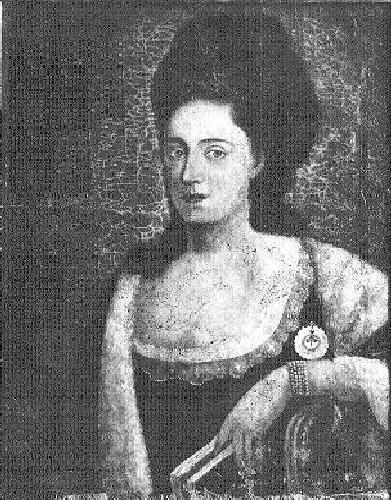
A portrait of Mariana Joaquina Pereira Coutinho

Mariana Joaquina Apolónia da Costa Pereira de Vilhena Coutinho, often called only Mariana de Arriaga (Arcos de Valdevez, 16 August 1748 – Oeiras, 18 September 1820), was a Portuguese courtier and salonist. She was the lady-in-waiting, favorite and confidante of queen Maria I of Portugal. She was also the host of a famous literary salon.

== Life and career ==
Mariana Joaquina Apolónia da Costa Pereira de Vilhena Coutinho was born in Casa do Terreiroin Arcos-de-Valdevez. She was born to the nobleman marshall Rodrigo António da Costa Pereira de Gouvêa, fidalgo da Casa Real, and Maria Inácia Clara Rosa de Vilhena Pereira Coutinho.

In 1769, she married the nobleman Miguel de Arriaga Brum da Silveira, da Ilha do Faial.

Dona Mariana Joaquina de Vilhena Coutinho was appointed dama da casa or lady-in-waiting to the future queen Maria I, who was her own godmother. She became the personal friend of both Maria I as well as Princess Maria Francisca Benedita.

Outside of her duties at court, Dona Mariana was the host of a popular literary salon frequented by both Portuguese and foreign contemporary authors and poets.
