= Christof Geiß =

German mathematician

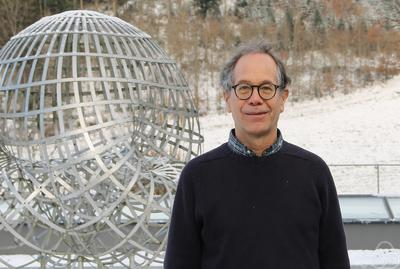
- Geiß in Oberwolfach, 2024
- Education: University of Bayreuth
- Scientific career
- Fields: Mathematics
- Workplaces: UNAM
- Thesis: Tame distributive algebras and related topics (1993)
- Doctoral advisor: Wolfgang Erich Müller, José Antonio de la Peña

Christof Geiß (born 1964), also called Geiss Hahn or Geiß Hahn, is a German mathematician.

Geiß studied mathematics at the University of Bayreuth, where he received in 1990 his Diplom with Diplomarbeit Darstellungsendliche Algebren und multiplikative Basen and in 1993 his doctorate. His doctoral thesis Tame distributive algebras and related topics was written under the supervision of Wolfgang Erich Müller and José Antonio de la Peña. Geiß does research and teaches at the Universidad Nacional Autónoma de México (UNAM), where he studied already in 1991/92 and became in 1993 an Investigador Associado. He is there an Investigador Titular C.

His research deals with cluster algebras in Lie theory and their categorization, pre-projective algebras, and quivers in combination with symmetrizable Cartan matrices.

In 2018 Geiß was an Invited Speaker with talk Quivers with relations for symmetrizable Cartan matrices and algebraic Lie Theory at the International Congress of Mathematics.

== Selected publications ==
- "Tame distributive 2-point algebras". Representations of Algebras: Sixth International Conference, August 19-22, 1992, Ottawa, Ontario, Canada. Vol. 14. American Mathematical Society. 1993. pp. 193–204. ISBN 9780821860199.
- with Bernard Leclerc and Jan Schröer: Geiss, C.; Leclerc, B.; Schroer, J. (2005). "Semicanonical bases and preprojective algebras" (PDF). Annales Scientifiques de l'École Normale Supérieure. 38 (2): 193–253. arXiv:math/0402448. doi:10.1016/j.ansens.2004.12.001. S2CID 15425070.
- with Bernard Leclerc and Jan Schröer: Geiss, Christof; Leclerc, Bernard; Schröer, Jan (September 2007). "Semicanonical bases and preprojective algebras II: A multiplication formula". Compositio Mathematica. 143 (5): 1313–1334. arXiv:math/0509483. doi:10.1112/S0010437X07002977.
- with Bernard Leclerc and Jan Schröer: Geiß, Christof; Leclerc, Bernard; Schröer, Jan (2006). "Rigid modules over preprojective algebras". Inventiones Mathematicae. 165 (3): 589–632. arXiv:math/0503324. Bibcode:2006InMat.165..589G. doi:10.1007/s00222-006-0507-y.
- with Bernard Leclerc and Jan Schröer: Geiss, Christof; Leclerc, Bernard; Schröer, Jan (2007). "Cluster algebra structures and semicanonical bases for unipotent groups". arXiv:math/0703039.
- with Bernard Leclerc and Jan Schröer: Geiß, Christof; Leclerc, Bernard; Schröer, Jan (2007). "Auslander algebras and initial seeds for cluster algebras". Journal of the London Mathematical Society. 75 (3): 718–740. arXiv:math/0506405. doi:10.1112/jlms/jdm017. ISSN 0024-6107. S2CID 2412648.
- with Bernard Leclerc and Jan Schröer: Andrzej Skowroński, ed. (2008). "Preprojective algebras and cluster algebras". Trends in representation theory of algebras and related topics. European Mathematical Society. pp. 253–283. ISBN 978-3-03719-062-3.
- with Bernard Leclerc and Jan Schröer: Geiß, Christof; Leclerc, Bernard; Schröer, Jan (2011). "Kac–Moody groups and cluster algebras". Advances in Mathematics. 228 (1): 329–433. arXiv:1001.3545. doi:10.1016/j.aim.2011.05.011.
- with Bernard Leclerc and Jan Schröer: Geiss, Ch.; Leclerc, B.; Schröer, J. (2013). "Cluster algebras in algebraic Lie theory". Transformation Groups. 18: 149–178. arXiv:1208.5749. doi:10.1007/s00031-013-9215-z.
