= Geist (surname) =

Geist is a surname. Notable people with the surname include:

- Bill Geist (born 1945), American author, columnist and journalist
- Christian Geist (c. 1650–1711), German composer and organist
- Clarence H. Geist (1866–1938), American public utilities magnate
- George Geist (born 1955), American politician
- Joel Geist (born 1982), American actor
- Kaufman Geist, (1895–1948) American track and field athlete
- Michael Geist (born 1968), Canadian academic
- Otto W. Geist (1888–1963), German archaeologist, explorer, and naturalist
- Raymond H. Geist (1885–1955) American diplomat
- Richard Geist (1944–2019), American politician
- Valerius Geist (1938–2021), Canadian biologist
- Willie Geist (born 1975), American television personality
