= Louisette Geiss =

American film producer

- Occupations: Writer, Lyricist, Producer, Sales VP
- Children: 4
- Website: www.louisettegeiss.com

Louisette Geiss is the co-writer/ lyricist, producer (Diane Warren, Howard Kagan) of the musical, The Right Girl. Previous to 2020, she was a producer, screenwriter, voice actor and actress best known for her roles in Angel (1999-2004), Two and a Half Men (2003), The King of Queens (2003), Saints Row (2006), Tomoko's Kitchen (2006), Wishmaster 3 (2001), and Just Cause (1995). In 2017, she revealed she left the Hollywood industry after being told she could not sell her screenplay without first watching Harvey Weinstein masturbate in his office. She also currently works in real estate.
