= James Geiss =

American historian (1950–2000)

James Peter Geiss (14 March 1950 – 19 December 2000) was an American scholar who published several books and articles on Chinese history, specifically on the Ming dynasty (1368-1644 CE).

A graduate of Williams College and Princeton University, he completed his doctoral dissertation, Peking under the Ming (1368-1644) in 1979.

He published two chapters in volume 7 of The Cambridge History of China, focusing on the history of the Ming dynasty. His contributions "The Cheng-Te Reign" and "The Chia-Ching Reign" (1988) were complemented by the more specialized studies "On the significance of the reign title Chia-ching" (1990) and "The Leopard Quarter during the Cheng-te reign" (1987), both in Ming Studies. He published the latter in the Chinese language as "Ming Wuzong yu Baofang" (明武宗与豹房, 1988) in the Palace Museum Journal (故宫博物院院刊), an article taken very seriously by Chinese scholars. He collaborated with Chu Hung-lam to translate original Chinese texts for Louise Levathes's popular book, When China Ruled the Seas (1994) .

With Naiying Yuan and Haitao Tang, he co-authored several textbooks on classical Chinese, notably The Grammar of Classical Chinese: A Basic Introduction, Classical Chinese: A Basic Reader (1994), Readings in Classical Chinese Poetry and Prose (1994), Selections from Classical Chinese Historical Texts (1993), and Selections from Classical Chinese Philosophical Texts (1993). After his death in 2004 the Princeton University Press published new versions of all volumes as Classical Chinese: A Basic Reader, revised and updated by Geiss's coauthors Yuan and Tang.

The James P. Geiss and Margaret Y. Hsu Foundation, a not-for-profit organization dedicated to support research in Ming studies, was established in his honor in 2001 by his wife, Margaret Y. Hsu. Following Hsu's death in 2017, the Board of Directors renamed the foundation in 2018 to honor both.
