= Woody Allen bibliography =

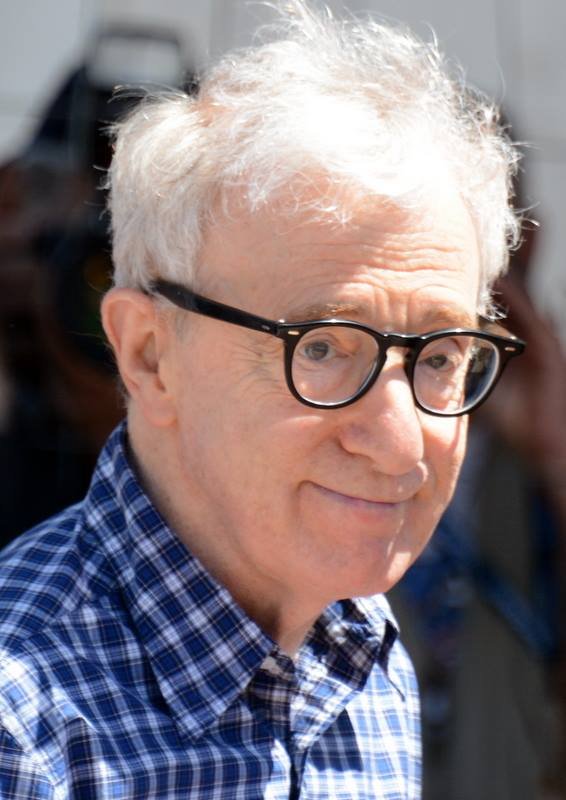
Woody Allen at the 2015 Cannes Film Festival

The following article focused on the Woody Allen bibliography which consists of a list of published (and some unpublished) works by or about him. Woody Allen is an American film director, screenwriter, and actor. He is known for his writing on film, television and theater, both off-Broadway and on Broadway. He is also known for his novels, short stories, pieces in The New Yorker (from 1966 to 2013) and his memoir.

He started his career on television writing for various comedy specials and variety shows for Sid Caesar. He wrote alongside Mel Brooks, Carl Reiner, Larry Gelbart, Neil Simon and Danny Simon. He earned a Primetime Emmy Award for Outstanding Writing for a Variety Series nomination for his work on The Sid Caesar Show (1959). He transitioned to stand-up comedy where he released the comedy albums Woody Allen (1964), Woody Allen Vol. 2 (1965) and The Third Woody Allen Album (1968), the former of which earned him a Grammy Award for Best Comedy Album nomination.

Allen has written numerous humorous short stories and pieces for The New Yorker in the "Shouts and Murmurs" section since 1966 with his latest being published in 2013. He has also published several books of popular short stories, such as Getting Even (1971), Without Feathers (1975) and Side Effects (1980). He released his autobiography, Apropos of Nothing (2020), and his first novel, What's With Baum? (2025).

On stage, he wrote his first Broadway play Don't Drink the Water (1966), Play It Again, Sam (1969), which would be his first ever collaboration with actress Diane Keaton, who received a Tony Award for Best Featured Actress in a Play nomination for her work, and The Floating Light Bulb (1981) which received Tony Award nominations for its actors Jack Weston and Brian Backer. He was part of the off-Broadway three-play compilation Death Defying Acts alongside Elaine May and David Mamet and the Broadway three-play anthology Relatively Speaking with May and Ethan Coen. He adapted his 1994 film into the musical Bullets Over Broadway (2014) earning a Tony Award for Best Book of a Musical nomination.

== Theatre ==
In addition to directing, writing, and acting in films, Allen has written and performed in several Broadway, off-Broadway, and other theatrical productions.

Year	Title	Credit	Venue
1960	From A to Z	Writer (book)	Plymouth Theatre, Broadway
1966	Don't Drink the Water	Writer	Coconut Grove Playhouse, Florida; Morosco Theatre, Broadway
1969	Play It Again, Sam	Writer; Performer (Allan Felix)	Broadhurst Theatre, Broadway
1975	God	Writer	—N/a
1975	Death	Writer	—N/a
1981	The Floating Light Bulb	Writer	Vivian Beaumont Theater, Broadway
1995	Death Defying Acts: Central Park West	Writer	Variety Arts Theatre, Off-Broadway
2003	Old Saybrook (one-act play)	Writer and director	Atlantic Theatre Company, Off-Broadway
2003	Riverside Drive (one-act play)	Writer and director	Atlantic Theatre Company, Off-Broadway
2004	A Second-Hand Memory	Writer and director	Atlantic Theatre Company, Off-Broadway
2008	Gianni Schicchi	Director	Dorothy Chandler Pavilion, Los Angeles
2011	Honeymoon Motel (one-act play)	Writer	Brooks Atkinson Theatre, Broadway
2014	Bullets Over Broadway	Writer (book)	St. James Theatre, Broadway
2015	Gianni Schicchi	Director	Teatro Real, Madrid
2019	Gianni Schicchi	Director	La Scala, Italy
2024	A Brooklyn Fairytale	Writer	Budapest, Hungary
2025	Pure Madness	Writer	Centrál Theater, Budapest, Hungary

== Books ==
=== Novels ===
- What's With Baum? (2025), ISBN 9798895652381

Short Story Collections

- Getting Even (1971), ISBN 0-394-47348-5
- Without Feathers (1975), ISBN 0-394-49743-0
- Side Effects (1980), ISBN 0-394-51104-2
- Mere Anarchy (2007), ISBN 978-1400066414
- Zero Gravity (2022), New York: Arcade Publishing
- You Do to My Heart and Other New York Stories (2026), ISBN 9798895650820

=== Autobiography ===
- Apropos of Nothing (2020), New York: Arcade Publishing

=== Compilation ===
- The Complete Prose of Woody Allen: Without feathers, Getting even and Side effects (1991)
- The Insanity Defense: The Complete Prose. New York: Random House Trade Paperbacks, 2007, ISBN 978-0-8129-7811-7.

=== Interviews ===
- Woody Allen on Woody Allen: In Conversation with Stig Björkman (2005)
- Woody Allen: Interviews (2006)

Chapbook (Note: See chapbook)

- Lunatic's Tale (1986), ISBN 1-55628-001-7 (Short story previously included in Side Effects.)

== The New Yorker pieces ==
Since 1966, Allen has written more than 38 humorous pieces for The New Yorker.

- Allen, Woody (January 22, 1966). "The Gossage-Vardebedian Papers". Shouts & Murmurs. The New Yorker.
- Allen, Woody (May 28, 1966). "A Little Louder, Please". Shouts & Murmurs. The New Yorker.
- Allen, Woody (October 8, 1966). "Yes, But Can The Steam Engine Do This?". Shouts & Murmurs. The New Yorker.
- Allen, Woody (April 29, 1967). "Spring Bulletin". Shouts & Murmurs. The New Yorker.
- Allen, Woody (March 16, 1968). "Notes from the Overfeed". Shouts & Murmurs. The New Yorker.
- Allen, Woody (July 27, 1968). "Death Knocks". Shouts & Murmurs. The New Yorker.
- Allen, Woody (May 10, 1969). "The Metterling Lists". Shouts & Murmurs. The New Yorker.
- Allen, Woody (December 27, 1969). "My Philosophy". Shouts & Murmurs. The New Yorker.
- Allen, Woody (June 20, 1970). "Hassidic Tales, With A Guide To Their Interpretation By The Noted Scholar". Shouts & Murmurs. The New Yorker.
- Allen, Woody (August 15, 1970). "A Look at Organized Crime". Shouts & Murmurs. The New Yorker.
- Allen, Woody (April 17, 1971). "The Schmeed Memoirs". Shouts & Murmurs. The New Yorker.
- Allen, Woody (October 7, 1972). "Examining Psychic Phenomena". Shouts & Murmurs. The New Yorker.
- Allen, Woody (October 28, 1972). "A Guide to Some of the Lesser Ballets". Shouts & Murmurs. The New Yorker.
- Allen, Woody (January 13, 1973). "The Early Essays". Shouts & Murmurs. The New Yorker.
- Allen, Woody (November 5, 1973). "Selections From The Allen Notebooks". Shouts & Murmurs. The New Yorker.
- Allen, Woody (October 28, 1974). "Lovborg's Women Considered". Shouts & Murmurs. The New Yorker.
- Allen, Woody (December 16, 1974). "The Whore of Mensa". Shouts & Murmurs. The New Yorker.
- Allen, Woody (March 3, 1975). "No Kaddish For Weinstein". Shouts & Murmurs. The New Yorker.
- Allen, Woody (March 17, 1975). "Fine Times: An Oral Memoir". Shouts & Murmurs. The New Yorker.
- Allen, Woody (December 29, 1975). "Reminiscences: Places And People". Shouts & Murmurs. The New Yorker.
- Allen, Woody (February 23, 1976). "By Destiny Denied (Notes for an Eight-Hundred-Page Novel-The Big Hook They're All Waiting For)". Shouts & Murmurs. The New Yorker.
- Allen, Woody (October 18, 1976). "The Confessions of a Burglar". Shouts & Murmurs. The New Yorker.
- Allen, Woody (May 2, 1977). "The Kugelmass Episode". Shouts & Murmurs. The New Yorker.
- Allen, Woody (June 13, 1977). "The UFO Menace". Shouts & Murmurs. The New Yorker.
- Allen, Woody (November 21, 1977). "The Condemned". Shouts & Murmurs. The New Yorker.
- Allen, Woody (February 5, 1979). "Fabrizio's: Criticism and Response". Shouts & Murmurs. The New Yorker.
- Allen, Woody (February 25, 1980). "The Diet". Shouts & Murmurs. The New Yorker.
- Allen, Woody (June 9, 1980). "A Giant Step for Mankind". Shouts & Murmurs. The New Yorker.
- Allen, Woody (February 21, 2000). "Attention Geniuses: Cash Only". Shouts & Murmurs. The New Yorker.
- Allen, Woody (November 13, 2000). "On a Bad Day You Can See Forever". Shouts & Murmurs. The New Yorker.
- Allen, Woody (March 4, 2002). "Sing, You Sacher Tortes". Shouts & Murmurs. The New Yorker.
- Allen, Woody (April 14, 2003). "The Rejection". Shouts & Murmurs. The New Yorker.
- Allen, Woody (December 13, 2004). "Surprise Rocks Disney Trial". Shouts & Murmurs. The New Yorker.
- Allen, Woody (November 21, 2005). "Above the Law, Below the Box Springs". Shouts & Murmurs. The New Yorker.
- Allen, Woody (July 6, 2006). "Thus Ate Zarathustra". Shouts & Murmurs. The New Yorker.
- Allen, Woody (October 2, 2006). "Pinchuck's Law". Shouts & Murmurs. The New Yorker.
- Allen, Woody (May 26, 2008). "Over, Around, and Through Your Highness". Shouts & Murmurs. The New Yorker.
- Allen, Woody (November 10, 2008). "Think Hard, It'll Come Back to You". Shouts & Murmurs. The New Yorker.
- Allen, Woody (March 30, 2009). "Tails of Manhattan". Shouts & Murmurs. The New Yorker.
- Allen, Woody (January 10, 2010). "Udder Madness". Shouts & Murmurs. The New Yorker.
- Allen, Woody (May 10, 2010). "Will the Real Avatar Please Stand Up". Shouts & Murmurs. The New Yorker.
- Allen, Woody (January 24, 2011). "Money Can Buy Happiness-As If". Shouts & Murmurs. The New Yorker.
- Allen, Woody (May 28, 2012). "Not a Creature Was Stirring". Shouts & Murmurs. The New Yorker.
- Allen, Woody (August 5, 2013). "Now, where did I leave that oxygen tank?". Shouts & Murmurs. The New Yorker. 89 (23): 30–31.

== Biography ==
- Baxter, John (2000). Woody Allen: A Biography. Carroll & Graf Publishers. ISBN 978-0-7867-0807-9.
- Lax, Eric (2000). Woody Allen: A Biography. Da Capo Press. ISBN 978-0-306-80985-9.
- Meade, Marion (December 2010). The Unruly Life of Woody Allen. E-reads/E-rights. ISBN 978-1-61756-068-2.

== Critical studies ==
- Bailey, Peter (12 September 2010). The Reluctant Film Art of Woody Allen. University Press of Kentucky. ISBN 0-8131-2839-0.
- Blake, Richard Aloysius (1995). Woody Allen: profane and sacred. Scarecrow Press, Incorporated. ISBN 978-0-8108-2993-0.
- Conard, Mark T.; Skoble, Aeon J., eds. (2004). Woody Allen: [You Mean My Whole Fallacy Is Wrong?]. Open Court. ISBN 9780812694536.
- Curry, Renée R. (1996). Perspectives on Woody Allen. G.K. Hall. ISBN 978-0-8161-1615-7.
- Flashner, Graham (1 January 1987). Fun With Woody: The Complete Woody Allen Quiz Book. Henry Holt & Company. ISBN 978-0-8050-0519-6.
- Girgus, Sam B. (18 November 2002). The Films of Woody Allen. Cambridge University Press. ISBN 978-0-521-00929-4.
- Harvey, Adam (6 March 2007). The Soundtracks of Woody Allen: A Complete Guide to the Songs and Music in Every Film, 1969–2005. McFarland. ISBN 978-0-7864-2968-4.
- King, Kimball (2001). Woody Allen: A Casebook. Psychology Press. ISBN 978-0-8153-3124-7.
- Lee, Sander H. (1997). Woody Allen's Angst: Philosophical Commentaries on His Serious Films. McFarland. ISBN 978-0-7864-0207-6.
- Navacelle, Thierry de (1987). Woody Allen on location. Morrow. ISBN 978-0-688-06643-7.
- Reimertz, Stephan (2005). Woody Allen (in German). Rowohlt Taschenbuch Verlag.
- Woody Allen: Conversations with Filmmakers Series, ed. R. E. Kapsis and K. Coblentz, (2006) ISBN 1-57806-793-6
- Ava Cahen, Woody Allen : Profession : cynique, L'Archipel, 2015 (ISBN 978-2-8098-1757-7)
- Brook, Vincent and Grinberg, Marat (Eds.): Woody on Rye. Jewishness in the films and plays of Woody Allen, Brandeis University Press, 2014
- Essay by Victoria Loy on Woody Allen's career, Senseofcinema.com
- Silet, Charles L.P. (27 July 2006). The Films of Woody Allen: Critical Essays. Scarecrow Press. ISBN 978-1-4616-7283-8.
