= Play It Again, Sam (film) =

1972 film by Herbert Ross

- Theatrical release poster
- Directed by: Herbert Ross
- Screenplay by: Woody Allen
- Based on: Play It Again, Sam by Woody Allen
- Produced by: Arthur P. Jacobs
- Starring: Woody Allen; Diane Keaton; Tony Roberts; Jerry Lacy; Susan Anspach
- Cinematography: Owen Roizman
- Edited by: Marion Rothman
- Music by: Billy Goldenberg
- Production company: APJAC Productions
- Distributed by: Paramount Pictures
- Release date: May 4, 1972
- Running time: 87 minutes
- Country: United States
- Language: English

Play It Again, Sam is a 1972 American comedy film written by and starring Woody Allen, based on his 1969 Broadway play of the same title. The film was directed by Herbert Ross, instead of Allen, who usually directs his own written work.

The film is about a recently divorced film critic, Allan Felix, who is urged to begin dating again by his best friend and his best friend's wife. Allan identifies with the 1942 film Casablanca and the character Rick Blaine as played by Humphrey Bogart. The film contains clips from the movie and ghost-like appearances of Bogart (Jerry Lacy) giving advice on how to treat women.

== Plot ==
Set in San Francisco, Play It Again, Sam begins with the closing scenes of Casablanca, with Humphrey Bogart and Ingrid Bergman. Allan Felix watches the film in a cinema. He leaves the cinema depressed that he will never be like Bogart.

Apart from apparitions of Bogart, Allan also has frequent flashbacks of conversations with his ex-wife, Nancy, who constantly ridiculed his sexual inadequacy. His best friend, Dick Christie, and Dick's wife, Linda, try to convince him to go out with women again, setting him up on a series of blind dates, all of which end badly. Throughout the film, he is seen receiving dating advice from the ghost of Bogart, who is visible and audible only to Allan. Nancy also makes fantasy appearances, as he imagines conversations with her about the breakdown of their marriage. On one occasion, the fantasy seems to run out of control, with both Bogart and Nancy appearing.

When it comes to women, he attempts to become sexy and sophisticated, like his idol, Bogart, only to end up ruining his chances by being too clumsy. He eventually develops feelings for Linda, around whom he is more relaxed and does not have the need to put on the mask. At the point where he finally makes his move on Linda (aided by comments from Bogart), a vision of his ex-wife appears and shoots Bogart, leaving him without advice. He then makes an awkward move. Linda runs off, but then returns, realizing that Allan loves her.

However, their relationship is doomed, just as it was for Rick and Ilsa in Casablanca. Dick returns early from Cleveland and confides to Allan that he thinks Linda is having an affair, not realizing her affair is with Allan. Dick expresses to Allan his love for Linda.

The final scene is an allusion to Casablanca's famous ending. Dick is catching a flight to Cleveland, Linda is after him, and Allan is chasing Linda. The fog, the aircraft engine start-ups, the trenchcoats, and the dialogue are all reminiscent of the film, as Allan nobly explains to Linda why she has to go with her husband, rather than stay behind with him. Bogart says that he has learned how to be himself and no longer needs him for advice. The music from the scene in Casablanca resumes the theme, "As Time Goes By", and the film ends.

== Cast ==
- Woody Allen as Allan Felix, a neurotic, recently divorced writer
- Diane Keaton as Linda Christie, Dick's wife, with whom Allan falls in love
- Tony Roberts as Dick Christie, Allan's best friend and Linda's husband, a workaholic businessman in real estate
- Jerry Lacy as Humphrey Bogart
- Susan Anspach as Nancy, Allan's ex-wife
- Jennifer Salt as Sharon
- Joy Bang as Julie
- Viva as Jennifer

Humphrey Bogart and Ingrid Bergman appear in archival appearances from Casablanca as Richard "Rick" Blaine and Ilsa Lund, respectively.

== Reception ==
On the review aggregator website Rotten Tomatoes, 97% of 35 critics' reviews are positive, with an average rating of 7.4/10. Metacritic, which uses a weighted average, assigned the film a score of 77 out of 100, based on 8 critics, indicating "generally favorable" reviews.

Roger Ebert of the Chicago Sun-Times praised the film, giving it three out of four stars and saying, "as comedies go, this is a very funny one." He elaborated, concluding, "Maybe the movie has too much coherence, and the plot is too predictable; that's a weakness of films based on well-made Broadway plays. Still, that's hardly a serious complaint about something as funny as Play It Again, Sam." Gene Siskel of the Chicago Tribune also gave it three out of four stars, writing, "For those who prefer their films with a beginning, middle and an end, and, consequently, were unsettled by the hellzapoppin' plots of 'Bananas' or 'Take the Money and Run,' 'Play It Again Sam' will provide warmth, sanity, and an unconventional story with laughs." Vincent Canby of The New York Times called it "a very funny film" although he also said "the shape of the ordinary Broadway comedy, with three acts and a beginning, middle and end, inhibit the Woody Allen that I, at least, appreciate most." Charles Champlin of the Los Angeles Times wrote that the film was "in the tradition of the best bright comedies of the past, full of funny lines and situations but supported and enriched by an accurately perceived and recognizable character whose own consistency provides the logic for mad events and a lasting power for the laughter." David McGillivray of The Monthly Film Bulletin called it "a treat for Woody Allen fans and a quite amusing, unobjectionable comedy for everyone else", though he thought it "hardly improves" upon the original play.

== Influence ==
Quentin Tarantino said on his commentary track for True Romance (1993) that the character of Elvis Presley as portrayed by Val Kilmer, who appears to Christian Slater's character and gives advice and assurance, was based on the Bogart character in this film.

The 2005 song "Beautiful and Light" by Tunng contains samples from the film.

The Second City comedy troupe's television show SCTV parodied the film. Play It Again, Bob stars Allen (Rick Moranis) and Bob Hope (Dave Thomas).

The Family Guy episode "Play It Again, Brian" is a homage to the film, with Brian Griffin having unrequited feelings for Lois Griffin, his best friend Peter's wife.

== See also ==
- List of American films of 1972
