= Take the Money and Run (film) =

1969 film by Woody Allen

- Theatrical release poster
- Directed by: Woody Allen
- Written by: Woody Allen; Mickey Rose
- Produced by: Charles H. Joffe
- Starring: Woody Allen; Janet Margolin
- Narrated by: Jackson Beck
- Cinematography: Lester Shorr
- Edited by: Paul Jordan; Ron Kalish
- Music by: Marvin Hamlisch
- Production companies: ABC Pictures; Palomar Pictures International
- Distributed by: Cinerama Releasing Corporation
- Release date: August 18, 1969
- Running time: 85 minutes
- Language: English
- Budget: $1,530,000
- Box office: $3,040,000 (rentals)

Take the Money and Run is a 1969 American mockumentary crime comedy film directed by Woody Allen. Allen co-wrote the screenplay with Mickey Rose and stars alongside Janet Margolin. The film chronicles the life of Virgil Starkwell, an inept bank robber.

Filmed in San Francisco and San Quentin State Prison, Take the Money and Run received Golden Laurel nominations for Male Comedy Performance (Woody Allen) and Male New Face (Woody Allen), and a Writers Guild of America Award nomination for Best Comedy Written Directly for the Screen (Woody Allen, Mickey Rose).

== Plot ==
As a child, Virgil Starkwell is a frequent target of bullies, who take his glasses and stamp on them on the floor. In school, he scores well on an IQ test. When he steals a fountain pen, his teacher instructs the class to close their eyes so the thief can return it. While all eyes are closed, Virgil returns the pen, but takes the opportunity to "feel" all the girls.

As an adult, Virgil is clumsy and socially awkward. Stealing a gun to rob an armored truck, during a shootout with the guards, he finds that his gun is a cigarette lighter. Arrested, Virgil attempts an escape from prison using a bar of soap carved to resemble a gun, but his "gun" dissolves in the rain. He is sentenced to an additional two years but is released on bail after he volunteers to receive an experimental vaccine, following which he briefly becomes an ultra-Orthodox Jew.

Out on parole, Virgil's attempt to rob a local pet shop fails when a gorilla chases him away. In the park, he meets Louise; after 15 minutes he knows he is in love and wants to marry her, after 30 minutes he gives up the idea of snatching her purse. Virgil steals coins from a gumball machine, paying for dinner with nickels. (Note: This is a parody of Cool Hand Luke.)

Virgil's attempt to rob a bank is stymied by an argument about his handwriting on a demand note. The cashier asks what "I am pointing a 'gub' at you" means, and Virgil insists it says "gun"; the cashier's supervisor asks what "Abt natural" means. Virgil insists it's "act natural". While over a dozen bank employees attempt to decipher the note, the police arrive. Virgil is sentenced to ten years in maximum security. He asks Louise to bake him a cake with a gun in it and a dozen chocolate cookies with a bullet in each (she does not). Virgil joins a mass breakout plan, but the guards become suspicious when all their uniforms are missing from the laundry. The breakout is called off, and Virgil is the only inmate not informed, but manages to escape anyway.

Virgil marries Louise, but finds it difficult to support his family. Lying about his background, he is hired in the mailroom. He is eventually blackmailed by a fellow employee, Miss Blair, who forces him into a romantic relationship. (Note: This is a parody of I Am a Fugitive from a Chain Gang.) Deciding to kill his blackmailer, he disguises sticks of dynamite as candles. He attempts to run her over with his car, but she evades it. He attempts to stab her with a knife, but grabs a turkey leg by mistake and stabs her with it. She finally lights the "candles" that explode.

Another bank robbery is botched when a second gang also holds up the bank, and the customers vote that they prefer the other gang to rob the bank. Virgil is sentenced to ten years on a chain gang, where he is tortured in a penalty box with an insurance salesman. Virgil eventually asks another prisoner whether his aim is good enough to smash his chain with a sledgehammer; his aim misses and Virgil's foot is hit instead. (Note: This is a parody of I Am a Fugitive from a Chain Gang.) Virgil and five other prisoners—including two black prisoners—all chained together later make a break for it while on work detail. (Note: This is a parody of The Defiant Ones.) Attempting to scatter, they do not get very far. They take an old woman hostage, telling her to pretend to the police that they are her cousins and attempting to hide their chains by standing close together and moving in unison. They knock out the officer and escape, hiding out with Louise.

Virgil is eventually recaptured attempting to rob a former friend who is now a policeman. Virgil is tried on fifty-two counts of robbery and sentenced to eight hundred years, but remains optimistic reasoning, "with good behavior, he can cut the sentence in half." Virgil is later carving a bar of soap and asking an interviewer making a documentary about his life if it is raining outside.

== Cast ==
- Woody Allen as Virgil Starkwell
- Janet Margolin as Louise
- Marcel Hillaire as Fritz the Director
- Jacquelyn Hyde as Miss Blair
- Lonny Chapman as Jake the Convict
- Jan Merlin as Al the Bank Robber
- James Anderson as Chain Gang Warden
- Howard Storm as Fred
- Mark Gordon as Vince
- Micil Murphy as Frank
- Minnow Moskowitz as Joe Agneta
- Nate Jacobson as The Judge
- Grace Bauer as Farm House Lady
- Ethel Sokolow as Mother Starkwell
- Dan Frazer as Julius Epstein the Psychiatrist
- Henry Leff as Father Starkwell
- Mike O'Dowd as Michael Sullivan
- Louise Lasser as Kay Lewis

== Production ==
This was the second film directed by Woody Allen, after What's Up, Tiger Lily?. However, Allen was dismissive of What's Up, Tiger Lily? in a 2020 interview, and said he regarded Take the Money and Run as "the first time I really wrote the picture, and then directed it, and got the picture that I was capable of doing to the best of my ability at that point in my life." He had originally wanted Jerry Lewis to direct, but when that did not work out, Allen decided to direct it himself. Allen's decision to become his own director was partially spurred on by the chaotic and uncontrolled filming of Casino Royale (1967), in which he had appeared two years previously. The manic, almost slapstick style is similar to that of Allen's next several films, including Bananas (1971) and Sleeper (1973).

Allen discussed the concept of filming a documentary in an interview with Richard Schickel:

Take the Money and Run was an early pseudo-documentary. The idea of doing a documentary, which I later finally perfected when I did Zelig was with me from the first day I started movies. I thought that was an ideal vehicle for doing comedy, because the documentary format was very serious, so you were immediately operating in an area where any little thing you did upset the seriousness and was thereby funny. And you could tell your story laugh by laugh by laugh... The object of the movie was for every inch of it to be a laugh.

The film was shot on location in San Francisco, including scenes filmed at a Bank of America branch on the 4th of July 1968, and in Ernie's restaurant, whose striking red interior was immortalized in Alfred Hitchcock's Vertigo (1958). Other scenes were filmed at San Quentin State Prison, where 100 prisoners were paid a small fee to work on the film. The regular cast and crew were stamped each day with a special ink that glowed under ultra-violet light so the guards could tell who was allowed to leave the prison grounds at the end of the day. (One of the actors in the San Quentin scenes was Micil Murphy, who knew the prison well: he had served five and a half years there, for armed robbery, before being paroled in 1966.)

Allen initially filmed a downbeat ending in which he was shot to death, courtesy of special effects from A.D. Flowers. Reputedly the lighter ending is due to the influence of Allen's editor, Ralph Rosenblum, in his first collaboration with Allen.

== Reception ==
=== Box office ===
The film opened on August 18, 1969 at the 68th St. Playhouse in New York City and grossed a house record $33,478 in its first week and even more in its second week with $35,999.

By 1973, the film had earned rentals of $2,590,000 in the United States and Canada and $450,000 in other countries. After all costs were deducted, it reported a loss of $610,000.

=== Critical response ===
The film received mostly positive reviews. Vincent Canby of The New York Times described it as "a movie that is, in effect, a feature-length, two-reel comedy—something very special and eccentric and funny", even though toward the end "a certain monotony sets in" with Allen's comedy rhythm. In his later review of Annie Hall, Canby revised his opinion of Take the Money and Run, stating "Annie Hall is not terribly far removed from Take the Money and Run, his first work as a triple-threat man, which is not to put down the new movie but to upgrade the earlier one".

Roger Ebert of the Chicago Sun-Times found the film to have many funny moments, but "in the last analysis it isn't a very funny movie", with the fault lying with its visual humor and editing. In October 2013, the film was voted by the Guardian readers as the sixth best film directed by Allen.

Stanley Kauffmann of The New Republic wrote:

"Once again he (Allen) is the bespectacled shnook, this time the shnook as criminal. We never believe for a moment that Allen is a criminal – as we can believe, at least partially, that Keaton is a Confederate railroad engineer-so the fun is all conscious comment. This means that the comment has to keep coming; there is little chance for dramatic understructure in the comedy. And this, plus the fact that Allen doesn't even seem to sense the need for cumulation and growth, makes the picture a series of items, good or less good. But a lot of them are funny."

On the review aggregator web site Rotten Tomatoes, the film holds a 91% positive rating with an average rating of 6.9/10, based on 23 reviews.

=== Awards and honors ===
- Golden Laurel Nomination for Male Comedy Performance (Woody Allen)
- Golden Laurel Nomination for Male New Face (Woody Allen)
- Writers Guild of America Award Nomination for Best Comedy Written Directly for the Screen (Woody Allen, Mickey Rose).

The film is recognized by American Film Institute in these lists:

- 2000: AFI's 100 Years...100 Laughs – #66
- 2005: AFI's 100 Years...100 Movie Quotes:
  - Bank Teller #1: "Does this look like "gub" or "gun"?"

Bank Teller #2: "Gun. See? But what's "abt" mean?"
Virgil Starkwell: "It's "act". A-C-T. Act natural. Please put fifty thousand dollars into this bag and act natural."
Bank Teller #1: "Oh, I see. This is a holdup?"
– Nominated

== Home media ==
Take the Money and Run was released on VHS in 1980, with reissues in 1987 and 1992. It came to DVD through MGM Home Video on July 6, 2004 as a Region 1 fullscreen DVD. Kino Video released the film on Blu-ray in October 2017, although the only bonus features are trailers for other films.

== See also ==
- List of American films of 1969
