= Don't Drink the Water (play) =

1966 play by Woody Allen

Don't Drink the Water is a play written by Woody Allen that premiered on Broadway in 1966. The farce takes place inside an American Embassy behind the Iron Curtain. Although Allen contributed material for the 1960 Broadway musical revue From A to Z, this was his first professionally produced play. The play was described as being "near the hit line", "one big overfed American folk joke" and "a very funny situation comedy" by critic Otis L. Guernsey.

== Production ==
Don't Drink the Water premiered on Broadway at the Morosco Theatre on November 17, 1966, and closed on April 20, 1968, after 598 performances at three different Broadway theaters. The cast included Lou Jacobi, Kay Medford and Anita Gillette as the Hollander family. Tony Roberts (Axel Magee) and Donna Mills (Sultan's First Wife) were also in the cast. Richard Libertini also appeared, as Father Drobney, and reprised the role in the 1969 film. The production was directed by Stanley Prager and produced by David Merrick with Charles H. Joffe and Jack Rollins.

According to the book Conversations with Woody Allen by Eric Lax, Allen says that Vivian Vance was originally cast as the wife character, but agreed she was wrong for the part, so she was replaced by Kay Medford, who Allen believes brought the character to life.

== Plot ==
In an unnamed European country behind the Iron Curtain, the American Ambassador must leave the embassy for business. In his absence he places his incompetent son Axel Magee in charge. Almost immediately the embassy is thrust into a crisis as the Hollanders, an American family of tourists, come rushing in on the run from the Communist police. Walter Hollander, the father, had accidentally sneaked into a high security area and taken pictures, causing the communists to believe that the family are spies. Axel digs the hole deeper and the embassy is surrounded, leaving the Hollanders trapped.

The parents, Walter and Marion, act buffoonishly and make business at the embassy difficult, especially after Walter insults a high-class Sultan. The family's adult daughter Susan bonds with Axel, causing him to develop feelings for her even though she is engaged. After the incident with the Sultan, Axel's father demotes him and elevates his favor-seeking assistant Kilroy in charge instead. Kilroy almost immediately fixes the problem and arranges an exchange for a communist spy in jail in America. The communist police head Krojack still believes that the Hollanders are spies and confronts Walter. Walter, assuming that he is free, jokingly admits that he is. Kilroy then announces that the exchange has been called off, as the spy has committed suicide. Krojack plans to increase the hostilities against the embassy. Susan, having recently announced her engagement has been called off, kisses Axel to Walter's horror.

Though there are now riots outside the embassy, Walter is much more concerned with Axel's and Susan's relationship. Axel and Susan come up with a plan to escape by using a party in the Sultan's honor as a cover while Father Drobney, a priest who has been hiding in a small room in the embassy for six years, works out the details. Walter is given a gun for the escape and accidentally shoots and wounds Kilroy. During the party Walter and Marion go through several problems, mainly due to a number of revelations or near-revelations of their own secret identities. Upon finally making it out, Walter accidentally shoots someone again—it proves to be Axel's own father. The escape appears to have failed till Axel discovers that the Sultan and his wife are still in the house, severely hungover from the night before. Disguising Walter and Marion as the couple, they plan to continue with the original escape. As for Susan, Axel plans to give her diplomatic immunity as the wife of a diplomat: himself. Walter and Marion escape as Father Drobney marries Axel and Susan.

== Film adaptation ==
In 1969, the play was adapted into the film Don't Drink the Water. It starred Jackie Gleason. In 1994, Allen directed and played the lead in a TV version also titled Don't Drink the Water featuring Michael J. Fox.
