= Getting Even (Allen book) =

1971 collection of stories by Woody Allen

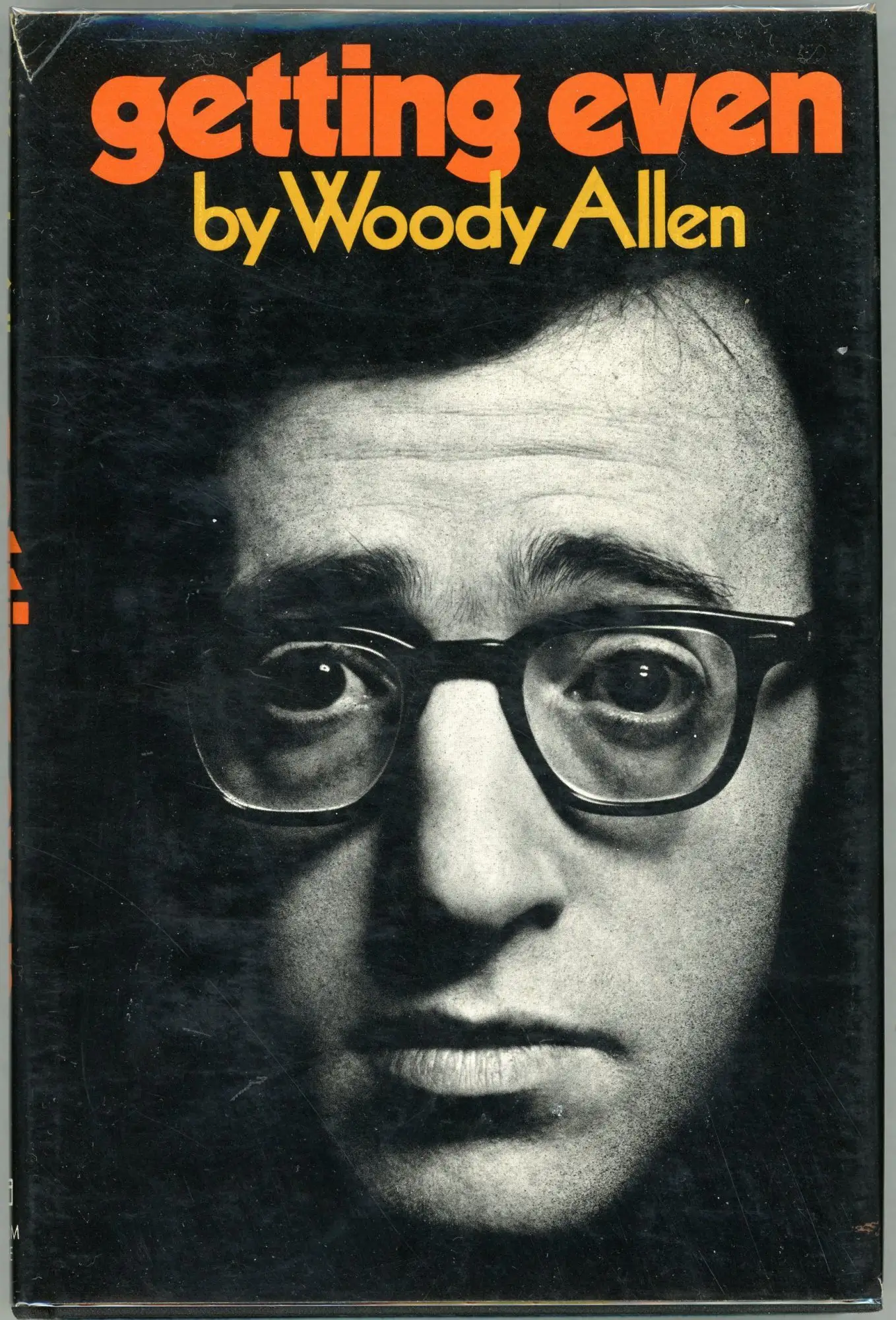
- Hardcover edition
- Author: Woody Allen
- Language: English
- Genre: Fiction
- Publisher: Random House
- Publication date: 1971
- Publication place: United States
- Media type: Print
- Pages: 151 pp.
- ISBN: 978-0394473482
- OCLC: 244836

Getting Even (1971) is Woody Allen's first collection of humorous stories, essays, and one short play. Most pieces were first published in The New Yorker between 1966 and 1971.

== Contents ==
1. The Metterling Lists
2. A Look at Organized Crime
3. The Schmeed Memoirs
4. My Philosophy
5. Yes, But Can the Steam Engine Do This?
6. Death Knocks
7. Spring Bulletin
8. Hassidic Tales
9. The Gossage-Vardebedian Papers
10. Notes from the Overfed
11. A Twenties Memory
12. Count Dracula
13. A Little Louder, Please
14. Conversations with Helmholtz
15. Viva Vargas!
16. The Discovery and Use of the Fake Ink Blot
17. Mr. Big

== Some of the tales in detail ==
- "Mr. Big" is a parody of the style and structure of hardboiled detective stories. The protagonist, Kaiser Lupowitz, is a parody of the characters which were typically played by Humphrey Bogart on film: Dashiell Hammett's Sam Spade in The Maltese Falcon, Mickey Spillane's Mike Hammer and Raymond Chandler's Philip Marlowe. Kaiser smokes Lucky Strike like Sam Spade, and is also used by Allen in another hard boiled parody, The Whore of Mensa (1974), collected in Without Feathers (1975).
- The philosophical arguments of "My Philosophy" will be later used in the films Bananas and Love and Death.
- The play "Death Knocks" is a direct parody of Ingmar Bergman's 1957 The Seventh Seal.
- "The Schmeed Memoirs" heavily parodies Felix Kersten.
