= What's With Baum? =

2025 novel by Woody Allen

- Author: Woody Allen
- Publisher: Post Hill Press
- Publication date: September 23, 2025
- ISBN: 9781800756298

What's With Baum? is a novel by Woody Allen. It was published in September 2025 by Post Hill Press. It is Allen's first published novel.

== Plot ==
The book follows the misadventures and neurotic deterioration of middle-aged Jewish writer Asher Baum.
