= Relatively Speaking (play anthology) =

- Softcover edition
- Original language: English
- Written by: Ethan Coen, Elaine May and Woody Allen
- Genre: Comedy

Premiere
- Date: October 20, 2011
- Place: Brooks Atkinson Theatre, New York City

Relatively Speaking is an anthology produced on Broadway in 2011, consisting of three plays: Talking Cure by Ethan Coen, George Is Dead by Elaine May and Honeymoon Motel by Woody Allen.

== Production ==
It opened at the Brooks Atkinson Theatre on October 20, 2011 and closed on January 29, 2012, after 118 regular performances. All three were directed by John Turturro. The plays were produced by Julian Schlossberg and Letty Aronson (Allen's sister).

=== Cast ===
The three plays were cast as follows:

- Talking Cure: The play involves a therapist treating a mentally ill family member.
  - Jason Kravits (Doctor)
  - Danny Hoch (Jerry)
  - Max Gordon Moore (Attendant)
  - Allen Lewis Rickman (Father)
  - Katherine Borowitz (Mother)
- George Is Dead: The play considers "the hilarity of death."
  - Lisa Emery (Carla)
  - Marlo Thomas (Doreen)
  - Grant Shaud (Michael)
  - Patricia O'Connell (Nanny)
  - Rickman (Funeral Director)
  - Moore (Assistant Funeral Director)
- Honeymoon Motel: The plot involves an unusual wedding and takes place in a motel on a highway.
  - Steve Guttenberg (Jerry Spector)
  - Ari Graynor (Nina Roth)
  - Shaud (Eddie)
  - Caroline Aaron (Judy Spector)
  - Julie Kavner (Fay Roth)
  - Mark Linn-Baker (Sam Roth)
  - Richard Libertini (Rabbi Baumel)
  - Jason Kravits (Dr. Brill)
  - Hoch (Sal Buonacotti)
  - Bill Army (Paul Jessup)

== Overview ==
Woody Allen said of the plays: "It's a broad comedy, for laughs, no redeeming social value." The plays are described as involving various family members.

Santo Loquasto "designed sets for each play that suggest each author's film persona." The design for the Allen play is a "colorful, comical design for the motel, with its circular bed and pink Jacuzzi."
