= Side Effects (Allen book) =

Book of essays by Woody Allen

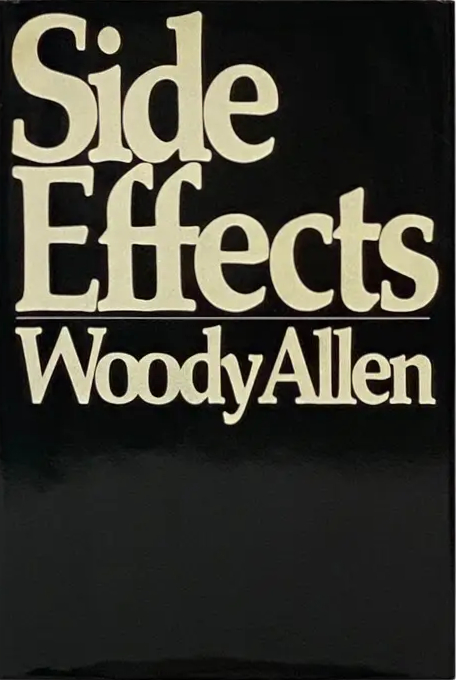
- First edition
- Author: Woody Allen
- Language: English
- Genre: Fiction
- Publisher: Random House
- Publication date: September 12, 1980
- Publication place: United States
- Media type: Print
- Pages: 149 pp.
- ISBN: 0394511042 hardcover edition
- OCLC: 6329291

Side Effects is an anthology of 17 comical short essays written by Woody Allen between 1975 and 1980, all but one of which were previously published in, variously, The New Republic, The New York Times, The New Yorker, and The Kenyon Review. It includes Allen's 1978 O. Henry Award-winning story "The Kugelmass Episode".

== Contents ==
1. Remembering Needleman
2. The Condemned
3. By Destiny Denied
4. The UFO Menace
5. My Apology
6. The Kugelmass Episode
7. My Speech to the Graduates
8. The Diet
9. The Lunatic's Tale
10. Reminiscences: Places and People
11. Nefarious Times We Live In
12. A Giant Step for Mankind
13. The Shallowest Man
14. The Query
15. Fabrizio's: Criticism and Response
16. Retribution
17. Confessions of a Burglar

== Some of the tales in detail ==
- "Remembering Needleman" is a one-liner- and non-sequitur-filled obituary for Professor Sandor Needleman.
- "By Destiny Denied" presents the reader with notes for a fictional "eight-hundred-page novel—the big book they're all waiting for."
- "My Apology" is Allen's tale of a recurring fantasy/dream of his where he imagines himself in the sandals of Socrates during the philosopher's final days in prison.
- "The Kugelmass Episode" is about a CCNY professor, Sidney Kugelmass, who, thanks to the powers of an obscure magician, is projected into Madame Bovary to carry on an affair beyond the scrutiny of his overbearing wife.
- "My Speech to the Graduates" is a parody of platitude-laden commencement speeches.
- "Nefarious Times We Live In" concerns the events that lead its protagonist, Willard Pogrebin, to fire a Luger at President Gerald Ford. They involve at least five kinds of drugs and three cults.

== Running jokes ==
Throughout the book, frequent references are made to composer Igor Stravinsky. In addition, numerous gags are made with an implication that people bear an innate knowledge of Dutch. Characters' love interests are compared to a grotesque, golem-like Aunt Rifka in two separate stories.
