= Play It Again, Sam (play) =

Play by Woody Allen

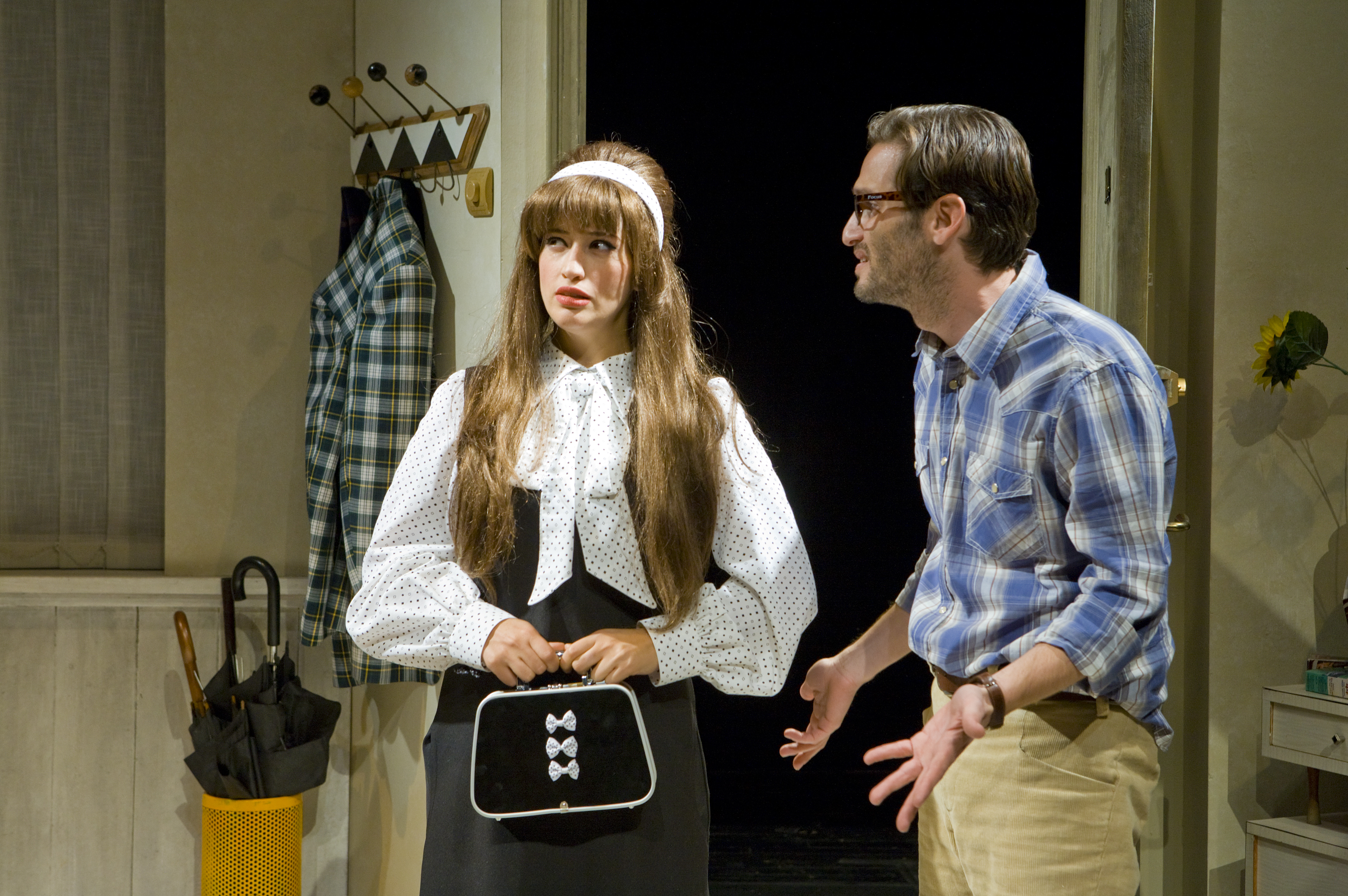
- Meirav Shirom and Guri Alfi in Play It Again, Sam, 2010
- Original language: English
- Written by: Woody Allen
- Genre: Romantic comedy
- Setting: New York City, present

Premiere
- Date: February 12, 1969
- Place: Broadhurst Theatre; New York City

Play It Again, Sam is a 1969 Broadway play written by and originally starring Woody Allen. A substantial hit, it ran for more than a year and helped build Allen's reputation as a performer who could portray a comedic romantic lead as well as the neurotic persona for which he was best known at the time. The play became the basis for a 1972 film of the same name, starring Allen and directed by Herbert Ross.

== Plot ==
The play is about a recently divorced film magazine writer, Allan Felix, who is trying to restart his romantic life. Eventually he falls in love (and has a brief affair) with Linda, the wife of his best friend, Dick. During the course of the play, he repeatedly seeks advice from the ghost of his idol, Humphrey Bogart, but eventually decides that he needs to be himself rather than imitating Bogart. Telling Linda that the right thing for her to do is to return to her husband, Felix quotes the famous lines that Bogart delivers to Ingrid Bergman in the last scene of Casablanca.

== Original Cast ==
- Woody Allen as Allan Felix
- Sheila Sullivan as Nancy
- Jerry Lacy as Bogart
- Tony Roberts as Dick Christie
- Diane Keaton as Linda Christie
- Barbara Brownell as Dream Sharon/Barbara
- Diana Walker as Sharon Lake
- Jean Fowler as Gina
- Cynthia Dalbey as Vanessa
- Lee Ann Fahey as Go Go Girl
- Barbara Press as Intellectual Girl

== Production ==
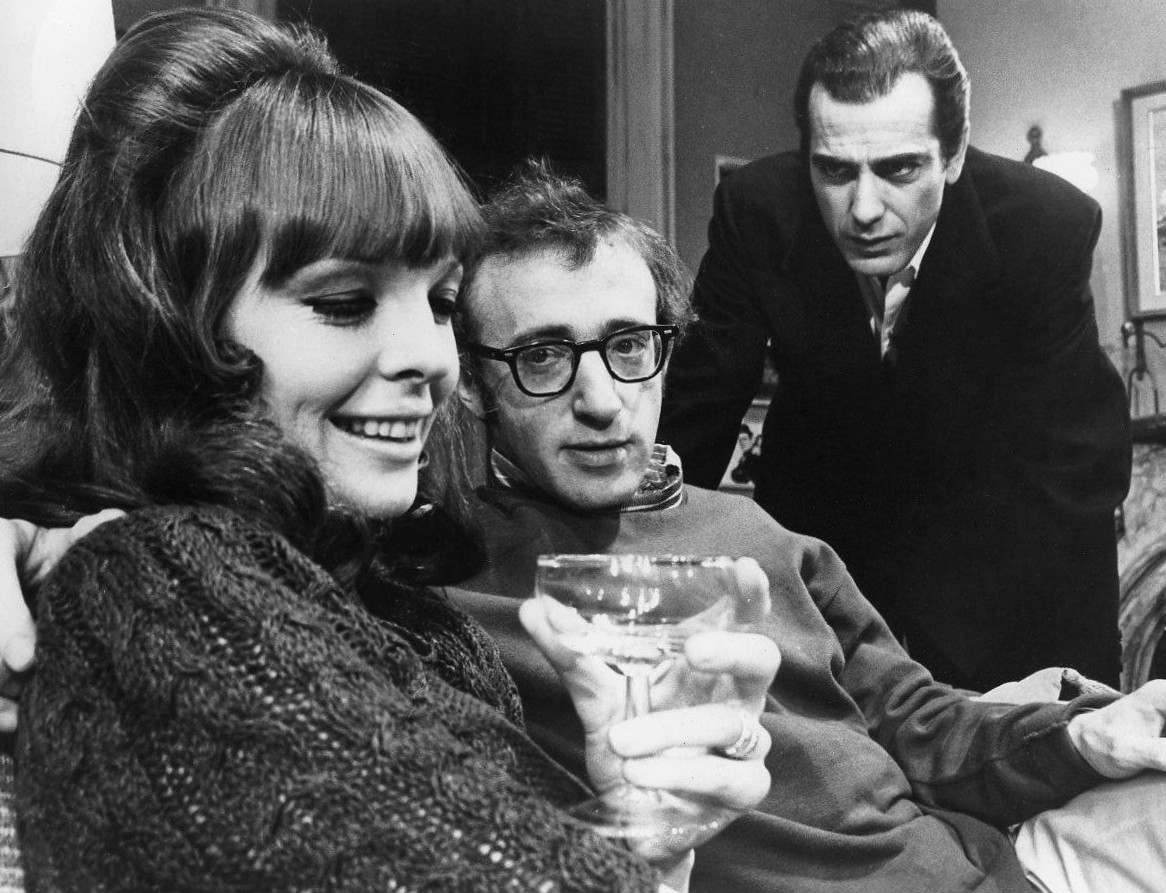
Diane Keaton, Woody Allen and Jerry Lacy in the original Broadway production of Play It Again, Sam

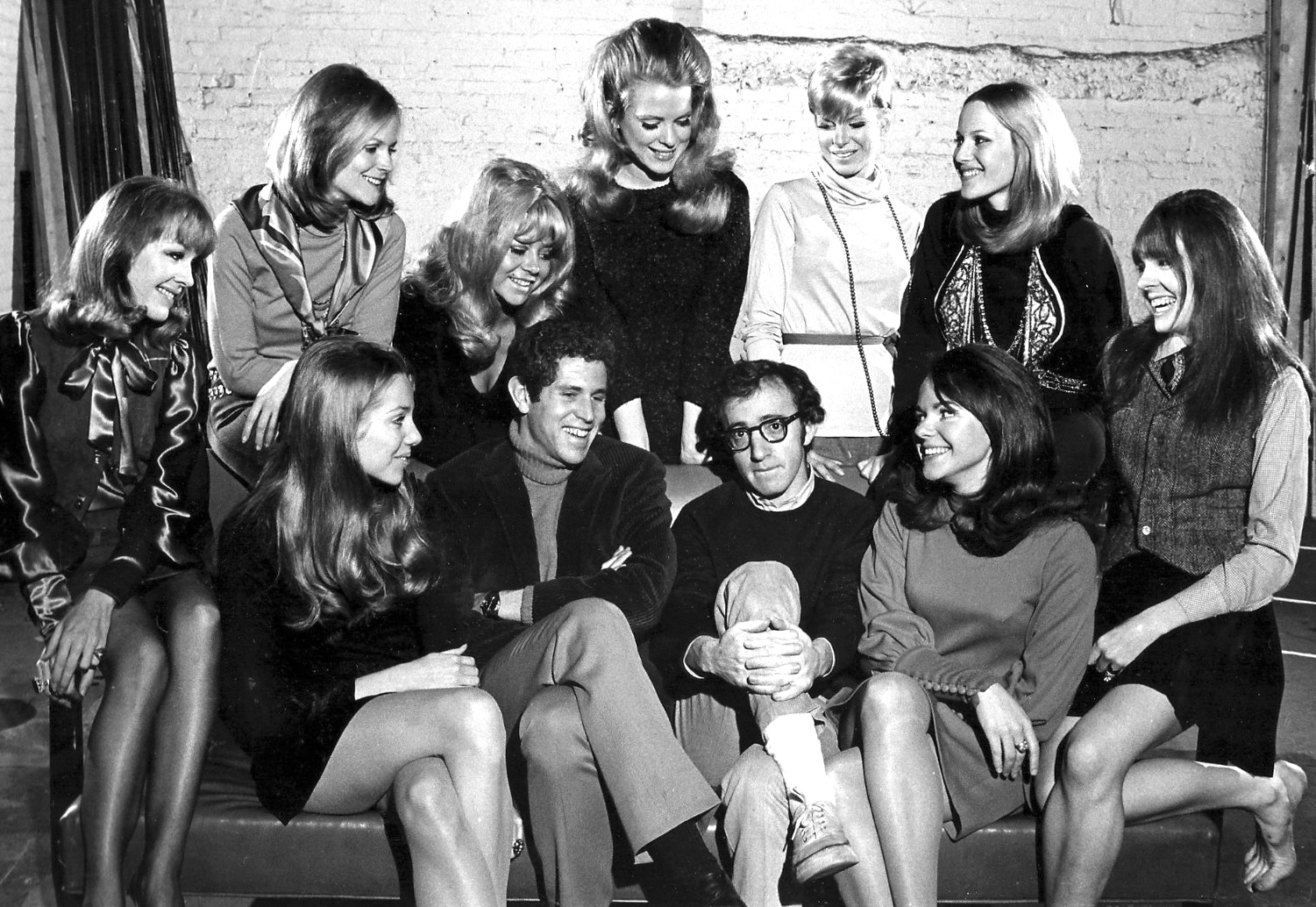
Group cast photo from Broadway production. Third from left (seated) is Tony Roberts; fourth from left is Woody Allen. Diane Keaton is on the far right. (1969)

=== Original production ===
After 2 previews, the Broadway production opened at the Broadhurst Theatre on February 12, 1969, and ran for 453 performances before closing on March 14, 1970. Directed by Joseph Hardy, the cast included Allen as Allan Felix, Diane Keaton as Linda Christie, Tony Roberts as Dick Christie, and Jerry Lacy as Bogart. Allen left the show near the end of its run and was replaced by Bob Denver.

It was while auditioning for this play that Diane Keaton first met Woody Allen and they began their professional and personal relationship.

=== London production ===
A production of Play It Again, Sam opened at the Globe Theatre in London's West End on September 11, 1969, starring Dudley Moore. Australian actor Bill Kerr played the Humphrey Bogart role.

== Reception ==
The Broadway production received generally positive reviews, including several from critics who saw it as a tribute to Bogart. UPI critic Jack Gaver thought it was "an amusing entertainment" in which "[n]othing of consequence happens". On the other hand, New York's John Simon delivered a characteristically negative review, criticizing the "rawly autobiographical" content of the play as well as Allen's performance in it. Bob Denver's performance as Allen's late-run replacement was praised by New York Times critic Clive Barnes for conveying "a genuine clown-like wistfulness" that Barnes had found lacking in Allen.

The production received three Tony Award nominations, for Hardy's direction and for the supporting performances of Keaton and Roberts.

The 1969 London production was later described in The Guardian's 2002 obituary of Moore as "a mistakenly Anglicised version" of the play. It received mixed reviews: The Daily Telegraph found Moore's "cuddly appeal" appropriate to the character, but others thought Moore failed to capture the specifically "neurotic" image of "Jewish-American manhood" that the play required, while The Spectator's Hilary Spurling found Moore to be "trapped with a fairly measly supply of jokes in a glum, transatlantic no-man's-land" and "sadly unconvincing as a gormless twit".

In his 2005 book, Acting Jewish: Negotiating Ethnicity on the American Stage & Screen, theater historian Henry Bial interpreted the play as one that "carries the banner for a Jewish masculinity that is explicitly contrasted with both Bogart and the only other male character in the play, Dick". In more general terms, Bial notes that Allen's character, like Bogart, "overcame being 'not too tall and kinda ugly' to succeed as a ladies' man."
