= Stephen Tenenbaum =

American film producer

- Born: United States
- Education: New York University
- Occupation: Film producer

Stephen Tenenbaum is an American film producer and manager.

In 2012, he was nominated for an Academy Award for the 2011 movie Midnight in Paris.

== Filmography ==
- The Curse of the Jade Scorpion (2001) (executive producer)
- Hollywood Ending (2002) (executive producer)
- Anything Else (2003) (executive producer)
- Melinda and Melinda (2004) (executive producer)
- Match Point (2005) (executive producer)
- Scoop (2006) (executive producer)
- Cassandra's Dream (2007)
- Vicky Cristina Barcelona (2008)
- Whatever Works (2009)
- You Will Meet A Tall Dark Stranger (2010)
- Midnight in Paris (2011)
- To Rome with Love (2012)
- Blue Jasmine (2013)
- Magic in the Moonlight (2014)
- Irrational Man (2015)
- Café Society (2016)
- Wonder Wheel (2017)
