= You Will Meet a Tall Dark Stranger =

2010 film by Woody Allen

- Theatrical release poster
- Directed by: Woody Allen
- Written by: Woody Allen
- Produced by: Letty Aronson; Stephen Tenenbaum; Jaume Roures
- Starring: Antonio Banderas; Josh Brolin; Anthony Hopkins; Gemma Jones; Freida Pinto; Lucy Punch; Naomi Watts; Anupam Kher
- Cinematography: Vilmos Zsigmond
- Edited by: Alisa Lepselter
- Production companies: Mediapro; Antena 3; Gravier Productions; Dippermouth
- Distributed by: Sony Pictures Classics (United States); Alta Films (Spain)
- Release dates: May 15, 2010 (Cannes); August 27, 2010 (Spain); September 22, 2010 (United States)
- Running time: 100 minutes
- Countries: Spain; United States
- Language: English
- Budget: $22 million
- Box office: $36 million

You Will Meet a Tall Dark Stranger is a 2010 comedy-drama film written and directed by Woody Allen and starring Antonio Banderas, Josh Brolin, Anthony Hopkins, Gemma Jones, Freida Pinto, Lucy Punch, and Naomi Watts. It premiered at the Cannes Film Festival on May 15, 2010, in an out-of-competition slot.

== Plot ==
Alfie and Helena divorce. Helena begins seeing a fortune teller, Cristal, for spiritual advice. Their daughter Sally has a troubled marriage with author Roy, who once wrote a successful book and is now anxiously waiting for a response from his publisher about the manuscript of his newest one. Helena helps pay their rent.

Alfie marries a prostitute, Charmaine. Roy falls for Dia, a musicologist he sees through a window near his and Sally's flat, who is engaged to another man. Sally considers having an affair with Greg, her new boss at an art gallery. Greg confesses he is having trouble at home and eventually it turns out he is having an affair with Iris, Sally's protégée. Helena begins a friendship with Jonathan, the proprietor of an occult bookshop, which develops into romance.

Roy's book is rejected. He hears that Henry, a friend who is also a writer, has died in an accident. Henry had just finished a brilliant manuscript he had shown only to Roy, and Roy decides to steal it and claim it as his work. It is well received. After a string of lunch dates with Dia, he convinces her to break off her engagement (much to the devastation of her fiancé and their families) and moves in with her.

Alfie gets into a fight with Charmaine over her high expenses. He asks Helena to make a new start with him, but she refuses. Charmaine has sex with another man and gets pregnant. Alfie wants a DNA test to discover whether he is the father, but Charmaine argues that his paternity is irrelevant.

Sally quits her job and asks Helena for a loan she promised, for setting up her own art gallery, but Helena refuses because according to Cristal it is astrologically a bad time. Sally is furious. Roy is informed that there was a mix-up of the people killed in the accident and is shocked to hear that Henry is actually in a coma and recovering.

In the end, all are dissatisfied with their choices, except for Helena. She has acquired from Cristal a belief in reincarnation and sees her life now as only one episode in her series of lives. Jonathan shares her beliefs, and they receive his deceased wife's blessing for the new relationship via a séance.

== Cast ==
- Antonio Banderas as Greg Clemente
- Josh Brolin as Roy Channing
- Anthony Hopkins as Alfie Shepridge
- Gemma Jones as Helena Shepridge
- Freida Pinto as Dia
- Lucy Punch as Charmaine Foxx
- Naomi Watts as Sally Channing
- Roger Ashton-Griffiths as Jonathan Wunch
- Ewen Bremner as Henry Strangler
- Neil Jackson as Allen
- Celia Imrie as Enid Wicklow
- Pauline Collins as Cristal Delgiorno
- Anna Friel as Iris
- Alex Macqueen as Malcolm Dodds
- Meera Syal as Dia's mother
- Anupam Kher as Dia's father
- Shaheen Khan as Dia's aunt
- Natalie Walter as Allen's sister
- Joanna David as Allen's mother
- Geoffrey Hutchings as Allen's father
- Christian McKay as poker friend
- Philip Glenister as poker friend
- Theo James as Ray Richards
- Zak Orth as The Narrator

== Production ==
Allen wrote the script because he was "interested in the concept of faith in something. This sounds so bleak when I say it, but we need some delusions to keep us going. And the people who successfully delude themselves seem happier than the people who can't. I've known people who have put their faith in religion and in fortune tellers. So it occurred to me that that was a good character for a movie: a woman who everything had failed for her, and all of a sudden, it turned out that a woman telling her fortune was helping her. The problem is, eventually, she's in for a rude awakening."

The film is the fourth Allen film shot in London, following Match Point (2005), Scoop (2006), and Cassandra's Dream (2007).

Originally, Nicole Kidman was cast in one of the lead roles. Scheduling conflicts arose because of her production company and her film Rabbit Hole (2010). She was eventually replaced by Lucy Punch.

== Release ==
The film was released in Australia on January 17, 2013.

== Reception ==
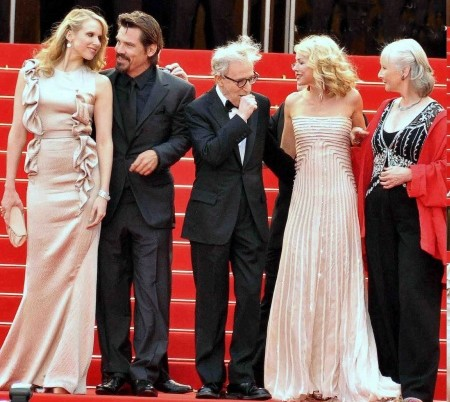
Lucy Punch, Josh Brolin, Woody Allen, Naomi Watts and Gemma Jones promoting the film at the 2010 Cannes Film Festival.

The film has received mixed reviews. Review aggregation website Rotten Tomatoes gives the film a score of 46% based on reviews from 134 critics, with an average score of 5.4 out of 10. The site's critics consensus states: "It's sporadically amusing, and typically well-cast, but You Will Meet a Tall Dark Stranger isn't one of Woody Allen's more inspired late-period efforts." Metacritic, which assigns a rating of 0-100 of top reviews from mainstream critics, calculated an average score of 51% based on 28 reviews.

Kirk Honeycutt of The Hollywood Reporter described it as "A serviceable Woody Allen comedy that trifles with its characters rather than engaging with them." A. O. Scott called Allen the "great champion of cosmic insignificance" and said the film is served up with a "wry shrug and an amusing flurry of coincidences, reversals and semi-surprises. There are hints of farce, droplets of melodrama, a few dangling loose ends and an overall mood of sloppy, tolerant cynicism."

Two reviews expressed opposing viewpoints about where the film stands among Allen's films shot in London. Owen Gleiberman of Entertainment Weekly stated "The film is notable, if that's the word, for being the first movie Allen has made in London that is every bit as bad as his most awful New York comedies, like Anything Else and Melinda and Melinda." David Gritten of The Daily Telegraph wrote, "It sounds like damning with faint praise, but Woody Allen's You Will Meet a Tall Dark Stranger is easily the best of his recent London-based films... a fanciful fable... with an idealised London as its setting." Mark Kermode also considered it the best of Allen's London films, but believed Allen was just "treading water".

Mark Asch at The L Magazine named it his 10th best film of 2010.
