= Golden Eagle Award for Best Foreign Language Film =

Annual Russian film award

- Awarded for: Best Foreign Language Film of the Year
- Country: Russia
- Presented by: National Academy of Motion Pictures Arts and Sciences of Russia
- First award: 2002
- Currently held by: 1917 (2020) (last one)
- Website: Official site of the National Academy of Motion Picture Arts and Sciences of Russia

The Golden Eagle Award for Best Foreign Language Film (Russian: Золотой Орёл за лучший зарубежный фильм в российском прокате) is one of twenty award categories presented annually by the National Academy of Motion Pictures Arts and Sciences of Russia. It is one of the Golden Eagle Awards, which were established by Nikita Mikhalkov as a counterweight to the annual Nika Awards given by the Russian Academy of Cinema Arts and Sciences. It is the only category of the Golden Eagle Award that honors non-Russian-language films.

Each year, three nominees are selected by the academy. Though infrequent, there have been occasions when all three nominees came from the same country; this happened in 2008 and 2010, when all the films were from the United States. In 2002, the first recipient of the award was Amélie. The most recent award was given in 2021 to 1917. The nomination was discontinued in 2022. The nation with the most cumulative nominations is the United States, with 38 of the 57 nominations and 13 of the 19 wins to date. Other nations with multiple nominations are United Kingdom (with twelve), France (with nine), Germany and Spain (with four) and China (with fhree).

== Nominations and awards ==
Key

Sign	Meaning
†	As an executive producer
‡	Indicates the winner

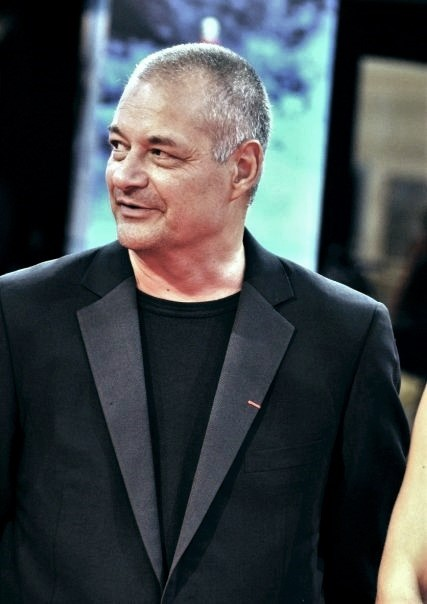
Jean-Pierre Jeunet's Amélie was the first winner.

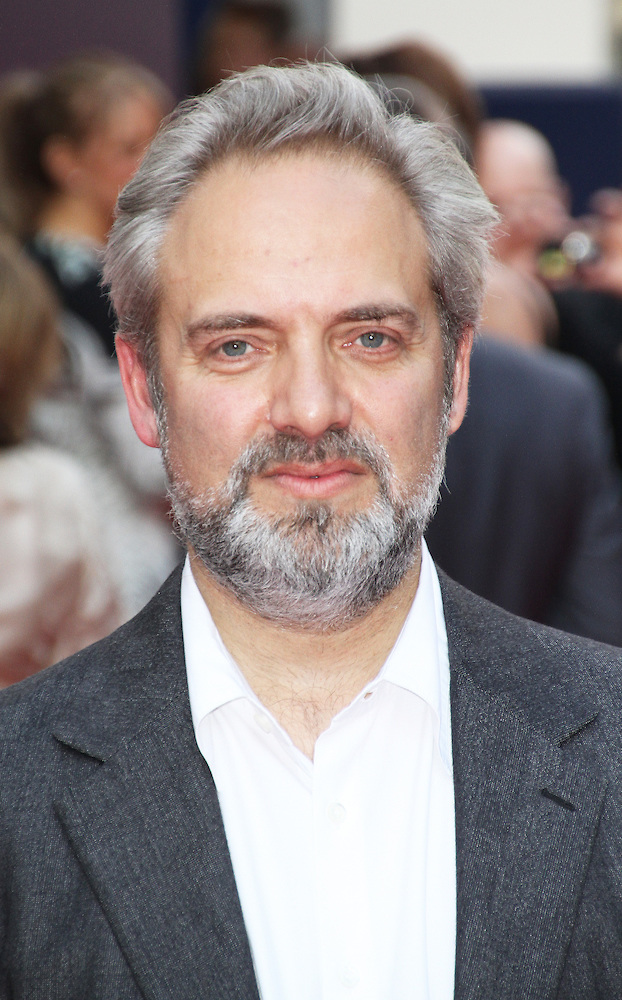
Sam Mendes's 1917 was the latest winner.

Year	International title	National title^{[A]}	Production country	Director(s)	Producer(s)	Ref
2002	Amélie‡	Le fabuleux destin d’Amélie Poulain	France	Jean-Pierre Jeunet	Jean-Marc Deschamps, Claudie Ossard	
2002	A Beautiful Mind	A Beautiful Mind	United States	Ron Howard	Ron Howard, Brian Grazer	
2002	The Piano Teacher	La Pianiste	France	Michael Haneke	Michael Katz,† Yvon Crenn†	
2003	The Pianist‡	Pianista	France	Roman Polanski	Roman Polanski, Robert Benmussa, Alain Sarde, Gene Gutowski†	
2003	Dogville	Dogville	United Kingdom	Lars von Trier	Vibeke Windeløv	
2003	Good Bye, Lenin!	Good Bye, Lenin!	Germany	Wolfgang Becker	Stefan Arndt	
2004	The Passion of the Christ‡	The Passion of the Christ	United States	Mel Gibson	Bruce Davey, Mel Gibson, Stephen McEveety, Enzo Sisti	
2004	Life Is a Miracle	La vie est un miracle!	France	Emir Kusturica	Alain Sarde, Emir Kusturica, Maja Kusturica	
2004	Lost in Translation	Lost in Translation	United States	Sofia Coppola	Ross Katz, Sofia Coppola	
2005	The Aviator‡	The Aviator	United States	Martin Scorsese	Michael Mann, Sandy Climan, Graham King, Charles Evans, Jr.	
2005	House of Flying Daggers	十面埋伏 (shí miàn mái fú)	China	Zhang Yimou	William Kong, Zhang Yimou	
2005	Madagascar	Madagascar	United States	Eric Darnell, Tom McGrath	Mireille Soria	
2006	Volver‡	Volver	Spain	Pedro Almodovar	Esther García, Agustín Almodóvar†	
2006	Match Point	Match Point	United Kingdom	Woody Allen	Letty Aronson, Gareth Wiley, Lucy Darwin	
2006	Munich	Munich	United States	Steven Spielberg	Kathleen Kennedy, Steven Spielberg, Barry Mendel, Colin Wilson	
2007	The Queen‡	The Queen	France	Stephen Frears	Andy Harries, Christine Langan, Tracey Seaward, Francois Ivernel,†; Cameron McCracken,† Scott Rudin†	
2007	Apocalypto	Apocalypto	United States	Mel Gibson	Mel Gibson, Farhad Safinia, Bruce Davey, Ned Dowd	
2007	Babel	Babel	United States	Alejandro Gonzalez Inarritu	Alejandro González Iñárritu, Steve Golin, Jon Kilik	
2008	There Will Be Blood‡	There Will Be Blood	United States	Paul Thomas Anderson	Paul Thomas Anderson, Daniel Lupi, JoAnne Sellar, Scott Rudin	
2008	No Country for Old Men	No Country for Old Men	United States	Joel Coen, Ethan Coen	Joel Coen and Ethan Coen, Scott Rudin	
2008	Hancock	Hancock	United States	Peter Berg	Akiva Goldsman, James Lassiter, Michael Mann, Will Smith	
2009	Slumdog Millionaire‡	Slumdog Millionaire	United States	Danny Boyle	Christian Colson	
2009	Vicky Cristina Barcelona	Vicky Cristina Barcelona	Spain	Woody Allen	Letty Aronson, Jaume Roures, Stephen Tenenbaum, Gareth Wiley	
2009	Inglourious Basterds	Inglourious Basterds	Germany	Quentin Tarantino	Lawrence Bender	
2010	Avatar‡	Avatar	United States	James Cameron	James Cameron, Jon Landau	
2010	Alice in Wonderland	Alice in Wonderland	United States	Tim Burton	Richard D. Zanuck, Joe Roth, Suzanne Todd, Jennifer Todd	
2010	Up	Up	United States	Pete Docter	Jonas Rivera, John Lasseter,† Andrew Stanton†	
2011	The King's Speech‡	The King's Speech	United Kingdom	Tom Hooper	Iain Canning, Emile Sherman, Gareth Unwin	
2011	Melancholia	Melancholia	Denmark	Lars von Trier	Meta Louise Foldager, Louise Vesth	
2011	Black Swan	Black Swan	United States	Darren Aronofsky	Ari Handel, Scott Franklin, Mike Medavoy, Arnold Messer, Brian Oliver	
2012	The Artist‡	The Artist	France	Michel Hazanavicius	Thomas Langmann	
2012	The Dark Knight Rises	The Dark Knight Rises	United States	Christopher Nolan	Emma Thomas, Christopher Nolan, Charles Roven	
2012	Tinker Tailor Soldier Spy	Tinker Tailor Soldier Spy	United Kingdom	Tomas Alfredson	Tim Bevan, Eric Fellner, Robyn Slovo	
2013	Gravity‡	Gravity	United States	Alfonso Cuarón	Alfonso Cuarón, David Heyman	
2013	The Great Gatsby	The Great Gatsby	United States	Baz Luhrmann	Baz Luhrmann, Catherine Knapman, Douglas Wick, Lucy Fisher, Catherine Martin	
2013	Argo	Argo	United States	Ben Affleck	Grant Heslov, Ben Affleck, George Clooney	
2014	The Grand Budapest Hotel‡	The Grand Budapest Hotel	United States	Wes Anderson	Wes Anderson, Scott Rudin, Steven Rales, Jeremy Dawson	
2014	The Wolf of Wall Street	The Wolf of Wall Street	United States	Martin Scorsese	Martin Scorsese, Leonardo DiCaprio, Riza Aziz, Joey McFarland, Emma Tillinger Koskoff	
2014	Blue Is the Warmest Colour	La Vie d'Adèle : Chapitres 1 et 2	France; Belgium; Spain	Abdellatif Kechiche	Abdellatif Kechiche, Brahim Chioua, Vincent Maraval	
2015	Birdman‡	Birdman	United States	Alejandro González Iñárritu	Alejandro González Iñárritu, Arnon Milchan, John Lesher, James W. Skotchdopole	
2015	The Theory of Everything	The Theory of Everything	United Kingdom; Japan; United States	James Marsh	Tim Bevan, Eric Fellner, Lisa Bruce, Anthony McCarten	
2015	The Martian	The Martian	United Kingdom; United States	Ridley Scott	Simon Kinberg, Ridley Scott, Michael Schaefer, Mark Huffam	
2016	The Revenant‡	The Revenant	United States	Alejandro González Iñárritu	Arnon Milchan, Steve Golin, Alejandro G. Iñárritu, Mary Parent, Keith Redmon, James W. Skotchdopole	
2016	Café Society	Café Society	United States	Woody Allen	Letty Aronson, Stephen Tenenbaum, Edward Walson	
2016	Bridge of Spies	Bridge of Spies	United States; Germany	Steven Spielberg	Steven Spielberg, Marc Platt, Kristie Macosko Krieger	
2017	Loving Vincent‡	Loving Vincent	Poland; United Kingdom; United States	Dorota Kobiela, Hugh Welchman	Hugh Welchman, Ivan Mactaggart, Sean M. Bobbitt	
2017	Dunkirk	Dunkirk	United Kingdom; United States; France; Netherlands	Christopher Nolan	Emma Thomas, Christopher Nolan	
2017	La La Land	La La Land	United States	Damien Chazelle	Fred Berger, Jordan Horowitz, Gary Gilbert, Marc Platt	
2018	Three Billboards Outside Ebbing, Missouri‡	Three Billboards Outside Ebbing, Missouri	United Kingdom; United States	Martin McDonagh	Graham Broadbent, Peter Czernin, Martin McDonagh	
2018	The Shape of Water	The Shape of Water	United States	Guillermo del Toro	Guillermo del Toro, J. Miles Dale	
2018	A Star Is Born	A Star Is Born	United States	Bradley Cooper	Bill Gerber, Jon Peters, Bradley Cooper, Todd Phillips, Lynette Howell Taylor	
2019	The Lion King‡	The Lion King	United States	Jon Favreau	Jon Favreau, Jeffrey Silver, Karen Gilchrist	
2019	Green Book	Green Book	United States	Peter Farrelly	Jim Burke, Brian Hayes Currie, Peter Farrelly, Nick Vallelonga, Charles B. Wessler	
2019	Once Upon a Time in Hollywood	Once Upon a Time in Hollywood	United States; United Kingdom; China	Quentin Tarantino	David Heyman, Shannon McIntosh, Quentin Tarantino	
2020	1917‡	1917	United States; United Kingdom; India; Spain; Canada; China	Sam Mendes	Sam Mendes, Pippa Harris, Jayne-Ann Tenggren, Callum McDougall, Brian Oliver	
2020	Pinocchio	Pinocchio	Italy; France; United Kingdom	Matteo Garrone	Matteo Garrone, Jean Labadie, Anne-Laure Labadie, Jeremy Thomas, Paolo Del Brocco	
2020	Enfant Terrible	Enfant Terrible	Germany	Oskar Roehler	Markus Zimmer	

A: (Titles in brackets are transliterated)
