= Irrational Man (film) =

2015 film by Woody Allen

- Theatrical release poster
- Directed by: Woody Allen
- Written by: Woody Allen
- Produced by: Letty Aronson; Stephen Tenenbaum; Edward Walson
- Starring: Jamie Blackley; Joaquin Phoenix; Parker Posey; Emma Stone
- Cinematography: Darius Khondji
- Edited by: Alisa Lepselter
- Production companies: Perdido Productions; Gravier Productions
- Distributed by: Sony Pictures Classics
- Release dates: May 16, 2015 (Cannes); July 17, 2015 (United States)
- Running time: 95 minutes
- Country: United States
- Language: English
- Budget: $11 million
- Box office: $29.1 million

Irrational Man is a 2015 American mystery comedy drama film written and directed by Woody Allen, and starring Jamie Blackley, Joaquin Phoenix, Parker Posey, and Emma Stone. The film had its world premiere at the Cannes Film Festival on May 16, 2015. It was given a limited theatrical release in the United States on July 17, 2015, by Sony Pictures Classics, followed by a wide release on August 7.

== Plot ==
Philosophy professor Abe Lucas joins the faculty at Braylin College in Rhode Island. He is experiencing an existential crisis, is depressed, sees no meaning in his life, and drinks excessively. Despite this, he catches the eye of two women: chemistry professor Rita Richards and gifted student Jill Pollard.

Rita lives with her husband, Paul, but is dissatisfied with her marriage. Abe sleeps with Rita, but becomes more depressed when he fails to get an erection during their first sexual encounter. Jill is in a serious relationship with Roy and lives with her parents. Abe initially maintains a platonic relationship with Jill, discussing Dostoevsky, Kant, and other philosophical works.

At lunch in a diner, Abe and Jill overhear a conversation in the next booth. A distraught woman relates to her companions that she will lose her children in a custody battle in family court because of a series of manipulative rulings by a judge that have drained her funds. The unethical judge has connections to the opposing side. Troubled by the injustice and justifying the ethics philosophically, Abe decides to secretly help the woman by murdering the judge. Abe reasons he is unlikely to be caught because he does not know the judge and has no traceable motive.

With a new purpose in life, Abe's depression is lifted. He becomes happier and is able to have sex with Rita, who praises him for his savagery and asks him to run away with her to Spain. Despite this, Rita questions whether he has slept with Jill, a topic Rita thinks is on everyone's lips at the university.

To learn the judge's habits, Abe follows him for a while. After his jog, the judge always buys orange juice from a vendor and sits on a bench to cool down. Abe decides the best way to kill him is to poison him. Stealing a key to the college's chemistry lab from Rita, Abe furtively steals cyanide but is seen in the lab by a student. He buys a juice from the same vendor as the judge, puts the poison in his own juice cup, sits down on the same bench, then switches the juices while the judge reads a newspaper.

The judge dies from cyanide poisoning. Abe feels reborn, telling himself he has finally done something worthwhile by ridding the world of an evil man. His and Jill's friendship blossoms into a romance. Learning of the relationship, Roy breaks up with Jill.

Despite Abe's careful planning, Jill and Rita, who are friendly, begin to suspect Abe's involvement in the murder. They piece together clues, such as the missing key and the student's account of seeing Abe in the chemistry lab. Regardless, Rita decides that even if he is guilty, she wants to leave Paul and move to Spain with Abe.

An increasingly suspicious Jill breaks into Abe's house through a window and discovers incriminating notes scrawled in Dostoevsky's Crime and Punishment, citing the murdered judge's name, references to Raskolnikov, and Hannah Arendt's quote on the "banality of evil". When Jill confronts him, Abe admits his guilt, and she ends their romance. When an innocent man is accused of the crime, Jill pressures Abe to surrender himself to the police, warning that she will report him.

Having lately begun to appreciate life, Abe tries to murder Jill by shoving her down an elevator shaft, but he trips and falls down the shaft to his death. Some time later, having reconciled with Roy, Jill stares out at the sea and reflects on her experiences with Abe, asserting that the trauma has lessened in intensity with time but can resurface.

== Cast ==
- Jamie Blackley as Roy
- Joaquin Phoenix as Abe Lucas
- Parker Posey as Rita Richards
- Emma Stone as Jill Pollard
- Betsy Aidem as Mrs. Pollard
- Ethan Phillips as Mr. Pollard
- Joe Stapleton as professor
- Jack Haven (Note: Credited as Brigette Lundy-Paine) as Braylin student
- Robert Petkoff as Paul
- Tamara Hickey as professor in cafeteria
- Sophie von Haselberg as April
- Ben Rosenfield as April's friend
- Meredith Hagner as Sandy
- Susan Pourfar as Carol
- Tom Kemp as Judge Spangler
- Nancy Giles as President’s Assistant

== Production ==
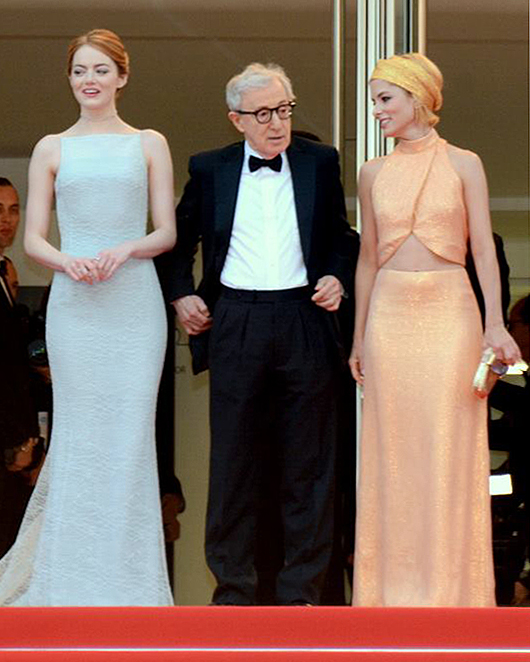
Emma Stone, Woody Allen, and Parker Posey promoting the film at the 2015 Cannes Film Festival

On May 2, 2014, it was announced that Woody Allen would write and direct an upcoming film in which Joaquin Phoenix would star. On May 6, Emma Stone joined the cast, marking her second straight collaboration with Allen, as she had co-starred in Allen's previous comedy Magic in the Moonlight. On July 24, Parker Posey and Jamie Blackley also joined the cast of the film, which Allen produced along with his sister Letty Aronson and Stephen Tenenbaum.

Principal photography began on July 7, 2014, in Newport, Rhode Island, and lasted until late August. The campus of Salve Regina University in Newport served as the location for the fictional Braylin College. Crews were spotted filming outside at The Fastnet Pub in Newport.

The film was the last produced by Jack Rollins, who had produced Allen's films since the beginning of his filmmaking career in the late 1960s, before his death in June 2015.

== Release ==
On January 29, 2015, it was announced that Sony Pictures Classics had acquired all North American rights to the film, marking it the eighth Woody Allen film to be released by Classics. The film's first trailer was released on April 29, 2015.

The film had its world premiere at the Cannes Film Festival on May 16, 2015. The film began a limited theatrical release in the United States on July 17, 2015, and later a wide release on August 7.

== Reception ==
=== Box office ===
Irrational Man grossed $4 million in the United States and Canada, and $25.1 million in other territories, for a worldwide total of $29.1 million.

=== Critical response ===
Irrational Man received mixed reviews from critics. On the review aggregator website Rotten Tomatoes, the film holds an approval rating of 47% based on 206 reviews, with an average rating of 5.6/10. The website's critics consensus reads, "Irrational Man may prove rewarding for the most ardent Joaquin Phoenix fans or Woody Allen apologists, but all others most likely need not apply." Metacritic, which uses a weighted average, assigned the film a score of 53 out of 100, based on 43 critics, indicating "mixed or average" reviews.

Peter Bradshaw of The Guardian gave the film two stars out of five, stating, "Irrational Man is another of the amiable but forgettable and underpowered jeux d'esprit that he produces with an almost somnambulist consistency and persistence. It's a tongue-in-cheek mystery which is neither quite scary and serious enough to be suspenseful, nor witty or ironic enough to count as a comedy."

Matt Zoller Seitz of RogerEbert.com gave the movie 1.5 stars out of four, writing, "It is not merely a bad film. It is a collection of notes for a film that never quite evolved to the rough draft stage, much less cohered into a finished movie. That makes it more dispiriting than other notorious Woody Allen misfires, like Celebrity and Curse of the Jade Scorpion and Scoop, where at least you could kind of see what the filmmaker was going for, and sense the movie lurching in a certain direction even as it kept stumbling over its shoelaces and crashing into things."

Tim Robey of The Daily Telegraph stated, "The main problem is the philosophical purchase Allen thinks his film is gaining: far from profundity of any sort, it ultimately peddles the thesis that killing people out of daft, misplaced idealism isn't an especially wizard plan. Such schemes are all too apt to backfire – but Allen's old touch is missing here, and even the backfiring is a damp squib."

Richard Brody of The New Yorker added, "when the Dostoyevskian drama kicks in, Allen's venomous speculations bring to the fore a tangle of conundrums and ironies, as if the director, nearing eighty, already had one foot in the next world and were looking back at this one with derision and rue." Eric Kohn of IndieWire gave the film B grade, observing, "Now comes Irrational Man, a similar fusion of Allen's dominant modes that's decidedly more minor, but still a competent showcase of the way the productive filmmaker's voice remains effective with the right synthesis of material and cast."
