= Vicky Cristina Barcelona =

2008 film by Woody Allen

- Theatrical release poster
- Directed by: Woody Allen
- Written by: Woody Allen
- Produced by: Letty Aronson; Jaume Roures; Stephen Tenenbaum; Gareth Wiley
- Starring: Javier Bardem; Patricia Clarkson; Penélope Cruz; Kevin Dunn; Rebecca Hall; Scarlett Johansson; Chris Messina
- Cinematography: Javier Aguirresarobe
- Edited by: Alisa Lepselter
- Production companies: Mediapro; Wild Bunch
- Distributed by: Warner Bros. Pictures(Spain); Metro-Goldwyn-Mayer; The Weinstein Company (North America)
- Release dates: May 17, 2008 (Cannes Film Festival); August 15, 2008 (United States); September 19, 2008 (Spain)
- Running time: 97 minutes
- Countries: Spain; United States
- Languages: English; Spanish
- Budget: $15 million
- Box office: $96 million

Vicky Cristina Barcelona is a 2008 romantic comedy drama film written and directed by Woody Allen. The film stars Javier Bardem, Penélope Cruz, Rebecca Hall and Scarlett Johansson. The plot centers on two American women, Vicky and Cristina, who spend a summer in Barcelona, where they meet an artist, Juan Antonio, who is attracted to both of them, while still enamored with his mentally and emotionally unstable ex-wife, María Elena. The film was shot in Barcelona, Avilés, and Oviedo, and was Allen's fourth consecutive film shot outside the United States.

Vicky Cristina Barcelona premiered at the 2008 Cannes Film Festival on May 17, 2008, and received a rolling worldwide general release that began on August 15, 2008 in the United States by Metro-Goldwyn-Mayer and The Weinstein Company, and on September 19, 2008 in Spain by Warner Bros. Pictures. The film emerged as a commercial success at the box office, becoming one of Allen's highest-grossing films by grossing $96 million against a $15 million budget. It received widespread critical acclaim upon release, with particular praise directed towards Cruz's performance.

Cruz won the Academy Award, BAFTA Award and Independent Spirit Award for Best Supporting Actress, in addition to SAG, Golden Globe and Critics Choice nominations in the same category. At the 66th Golden Globe Awards, Vicky Cristina Barcelona received 4 nominations, including Best Actor in a Motion Picture – Musical or Comedy (Bardem), Best Actress in a Motion Picture – Musical or Comedy (Hall) and Best Supporting Actress – Motion Picture (Cruz), winning Best Motion Picture – Musical or Comedy.

== Plot ==
Vicky and Cristina visit Barcelona for the summer, staying with Vicky's distant relative Judy and her husband Mark. While the two are great friends, Vicky is practical and traditional in her approach to love and commitment and is engaged to the reliable Doug, whereas Cristina imagines herself to be a nonconformist, spontaneous but unsure of what she wants from life or love.

At an art exhibition, Cristina is intrigued by artist Juan Antonio, who Judy says has suffered a violent relationship with his ex-wife. Later, he brazenly approaches Vicky and Cristina to invite them to join him right away for the weekend in the city of Oviedo, traveling there in a small plane he flies himself, for sightseeing, fine dining and drinking, and hopefully, having sex with both young women. Cristina is won over by the offer almost at once, but Vicky is unimpressed and reluctant; she, however, eventually decides to accompany her friend anyway, mainly to watch over her.

At the end of their first day, Vicky refuses to join Juan Antonio in his hotel room, citing her fidelity to Doug, but Cristina accepts his invitation immediately. Right before they want to hook up, Cristina suddenly falls ill with digestive complaints, and is put to bed with food poisoning. Vicky and Juan Antonio spend the weekend together alone while they wait for Cristina to recover. Vicky gradually changes her opinion of Juan Antonio as he tells her about his tumultuous relationship with his ex-wife, María Elena. Vicky accompanies him to visit his father, an old poet, and then becomes deeply moved by a Spanish guitar performance later that evening. She finally consents to Juan Antonio's advances as they walk through a grove of trees in the dark. The next day, with Cristina feeling better, the three of them fly back to Barcelona.

Feeling guilty, Vicky does not mention the incident to Cristina, and the two begin to grow apart. Vicky throws herself into her studies while Cristina and Juan Antonio take up a relationship. Cristina then moves in with Juan Antonio and begins to discover more about his past. After learning that María Elena attempted to kill herself, Juan Antonio takes her to his home, where Cristina already lives. After some defiance, the two women grow fond of each other. Cristina realizes that the ex-spouses are still in love, and María Elena suggests that Cristina may be the element that can give balance and stability to their relationship. All three become romantically involved with one another.

In the meantime, Vicky is joined in Spain by an enthusiastic Doug and the two get married. Vicky becomes secretly jealous after Cristina describes her new life with Juan Antonio, and later realizes she is unsatisfied in her married life with Doug and is still attracted to Juan Antonio. Learning that Judy is similarly unhappy in her marriage, she confides to her, and Judy, who sees her younger self in Vicky, decides to bring Juan Antonio and Vicky together. Meanwhile, Cristina becomes restless and at some point decides to leave Juan Antonio and María Elena; without her, their relationship quickly falls apart again.

As the summer winds to a close, Judy arranges for Juan Antonio and Vicky to meet at a party. Juan Antonio begs Vicky to meet him again privately before leaving Spain, which she finally accepts, lying to Doug in the process. At his home, Juan Antonio seduces and wins Vicky over again, but they are interrupted by María Elena who bursts in with a gun, firing wildly as Juan Antonio tries to calm her. Vicky gets shot in the hand in the process, and leaves, shouting they are insane and she could never live like this. She confesses the entire story to Cristina, who never realized how Vicky felt about Juan Antonio, and wishes she could have helped her. Doug, Vicky and Cristina return to the United States. Doug never learns what happened; Vicky goes back to her married life; and Cristina is back where she started, still unsure of what she wants, but certain of what she doesn't want.

== Cast ==
- Rebecca Hall as Vicky
- Scarlett Johansson as Cristina
- Javier Bardem as Juan Antonio Gonzalo
- Penélope Cruz as María Elena
- Patricia Clarkson as Judy Nash
- Kevin Dunn as Mark Nash
- Chris Messina as Doug
- Pablo Schreiber as Ben
- Carrie Preston as Sally
- Zak Orth as Adam
- Julio Perillán as Charles
- Christopher Evan Welch as Narrator

Spanish actor Joan Pera, who dubbed Allen's voice in the Spanish-language versions of his previous films, makes a cameo appearance.

== Production ==
In 2007, controversy arose in Catalonia over the public funding granted to the film, as the high-profile film was presumed not to have needed it; Barcelona's city hall provided one million euro and the Generalitat de Catalunya (Government of Catalonia) half a million, totaling ten percent of the film's budget.

This was the third time Woody Allen and Scarlett Johansson had worked together, following Match Point (2005) and Scoop (2006). This also marked the second time Rebecca Hall and Johansson had worked together, the first time being in The Prestige (2006).

The film featured several paintings by Catalan artist Agustí Puig and included several examples of the work of architect Antoni Gaudí, including his Park Güell.

== Reception ==
=== Box office ===
Vicky Cristina Barcelona grossed $23.2 million in the United States and Canada, and $73.2 million in other territories, for a worldwide first of $96 million, against its $15 million budget. It is one of Allen's highest-grossing films.

=== Critical response ===
On Rotten Tomatoes the film holds an approval rating of 80% based on 213 reviews, with an average rating of 6.9/10. The site's critics consensus reads: "A beguiling tragicomedy, Vicky Cristina Barcelona charms with beautiful views of the Spanish city and a marvelously well-matched cast." Metacritic gave the film a weighted average score of 70 out of 100, based on 36 critics, indicating "generally favorable reviews".

Scott Tobias wrote in The A.V. Club that it was "a witty and ambiguous film that's simultaneously intoxicating and suffused with sadness and doubt." Richard Roeper suggested that Cruz should receive an Academy Award nomination for her performance in the film. Mick LaSalle of the San Francisco Chronicle praised the film as "the work of a confident and mature artist", referring to Allen. Manohla Dargis of The New York Times wrote "Although Vicky Cristina Barcelona trips along winningly, carried by the beauty of its locations and stars — and all the gauzy romanticism those enchanted places and people imply — it reverberates with implacable melancholy, a sense of loss." Richard Corliss ended his review of the film with "Vicky Cristina Barcelona has neither the sardonic heft of Max Ophüls's La Ronde (1950) nor the emotional precision of Ingmar Bergman's Smiles of a Summer Night (1955), two films that also dance the change-partners gavotte. But the film is so engaging so much of the time that it feels like a modest rejuvenation: evidence that a summer in Spain can do wonders for a writer-director who may not have outlived his prime." Ian Freer of Empire gave the film 4 out of 5, and wrote "within Allen's recent output, Vicky Cristina Barcelona is a highlight. See it for beautiful locales, an ambivalent look at human relationships and a clutch of great performances, particularly from Cruz."

=== Accolades ===
The film appeared on many critics' top-ten lists of the best films of 2008 including;

- 5th – David Denby, The New Yorker
- 5th – Ray Bennett, The Hollywood Reporter
- 5th – Bob Mondello, NPR
- 7th – Joe Morgenstern, The Wall Street Journal
- 7th – Keith Phipps, The A.V. Club
- 7th – Kyle Smith, New York Post
- 7th – Steve Rea, The Philadelphia Inquirer
- 8th – Mick LaSalle, San Francisco Chronicle
- 9th – Carrie Rickey, The Philadelphia Inquirer
- 10th – Michael Sragow, The Baltimore Sun

Year	Award	Category	Recipient(s)	Result	Ref.
2008	Academy Awards	Best Supporting Actress	Penélope Cruz	Won	
2008	National Board of Review Awards	Top Ten Independent Films	Vicky Cristina Barcelona	Won	
2008	Golden Globe Awards	Best Film – Musical or Comedy	Vicky Cristina Barcelona	Won	
2008	Golden Globe Awards	Best Actor – Musical or Comedy	Javier Bardem	Nominated	
2008	Golden Globe Awards	Best Actress – Musical or Comedy	Rebecca Hall	Nominated	
2008	Golden Globe Awards	Best Supporting Actress	Penélope Cruz	Nominated	
2008	British Academy Film Awards	Best Supporting Actress	Penélope Cruz	Won	
2008	Screen Actors Guild Awards	Best Supporting Actress	Penélope Cruz	Nominated	
2008	Writers Guild of America Awards	Best Original Screenplay	Woody Allen	Nominated	
2008	Independent Spirit Awards	Best Actor	Javier Bardem	Nominated	
2008	Independent Spirit Awards	Best Supporting Actress	Penélope Cruz	Won	
2008	Independent Spirit Awards	Best Screenplay	Woody Allen	Won	
2009	Gaudí Awards	Best Film in Non-Catalan Language	Vicky Cristina Barcelona	Won	
2009	Gaudí Awards	Best Actor	Javier Bardem	Nominated	
2009	Gaudí Awards	Best Supporting Actress	Penélope Cruz	Won	
2009	Gaudí Awards	Best Musical Score	Giulia y Los Tellarini	Won	
2009	Gaudí Awards	Best Cinematography	Javier Aguirresarobe	Nominated	
2009	Gaudí Awards	Best Sound	Peter Glossop, David Wahnson & Shaun Mills	Nominated	
2009	Golden Eagle Award	Best Foreign Language Film	Vicky Cristina Barcelona	Nominated	
2008	Gotham Awards	Best Ensemble Cast	Javier Bardem, Penélope Cruz, Rebecca Hall & Scarlett Johansson	Won	
2008	Gotham Awards	Breakthrough Performer	Rebecca Hall	Nominated	
2008	Critics' Choice Movie Awards	Best Comedy Film	Vicky Cristina Barcelona	Nominated	
2008	Critics' Choice Movie Awards	Best Supporting Actress	Penelope Cruz	Nominated	

== See also ==
- List of performances of LGBTQ Characters Nominated for or Awarded Best Actress in a Supporting Role
