= Cassandra's Dream (soundtrack) =

Soundtrack album by Philip Glass
- Genre: Soundtrack
- Length: 30:54
- Label: Orange Mountain Music
- Producer: Michael Riesman

Cassandra's Dream is the soundtrack to the 2008 Woody Allen film Cassandra's Dream and features an original orchestral score by Philip Glass. The soundtrack was released in 2007 by Orange Mountain Music.

== Track listing ==
1. "Cassandra's Dream" - 2:18
2. "Buying the Boat" - 1:45
3. "Sailing" - 1:53
4. "The Cockney Brothers" - 1:24
5. "A Drive In the Country" - 1:38
6. "Angela" - 1:13
7. "Howard's Request / In the Apartment" - 3:27
8. "The Pursuit & Murder In the Park" - 6:44
9. "Suspicion" - 2:26
10. "The Plot Unravels" - 1:46
11. "Death On the Boat" - 3:31
12. "Cassandra's Dream (Finale)" - 2:57

All compositions by Philip Glass.
