= American Cinema Editors Awards 2009 =

59th ACE Eddie Awards
- Presented by: American Cinema Editors
- Date: February 15, 2009
- Site: The Beverly Hilton, Beverly Hills, California

Highlights
- Best Film: Drama: Slumdog Millionaire
- Best Film: Musical or Comedy: WALL-E

The 59th American Cinema Editors Eddie Awards, which were presented on Sunday, February 15, 2009, at the Beverly Hilton Hotel, honored the best editors in films and television.

== Winners and nominees ==
=== Film ===
Best Edited Feature Film – Dramatic:

- Chris Dickens – Slumdog Millionaire
  - Kirk Baxter and Angus Wall – The Curious Case of Benjamin Button
  - Lee Smith – The Dark Knight
  - Mike Hill and Dan Hanley – Frost/Nixon
  - Elliot Graham – Milk

Best Edited Feature Film – Comedy or Musical:

- Stephen Schaffer – WALL-E
  - Jon Gregory – In Bruges
  - Leslie Walker – Mamma Mia!
  - Greg Hayden – Tropic Thunder
  - Alisa Lepselter – Vicky Cristina Barcelona

Best Edited Documentary Film:

- Jinx Godfrey – Man on Wire
  - Steve Audette – Bush's War
  - Stuart Levy – Chicago 10

=== Television ===
Best Edited Half-Hour Series – Television:

- Meg Reticker – 30 Rock for "Reunion"
- Jeff Groth – Entourage for "Playing with Fire"
- Dean Holland and David Rogers – The Office for "Goodbye Toby

Best Edited One-Hour Series – Commercial Television:

- Craig Bench – Boston Legal for "True Love"
- Lynne Willingham – Breaking Bad for "Pilot"
- Karen Stern – Law & Order for "Authority"

Best Edited One-Hour Series – Non-Commercial Television:

- Eric Sears – Crash for "Los Muertos"
- Michael Ruscio – True Blood for "Strange Love"
- Kate Sanford – The Wire for "More with Less"

Best Edited Miniseries or Film – Commercial Television:

- Scott Powell – 24: Redemption
- David J. Siegel – The Librarian: Curse of the Judas Chalice
- Robert Florio, Mark J. Goldman, Stephen Semel, and Henk Van Eeghen – Lost: There's No Place Like Home

Best Edited Miniseries or Film – Non-Commercial Television:

- Andy Keir – Bernard and Doris
- Melanie Oliver – John Adams for "Independence"
- Alan Baumgarten – Recount

== Honorary Awards ==
- Richard Donner – Golden Eddie Award
- Sidney Katz & Arthur Schmidt – Career Achievement Award
