= A Rainy Day in New York =

2019 film by Woody Allen

- Theatrical release poster
- Directed by: Woody Allen
- Written by: Woody Allen
- Produced by: Letty Aronson; Erika Aronson
- Starring: Timothée Chalamet; Elle Fanning; Selena Gomez; Jude Law; Diego Luna; Liev Schreiber
- Cinematography: Vittorio Storaro
- Edited by: Alisa Lepselter
- Production companies: Gravier Productions; Perdido Productions
- Distributed by: MPI Media Group; Signature Entertainment
- Release dates: July 26, 2019 (Poland); October 9, 2020 (United States)
- Running time: 92 minutes
- Country: United States
- Language: English
- Budget: $25 million
- Box office: $23.8 million

A Rainy Day in New York is a 2019 American romantic comedy film written and directed by Woody Allen, and starring Timothée Chalamet, Elle Fanning, Selena Gomez, Jude Law, Diego Luna, and Liev Schreiber. The film follows the romantic exploits of two young college students, Gatsby and Ashleigh (Chalamet and Fanning), while on a weekend visit to New York City, Gatsby's hometown. He hopes to deepen their relationship while she is in the city to interview a film director (Schreiber) for their college newspaper.

The film was completed in 2018, but its distributor, Amazon Studios, halted its release following the Me Too movement and the resurgence of the sexual abuse allegation against Allen. It was released in Poland on July 26, 2019, followed by releases in multiple European, South American, and Asian countries. It was released in the United States on October 9, 2020, by MPI Media Group and Signature Entertainment. The film received generally mixed reviews from critics.

== Plot ==
Gatsby Welles, the brainy but eccentric son of wealthy New York City-based parents, is a student at Yardley College, a liberal arts school in upstate New York. He is also a successful gambler. When his girlfriend, Ashleigh Enright, a journalism major from Tucson, has to travel to Manhattan to interview esteemed independent film director Roland Pollard for the student newspaper, Gatsby tags along, planning a romantic weekend in the city, while trying to avoid his parents who are holding a gala in the evening, and with whom he has a conflicted relationship.

Ashleigh's interview with Pollard is supposed to last one hour, but the director invites her to a private screening of his new film, which ruins her plans with Gatsby, much to his dismay. Strolling alone through New York, Gatsby bumps into a school friend who tells him about another friend's short film shoot nearby. He goes to the set and agrees to stand in for a missing actor for a shot that involves kissing his co-star. To Gatsby's surprise, the actress turns out to be Chan Tyrell, the younger sister of a former girlfriend. The two of them run into each other again when they both hail the same cab. Gatsby's romantic plans with Ashleigh are further delayed by Ashleigh getting increasingly involved with Pollard, who is having a creative crisis, and his long-suffering screenwriter, Ted Davidoff.

Feeling abandoned and without an itinerary, Gatsby accompanies Chan to her parents' apartment where he sings "Everything Happens to Me" on their piano. They discuss their love for New York and agree that on rainy days it is one of the most romantic places. They visit the Metropolitan Museum of Art, where Chan confesses that she used to have a crush on Gatsby. A chance encounter with his aunt and uncle at the museum forces Gatsby to attend his parents' gala later that evening.

Meanwhile, while searching for a vanished Pollard, Ashleigh and Ted stumble upon Ted's wife, who is having an extramarital affair. While Ted confronts his wife, Ashleigh goes to the studio where she meets film star Francisco Vega, who invites her out for dinner. Gatsby, meanwhile, uses his gambling skills to win big at a poker game his brother had arranged earlier in the evening. Back at his hotel room, he sees Ashleigh on the television news hailed as Francisco's latest fling. Distraught, he goes for a drink at the Carlyle Hotel's cocktail lounge, where he meets an escort named Terry, whom he hires to impersonate the absent Ashleigh at his family's gala.

Francisco takes Ashleigh to a film business party, where she reconnects with Pollard and Ted, who both declare themselves smitten with her. Afterwards, Francisco and Ashleigh retire to his apartment, and as they are about to have sex, Francisco's girlfriend arrives unexpectedly, driving Ashleigh to leave through the backdoor into the rain, wearing only a raincoat over her bra and panties.

Gatsby arrives at his family's gala with Terry, but his mother sees through the charade. In an intimate talk, she reveals to Gatsby that she was an escort when she met his father, and that her earnings were the seed capital that resulted in their wealth. Her personal history is the reason she has pressured Gatsby into intellectual and artistic endeavors, education, and refinement that she acquired as an adult. This revelation changes Gatsby's perceptions of his mother in a positive way. At the end of the night, Ashleigh finds a despondent Gatsby back at the Carlyle, assuring him that nothing happened with Francisco, despite her lack of clothing.

The next morning, before their planned return to Yardley, the pair take a horse-drawn carriage ride in Central Park. Ashleigh, however, is disappointed by the misty weather, and when Gatsby mentions a Cole Porter lyric, she misattributes it to Shakespeare. Realizing their incompatibility, Gatsby abruptly ends their relationship and announces that he will withdraw from Yardley to stay in New York. He later goes to the Delacorte Clock, outside the Central Park Zoo, reenacting a fantasy he and Chan previously shared. As the clock strikes six, Chan arrives, and the pair kiss in the pouring rain.

== Cast ==
- Timothée Chalamet as Gatsby Welles
- Elle Fanning as Ashleigh Enright
- Selena Gomez as Chan Tyrell
- Jude Law as Ted Davidoff
- Diego Luna as Francisco Vega
- Liev Schreiber as Roland Pollard
- Kelly Rohrbach as Terry
- Annaleigh Ashford as Lily
- Rebecca Hall as Connie Davidoff
- Cherry Jones as Mrs. Welles
- Will Rogers as Hunter Welles
- Suki Waterhouse as Tiffany
- Ben Warheit as Alvin Troller
- Griffin Newman as Josh Loomis
- Kathryn Leigh Scott as Wanda
- Don Stephenson as Bemelmans Bar waiter

== Production ==
In August 2017, Timothée Chalamet, Selena Gomez, and Elle Fanning joined the cast of Woody Allen's newest film, with Allen directing from a screenplay he wrote. Letty Aronson produced, while Amazon Studios was to distribute it. In September 2017, Jude Law, Diego Luna, Liev Schreiber, Annaleigh Ashford, Rebecca Hall, Cherry Jones, Will Rogers, and Kelly Rohrbach joined the cast. In October 2017, Suki Waterhouse joined the cast, and Allen confirmed the film was to be titled A Rainy Day in New York.

Principal photography began on September 11, 2017, in New York City and concluded on October 23.

== Music ==
The film features several songs by jazz pianist Erroll Garner.

== Release and box office ==
A Rainy Day in New York was first released in Poland on July 26, 2019, by Kino Świat. It was subsequently released in Lithuania, Greece, Netherlands, Turkey, Belgium, France, Slovakia, Israel, Italy, Spain, Portugal, Colombia, Mexico, Argentina, Germany, Brazil, South Korea, Russia, and Central and South America throughout the second half of 2019. It was released in the United Kingdom on June 5, 2020. It was released in the United States on October 9, 2020, by MPI Media Group and Signature Entertainment.

The film was the opening night premiere at the Deauville American Film Festival on September 6, 2019, before opening theatrically in France on September 18.

During the weekend of May 8–10, 2020, the film grossed over $330,000 in South Korea, becoming the highest-grossing film globally during that week. It had a disappointing opening weekend in the United States in October 2020, grossing $2,744 from six theaters, with an average of $457 per theater. The film was released in China in February 2022, becoming the first film by Allen to obtain a total theatrical release in the country. It has earned approximately $23.8 million worldwide.

=== Lawsuit ===
The film completed post-production in the third quarter of 2018. Amazon shelved the project as being effectively unmarketable, and later dropped the film; thus, 2018 marked the first time since 1981 that an entire calendar year had gone by without a new Woody Allen film. In February 2019, Allen filed a $68 million lawsuit contesting that Amazon had failed to meet contractual obligations to release the film as contracted, alleging the studio had dropped the film for only "vague reasons" and terminated the four-picture contract over "a 25-year-old, baseless allegation". The legal action was seeking minimum guarantee payments for the four films, plus damages and legal fees. In May 2019, it was reported that Amazon had given the U.S. distribution rights back to Allen. In November 2019, Allen settled his breach of contract lawsuit against Amazon, and both parties voluntarily filed a joint notice dismissing the case. The film eventually began streaming on Amazon Prime Video in June 2021.

=== Me Too movement responses ===
The film's production coincided with the start of the Me Too movement, causing a resurgence in public interest in the 1992 sexual abuse allegation against Allen. In October 2017, actor Griffin Newman announced via Twitter that he regretted acting in the film and would not work with Allen again in the future. Newman donated his salary to the Rape, Abuse & Incest National Network (RAINN). In January 2018, Chalamet donated his salary to the RAINN, Time's Up, and the Lesbian, Gay, Bisexual & Transgender Community Center of New York City. Gomez made a donation of over $1 million, exceeding her salary, to Time's Up. Like Gomez, Hall donated her salary to Time's Up. She later explained, "I've been deliberate in saying that the choice wasn't making a judgment one way or another. I don't believe anyone in the public should be judge and jury on a case that is so complex."

Without commenting on the allegations against Allen, Law said in November 2018 that it's "a terrible shame" the film got shelved. Cherry Jones, conversely, defended Allen in April 2019, saying: "[...] I went back and studied every scrap of information I could get about that period. And in my heart of hearts, I do not believe he was guilty as charged [...] [t]here are those who are comfortable with their certainty. I am not. I don't know the truth, but I know that if we condemn by instinct, democracy is on a slippery slope."

== Reception ==
The Hollywood Reporter and ScreenRant noted critics' negative reaction and praise for Chalamet's performance, and their belief that the film contains derivative ideas from Allen's previous films. On the review aggregator website Rotten Tomatoes, the film holds an approval rating of 47% based on 113 reviews, with an average rating of 5.4/10. The website's critics consensus reads, "Its outstanding cast helps elevate a middling screenplay, but A Rainy Day in New York falls well short of Woody Allen's best efforts." On Metacritic, the film has a weighted average score of 38 out of 100, based on 18 critics, indicating "generally unfavorable" reviews.

Variety's Jessica Kiang wrote: "Despite featuring some of the best actors of their respective generations, A Rainy Day in New York feels like a film born of profound creative exhaustion." Matt Thrift of Little White Lies was more positive, calling the film "hardly top-tier Allen" but had "such wonderful performances" from the cast. Lisa Nesselson for Screen Daily praised the "splendid performances" and Vittorio Storaro's brilliant cinematography, and noted that the film is "far more hit than miss". Jordan Mintzer of The Hollywood Reporter suggested that "A Rainy Day has its moments, most of them thanks to star Timothée Chalamet [...] who does a terrific job channeling your typical Allenian antihero," and "Fanning does her best with such a problematic character", but concluded that the film is merely Allen's watchable rehashed themes. Jade Budowski of Decider panned the film for its unlikable characters and its "painfully pretentious and on-the-nose" dialogue, ultimately advising readers to skip the film: "The allegations against Allen alone should be enough reason to avoid A Rainy Day in New York, but even without them, it is a barely watchable affair."
