= Cassandra's Dream =

2007 film by Woody Allen

- Theatrical release poster
- Directed by: Woody Allen
- Written by: Woody Allen
- Produced by: Letty Aronson; Stephen Tenenbaum; Gareth Wiley
- Starring: Hayley Atwell; Colin Farrell; Sally Hawkins; Ewan McGregor; Tom Wilkinson
- Cinematography: Vilmos Zsigmond
- Edited by: Alisa Lepselter
- Music by: Philip Glass
- Production companies: Iberville Productions; Virtual Studios; Wild Bunch
- Distributed by: The Weinstein Company (United States); Optimum Releasing (United Kingdom); TFM Distribution (France)
- Release dates: 18 June 2007 (Avilés premiere); 31 October 2007 (France); 18 January 2008 (United States); 23 May 2008 (United Kingdom)
- Running time: 108 minutes
- Countries: United States; France; United Kingdom
- Language: English
- Box office: $22.7 million

Cassandra's Dream is a 2007 crime thriller drama film written and directed by Woody Allen. It stars Hayley Atwell, Colin Farrell, Sally Hawkins, Ewan McGregor and Tom Wilkinson. Shot in England, the film is a co-production between the United States, France, and the United Kingdom.

The film premiered in secret in Avilés, Spain, on 18 June 2007. It officially premiered at the 64th Venice International Film Festival on 2 September 2007 and was already in theaters in Spain by 3 November. The film had its North American premiere at the Toronto International Film Festival on 11 September 2007. Cassandra's Dream was released theatrically in France on 31 October 2007, in the United States on 18 January 2008, and in the United Kingdom on 23 May 2008.

== Plot ==
Brothers Terry and Ian, who live in South London, were raised by their father, Brian, who runs a restaurant, and their mother, Dorothy, who taught her sons to look up to their uncle Howard, a successful plastic surgeon and businessman. He has opened clinics in Switzerland, the United States and, more recently, in China.

The brothers buy a sailboat at a low price, despite its near pristine condition. They name it Cassandra's Dream, after a greyhound that won Terry the money to buy the boat.

While driving home from a day's sailing in a borrowed car, Ian crosses paths with actress Angela Stark, with whom he becomes infatuated. After noticing her car has broken down, he stops to help her fix it. As a way to thank him, she gives Ian tickets to the play in which she is performing. After he attends the play, and despite Angela's already having a lover, she and Ian start dating.

Terry has a gambling addiction that sinks him deeper in debt. Ian wishes to invest in hotels in California to finance a new life with Angela. To overcome their financial problems, they decide to ask Howard for help. When Howard returns from a business trip to China, he agrees to help them, but asks for a favor in return: they must murder a man named Martin Burns. Howard faces imprisonment for unspecified crimes and his future is threatened by Burns, a former business partner who plans to testify against him. Howard asks his nephews to get rid of Burns, and in return he will reward them financially. After initial reluctance, the brothers agree.

In the ensuing days before the murder, while trying to come up with a plan, Ian fears Angela is sleeping with other people. He promises to give her a life in Hollywood if they treat their relationship as a serious, exclusive thing. To kill Martin, Ian and Terry eventually decide to make zip guns, untraceable and easily destroyed. Lying in wait in Burns' home, their plan is foiled when he arrives with a woman. Their resolve shaken, they leave and agree to commit the murder the next day.

The next day, after Martin visits his mother, Terry and Ian follow him and succeed in carrying out the murder. They later destroy the guns. Ian is content to move on as if nothing happened, but Terry is consumed by guilt and begins abusing alcohol and other drugs. His behavior frightens his fiancée, who tells Ian about the situation, saying that Terry believes he has killed someone. After Terry confides that he wants to turn himself in to the police, Ian goes to Howard for advice. They agree there is no alternative but to get rid of Terry. Ian plans to poison Terry during an outing on the boat. Unable to bring himself to kill his own brother, Ian attacks him in a fit of rage. In the chaos, Terry knocks Ian down the steps into the cabin, killing him.

The boat is later discovered adrift by the police, who deduce that Terry killed Ian and then drowned himself. Cassandra's Dream remains in beautiful condition despite everything that happened.

== Cast ==
- Colin Farrell as Terry Blaine
- Ewan McGregor as Ian Blaine
- John Benfield as Brian Blaine
- Clare Higgins as Dorothy Blaine
- Ashley Madekwe as Lucy
- Andrew Howard as Jerry
- Hayley Atwell as Angela Stark
- Sally Hawkins as Kate
- Tom Wilkinson as Howard Swann
- Phil Davis as Martin Burns
- Jim Carter as Fred
- Richard Lintern as Director
- Jennifer Higham as Helen
- Lee Whitlock as Mike
- Hugh Rathbone, Allan Ramsey, Paul Marc Davis, Terry Budin-Jones, Franck Viano, and Tommy Mack as poker players

== Soundtrack ==
This is the first Woody Allen film since Everything You Always Wanted to Know About Sex* (*But Were Afraid to Ask) to have an original score commissioned for it. The score was composed by Philip Glass.

It was also his first film released with a stereo soundtrack. Allen previously eschewed stereo, although often employing Dolby Stereo and Dolby Digital technologies to convey a higher quality mono soundtrack. The film is stereo for its music only.

== Critical response ==
The film received mixed reviews from critics. On the review aggregator website Rotten Tomatoes, the film holds an approval rating of 46% based on 117 reviews, with an average rating of 5.6/10. The website's critics consensus reads, "Colin Farrell and Tom Wilkinson act up a storm in Cassandra's Dream, but Woody Allen's heavy-handed symbolism and foreshadowing drains the plot of all tension." Metacritic, which uses a weighted average, assigned the film a score of 49 out of 100, based on 31 critics, indicating "mixed or average" reviews.

Manohla Dargis commended the film in her review for The New York Times. Although offering criticism such as the film feeling "too lightly polished and often rushed, as if he had directed it with a stopwatch," she suggests that Allen's film "is good enough that you may wonder why he doesn't just stop making comedies once and for all." Roger Ebert compared the film negatively to Sidney Lumet's similarly themed Before the Devil Knows You're Dead, adding: "The Lumet film uses actors who don't look like brothers but feel like brothers. Allen's actors look like brothers but don't really feel related." He rated the film two out of four stars, and noted that Allen's previous film Match Point presented the material more effectively.

Damon Wise of Empire magazine concluded that Cassandra's Dream was "[a] clumsy, clichéd morality play that may actually represent the lowest point of Allen's recently chequered career." Paul Jordan also compared the film to a morality play—but considered that praise: "Allen gets past the guard of a modern audience which would not have taken seriously the appearance of a Mephistopheles or an Old Scratch. Uncle Howard is a chilling 21st Century Tempter, fulfilling the heart's desire in return for murder and leading his nephews to terrible perdition."

In his "Best of the Decade" article, New Yorker critic Richard Brody called Cassandra's Dream one of the best films of the 2000s: "Few aging directors so cogently and relentlessly depict the grimly destructive machinery of life, and every time the word 'family' is uttered, the screws tighten just a little more."

In 2016, film critics Robbie Collin and Tim Robey ranked Cassandra's Dream as one of the worst films by Allen.
