= Whatever Works =

2009 film by Woody Allen

- Theatrical release poster
- Directed by: Woody Allen
- Written by: Woody Allen
- Produced by: Letty Aronson; Stephen Tenenbaum
- Starring: Ed Begley Jr.; Patricia Clarkson; Larry David; Conleth Hill; Michael McKean; Evan Rachel Wood
- Cinematography: Harris Savides
- Edited by: Alisa Lepselter
- Production companies: Perdido Productions; Gravier Productions; Wild Bunch
- Distributed by: Sony Pictures Classics
- Release dates: April 22, 2009 (Tribeca); June 19, 2009 (United States)
- Running time: 92 minutes
- Country: United States
- Language: English
- Budget: $15 million
- Box office: $35 million

Whatever Works is a 2009 American comedy film directed and written by Woody Allen and starring Larry David, Evan Rachel Wood, Patricia Clarkson, Ed Begley Jr., Michael McKean, and Henry Cavill. The film was released on June 19, 2009, to mixed critical reviews, but grossed $35 million.

== Plot ==
Boris Yelnikoff is a cynical, misanthropic chess teacher and former Columbia quantum mechanics professor. Divorced, he avoids most people, and except for three friends and his students, is patronizing to anyone he meets who does not match him intellectually.

Boris comes home one night to find Melody, a simpleminded 21-year-old, on his doorstep. He reluctantly helps her, and learns that she has run away from her fundamentalist parents in Mississippi. She asks if she can stay the night, which Boris eventually allows. While staying with Boris, Melody develops a crush on him, despite their age difference, varying cultures and intelligence. Boris later falls in love with her, and they marry.

A year later, Melody's mother, Marietta, finds Melody, explaining that she and her husband, John, thought Melody had been kidnapped. She goes on to tell her that John left her and sold their house after John lost money in the stock market. She meets Boris and is disappointed with him, so she tries to persuade Melody to end the marriage. The three go for lunch and meet Boris's friend, Leo. When Marietta goes to use the restroom, a young man, Randy Lee James, inquires about Melody and Marietta slyly decides to recruit Randy, who has fallen in love with Melody at first sight, to end her marriage. Later that evening, Leo, who had taken an interest in Marietta, asks her over for dinner. They spend the evening together, and discover that she is a talented photographer.

Boris explains to the audience that over the next few weeks Marietta has changed and started experimenting with artistic photography, exotic new habits, and starting an open relationship with Leo and his business partner, Morgenstern. Marietta still hates Boris and keeps trying to get Melody to marry Randy. She takes Melody to an outdoor market and "accidentally" runs into Randy, who questions her about her marriage. Melody sees past Marietta's attempt and tells him that her marriage is fine. She warns her mother to stop, but Marietta continues to try. Later, while shopping for clothes, Melody meets Randy in yet another planned encounter and he gets her to admit that her relationship with Boris is not entirely satisfying. He then invites her to the boat he lives on, and the two kiss and begin an affair.

John arrives at Boris and Melody's home remorseful and hopes to get the family back together. They all go to Marietta's photography exhibit opening together, and he sees how his ex-wife has changed since she moved to New York. Distraught, he retreats to a bar, drinking away his misery. While there, he meets a recently divorced gay man, Howard, and admits what he has known most of his adult life: that he is also gay.

Melody finally tells Boris she is in love with Randy. Boris is devastated, and jumps out the window. He lands on another woman, Helena, breaking her arm and leg. When he visits her in the hospital, Boris asks her if there is anything he can do to make it up to her, Helena says she would like to go to dinner with him.

Finally, Boris hosts a New Year's Eve party, where everyone is in their new relationships: Marietta with Leo and Morgenstern, John with Howard, Melody with Randy, and finally Boris with Helena. Melody and her parents have completely shed their former Southern conservative mindsets and wholeheartedly adopted the liberal New York City way of life and values. Everyone is now the best of friends, and at midnight they kiss their significant others.

Afterward, Boris breaks the fourth wall to tell the audience that one has to find all the enjoyment one can to find, "Whatever Works".

== Cast ==
- Larry David as Boris
- Evan Rachel Wood as Melody
- Ed Begley Jr. as John
- Patricia Clarkson as Marietta
- Conleth Hill as Brockman
- Michael McKean as Leo
- Henry Cavill as Randy Lee James
- John Gallagher Jr. as Perry
- Jessica Hecht as Helena
- Carolyn McCormick as Jessica
- Christopher Evan Welch as Howard
- Olek Krupa as Morgenstern

In addition, Adam Brooks and Lyle Kanouse portray Boris' two other unnamed friends.

== Production ==
The film was shot in New York City, marking Allen's return to his native city after shooting four films in Europe. David was hesitant to take the role, pointing out to Allen that his work on Curb Your Enthusiasm was improvisation, but Allen encouraged him to take the role anyway.

Partly to counter assertions that the film is autobiographical, Allen has pointed out that the script was written in the early 1970s, with Zero Mostel in mind for Boris; it was shelved after the actor's death in 1977. Thirty years later, Allen revisited the script in an attempt to create a film before a potential threat of a Screen Actors Guild strike. According to Allen, the only significant changes to the script involved updating the topical references.

== Soundtrack ==
- "Hello, I Must Be Going" – Groucho Marx and Cast
- "Salty Bubble" – Tom Sharpsteen and His Orlandos
- "Butterfly By" – Heinz Kiessling
- "Honeymoon Swoon" – Werner Tautz
- "If I Could Be With You (One Hour Tonight)" – Jackie Gleason
- Symphony No. 9 (Beethoven) in D Minor, Op. 125 – Royal Philharmonic Orchestra
- Wedding March – Royal Philharmonic Orchestra
- Symphony No. 5 (Beethoven) in C Minor – Royal Philharmonic Orchestra
- "Desafinado" – Stan Getz and Charlie Byrd
- "Spring Will Be A Little Late This Year" – Red Garland
- "Menina Flor" – Charlie Byrd
- Auld Lang Syne – Dick Hyman & His Orchestra
- "Happy Birthday To You" – Larry David

== Release ==
On February 2, 2009, Variety reported that Sony Pictures Classics had purchased U.S. distribution rights to Whatever Works. It premiered at the Tribeca Film Festival in New York City, on April 22, 2009. Sony gave the film a limited US release, beginning June 19, 2009. Maple Pictures released the film in Canada theatrically, and on DVD in October 2009. The film had its UK release on June 25, 2010.

== Reception ==
On Rotten Tomatoes the film holds an approval rating of 50% based on 167 reviews, with an average rating of 5.4/10. The website's critical consensus reads, "Based upon a script written in the 1970s, Woody Allen's Whatever Works suffers from a lack of fresh ideas." According to another review aggregator, Metacritic, which assigns a normalized rating out of 100 top reviews from mainstream critics, the film has an average score of 45 out of 100, based on 30 critics, indicating "mixed or average reviews".

Reflecting the evenly split approval of the critics, Matthew Oshinsky of The Star-Ledger wrote that the film was a good example of Allen's "ability to write great roles for women" and the film is nowhere near his best work, but it has some funny lines and that "it's at least pleasant".

== See also ==
- List of films set around New Year
