= Mary Hegarty =

Irish opera singer - soprano

- Born: Ireland
- Genres: Opera, classical, jazz, musical theatre
- Occupations: Soprano, University Lecturer
- Website: maryhegarty.ie

Mary Hegarty is an Irish opera singer soprano.

Born in Fermoy, County Cork, she studied singing at the Cork School of Music with Maeve Coughlan, representing Ireland at the Cardiff Singer of the World festival in 1985. She went on to study at the National Opera Studio in London and gave her Covent Garden debut in 1988. She also sang regularly at Opera North, English National Opera, Glyndebourne and other theatres and festivals across Britain and Ireland. She is also known for film projects such as Match Point and Jonathan Dove's television opera Buzz on the Moon. Mary lectures in Vocal Studies at the Munster Technological University and is active as a recitalist and concert performer.
