= Alisa Lepselter =

American film editor (born 1963)

- Born: 1963 (age 62–63)
- Occupation: Film editor

Alisa Lepselter (born 1963) is an American film editor who has edited director Woody Allen's films since 1999.

== Life and career ==
Lepselter received a bachelor's degree from Duke University in 1985 with a major in art history. Lepselter began her editing career as an intern with editor Craig McKay on Something Wild (directed by Jonathan Demme-1986). She was an apprentice with editor Barry Malkin on Francis Ford Coppola's segment of New York Stories (1989). She was Thelma Schoonmaker's assistant editor on Martin Scorsese's adaptation of The Age of Innocence (1993), and was Robert M. Reitano's assistant on three films associated with Nora Ephron (My Blue Heaven (1990), This is My Life (1992), and Mixed Nuts (1994)).

Lepselter's first editing credit was for Nicole Holofcener's Walking and Talking (1996), which was also Holofcener's first film as a director. Since Sweet and Lowdown (1999), she has edited all of Woody Allen's films; she succeeded Susan E. Morse, who edited Allen's films for the previous 20 years.

Lepselter was nominated for an American Cinema Editors "Eddie" Award for Vicky Cristina Barcelona (2008) and again for Midnight in Paris (2011).

== Filmography as editor ==
- Something Wild (1986) (apprentice editor)
- Light of Day (1987) (apprentice sound editor)
- A Gathering of Old Men (1987) (TV movie) (apprentice editor)
- New York Stories (1989) ("Life Without Zoë" segment's apprentice film editor)
- Staying Together (1989) (assistant editor)
- An Innocent Man (1989) (apprentice editor)
- My Blue Heaven (1990) (assistant editor)
- This Is My Life (1992) (first assistant editor)
- The Age of Innocence (1993) (first assistant film editor)
- Mixed Nuts (1994) (first assistant editor)
- Closer to Home (1995) (main title sequence's editor) (uncredited)
- Walking and Talking (1996)
- Sweet and Lowdown (1999)
- Small Time Crooks (2000)
- The Curse of the Jade Scorpion (2001)
- Hollywood Ending (2002)
- Anything Else (2003)
- Melinda and Melinda (2004)
- Match Point (2005)
- Scoop (2006)
- Cassandra's Dream (2007)
- Vicky Cristina Barcelona (2008)
- Whatever Works (2009)
- You Will Meet a Tall Dark Stranger (2010)
- Midnight in Paris (2011)
- To Rome with Love (2012)
- Blue Jasmine (2013)
- Magic in the Moonlight (2014)
- Irrational Man (2015)
- Café Society (2016)
- Crisis in Six Scenes (2016)
- Wonder Wheel (2017)
- A Rainy Day in New York (2019)
- Rifkin's Festival (2020)
- You Hurt My Feelings (2023)
- Coup de chance (2023)

== See also ==
- List of film director and editor collaborations
