= Letty Aronson =

American film producer

- Born: Ellen Letty Konigsberg; November 30, 1943 (age 82); New York City, U.S.
- Education: Brooklyn College, New York University
- Occupation: Film producer
- Years active: 1994–present
- Known for: Producing Academy Award-nominated films
- Spouse: Sidney Aronson (m. 1968; died 2002)
- Children: 3
- Family: Woody Allen (brother); Ronan Farrow (nephew)
- Awards: Golden Globe Award (2009)

Ellen Letty Aronson (née Konigsberg; born November 30, 1943) is an American film producer. She is the younger sister of writer and director Woody Allen.

== Personal life ==
Aronson was born Ellen Letty Konigsberg in 1943 in New York City, to Nettie (née Cherry) and Martin Königsberg, and was raised in Midwood, Brooklyn, New York. Her older brother is writer and director Woody Allen. Aronson comes from a Jewish family; her grandparents were from Austria and Russia. She was educated at Brooklyn College and New York University. Aronson was married to Sidney Aronson, an elementary school principal in Brooklyn who died in 2002. They had three children together, Christopher, Erika, and Alexa.

== Career ==
She has produced many of her brother Woody Allen's films including Bullets over Broadway (1994), Mighty Aphrodite (1995), Deconstructing Harry (1997), Celebrity (1998), The Curse of the Jade Scorpion (2001), Anything Else (2003), Melinda and Melinda (2004), Match Point (2005), Scoop (2006), Cassandra's Dream (2007), Vicky Cristina Barcelona (2008), Whatever Works (2009), You Will Meet a Tall Dark Stranger (2010), Midnight in Paris (2011), To Rome with Love (2012), and Blue Jasmine (2013).

== Filmography ==
=== As a producer ===
Year	Title	Notes
1994	Bullets over Broadway	
1994	Don't Drink the Water	Television movie
1995	Mighty Aphrodite	
1996	Everyone Says I Love You	
1997	Deconstructing Harry	
1997	The Spanish Prisoner	Co-executive producer
1998	Into My Heart	Executive producer
1998	Celebrity	
1999	Sweet and Lowdown	
1999	Story of a Bad Boy	Co-executive producer
1999	Women Talking Dirty |	Co-executive producer
1999	Just Looking |	Co-executive producer
2000	Small Time Crooks	
2001	The Curse of the Jade Scorpion	
2002	Hollywood Ending	
2003	Anything Else	
2004	Melinda and Melinda	
2005	Match Point	
2006	Scoop	
2007	Cassandra's Dream	
2008	Vicky Cristina Barcelona	
2009	Whatever Works	
2010	You Will Meet a Tall Dark Stranger	
2011	Midnight in Paris	
2012	To Rome with Love	
2013	Blue Jasmine	
2014	Magic in the Moonlight	
2015	Irrational Man	
2016	Café Society	
2017	Wonder Wheel	
2019	A Rainy Day in New York	
2020	Rifkin's Festival	
2023	Coup de chance	

== Awards and nominations ==
Year	Award	Category	Nominated work	Result
2008	Golden Globe Awards	Best Picture - Musical or Comedy	Vicky Cristina Barcelona	Won
2012	Academy Awards	Best Picture	Midnight in Paris	Nominated
2012	Alliance of Women Film Journalists	Best Picture	Midnight in Paris	Nominated
2012	Hollywood Film Awards	Producer of the Year	Midnight in Paris	Won
2012	Producers Guild of America Awards	Best Theatrical Motion Picture	Midnight in Paris	Nominated
2014	Producers Guild of America Awards	Best Theatrical Motion Picture	Blue Jasmine	Nominated
