= Scoop (2006 film) =

Crime comedy film by Woody Allen

- Theatrical release poster
- Directed by: Woody Allen
- Written by: Woody Allen
- Produced by: Letty Aronson; Gareth Wiley
- Starring: Woody Allen; Hugh Jackman; Scarlett Johansson; Ian McShane
- Cinematography: Remi Adefarasin
- Edited by: Alisa Lepselter
- Production companies: Focus Features; BBC Films; Ingenious Film Partners; Phoenix Wiley; Jelly Roll Productions
- Distributed by: Focus Features (Select territories); BBC Films (United Kingdom)
- Release date: 28 July 2006 (United States)
- Running time: 96 minutes
- Countries: United Kingdom; United States
- Language: English
- Budget: US$4 million
- Box office: US$39 million

Scoop is a 2006 romantic crime comedy film written and directed by Woody Allen and starring Hugh Jackman, Scarlett Johansson, Ian McShane and Allen himself. It was released in the United States by Focus Features on July 28, 2006. The film follows an American journalist and a magician being guided by the spirit of a reporter to investigate a British aristocrat who might be a serial killer. Scoop received mixed reviews from critics regarding its humor, but was a box-office success, grossing $39 million against a $4 million budget.

== Plot ==
Following the memorial service for investigative reporter Joe Strombel, his spirit finds himself on the barge of death with several others, including Jane Cook, a woman who believes she was poisoned by her employer, Peter Lyman. Jane thinks Lyman, a British aristocrat with political ambitions, may be the Tarot Card Killer, a notorious serial killer of prostitutes, and he killed her when she stumbled onto his secret. The Killer leaves a card on each murder victim's body.

Sondra Pransky is an American journalism student on vacation in London. Pransky attends a performance given by magician Sid Waterman, aka "The Great Splendini", and agrees to participate onstage. While in a booth known as The Dematerializer, Pransky encounters Strombel's ghost. The ghost escaped the Grim Reaper to impart his suspicions of Lyman to a journalist who can investigate the story. (Note: The scene was influenced by one from Federico Fellini's Nights of Cabiria, in which a stage musician about to be exposed as a fraud performs actual magic.) Sondra decides to find out if Lyman truly is the Killer, enlisting Sid in the process.

Sondra catches Lyman's attention by pretending to drown at an exclusive club's swimming pool. When he rescues her, she introduces herself as Jade Spence, daughter of a wealthy family from Palm Beach. While Sid poses as her father, "Jade" dates Lyman. Sondra is convinced Lyman is the murderer, but Sid finds it hard to believe. Sondra falls in love with Lyman and begins to trust him. Sid meanwhile becomes less sanguine about Lyman as he notices more and more inconsistencies, especially after Sondra finds a Tarot deck hidden under a horn in Peter's vault, a music room containing antique musical instruments. Sid prevails upon Sondra to write a news story implicating Lyman, which the editor rejects because of her lack of proof.

Soon the police arrest the real Tarot Card Killer. Sondra, relieved that her suspicions were for naught, reveals her real name and the deception she and Sid had practiced. Lyman is gracious and tells Sondra he wants to keep seeing her. They plan to spend the weekend at Lyman's isolated country estate. Later, Sid (at Strombel's urging) suggests that Lyman used the Tarot Card murders to cover up a killing he committed.

While Sondra and Lyman vacation in the country, Sid continues to investigate this theory. He finds that Lyman did frequent a prostitute, Betty Gibson, who was later murdered, apparently by the Killer. Gibson is described as a "baby-faced blonde" (just like Sondra) before Lyman convinced her to dye her hair, presumably to match the profile of the other Tarot victims. When Sid calls Sondra with his findings, she waves them off. Unbeknownst to her, Lyman is listening in on another extension.

Sid breaks into Lyman's vault again, this time finding a key, which turns out to be to Betty Gibson's flat. Meanwhile, in a rowboat on Lyman's lake, Lyman confesses to Sondra that he killed Gibson to stop her from blackmailing him and used the Tarot Card pattern to allay suspicion, just as Strombel said. Meanwhile, Sid drives to the Lyman estate to rescue Sondra but ultimately dies in a car crash.

After confessing, Lyman throws Sondra into the lake and watches her go under. He later calls the police to report her drowning death. When they question him, he tells them Sondra was a terrible swimmer and almost drowned that first day at the pool. Sondra then enters, soaking wet but alive. She informs Lyman and the police that the drowning had been an act to get his attention, and actually she is a good swimmer.

Back in the newspaper offices, the editor who rejected Sondra's article now congratulates her on the start of a promising career. Sondra seems flattered, and says she must also credit Joe Strombel and the late Sid Waterman, who is now a passenger on the Reaper's ship, performing for his fellow spirits the same magical gags and comedy routines he did in life.

== Cast ==
- Woody Allen as Sid Waterman/The Great Splendini/Mr. Spence
- Scarlett Johansson as Sondra Pransky/Jade Spence
- Hugh Jackman as Peter Lyman
- Ian McShane as Joe Strombel
- Charles Dance as Mr. Malcolm
- Romola Garai as Vivian
- Kevin R. McNally as Mike Tinsley
- Jim Dunk as Funeral Speaker
- Robert Bathurst as Strombel's Co-worker
- Geoff Bell as Strombel's Co-worker
- Christopher Fulford as Strombel's Co-worker
- Nigel Lindsay as Strombel's Co-worker
- Fenella Woolgar as Jane Cook
- Peter Mastin as Death
- Doreen Mantle as Joe's Co-Passenger
- David Schneider as Joe's Co-Passenger
- Meera Syal as Joe's Co-Passenger
- Caroline Blakiston as Vivian's Mother, Miss Quincy
- Mark Heap as M.C.
- Julian Glover as Lord Lyman
- Sanjeev Bhaskar as Poker Player
- Lynda Baron as Tenant
- Phil Cornwell as Tenant
- Victoria Hamilton as Jan
- Alexander Armstrong as Cop
- Anthony Head as Detective
- Julia Deakin as Sid's Co-Passenger
- Toby Jones as Joe's Co-Passenger (uncredited)

== Production ==
The lead character (originally an adult journalist) was tailored specifically to Johansson, whom Allen observed as having an unutilized "funny" quality about her while working on his previous film, Match Point.

Although it was filmed in London, the film is the second of Allen's films (the other being Hollywood Ending) not to have a UK theatrical release. It was given a British TV premiere on February 7, 2009 on BBC Two. The film eventually came out on DVD in the UK on February 9, 2015 through Icon Film Distribution.

As is often the case with Allen's films, there is no original score. Most of the music heard in the film is by Pyotr Ilyich Tchaikovsky, Johann Strauss Jr., and Edvard Grieg.

Together with The Illusionist and The Prestige (which also starred Johansson and Jackman), Scoop was one of three films in 2006 to explore the world of stage magicians.

== Critical reception ==
Scoop received mixed reviews from critics. On the review aggregator Rotten Tomatoes, the film has a 41% approval rating based on 148 reviews, with an average score of 5.4/10. The website's critical consensus states: "Rehashing old plot lines and characters, Scoop is a tiresome dipper and another disappointing addition to Woody Allen's repertoire." Metacritic reported the film has an average score of 48 out of 100, based on 35 reviews, indicating "mixed or average reviews".

Stephen Hunter of The Washington Post called it the "worst movie Woody Allen has ever made":

Basically the movie decodes into a Hardy Boys-level mystery. It's not, of course, that comedies must display documentary realism on this sort of thing. You forgive anything in a movie if it's funny. Scoop is never funny enough — except for the odd, whiny Allen gibe, mainly because it recalls better days — to achieve this dispensation; the lack of realism becomes a crippling attribute. This gives nobody, least of all me, any pleasure, but a truth must be faced: Scoop is the worst movie Woody Allen has ever made.

At the other extreme, Mick LaSalle of the San Francisco Chronicle, who also gave positive reviews to Allen's Melinda and Melinda, called it "the funniest movie of the year so far" and Allen's funniest film in a decade. He also said:

Scoop has something Match Point didn't, something that none of Allen's films have had to quite this degree in 10 years. It's really, really funny. Not funny "heh-heh", but laugh-out-loud funny. Funny like you walk out wanting to tell your friends its best lines. Funny like you're walking down the street and remember a moment and start laughing like an idiot. Woody Allen has written himself an ideal role, creating a character and a situation that result in a continuous stream of winning bits. And he's paired himself with a partner in Scarlett Johansson who brings deftness and freshness to Allen's familiar comic universe.

Manohla Dargis of The New York Times called it "not especially funny yet oddly appealing":

Mr. Allen doesn't seem to be working terribly hard in Scoop, and while that makes for some apparent goofs and lots of ragged edges, it gives the whole thing a pleasantly carefree vibe. After the first 20 or so clunky minutes, the film settles into a groove and then, ever so slightly, deepens. Mr. Allen's invocation of the Thin Man films in an interview makes sense, even if he's no William Powell and Ms. Johansson is certainly no Myrna Loy. Scoop was made by someone who understands that what makes the "Thin Man" series enduring isn't whodunit and why, but the way Nick and Nora look at each other as they sip their martinis, Asta nipping at their heels.

Ty Burr of The Boston Globe called it "fluffy, fatally implausible farce":

You can assume this kind of humor goes over well with the Europeans who are the director's financial backers and primary audience these days. Like Charlie Chaplin in his final years, Allen has found refuge in exile, far from the US audiences who have turned their backs on him (because we're lowbrow slobs or because his films have stopped being very good; your call). When we see him onstage as The Great Splendini, Allen even eerily resembles Chaplin in Limelight, shyly smiling out at the audience with the comedian's eternal hope of unconditional love. Does he see anything besides the beautiful young woman and himself? Sweet and woebegone, Scoop says no.

The film was ranked as Allen's worst in a 2016 poll of Time Out contributors, with editor Dave Calhoun writing, "It's not radical to call it his low point." The same year, film critics Robbie Collin and Tim Robey ranked the film as one of Allen's weakest.

== Box office ==
Scoop opened in 538 American theatres on July 28, 2006. In its first three days, it grossed $3,046,924 for a per-theatre-average of $5,663. Box Office Mojo listed its opening as the biggest limited release premiere of 2006. By the time the film's domestic run had ended on September 28, 2006, it grossed $10,525,717 in the U.S. and $39,212,510 worldwide. The film had a $4 million budget, not including prints and advertising expense.
