= Paul Jordan (artist) =

Paul Jordan (November 24, 1916 – November 7, 2006) was an American Lyrical expressionist painter, journalist and memoirist.

== Biography ==
Jordan was born on November 24, 1916, in Kraków, Austria-Hungary. He lived in Lviv until the start of World War II when he migrated to England where he attended the London School of Economics (LSE) and St Martin's School of Art. He covered the war for the Associated Press and UPI.

His paintings were displayed at galleries in London, Paris and Carnegie Hall. He opposed Abstract Expressionism and "pop art". His wife, Christine Neubert, was a choreographer at the Children's Ballet Theater in NYC. She survives him.

At the time of his death, at age 89, he was writing a "memoir evoking three different worlds: semi-feudal Poland to semi socialist Britain and semi-"Anything Goes USA" (as per The New York Times obituary, December 6, 2006).
