= Gareth Wiley =

Gareth Wiley (born 3 March 1962, England) is a film producer, whose professional life started in the world of investment banking, working with County NatWest, Salomon Brothers, and UBS Warburg, moving into film producing in 2002.

Since 2004, he has produced or acted as executive producer on seven feature films, four of which have been with Woody Allen, having persuaded Allen to move his 2004 movie to London. In January 2009, Wiley won a Best Picture Golden Globe for Allen's Vicky Cristina Barcelona. This was Gareth's second Golden Globe nomination in four years, having been previously nominated in 2006 for his first collaboration with Allen, Match Point.

Wiley studied business with economics and law, before starting his working life as a banker in February 1985. Involvement in film finance and production began as early as 1993. Prior to working with Woody Allen, he maintained a career in investment banking (working in London, Hong Kong and the United States) in parallel with an increasing involvement in film finance and in 2002 committed himself to working exclusively in film and other creative businesses.

== Film credits ==
- Magic Trip (2011) directed by Alex Gibney and Alison Ellwood and featuring Ken Kesey and Neal Cassidy
- Tracker (2010) directed by Ian Sharp and featuring Ray Winstone and Temuera Morrison
- Vicky Cristina Barcelona (2008), directed by Woody Allen and featuring Penélope Cruz, Scarlett Johansson, and Javier Bardem
- Cassandra's Dream (2007) directed by Woody Allen and featuring Ewan McGregor and Colin Farrell
- Scoop (2006), directed by Woody Allen and featuring Scarlett Johansson and Hugh Jackman
- Match Point (2005), directed by Woody Allen and featuring Scarlett Johansson and Jonathan Rhys-Myers
- Till Human Voices Wake Us (2002), directed by Michael Petroni and featuring Helena Bonham-Carter and Guy Pearce
- Muggers (2000) directed by Dean Murphy and featuring Jason Barry and Matt Day
- Green Monkey (1998) short film directed by Rob Sprackling and featuring Steven Elliot and John R. Smith
- Funny Man (1994) directed by Simon Sprackling and featuring Christopher Lee and Ingrid Lacey

== Awards ==
- In 2006, he was nominated for a "Picture Producer - Drama" Golden Globe for Match Point.
- In 2009, he won for a "Picture Producer - Musical or Comedy" Golden Globe for Vicky Cristina Barcelona.
