= The Curse of the Jade Scorpion =

2001 film by Woody Allen

- Theatrical release poster
- Directed by: Woody Allen
- Written by: Woody Allen
- Produced by: Letty Aronson
- Starring: Woody Allen; Dan Aykroyd; Helen Hunt; Brian Markinson; Wallace Shawn; David Ogden Stiers; Charlize Theron
- Cinematography: Zhao Fei
- Edited by: Alisa Lepselter
- Music by: Dick Hyman
- Production companies: Gravier Productions; VCL
- Distributed by: DreamWorks Pictures (United States, Canada and South Korea); VCL; OTTFilm; United International Pictures (Germany); Capitol Films (international)
- Release dates: August 10, 2001 (United States); December 6, 2001 (Germany)
- Running time: 103 minutes
- Countries: United States; Germany
- Language: English
- Budget: $33 million
- Box office: $18.9 million

The Curse of the Jade Scorpion is a 2001 crime comedy film written and directed by and starring Woody Allen. The cast also features Dan Aykroyd, Helen Hunt, Brian Markinson, Wallace Shawn, David Ogden Stiers, and Charlize Theron. The plot concerns an insurance investigator (Allen) and an efficiency expert (Hunt) who are both hypnotized by a crooked hypnotist (Stiers) into stealing jewels.

The Curse of the Jade Scorpion received mixed reviews from critics and grossed $18.9 million worldwide against a production budget of $33 million, becoming a commercial failure.

== Plot ==
In 1940, C.W. Briggs is a veteran investigator at a Manhattan insurance company with a highly successful track record, owing to his intuition and network of informers. Efficiency expert Betty Ann Fitzgerald, who has been recently hired to modernize the company, often clashes with C.W. over his antiquated crime-solving methods. Betty Ann is having a secret affair with their boss, Chris Magruder, who assures her that he will divorce his wife to be with her.

During a company party at the Rainbow Room, magician Voltan brings C.W. and Betty Ann on stage and hypnotizes them into thinking they are in love with each other, using a swinging jade scorpion pendant and the trigger words "Constantinople" for C.W. and "Madagascar" for Betty Ann. Returning home later that night, C.W. receives a call from Voltan, who says "Constantinople" to rehypnotize him into stealing jewels from the Kensington mansion. The next morning, C.W. does not remember committing these crimes. While investigating, C.W. meets the Kensingtons' daughter, Laura, who later attempts to seduce him at his apartment before Voltan calls him and hypnotizes him into robbing another mansion.

Having noticed Betty Ann's suspicious behavior at work, C.W. sneaks into her apartment, where he overhears Chris telling her that he will no longer divorce his wife. After Chris leaves, a distraught Betty Ann gets drunk and C.W. stops her from jumping out of a window. As evidence begins to mount against C.W., he protests his innocence. Voltan calls C.W. and hypnotizes him into placing the jewels in a locker at Grand Central Terminal, leading to his arrest. With Laura's help, he escapes to Betty Ann's apartment, where she grudgingly hides him. That night, Voltan calls Betty Ann, saying "Madagascar" to hypnotize her into stealing jewels from a mansion. In her hypnotic state, she seduces C.W. but awakens the next morning with no memory of the previous night's events. Upon hearing news of the latest robbery, Betty Ann immediately suspects C.W. and throws him out.

C.W. and his co-workers George Bond and Alvin "Al" soon realize that Voltan's hypnosis act is the cause of the robberies. George, an amateur magician, frees C.W. of the trigger word and restores his memories. C.W. returns to Betty Ann's apartment to find her missing. Realizing Betty Ann must have been hypnotized again, he goes to the location in Chinatown where she is delivering the jewels to Voltan. Voltan tries to escape but is caught by the police. The still-hypnotized Betty Ann expresses her love for C.W., who kisses her before erasing her memories of the event.

Back at work, C.W. learns that Betty Ann and Chris are going on a romantic getaway and announces his resignation. He also finds that Chris intends to force Betty Ann to retire once they get married, as he does not want his wife to be working with him. Disturbed, C.W. heads to Betty Ann's office to inform her of his resignation and say goodbye. The two have a parting drink. Outside, the rest of the staff hail C.W. as a hero, though he dismisses his success as luck. George then reveals that a hypnotized person would not do anything that they would not do when in a normal state. Al gets C.W. to admit that he loves Betty Ann.

At Al's urging, C.W. goes after Betty Ann, who is about to leave for Paris with Chris. C.W. proposes to Betty Ann and confesses his love for her, but she rebuffs him. As Betty Ann and Chris are about to depart, a desperate C.W. says "Madagascar". Betty Ann, who is now in an amorous state, tells Chris that she is staying and announces that she will marry C.W., confessing to C.W. that she fell in love with him the moment they met. Chris runs to stop his divorce while Al gifts C.W. the jade scorpion. As C.W. and Betty Ann are leaving, George reveals to his co-workers that he had deprogrammed Betty Ann the night before. C.W. eventually realizes that Betty Ann is not hypnotized and is going with him willingly.

== Cast ==
- Woody Allen as C.W. Briggs
- Dan Aykroyd as Chris Magruder
- Helen Hunt as Betty Ann Fitzgerald
- Brian Markinson as Alvin "Al"
- Wallace Shawn as George Bond
- David Ogden Stiers as Voltan
- Charlize Theron as Laura Kensington
- Elizabeth Berkley as Jill
- Peter Gerety as Ned
- John Schuck as Mize
- Kaili Vernoff as Rosie
- Kevin Cahoon as a lunch delivery man

== Release ==
The Curse of the Jade Scorpion grossed $7.5 million in the United States and Canada, and $11.4 million in other territories, for a worldwide total of $18.9 million, against a production budget of $33 million. In the United States and Canada, the film debuted at number 11 on its opening weekend, grossing $2.4 million from 903 theaters. It was released on August 10, 2001, making it one of the last films set in Manhattan to be released before the September 11 terrorist attacks. Allen was promoting the film around the time of the attacks, and was in New York on September 11. Allen later said he was "terribly shocked but not really surprised" by the attacks, and added in an October 2001 interview that "New York will survive".

=== Reception ===
The film received mixed reviews from critics. On the review aggregator website Rotten Tomatoes, the film holds an approval rating of 45% based on 123 reviews, with an average rating of 5.2/10. The website's critics consensus reads, "The writing for Scorpion is not as sharp as Woody Allen's previous movies as most of the jokes fall flat." Metacritic, which uses a weighted average, assigned the film a score of 52 out of 100, based on 31 critics, indicating "mixed or average" reviews.

Allen himself remarked that it is perhaps his worst movie. Allen has said he felt he let down the rest of the cast by casting himself as the lead. He explained that part of the problem was the period setting and the set building expense which made it too expensive to go back and re-shoot anything. Allen re-shot the entirety of his 1987 drama September after he felt he got the casting wrong. Allen remarked he offered the role of C.W. Briggs to both Jack Nicholson and Tom Hanks, but had to take it when both refused.

Roger Ebert remarked that The Curse of the Jade Scorpion has all the basic elements for an outstanding screwball comedy, but that the jokes and storyline are uninspired and fall flat, and consequently the film never takes off. However, he highly praised the visual style, likening it to a vintage film noir shot in color. He gave it 2 1/2 out of 4 stars.

=== Home media ===
In 2002, the film was released on DVD and VHS by DreamWorks Home Entertainment. In February 2006, Viacom (now known as Paramount Skydance) acquired the rights to all live-action films DreamWorks had released since 1997, following their billion dollar acquisition of the company's live-action assets. The Curse of the Jade Scorpion was distributed by Paramount Pictures following the DreamWorks sale. U.K. company WestEnd Films, founded in 2008, later acquired the non-U.S. rights to 11 Woody Allen films in 2010, including The Curse of the Jade Scorpion.

The film received Blu-ray releases in Japan and Spain in December 2015 and March 2017.

== Music ==
The film features a variety of 1940s era music.

- "Sophisticated Lady" (Duke Ellington)
- "Two Sleepy People" (Hoagy Carmichael, Frank Loesser) – Earl 'Fatha' Hines
- "Tuxedo Junction" (Buddy Feyne, William Johnson, Julian Dash, Erskine Hawkins) – Dick Hyman & the Rainbow Room All Stars
- "How High the Moon" (Morgan Lewis, Nancy Hamilton) – Dick Hyman & the Rainbow Room All Stars
- "In a Persian Market" (Albert W. Ketèlbey) – Wilbur De Paris
- "Flatbush Flanagan" (Harry James) – Harry James
- "Sunrise Serenade" (Frankie Carle, Jack Lawrence) – Glenn Miller
