= Hollywood Ending =

2002 film by Woody Allen

- Theatrical release poster
- Directed by: Woody Allen
- Written by: Woody Allen
- Produced by: Letty Aronson
- Starring: Woody Allen; George Hamilton; Téa Leoni; Debra Messing; Mark Rydell; Treat Williams
- Cinematography: Wedigo von Schultzendorff
- Edited by: Alisa Lepselter
- Production company: Gravier Productions
- Distributed by: DreamWorks Pictures (United States); Capitol Films (Overseas)
- Release date: May 3, 2002
- Running time: 112 minutes
- Country: United States
- Language: English
- Budget: $16 million
- Box office: $14.8 million

Hollywood Ending is a 2002 American comedy film written and directed by Woody Allen, who also plays the principal character. It tells the story of a once-famous film director who suffers hysterical blindness due to the intense pressure of directing.

== Plot ==
Val Waxman is a film director that turned into directing television commercials. After being fired from his latest job, a deodorant ad shot in the frozen north of Canada, he desperately seeks a real film project.

Out of the blue, Val receives an offer to direct a big-budget blockbuster to be set in New York City. However, the offer comes from his former wife, Ellie, and her boyfriend, Hal, the studio head who stole her from Val years ago.

Pushed by his agent Al Hack, Val reluctantly agrees to the project, but a psychosomatic ailment strikes him blind just before production is to begin. With Al's encouragement and aid, Val keeps his blindness a secret from the cast and crew (and Hal). During filming, Val rekindles his relationship with Ellie and reconnects with his estranged son, Tony, while his relationship with his much younger girlfriend, Lori, ends. When Val regains what had been missing his life, he regains his sight as well, and realizes that the movie he directed while blind is a disaster.

Sure enough, the movie flops - but is a hit in France, where he is invited to direct a film. After winning Ellie back, he happily proclaims, "Thank God the French exist."

== Cast ==
- Woody Allen as Val Waxman
- George Hamilton as Ed
- Téa Leoni as Ellie
- Debra Messing as Lori Fox
- Mark Rydell as Al Hack
- Treat Williams as Hal Jaeger
- Peter Gerety as Psychiatrist
- Erica Leerhsen as Actress
- Jodie Markell as Andrea Ford
- Isaac Mizrahi as Elio Sebastian
- Marian Seldes as Alexandra
- Aaron Stanford as Actor
- Tiffani Thiessen as Sharon Bates
- Mark Webber as Tony Waxman
- Neal Huff as Commercial A.D.
- Lu Yu as Cameraman
- Barney Cheng as Translator
- Greg Mottola as Assistant Director
- Fred Melamed as Pappas
- Jeff Mazzola as Prop Man
- Joe Rigano as Projectionist
- Rochelle Oliver as Script Supervisor

== Production notes ==
Haskell Wexler was the original cinematographer, but was fired by Woody Allen after a week of filming as they could not agree on how to film certain shots. Wedigo von Schultzendorff replaced Wexler.

== Soundtrack ==
- Going Hollywood (1933) - Music by Nacio Herb Brown - Lyrics by Arthur Freed - Performed by Bing Crosby
- It's Been So Long (1935) - Music by Walter Donaldson - Lyrics by Harold Adamson - Performed by Edmond Hall
- Hooray for Hollywood (1937) - Music by Richard A. Whiting - Lyrics by Johnny Mercer - Performed by Dick Powell, Frances Langford, Johnnie Davis, Gene Krupa & Benny Goodman
- Descarga (1955) - Written by Chico O'Farrill - Performed by Tito Puente
- Sweet And Lovely (1931) - Written by Gus Arnheim, Neil Moret & Harry Tobias - Performed by Barbara Carroll
- Too Close For Comfort (1956) - Written by Jerry Bock, Lawrence Holofcener & George David Weiss - Performed by Jackie Gleason
- Poor Butterfly (1916) - Written by Raymond Hubbell & John Golden - Performed by Bobby Hackett & His Orchestra
- Serenade in Blue (1942) - Music by Harry Warren - Lyrics by Mack Gordon - Performed by Jackie Gleason
- No Moon at All (1947) - Written by David Mann & Redd Evans - Performed by Barbara Carroll
- Grindhouse (1989) - Written by Ivan De Prume, Sean Yseult, Jay Yuenger & Rob Zombie - Performed by White Zombie

== Box office ==
Ticket sales in the United States reach just under $5 million and a worldwide gross of $14.8 million.

It was screened out of competition at the 2002 Cannes Film Festival. In the United Kingdom, it was the first of Allen's films not to receive a theatrical release.

== Critical reception ==
The film received mixed reviews from critics. On Rotten Tomatoes it has a 47% rating based on reviews from 133 critics, with an average rating of 5.4/10. The website's critics consensus states: "Although Hollywood Ending contains some zany one-liners, its promising premise is far from developed." On Metacritic the film has a weighted average score of 46 out of 100, based on 37 reviews. Audiences polled by CinemaScore gave the film an average grade of "B−" on an A+ to F scale.

Film critic Bryant Frazer thought that it suffered from poor editing. He wrote, "What's most frustrating is the sense that Hollywood Ending could have been quite a bit better than it actually is. At 114 minutes, it's decisively lacking in the brevity that used to characterize Allen's pictures—even the super-serious, Bergman-inspired stuff. Worse, his timing seems to be off—the filmmaker who was once notorious for cutting his films to the absolute bone now gives us rambling, overlong shots featuring performers who almost seem to be ad libbing their dialogue. I ran to the Internet Movie Database to investigate, and discovered what may be the problem—Susan Morse is gone. Morse, the editor who had worked with Allen since Manhattan in 1979 and who turned into a real soldier by the time of the jazzy montage that characterized Deconstructing Harry, was reportedly a victim of budget-cutting within the ranks."

In 2016, film critics Robbie Collin and Tim Robey ranked Hollywood Ending as the worst movie by Woody Allen.
