= Melinda and Melinda =

2004 film by Woody Allen

- Theatrical release poster
- Directed by: Woody Allen
- Written by: Woody Allen
- Produced by: Letty Aronson
- Starring: Chiwetel Ejiofor; Will Ferrell; Jonny Lee Miller; Radha Mitchell; Amanda Peet; Chloë Sevigny; Wallace Shawn
- Cinematography: Vilmos Zsigmond
- Edited by: Alisa Lepselter
- Production company: Gravier Productions
- Distributed by: Fox Searchlight Pictures
- Release dates: September 17, 2004 (SSIFF); March 18, 2005 (United States)
- Running time: 99 minutes
- Country: United States
- Language: English
- Box office: $20.1 million

Melinda and Melinda is a 2004 American comedy-drama film written and directed by Woody Allen. The film is set in Manhattan and stars Radha Mitchell as the protagonist Melinda, in two storylines; one tragic and the other comic. It premiered at the 2004 San Sebastián International Film Festival and was given a limited theatrical release in the United States on March 18, 2005, by Fox Searchlight Pictures.

== Plot ==
While having dinner in a Manhattan restaurant, four friends—Max, Sy, Al, and Louise—debate whether the essence of life is comic or tragic. Al relates a real story of a troubled young woman named Melinda Robicheaux who shows up unannounced at a dinner party hosted by a couple, and a series of events involving affairs and a suicide attempt ensues. Playwrights Max and Sy, who specialize in tragedies and comedies, respectively, proceed to tell their own versions of Al's story.

In Max's tragic story, Melinda, a divorced friend of the couple—consisting of Lee, a struggling actor and part-time drama teacher, and Laurel, a wealthy Park Avenue socialite—ends up staying at their apartment. She spent some time in a psychiatric hospital following a suicide attempt, having lost custody of her two children to her ex-husband, a doctor, due to her affair with a photographer. Laurel and mutual friend Cassie decide to set Melinda up with an acquaintance who is a dentist. While Laurel is out one day, Melinda comes home to find that Lee is having an affair with one of his acting students. At a party, after the dentist fails to impress Melinda, she and Laurel both become attracted to concert pianist Ellis Moonsong. As Melinda and Ellis start dating, she confides in him that she intentionally shot her lover dead while she was addicted to pills, and that it was not accidental as everyone believes. One day, Melinda overhears an argument between Laurel and Lee, in which she accuses him of infidelity while he accuses her of throwing herself at Ellis. Melinda is further distressed when her attempt to regain custody of her children falls through. After Laurel and Ellis confirm their affair to her at his apartment, Melinda threatens to jump out of the window, but Ellis stops her while Laurel calls Cassie and asks her to take Melinda in because she has to be watched.

In Sy's comedic story, Melinda is a downstairs neighbor of the couple—struggling actor Hobie and aspiring filmmaker Susan—who shows up at their apartment after attempting suicide by overdosing on sleeping pills. Hobie becomes smitten with Melinda and develops a friendship with her. Despite his relationship with Susan being fraught, Hobie feels guilty about even considering an affair. When Hobie returns home one day, he catches Susan having sex with a potential producer for her next film. Delighted, Hobie breaks up with Susan and asks Melinda out. However, before Hobie can confess his feelings for Melinda, she tells him that she is dating Billy Wheeler, a pianist she met by chance on the street. Melinda and Billy set up a secretly jealous Hobie with Stacey Fox, a Playboy model, and the four go on a double date at a Halloween party. Hobie and Stacey leave the party together and go back to his apartment, but before they can have sex, Stacey realizes that she is still heartbroken over her previous breakup. She suddenly tries to jumps out of Hobie's window before he stops her. Later that night, Hobie finds Melinda lurking outside his apartment; they confess their feelings for each other and kiss.

Without reaching a definitive conclusion on the value of tragedy and comedy, the four friends realize that it is important to appreciate the tragic and comedic moments in life as one never knows when it will end.

== Cast ==
- Chiwetel Ejiofor as Ellis Moonsong
- Will Ferrell as Hobie
- Jonny Lee Miller as Lee
- Radha Mitchell as Melinda Robicheaux
- Amanda Peet as Susan
- Chloë Sevigny as Laurel
- Wallace Shawn as Sy
- David Aaron Baker as Steve Walsh
- Arija Bareikis as Sally Oliver
- Josh Brolin as Greg Earlinger
- Steve Carell as Walt
- Stephanie Roth Haberle as Louise
- Shalom Harlow as Joan
- Zak Orth as Peter
- Larry Pine as Max
- Vinessa Shaw as Stacey Fox
- Brooke Smith as Cassie
- Daniel Sunjata as Billy Wheeler
- Neil Pepe as Al
- Matt Servitto as Jack Oliver
- Andy Borowitz as Doug

Mitchell plays Melinda in both versions. Sevigny, Miller, and Ejiofor star with her in the tragedy, while Ferrell and Peet star with her in the comedy. Carell has a small part as Ferrell's character's friend.

== Production ==
Woody Allen said in Conversations with Woody Allen that he wanted to cast Winona Ryder in the title role. He had to replace her with Radha Mitchell because no one would insure Ryder due to her arrest for shoplifting; this would have made it impossible to obtain a film completion bond. Allen stated he was sad because he had written the part for Ryder after working with her on Celebrity (1998). In the same interview, he also claimed to have intended Ferrell's part for Robert Downey Jr., but, again, insurance got in the way due to Downey's history of arrests and drug abuse.

The film also stars Wallace Shawn (alluding to his dinner-philosophy argument in My Dinner with Andre) as the comic playwright, Larry Pine as the tragedian, and Brooke Smith as Cassie. All three had appeared in the 1994 film Vanya on 42nd Street, directed by Louis Malle.

== Reception ==
=== Box office ===
Melinda and Melinda grossed $3.8 million in the United States and Canada, and $16.3 million in other territories, for a worldwide total of $20.1 million. The film opened on March 18, 2005, in one New York City cinema, where it grossed $74,238 in its first three days. On its second weekend, it expanded to 95 theaters to gross $740,619, seeing its per-screen average drop to $7,795.

=== Critical response ===
Melinda and Melinda received mixed reviews from critics. On the review aggregator website Rotten Tomatoes, the film holds an approval rating of 51% based on 157 reviews, with an average rating of 5.7/10. The website's critics consensus reads, "Woody Allen's uneven Melinda and Melinda fails to find neither comedy nor pathos in what seems like a rehash of his previous themes." Metacritic, which uses a weighted average, assigned the film a score of 54 out of 100, based on 40 critics, indicating "mixed or average" reviews. Leonard Maltin gave the film two stars, calling it "meandering", with "echoes ... of earlier, better Allen movies".

== Soundtrack ==
Melinda and Melinda

Soundtrack album
- Released: March 8, 2005 (UK)
- Genres: Swing; big band
- Label: Milan
- Producer: Emmanuel Chamboredon

The soundtrack album to the film was released on March 8, 2005, by Milan Records. It mostly features a selection of swing music and big band tracks, which is typical for Allen's films.

=== Track listing ===
Side A
No.	Title	Performer	Length
1.	"Take the 'A' Train"	Duke Ellington and His Orchestra	4:38
2.	"Best Things in Life Are Free"	Erroll Garner	4:11
3.	"Somebody Stole My Gal"	Erroll Garner	3:25
4.	"I Let a Song Go Out of My Heart"	Duke Ellington and His Orchestra	4:45
5.	"Memories of You/Moonglow/No Moon at All/Darn that Dream"	Dick Hyman	5:27
6.	"Concerto in D for String Orchestra: 2.Arioso: Andantino"	English Chamber Orchestra	4:51
7.	"String Quartet No. 4"	Shanghai Quartet	4:33
8.	"Prelude 2 Well Tempered Clavier"	Dick Hyman	3:15
9.	"Love Me"	Dick Hyman	2:35
10.	"Don't Get Around Much Anymore"	Dick Hyman	4:39
11.	"In a Mellow Tone"	Duke Ellington	4:47
12.	"Will You Still Be Mine?"	Erroll Garner	4:12
