= Match Point =

2005 film by Woody Allen

- US theatrical release poster
- Directed by: Woody Allen
- Written by: Woody Allen
- Produced by: Letty Aronson; Gareth Wiley; Lucy Darwin
- Starring: Brian Cox; Matthew Goode; Scarlett Johansson; Emily Mortimer; Jonathan Rhys Meyers; Penelope Wilton
- Cinematography: Remi Adefarasin
- Edited by: Alisa Lepselter
- Production companies: BBC Films; Thema Production; Jada Productions
- Distributed by: Icon Film Distribution (United Kingdom, Australia and New Zealand); Cinéart (Benelux); DreamWorks Pictures (North America)
- Release dates: 12 May 2005 (Cannes); 28 October 2005 (Luxembourg); 28 December 2005 (United States); 6 January 2006 (United Kingdom)
- Running time: 124 minutes
- Countries: United Kingdom; Luxembourg; United States
- Language: English
- Budget: $15 million
- Box office: $85.6 million

Match Point is a 2005 psychological thriller film written and directed by Woody Allen, and starring Jonathan Rhys Meyers, Scarlett Johansson, Emily Mortimer, Matthew Goode, Brian Cox, and Penelope Wilton. In the film, Rhys Meyers' character, a former professional tennis player, marries into a wealthy family, but his social position is threatened by his affair with his brother-in-law's girlfriend, played by Scarlett Johansson. The film deals with themes of morality and greed, and explores the roles of lust, money, and luck in life, leading many to compare it to Allen's earlier film Crimes and Misdemeanors (1989). It was produced and filmed in London after Allen had difficulty finding financial support for the film in New York. The agreement obliged him to make it there using a cast and crew mostly from the United Kingdom. Allen quickly re-wrote the script, which was originally set in New York, for an English setting.

Critics in the United States praised the film and its English setting and welcomed it as a return to form for Allen. In contrast, reviewers from the United Kingdom treated Match Point less favourably, finding fault with the locations and especially the British idiom in the dialogues. Allen was nominated for an Academy Award for Best Original Screenplay.

== Plot ==
Recently retired tennis pro Chris Wilton is hired as an instructor at an upscale London club. He becomes friendly with wealthy club member, Tom Hewett. Tom's sister, Chloe, is smitten with Chris, and they begin dating. During a family gathering, Chris meets Tom's American fiancée Nola Rice, an aspiring actress. They are immediately attracted to each other.

After Chloe persuades her father to give Chris an entry-level job at his company, he gradually blends into the family. While the clan gathers at the Hewett country house, Tom's mother, Eleanor, condescendingly questions Nola's struggling acting career, causing a dejected Nola to leave the house during a thunderstorm. Chris follows Nola and confesses his feelings for her. They kiss and have sex in a wheat field, but Nola considers the encounter a mistake while Chris wants an ongoing affair. Chris and Chloe marry, while Tom ends his relationship with Nola after falling in love with someone else.

Chloe is obsessed with becoming pregnant, though Chris acts ambivalent and tries to track down Nola. When he happens to run into her, they begin an affair. When Nola becomes pregnant, Chris panics. He tells her to get an abortion, but she wants them to raise the child together. Chris becomes distant from Chloe, who suspects he is having an affair, which Chris denies. Nola presses Chris to divorce Chloe. Though Chris finds Chloe boring, he is unwilling to give up his promising career and the affluent lifestyle their marriage affords him. Chris feels trapped and lies to both Chloe and Nola.

Tired of waiting, Nola angrily confronts Chris outside his apartment and threatens to tell Chloe everything. Desperate to cover it up, Chris later takes one of his father-in-law's hunting shotguns. He calls Nola saying he has good news and wants them to meet at her place. He gains entry into her neighbor Mrs. Eastby's flat and fatally shoots her, then stages a burglary by ransacking the rooms and stealing jewelry and prescription drugs. He hides in the hallway and kills Nola when she returns. He then meets Chloe at the theatre. Scotland Yard concludes the crime was likely committed by a drug addict. The next day, when the murder is reported in the news, Chris sneaks the shotgun back into the gun case. He and Chloe then announce to the family that she is pregnant.

Detective Banner contacts Chris to request an interview concerning the murders. Before meeting the detectives, Chris throws Mrs. Eastby's jewelry and medicines into the river. By chance, her wedding ring bounces off the railing and falls to the pavement. At the police station, Chris lies about his relationship with Nola, but Banner surprises him with her diary, in which Chris is extensively featured. He confesses his affair but denies any link to the murder. Chris appeals to the detectives to avoid involving him further to protect his marriage. They agree to be discreet.

Late one night, Nola and Mrs. Eastby appear as apparitions and warn Chris that his actions will have consequences. Nola berates him for his clumsy planning and execution, as if wanting to be caught; Chris defends his crimes, though wrong, were committed for a "grander scheme", and he can suppress his guilt. The same night, Banner dreams that Chris committed the murders. The next day, however, Banner's partner Dowd discredits his theory by revealing a drug addict found murdered on the streets had Eastby's ring. The detectives consider the case closed. Months later, Chloe has a baby boy. Tom blesses his newborn nephew with luck rather than greatness.

== Cast ==
- Jonathan Rhys Meyers as Chris Wilton
- Scarlett Johansson as Nola Rice
- Emily Mortimer as Chloe Hewett Wilton
- Matthew Goode as Tom Hewett
- Brian Cox as Alec Hewett
- Penelope Wilton as Eleanor Hewett
- Ewen Bremner as Inspector Dowd
- James Nesbitt as Detective Mike Banner
- Rupert Penry-Jones as Henry
- Margaret Tyzack as Betty Eastby
- Alexander Armstrong as Mr. Townsend
- Geoffrey Streatfeild as Alan Sinclair
- Miranda Raison as Heather
- Zoe Telford as Samantha
- Rose Keegan as Carol
- Colin Salmon as Ian
- Toby Kebbell as Policeman
- Paul Kaye as Estate Agent
- Steve Pemberton as Detective Parry

== Production ==
The script was originally set in The Hamptons, a wealthy enclave in New York, but was transferred to London when Allen found financing for the film there. The film was partly funded by BBC Films, which required that he make the film in the UK with largely local cast and crew. In an interview with The Observer, Allen explained that he was allowed "the same kind of creative liberal attitude that I'm used to", in London. He complained that the American studio system was not interested in making small films: "They only want these $100 million pictures that make $500m." The production budget was an estimated $15 million. A further change was required when Kate Winslet, who was supposed to play the part of Nola Rice, resigned a week before filming was scheduled to begin. Scarlett Johansson was offered the part, and accepted, but the character had to be re-written as an American. According to Allen, "It was not a problem... It took about an hour."

Filming took place in London in the summer of 2004 over a seven-week schedule. Some of the city's landmarks, such as Tate Modern, Norman Foster's "Gherkin" building at 30 St Mary Axe, Richard Rogers' Lloyd's building, the Royal Opera House, the Palace of Westminster, Blackfriars Bridge, and Cambridge Circus form a backdrop to the film. The tennis club scenes were filmed at the Queen's Club. One of the University of Westminster's Marylebone campus lecture theatres was also used. UK-based graffiti artist Banksy's Girl With Balloon appears briefly in the film. One of the Parliament View apartments at Lambeth Bridge was used for interiors of Chris and Chloe's apartment. The restaurant scene was shot at the Covent Garden Hotel.

== Themes ==
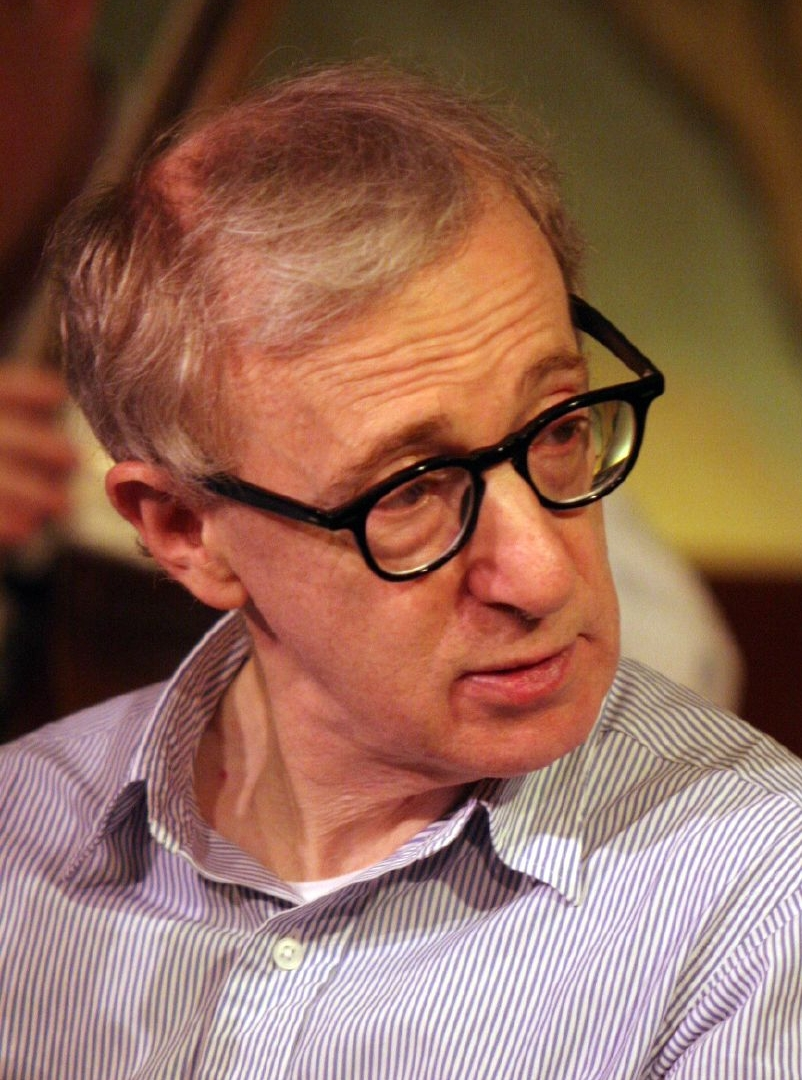
Woody Allen, 2006

The film's opening voiceover from Chris introduces its themes of chance and fate, which he characterises as simple luck, to him all-important. The sequence establishes the protagonist as an introvert, a man who mediates his experience of the world through deliberation, and positions the film's subjective perspective through his narrative eyes. Charalampos Goyios argued that this hero, as an opera lover, maintains a sense of distance from the outer world and that ramifications therein pale in comparison to the purity of interior experience.

The film is a debate with Fyodor Dostoevsky's Crime and Punishment, which Chris is seen reading early on, identifying him with the anti-hero Raskolnikov. That character is a brooding loner who kills two women to prove that he is a superior being, but is racked by guilt and is finally redeemed by confession of his crime, the love of a young woman forced into prostitution, and the discovery of God. Chris is a brooding loner who kills a poor girl who loves him because he considers his interests superior to those around him, knows little guilt, and avoids detection through luck. Allen signals his intentions with more superficial similarities: both are almost caught by a painter's unexpected appearance in the stairwell, and both sleuths play cat and mouse with the suspect. Allen argues, unlike Dostoevsky, that there is neither God, nor punishment, nor love to provide redemption. The theme of parody and reversal of Dostoevsky's motifs and subject matter has been visited by Allen before, in his film Love and Death. In Love and Death, the dialogue and scenarios parody Russian novels, particularly those by Dostoevsky and Tolstoy, such as The Brothers Karamazov, Crime and Punishment, The Gambler, The Idiot, and War and Peace. In Match Point, Allen moves the theme from parody to the more direct engagement of Dostoevsky's motifs and narratives.

Allen revisits some of the themes he had explored in Crimes and Misdemeanors (1989), such as the existence of justice in the universe. Both films feature a murder of an unwanted mistress, and "offer a depressing view on fate, fidelity, and the nature of man". That film's protagonist, Judah Rosenthal, is an affluent member of the upper-middle class having an extramarital affair. After he tries to break the affair off, his mistress blackmails him and threatens to go to his wife. Soon, Rosenthal decides to murder his mistress but is racked with guilt over violating his moral code. Eventually, he learns to ignore his guilt and go on as though nothing has happened. Philip French compared the two films' plots and themes in The Observer, and characterised Match Point's as a "clever twist on the themes of chance and fate".

Money is an important motivator for the characters: both Chris and Nola come from modest backgrounds and wish to enter the Hewett family using their sex appeal. That family's secure position is demonstrated by their large country estate, and, early on in their relationships, both prospective spouses are supported by Mr. Hewett Wilton with a position on "one of his companies". Nola reports being "swept off her feet" by Hewett's attention and presents. Roger Ebert posed the film's underlying question as "To what degree are we prepared to set aside our moral qualms in order to indulge in greed and selfishness? Wilton is facing a choice between greed and lust, but his sweet wife, Chloe, herself has no qualms about having her father essentially 'buy' her husband for her."

Jean-Baptiste Morain, writing in Les Inrockuptibles, noticed how the strong do not accept their own weakness and have no qualms about perpetuating an injustice to defend their interests. This wider political sense is, he argued, accentuated by its English setting, where class differences are more marked than in the USA. The film pits passion and the dream of happiness against ambition and arrivisme, resolving the dispute with a pitiless blow that disallows all chance of justice.

== Musical accompaniment ==
The film's soundtrack consists almost entirely of pre-World War I 78 rpm recordings of opera arias sung by the Italian tenor Enrico Caruso. This bold use, despite Caruso's variety of musical styles, constitutes a first for Allen. Opera has been used before in his work as an indicator of social class, such as in Husbands and Wives (1992). In Match Point, the arias and opera extracts make an ironic commentary on the actions of the characters and sometimes foreshadow developments in the movie's narrative. Furthermore, given Chris's status as an introvert and opera enthusiast himself, the accompaniment emphasises his detachment from his crime.

The 10-minute murder scene which forms the film's climax is scored with almost the whole of the Act II duet between Otello and Iago from Giuseppe Verdi's Otello. This is an atypical scoring for a film since Verdi's piece is not an aria, but a dramatic dialogue in which the words are as important as the music. Thus the astute spectator will be presented with two dramatic narratives to follow; Allen is not respecting traditional conventions of cinematic accompaniment since the score's events do not match the story unfolding onscreen.

Arias and extracts include work by Verdi (in particular Macbeth, La traviata, Il trovatore and Rigoletto), Gaetano Donizetti's L'elisir d'amore, Georges Bizet's Les pêcheurs de perles, and Antônio Carlos Gomes's Salvator Rosa sung by Caruso. The romanza "Una furtiva lagrima" from L'elisir d'amore is featured repeatedly, including during the opening credits. The Caruso arias are supplemented by diegetic music from contemporary performances that the characters attend over the course of the film. There are scenes at the Royal Opera House and elsewhere performed by opera singers (scenes from La traviata performed by Janis Kelly and Alan Oke, from Rigoletto performed by Mary Hegarty), accompanied by a piano (performed by Tim Lole).

== Reception ==
=== Critical response ===
Allen has said that Match Point is one of his few "A-films", and even "arguably may be the best film that I've made. This is strictly accidental, it just happened to come out right. You know, I try to make them all good, but some come out and some don't. With this one, everything seemed to come out right. The actors fell in, the photography fell in and the story clicked. I caught a lot of breaks!"

The film was screened out of competition at the 2005 Cannes Film Festival. Match Point broke a streak of box office flops for Allen: it earned $85,306,374 worldwide, of which $23,151,529 was in its North American run. Allen was also nominated for an Academy Award for Best Original Screenplay.

The film received favourable reviews from critics, particularly in the United States. On Rotten Tomatoes, the film has an approval rating of 77% based on 216 reviews with an average rating of 7.2/10. The website's critics consensus reads, "Woody Allen's sharpest film in years, Match Point is a taut, philosophical thriller about class and infidelity." Metacritic reported the film had an average score of 72 out of 100, and thus "generally favorable reviews", based on 40 professional critics. Audiences polled by CinemaScore gave the film an average grade of "B−" on an A+ to F scale.

Roger Ebert gave the film a full four stars, and considered it among the four best Allen films. He described it as having a "terrible fascination that lasts all the way through". Empire magazine gave the film four stars out of five, calling it Allen's best of his last half a dozen films, and recommended it even to those who are not fans of the director.

Reviewers in the United Kingdom were generally less favourable. Philip French, writing in The Observer, criticised Allen's grasp of British idiom and the film's lack of humour, especially considering that two comic actors from the UK were cast in minor roles. Also, he called the dialogue "rather lumbering" and said that "the lexicons of neither the City financier nor the London constable are used convincingly." Tim Robey, writing in The Daily Telegraph, disdained the claim that the film was Allen's return to form. Although he acknowledged that the consensus was stronger this time, he called it "as flat-footed a movie as Allen has ever made, a decent idea scuppered by a setting – London – which he treats with the peculiarly tin-eared reverence of a visitor who only thinks he knows his way around." He called Johansson's character "the chain-smoking mistress from hell", but said the tennis net analogy has an "unexpectedly crisp payoff" and that the last act was well handled. Reviewing for the BBC's website, Andy Jacobs awarded the film four stars out of five and called it Allen's best film since Deconstructing Harry (1997). He also criticised some other British reviewers whose dislike, Jacobs stated, was due to the fact that Allen presented an agreeable portrait of middle-class life in London. He also praised the performances by Rhys Meyers and Johansson.

Like many of Allen's films, Match Point was popular in France: AlloCiné, a cinema information website, gave it a score of 4.4 out of 5, based on a sample of 30 reviews. In Les Inrockuptibles, a left-wing French cultural magazine, Jean-Baptiste Morain gave the film a strong review, calling it "one of his most accomplished films". He characterised Allen's move to London as re-invigorating for him while recognising the caricatured portrayal of Britain which made the film less appreciated there than in Allen's homeland, the United States. Morain called Rhys-Meyers and Johansson's performances "impeccable".

Match Point has also been the object of scholarship. Joseph Henry Vogel argued the film is exemplary of ecocriticism as an economic school of thought. Several critics and commentators have compared elements of the film to the central plot of George Stevens' film A Place in the Sun (1951), but with some characters in reverse positions.

=== Accolades ===
Award	Date of ceremony	Category	Recipient	Result	Ref.
Academy Awards	March 5, 2006	Best Original Screenplay	Woody Allen	Nominated	
César Awards	February 25, 2006	Best Foreign Film	Match Point	Nominated	
Golden Eagle Award	January 27, 2007	Best Foreign Language Film	Match Point	Nominated	
Golden Globe Awards	January 16, 2006	Best Motion Picture – Drama	Match Point	Nominated	
Golden Globe Awards	January 16, 2006	Best Director	Woody Allen	Nominated	
Golden Globe Awards	January 16, 2006	Best Screenplay	Woody Allen	Nominated	
Golden Globe Awards	January 16, 2006	Best Supporting Actress	Scarlett Johansson	Nominated	
National Board of Review	January 10, 2006	Top Ten Films	Match Point	Top 10	
