= List of awards and nominations received by Woody Allen =

Woody Allen awards and nominations
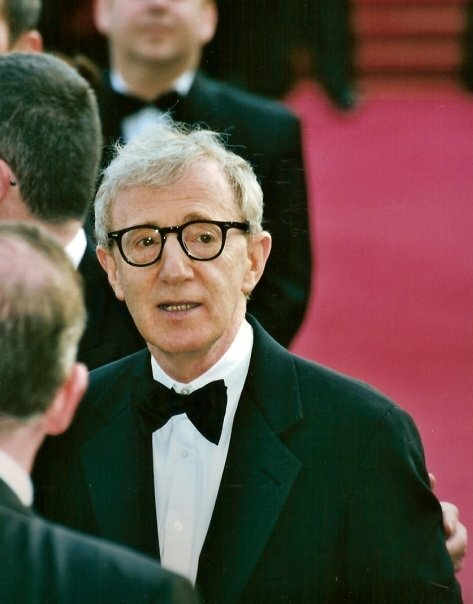
- Allen at the Cannes Film Festival in 2005
Awards and nominations
| Award | Wins | Nominations |
| Academy Awards | 4 | 24 |
| BAFTA Awards | 10 | 24 |
| Emmy Awards | 0 | 1 |
| Grammy Awards | 1 | 3 |
| Golden Globes | 2 | 13 |
| Tony Awards | 0 | 1 |

Totals (Note: Certain award groups do not simply award one winner. They acknowledge several different recipients, have runners-up, and have third place. Since this is a specific recognition and is different from losing an award, runner-up mentions are considered wins in this award tally. For simplification and to avoid errors, each award in this list has been presumed to have had a prior nomination.)
- Wins: 17
- Nominations: 56

Woody Allen is an American filmmaker, writer, actor, and comedian. Throughout his career he has received a considerable number of awards and distinctions including four Academy Awards, ten BAFTA Awards, two Golden Globe Awards and a Grammy Award as well as nominations for a Emmy Award and a Tony Award. His honorary awards include an Honorary Golden Lion in 1995, the Directors Guild of America Lifetime Achievement Award in 1996, the BAFTA Fellowship in 1997, the Honorary Palme d'Or in 2002, and the Golden Globe Cecil B. DeMille Award in 2014.

Allen has won three Oscars for Best Original Screenplay for Annie Hall (1977), Hannah and Her Sisters (1986), and Midnight in Paris (2011), and one for Best Director for Annie Hall. He has been nominated 24 times: 16 as a screenwriter, seven as a director, and once as an actor. As of 2026, Allen has the most wins and nominations in the Best Original Screenplay category. He also holds the record as the oldest winner (at age 76) of the Academy Award for Best Original Screenplay (Midnight in Paris, 2011).

Despite friendly recognition from the Academy, Allen has consistently refused to attend the ceremony or acknowledge his Oscar wins. His publicly given reason is his standing engagement to play clarinet in a Monday night ensemble. Back in 1974, Allen was quoted by ABC News as saying, "The whole concept of awards is silly. I cannot abide by the judgment of other people, because if you accept it when they say you deserve an award, then you have to accept it when they say you don't". He broke this pattern once; at the Academy Awards ceremony in 2002, Allen made an unannounced appearance, pleading for producers to continue filming their movies in New York City after the September 11 attacks. He was given a standing ovation before introducing a montage of movie clips featuring New York edited by filmmaker Nora Ephron.

As a writer, Allen won the 1978 O. Henry Award for his short story The Kugelmass Episode, published in The New Yorker on May 2, 1977. On television, he wrote for The Sid Caesar Show earning a Primetime Emmy Award for Outstanding Writing for a Variety Series nomination. On stage, he wrote the Broadway comedic play Play It Again, Sam (1969) and the musical Bullets over Broadway (2014), the later of which earned him a nomination for the Tony Award for Best Book of a Musical. As a standup comedian He was nominated for the Grammy Award for Best Comedy Album for Woody Allen (1964). He won the Grammy Award for Best Compilation Soundtrack for Visual Media for Midnight in Paris (2011).

Woody Allen has received 24 BAFTA Film Awards nominations, winning 10 awards for the films, Annie Hall (1977), Manhattan (1979), Broadway Danny Rose (1984), The Purple Rose of Cairo (1985), Hannah and Her Sisters (1986) and Husbands and Wives (1992). (Note: In addition, he has received the British Academy's most prestigious honorary award, the Fellowship. The 1978 best film BAFTA win for Annie Hall went to Charles H. Joffe and Jack Rollins, as the category that year only credited the producers. In 1980, the best film category credited only the director. From 1985 to 1998, both the director and producers were credited.) In 2014, Woody Allen was chosen by the Hollywood Foreign Press to receive the Cecil B. DeMille Award for his contributions to the industry. Actress Emma Stone presented a film montage of his work with frequent collaborator Diane Keaton accepting the award on behalf of Allen. (Note: who famously never shows up to award shows)

== Major associations ==
=== Academy Awards ===
| Year | Category | Nominated work | Result | Ref. |
|---|---|---|---|---|
| 1977 | Best Director | Annie Hall | Won | |
| 1977 | Best Actor | Annie Hall | Nominated | |
| 1977 | Best Original Screenplay | Annie Hall | Won | |
| 1978 | Best Director | Interiors | Nominated | |
| 1978 | Best Original Screenplay | Interiors | Nominated | |
| 1979 | Best Original Screenplay | Manhattan | Nominated | |
| 1984 | Best Director | Broadway Danny Rose | Nominated | |
| 1984 | Best Original Screenplay | Broadway Danny Rose | Nominated | |
| 1985 | Best Original Screenplay | The Purple Rose of Cairo | Nominated | |
| 1986 | Best Director | Hannah and Her Sisters | Nominated | |
| 1986 | Best Original Screenplay | Hannah and Her Sisters | Won | |
| 1987 | Best Original Screenplay | Radio Days | Nominated | |
| 1989 | Best Director | Crimes and Misdemeanors | Nominated | |
| 1989 | Best Original Screenplay | Crimes and Misdemeanors | Nominated | |
| 1990 | Best Original Screenplay | Alice | Nominated | |
| 1992 | Best Original Screenplay | Husbands and Wives | Nominated | |
| 1994 | Best Director | Bullets Over Broadway | Nominated | |
| 1994 | Best Original Screenplay | Bullets Over Broadway | Nominated | |
| 1995 | Best Original Screenplay | Mighty Aphrodite | Nominated | |
| 1997 | Best Original Screenplay | Deconstructing Harry | Nominated | |
| 2005 | Best Original Screenplay | Match Point | Nominated | |
| 2012 | Best Director | Midnight in Paris | Nominated | |
| 2012 | Best Original Screenplay | Midnight in Paris | Won | |
| 2013 | Best Original Screenplay | Blue Jasmine | Nominated | |

=== BAFTA Awards ===
| Year | Category | Nominated work | Result | Ref. |
British Academy Film Awards
| 1977 | Best Actor in a Leading Role | Annie Hall | Nominated | |
| 1977 | Best Direction | Annie Hall | Won | |
| 1977 | Best Screenplay | Annie Hall | Won | |
| 1979 | Best Film | Manhattan | Won | |
| 1979 | Best Actor in a Leading Role | Manhattan | Nominated | |
| 1979 | Best Direction | Manhattan | Nominated | |
| 1979 | Best Screenplay | Manhattan | Won | |
| 1983 | Best Original Screenplay | Zelig | Nominated | |
| 1984 | Best Original Screenplay | Broadway Danny Rose | Won | |
| 1985 | Best Film | The Purple Rose of Cairo | Won | |
| 1985 | Best Original Screenplay | The Purple Rose of Cairo | Won | |
| 1986 | Best Film | Hannah and Her Sisters | Nominated | |
| 1986 | Best Direction | Hannah and Her Sisters | Won | |
| 1986 | Best Actor in a Leading Role | Hannah and Her Sisters | Nominated | |
| 1986 | Best Original Screenplay | Hannah and Her Sisters | Won | |
| 1987 | Best Film | Radio Days | Nominated | |
| 1987 | Best Original Screenplay | Radio Days | Nominated | |
| 1989 | Best Film | Crimes and Misdemeanors | Nominated | |
| 1989 | Best Direction | Crimes and Misdemeanors | Nominated | |
| 1989 | Best Original Screenplay | Crimes and Misdemeanors | Nominated | |
| 1992 | Best Original Screenplay | Husbands and Wives | Won | |
| 1994 | Best Original Screenplay | Bullets Over Broadway | Nominated | |
| 1997 | BAFTA Fellowship | | Honored | |
| 2011 | Best Original Screenplay | Midnight in Paris | Nominated | |
| 2013 | Best Original Screenplay | Blue Jasmine | Nominated | |

=== Emmy Awards ===
| Year | Category | Nominated work | Result | Ref. |
Primetime Emmy Awards
| 1959 | Outstanding Writing for a Variety Program | The Sid Caesar Show | Nominated | |

=== Golden Globe Awards ===
| Year | Category | Nominated work | Result | Ref. |
|---|---|---|---|---|
| 1977 | Best Director - Motion Picture | Annie Hall | Nominated | |
| 1977 | Best Screenplay | Annie Hall | Nominated | |
| 1977 | Best Actor – Musical or Comedy | Annie Hall | Nominated | |
| 1978 | Best Director - Motion Picture | Interiors | Nominated | |
| 1978 | Best Screenplay | Interiors | Nominated | |
| 1983 | Best Actor - Musical or Comedy | Zelig | Nominated | |
| 1985 | Best Screenplay | The Purple Rose of Cairo | Won | |
| 1986 | Best Director - Motion Picture | Hannah and Her Sisters | Nominated | |
| 1986 | Best Screenplay | Hannah and Her Sisters | Nominated | |
| 2005 | Best Director - Motion Picture | Match Point | Nominated | |
| 2005 | Best Screenplay | Match Point | Nominated | |
| 2011 | Best Director - Motion Picture | Midnight in Paris | Nominated | |
| 2011 | Best Screenplay | Midnight in Paris | Won | |
| 2013 | Cecil B. DeMille Award | | Won | |

=== Grammy Awards ===
| Year | Category | Nominated work | Result | Ref. |
|---|---|---|---|---|
| 1964 | Best Comedy Album | Woody Allen | Nominated | |
| 2010 | Best Spoken Word Album | The Woody Allen Collection | Nominated | |
| 2012 | Best Compilation Soundtrack for Visual Media | Midnight in Paris | Won | |

=== Tony Awards ===
| Year | Category | Nominated work | Result | Ref. |
|---|---|---|---|---|
| 2014 | Best Book of a Musical | Bullets Over Broadway | Nominated | |

== Festival awards ==
| Organizations | Year | Category | Work | Result | Ref. |
|---|---|---|---|---|---|
| Cannes Film Festival | 1985 | FIPRESCI Prize | The Purple Rose of Cairo | Won | |
| Cannes Film Festival | 2002 | Honorary Palme d'Or | | Won | |
| Berlin Film Festival | 1975 | Silver Bear for Outstanding Artistic Contribution | Love and Death | Won | |
| Berlin Film Festival | 1975 | Golden Bear | Love and Death | Nominated | |
| Berlin Film Festival | 1975 | Silver Berlin Award | | Honored | |
| Venice Film Festival | 1983 | Pasinetti Award | Zelig | Won | |
| Venice Film Festival | 1995 | Career Golden Lion | | Honored | |

== Miscellaneous awards ==
| Organizations | Year | Category | Work | Result | Ref. |
|---|---|---|---|---|---|
| American Comedy Awards | 1986 | Funniest Actor in a Leading Role | Hannah and Her Sisters | Won | |
| American Comedy Awards | 1986 | Lifetime Achievement Award | | Honored | |
| César Awards | 1977 | Best Foreign Film | Annie Hall | Nominated | |
| César Awards | 1979 | Best Foreign Film | Manhattan | Won | |
| César Awards | 1985 | Best Foreign Film | The Purple Rose of Cairo | Won | |
| César Awards | 1986 | Best Foreign Film | Hannah and Her Sisters | Nominated | |
| César Awards | 1990 | Best Foreign Film | Alice | Nominated | |
| César Awards | 1992 | Best Foreign Film | Husbands and Wives | Nominated | |
| César Awards | 1993 | Best Foreign Film | Manhattan Murder Mystery | Nominated | |
| César Awards | 1997 | Best Foreign Film | Everyone Says I Love You | Nominated | |
| César Awards | 2005 | Best Foreign Film | Match Point | Nominated | |
| César Awards | 2013 | Best Foreign Film | Blue Jasmine | Nominated | |
| Critics' Choice Awards | 2011 | Best Original Screenplay | Midnight in Paris | Won | |
| Critics' Choice Awards | 2013 | Best Original Screenplay | Blue Jasmine | Nominated | |
| Directors Guild of America Awards | 1977 | Outstanding Achievement – Feature Film | Annie Hall | Won | |
| Directors Guild of America Awards | 1979 | Outstanding Achievement – Feature Film | Manhattan | Nominated | |
| Directors Guild of America Awards | 1986 | Outstanding Achievement – Feature Film | Hannah and Her Sisters | Nominated | |
| Directors Guild of America Awards | 1989 | Outstanding Achievement – Feature Film | Crimes and Misdemeanors | Nominated | |
| Directors Guild of America Awards | 1996 | Lifetime Achievement Award | | Honored | |
| Directors Guild of America Awards | 2011 | Outstanding Achievement – Feature Film | Midnight in Paris | Nominated | |
| Independent Spirit Awards | 1994 | Best Screenplay | Bullets Over Broadway | Nominated | |
| Independent Spirit Awards | 2008 | Best Screenplay | Vicky Cristina Barcelona | Won | |
| Independent Spirit Awards | 2013 | Best Screenplay | Blue Jasmine | Nominated | |
| Saturn Awards | 1984 | Best Direction | Zelig | Nominated | |
| Saturn Awards | 1986 | Best Direction | The Purple Rose of Cairo | Nominated | |
| Saturn Awards | 1986 | Best Writing^{[II]} | The Purple Rose of Cairo | Nominated | |
| Saturn Awards | 1986 | President's Award | The Purple Rose of Cairo | Won | |
| Writers Guild of America Awards | 1965 | Best Written Comedy | What's New Pussycat? | Nominated | |
| Writers Guild of America Awards | 1969 | Best Written Comedy | Take the Money and Run | Nominated | |
| Writers Guild of America Awards | 1971 | Best Written Comedy | Bananas | Nominated | |
| Writers Guild of America Awards | 1973 | Best Written Comedy | Sleeper | Nominated | |
| Writers Guild of America Awards | 1977 | Best Written Comedy | Annie Hall | Won | |
| Writers Guild of America Awards | 1978 | Best Written Drama | Interiors | Nominated | |
| Writers Guild of America Awards | 1979 | Best Written Comedy | Manhattan | Nominated | |
| Writers Guild of America Awards | 1980 | Best Written Comedy | Stardust Memories | Nominated | |
| Writers Guild of America Awards | 1983 | Best Written Comedy | Zelig | Nominated | |
| Writers Guild of America Awards | 1984 | Best Original Screenplay | Broadway Danny Rose | Won | |
| Writers Guild of America Awards | 1985 | Best Original Screenplay | The Purple Rose of Cairo | Nominated | |
| Writers Guild of America Awards | 1986 | Best Original Screenplay | Hannah and Her Sisters | Won | |
| Writers Guild of America Awards | 1986 | Laurel Award for Screenwriting Achievement | | Honored | |
| Writers Guild of America Awards | 1987 | Best Original Screenplay | Radio Days | Nominated | |
| Writers Guild of America Awards | 1989 | Best Original Screenplay | Crimes and Misdemeanors | Won | |
| Writers Guild of America Awards | 1990 | Best Original Screenplay | Alice | Nominated | |
| Writers Guild of America Awards | 1992 | Best Original Screenplay | Husbands and Wives | Nominated | |
| Writers Guild of America Awards | 1994 | Best Original Screenplay | Bullets Over Broadway | Nominated | |
| Writers Guild of America Awards | 1995 | Best Original Screenplay | Mighty Aphrodite | Nominated | |
| Writers Guild of America Awards | 2008 | Best Original Screenplay | Vicky Cristina Barcelona | Nominated | |
| Writers Guild of America Awards | 2011 | Best Original Screenplay | Midnight in Paris | Won | |
| Writers Guild of America Awards | 2013 | Best Original Screenplay | Blue Jasmine | Nominated | |

== Honorary awards ==
| Organizations | Year | Notes | Result | Ref. |
|---|---|---|---|---|
| Berlin International Film Festival | 1975 | Silver Berlin Bear | Honored | |
| Venice International Film Festival | 1995 | Honorary Golden Lion | Honored | |
| Directors Guild of America | 1996 | Lifetime Achievement Award | Honored | |
| Entertainment Weekly | 1996 | ranked No. 19 greatest directors (Note: out of 50) | Honored | |
| British Academy Film Awards | 1997 | BAFTA Fellowship | Honored | |
| Cannes Film Festival | 2002 | Honorary Palme d'Or | Honored | |
| Leonor, Princess of Asturias | 2002 | Prince of Asturias Award. (Note: Subsequently, the city of Oviedo, Spain, erected a life-size statue of Allen.) | Honored | |
| Comedy Central | 2005 | Allen was voted the fourth greatest stand-up comedian | Honored | |
| The Guardian | 2005 | Allen was voted the third greatest comedian (Note: UK poll The Comedian's Comedian voted on by fellow comedians) | Honored | |
| Pompeu Fabra University | 2007 | PhD Honoris Causa | Honored | |
| Hollywood Foreign Press Association | 2014 | Golden Globe Cecil B. DeMille Award | Honored | |

== Awards and nominations received by Allen's films ==
| Year | Title | Academy Awards | | BAFTA Awards | | Golden Globe Awards | |
| Year | Title | Nominations | Wins | Nominations | Wins | Nominations | Wins |
|---|---|---|---|---|---|---|---|
| 1977 | Annie Hall | 5 | 4 | 6 | 5 | 5 | 1 |
| 1978 | Interiors | 5 | | 2 | 1 | 4 | |
| 1979 | Manhattan | 2 | | 10 | 2 | 1 | |
| 1983 | Zelig | 2 | | 5 | | 2 | |
| 1984 | Broadway Danny Rose | 2 | | 1 | 1 | 1 | |
| 1985 | The Purple Rose of Cairo | 1 | | 6 | 1 | 4 | 2 |
| 1986 | Hannah and Her Sisters | 7 | 3 | 8 | 2 | 5 | 1 |
| 1987 | Radio Days | 2 | | 7 | 2 | | |
| 1989 | Crimes and Misdemeanors | 3 | | 6 | | 1 | |
| 1990 | Alice | 1 | | | | 1 | |
| 1992 | Husbands and Wives | 2 | | 2 | 1 | 1 | |
| 1993 | Manhattan Murder Mystery | | | 1 | | 1 | |
| 1994 | Bullets Over Broadway | 7 | 1 | 1 | | 1 | 1 |
| 1995 | Mighty Aphrodite | 2 | 1 | 1 | | 1 | 1 |
| 1996 | Everyone Says I Love You | | | | | 1 | |
| 1997 | Deconstructing Harry | 1 | | | | | |
| 1999 | Sweet and Lowdown | 2 | | | | 2 | |
| 2000 | Small Time Crooks | | | | | 1 | |
| 2005 | Match Point | 1 | | | | 4 | |
| 2008 | Vicky Cristina Barcelona | 1 | 1 | 1 | 1 | 4 | 1 |
| 2011 | Midnight in Paris | 4 | 1 | 1 | | 4 | 1 |
| 2013 | Blue Jasmine | 3 | 1 | 3 | 1 | 3 | 1 |
| Total | | 53 | 12 | 61 | 17 | 47 | 9 |

== Directed Academy Award performances ==
| Year | Performer | Film | Result |
|---|---|---|---|
Academy Award for Best Actor
| 1977 | Himself | Annie Hall | Nominated |
| 1999 | Sean Penn | Sweet and Lowdown | Nominated |
Academy Award for Best Actress
| 1977 | Diane Keaton | Annie Hall | Won |
| 1978 | Geraldine Page | Interiors | Nominated |
| 2013 | Cate Blanchett | Blue Jasmine | Won |
Academy Award for Best Supporting Actor
| 1986 | Michael Caine | Hannah and Her Sisters | Won |
| 1989 | Martin Landau | Crimes and Misdemeanors | Nominated |
| 1994 | Chazz Palminteri | Bullets Over Broadway | Nominated |
Academy Award for Best Supporting Actress
| 1978 | Maureen Stapleton | Interiors | Nominated |
| 1979 | Mariel Hemingway | Manhattan | Nominated |
| 1986 | Dianne Wiest | Hannah and Her Sisters | Won |
| 1992 | Judy Davis | Husbands and Wives | Nominated |
| 1994 | Jennifer Tilly | Bullets Over Broadway | Nominated |
| 1994 | Dianne Wiest | Bullets Over Broadway | Won |
| 1995 | Mira Sorvino | Mighty Aphrodite | Won |
| 1999 | Samantha Morton | Sweet and Lowdown | Nominated |
| 2008 | Penélope Cruz | Vicky Cristina Barcelona | Won |
| 2013 | Sally Hawkins | Blue Jasmine | Nominated |
