= Remember Pearl Harbor =

Remember Pearl Harbor may refer to:

- Remember Pearl Harbor (slogan), American popular saying coined after December 7, 1941, attack
- "Remember Pearl Harbor" (song), American patriotic march by Sammy Kaye written days after December 7, 1941
- Remember Pearl Harbor (film), 1942 American World War II patriotic adventure
