= Annie Hall =

1977 film by Woody Allen

- Theatrical release poster
- Directed by: Woody Allen
- Written by: Woody Allen; Marshall Brickman
- Produced by: Charles H. Joffe; Jack Rollins (uncredited)
- Starring: Woody Allen; Diane Keaton; Tony Roberts; Carol Kane; Paul Simon; Janet Margolin; Shelley Duvall; Christopher Walken; Colleen Dewhurst
- Cinematography: Gordon Willis
- Edited by: Ralph Rosenblum; Wendy Greene Bricmont
- Music by: See soundtrack
- Production company: A Jack Rollins and Charles H. Joffe Production
- Distributed by: United Artists
- Release dates: March 27, 1977 (Los Angeles Film Festival); April 20, 1977 (United States)
- Running time: 93 minutes
- Country: United States
- Language: English
- Budget: $4 million
- Box office: $44 million

Annie Hall is a 1977 American satirical romantic comedy-drama film directed by Woody Allen from a screenplay written by Allen and Marshall Brickman, and produced by Allen's manager, Charles H. Joffe. The film stars Allen as Alvy Singer, who tries to figure out the reasons for the failure of his relationship with the eponymous female lead, played by Diane Keaton in a role written specifically for her.

Principal photography for the film began on May 19, 1976, on the South Fork of Long Island, and continued periodically for the next ten months. Allen has described the result, which marked his first collaboration with cinematographer Gordon Willis, as "a major turning point", in that, unlike the farces and comedies that were his work to that point, it introduced a new level of seriousness. Academics have noted the contrast in the settings of New York City and Los Angeles, the stereotype of gender differences in sexuality, the presentation of Jewish identity, and the elements of psychoanalysis and modernism.

Annie Hall was screened at the Los Angeles Film Festival on March 27, 1977, before its official release in the United States on April 20, 1977. The film received widespread critical acclaim, and was nominated for the Big Five Academy Awards, winning four: the Academy Award for Best Picture, two for Allen (Best Director and, with Brickman, Best Original Screenplay), and Best Actress for Keaton. The film additionally won four BAFTA Awards, including Best Film, Best Direction (for Allen), Best Screenplay (for both Allen and Brickman) and Best Actress in a Leading Role (for Keaton), in addition to the Golden Globe Award for Best Actress – Motion Picture Comedy or Musical (for Keaton). The film's box office receipts in the United States and Canada of $38,251,425 are fourth-best of Allen's works when not adjusted for inflation.

Regarded among the greatest films ever made, it ranks 31st on AFI's list of the 100 greatest films in American cinema, 4th on their list of the greatest comedy films and 28th on Bravo's "100 Funniest Movies". Film critic Roger Ebert called it "just about everyone's favorite Woody Allen movie". The film's screenplay was also named the funniest ever written by the Writers Guild of America in its list of the "101 Funniest Screenplays". In 1992, the Library of Congress selected the film for preservation in the United States National Film Registry as being "culturally, historically or aesthetically significant". It is also regarded by critics as a landmark "transitional" film in Allen's career, moving his work from more "accessible" and surreal parody towards more "naturalistic" comic filmmaking.

== Plot ==
Comedian Alvy Singer is trying to understand why his relationship with Annie Hall ended a year earlier. Growing up in Brooklyn, he vexed his mother with impossible questions about the emptiness of existence, and was precocious about his innocent sexual curiosity, suddenly kissing a classmate at six years old and not understanding why she was not keen to reciprocate.

Annie and Alvy, waiting in a movie theater line to see The Sorrow and the Pity, overhear another man deriding the work of Federico Fellini and referencing Marshall McLuhan. Alvy imagines McLuhan himself stepping in at his invitation to criticize the man's comprehension of his work. That night, Annie shows no interest in sex with Alvy. Instead, they discuss his first wife, whom he devalued because of her interest in him. His second marriage was to a New York writer who did not share his enthusiasm for sports and was unable to reach orgasm.

With Annie, it is different. The two of them have fun cooking a meal of boiled lobster together. He teases her about the unusual men in her past. They had met playing tennis doubles with friends. Following the game, awkward small talk leads her to offer him a ride uptown, and then a glass of wine on her balcony. There, what seemed a mild exchange of trivial personal data is revealed in "mental subtitles" as an escalating flirtation. Their first date follows Annie's singing audition for a nightclub ("It Had to Be You"). After having sex that night, Alvy is "a wreck", while Annie relaxes with a joint.

Soon, Annie admits she loves Alvy, while he buys her books on death and says that his feelings for her are more than just love. When Annie moves in with him, things become very tense. Eventually, Alvy finds Annie arm-in-arm with one of her adult-education professors, and the two begin arguing over whether this is the "flexibility" they had discussed. They eventually break up, and he searches for the truth of relationships, asking strangers on the street about the nature of love, questioning his formative years, and imagining a cartoon version of himself arguing with a cartoon Annie portrayed as the Evil Queen in Snow White.

Alvy attempts a return to dating, but the effort is marred by neurosis and an underwhelming sexual encounter that is interrupted when Annie calls in the middle of the night, urging him to come over immediately to kill a spider in her bathroom. A reconciliation follows, coupled with a vow to stay together, come what may. However, their separate discussions with their therapists make it evident that there is an unspoken and unbridgeable divide. When Alvy accepts an offer to present an award on television, they travel to Los Angeles with Alvy's friend Rob. However, on the return trip, they agree that their relationship is not working. After losing Annie to her record producer, Tony Lacey, Alvy unsuccessfully tries to rekindle the flame with a marriage proposal. Back in New York, he stages a play of their relationship, but he changes the ending: now she accepts.

The last meeting between Annie and Alvy takes place on Manhattan's Upper West Side after they have both moved on to someone new. Alvy concludes that, although relationships are irrational, crazy, and absurd, people still need them.

== Cast ==
- Woody Allen as Alvy Singer
- Diane Keaton as Annie Hall
- Tony Roberts as Rob
- Carol Kane as Allison Portchnik
- Paul Simon as Tony Lacey
- Shelley Duvall as Pam
- Janet Margolin as Robin
- Colleen Dewhurst as Mrs. Hall
- Christopher Walken (Note: Misspelled as "Christopher Wlaken" in the closing credits.) as Duane Hall
- Donald Symington as Mr. Hall
- Mordecai Lawner as Alvy's father
- Joan Neuman as Alvy's mother
- Marshall McLuhan as himself
- Tracey Walter as actor in Rob's TV show

== Style and technique ==
Technically, the film marked an advance for the director. He selected Gordon Willis as his cinematographer—for Allen "a very important teacher" and a "technical wizard", saying, "I really count Annie Hall as the first step toward maturity in some way in making films". At the time, it was considered an "odd pairing" by many, Keaton among them. The director was known for his comedies and farces, while Willis was known as "the prince of darkness" for work on dramatic films like The Godfather (1972). Despite this, the two became friends during filming and continued the collaboration on several later films, including Zelig (1983), which earned Willis his first Academy Award nomination for Best Cinematography.

Willis described the production for the film as "relatively easy". He shot in varying styles; "hot golden light for California, grey overcast for Manhattan and a forties Hollywood glossy for ... dream sequences," most of which were cut. It was his suggestion which led Allen to film the dual therapy scenes in one set divided by a wall instead of the usual split screen method. He tried long takes, with some shots, unabridged, lasting an entire scene, which, for Roger Ebert, add to the dramatic power of the film: "Few viewers probably notice how much of Annie Hall consists of people talking, simply talking. They walk and talk, sit and talk, go to shrinks, go to lunch, make love and talk, talk to the camera, or launch into inspired monologues like Annie's free-association as she describes her family to Alvy. This speech by Diane Keaton is as close to perfect as such a speech can likely be ... all done in one take of brilliant brinksmanship." He cites a study that calculated the average shot length of Annie Hall to be 14.5 seconds, while other films made in 1977 had an average shot length of 4–7 seconds. Peter Cowie suggests that "Allen breaks up his extended shots with more orthodox cutting back and forth in conversation pieces so that the forward momentum of the film is sustained." Bernd Herzogenrath notes the innovation in the use of the split-screen during the dinner scene to powerfully exaggerate the contrast between the Jewish and the gentile family.

Although the film is not essentially experimental, at several points it undermines the narrative reality. James Bernardoni notes Allen's way of opening the film by facing the camera, which immediately intrudes upon audience involvement in the film. In one scene, Allen's character, in line to see a movie with Annie, listens to a man behind him deliver misinformed pontifications on the significance of Fellini's and Marshall McLuhan's work. Allen pulls McLuhan himself from just off-camera to correct the man's errors personally. Later in the film, when we see Annie and Alvy in their first extended talk, "mental subtitles" convey to the audience the characters' nervous inner doubts. An animated scene—with artwork based on the comic strip Inside Woody Allen—depicts Alvy and Annie in the guise of the Wicked Queen from Snow White. Although Allen uses each of these techniques only once, the "fourth wall" is broken several other times when characters address the camera directly. In one, Alvy stops several passers-by to ask questions about love, and in another, he shrugs off writing a happy ending to his relationship with Annie in his autobiographical first play as forgivable "wish-fulfillment". Allen chose to have Alvy break the fourth wall, he explained, "because I felt many of the people in the audience had the same feelings and the same problems. I wanted to talk to them directly and confront them."

== Production ==
=== Writing ===
The idea for what became Annie Hall was developed as Allen walked around New York City with co-writer Marshall Brickman. The pair discussed the project frequently, sometimes becoming frustrated and rejecting the idea. Allen wrote a first draft of a screenplay within a four-day period, sending it to Brickman to make alterations. According to Brickman, this draft centered on a man in his forties, someone whose life consisted "of several strands". One was a relationship with a young woman, another was a concern with the banality of the life that we all live, and a third an obsession with proving himself and testing himself to find out what kind of character he had. Allen himself turned forty in 1975, and Brickman suggests that "advancing age" and "worries about death" had influenced Allen's philosophical, personal approach to complement his "commercial side". Allen made the conscious decision to "sacrifice some of the laughs for a story about human beings". He recognized that for the first time he had the courage to abandon the safety of complete broad comedy and had the will to produce a film of deeper meaning which would be a nourishing experience for the audience. He was also influenced by Federico Fellini's comedy drama 8½ (1963), created at a similar personal turning point, and similarly colored by each director's psychoanalysis.

Brickman and Allen sent the screenplay back and forth until they were ready to ask United Artists for $4 million. Many elements from the early drafts did not survive. It was originally a drama centered on a murder mystery with a comic and romantic subplot. According to Allen, the murder occurred after a scene that remains in the film, the sequence in which Annie and Alvy miss the Ingmar Bergman film Face to Face (1976). Although they decided to drop the murder plot, Allen and Brickman made a murder mystery many years later: Manhattan Murder Mystery (1993), also starring Diane Keaton. The draft that Allen presented to the film's editor, Ralph Rosenblum, concluded with the words, "ending to be shot."

Allen suggested Anhedonia, a term for the inability to experience pleasure, as a working title, and Brickman suggested alternatives including It Had to Be Jew, Rollercoaster Named Desire and Me and My Goy. An advertising agency, hired by United Artists, embraced Allen's choice of an obscure word by suggesting the studio take out newspaper advertisements that looked like fake tabloid headlines such as "Anhedonia Strikes Cleveland!" However, Allen experimented with several titles over five test screenings, including Anxiety and Annie and Alvy, before settling on Annie Hall.

=== Casting ===
Several references in the film to Allen's own life have invited speculation that it is autobiographical. Both Alvy and Allen were comedians. His birthday appears on the blackboard in a school scene, and "Alvy" was one of Allen's childhood nicknames; certain features of his childhood are found in Alvy Singer's; Allen went to New York University and so did Alvy. Diane Keaton's real surname is "Hall" and "Annie" was her nickname, and she and Allen were once romantically involved. However, Allen is quick to dispel these suggestions. "The stuff that people insist is autobiographical is almost invariably not," Allen said. "It's so exaggerated that it's virtually meaningless to the people upon whom these little nuances are based. People got it into their heads that Annie Hall was autobiographical, and I couldn't convince them it wasn't". Contrary to various interviewers and commentators, he says, Alvy is not the character that is closest to himself; he identified more with the mother (Eve, played by Geraldine Page) in his next film, Interiors. Despite this, Keaton has stated that the relationship between Alvy and Annie was partly based on her relationship with the director.

The role of Annie Hall was written specifically for Keaton, who had worked with Allen on Play It Again, Sam (1972), Sleeper (1973) and Love and Death (1975). She considered the character an "affable version" of herself—both were "semi-articulate, dreamed of being a singer and suffered from insecurity"—and was surprised to win an Oscar for her performance. The film also marks the second film collaboration between Allen and Tony Roberts, their previous project being Play It Again, Sam.

Federico Fellini was Allen's first choice to appear in the cinema lobby scene because his films were under discussion, but Allen chose cultural academic Marshall McLuhan after both Fellini and Luis Buñuel declined the cameo. Some cast members, biographer John Baxter claims, were aggrieved at Allen's treatment of them. The director "acted coldly" towards McLuhan, who had to return from Canada for reshooting, and Mordecai Lawner, who played Alvy's father, claimed that Allen never spoke to him. However, during the production, Allen began a two-year relationship with Stacey Nelkin, who appears in a single scene.

=== Filming, editing and music ===
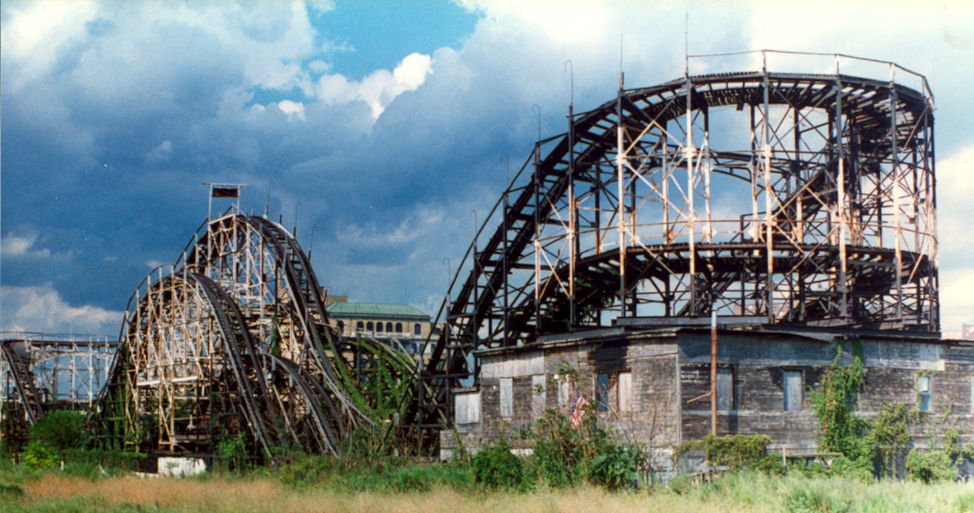
Woody Allen saw the Coney Island Thunderbolt when scouting locations and wrote it into the script as Alvy's childhood home.

Principal photography began on May 19, 1976, on the South Fork of Long Island with the scene in which Alvy and Annie boil live lobsters; filming continued periodically for the next ten months, and deviated frequently from the screenplay. There was nothing written about Alvy's childhood home lying under a roller coaster, but when Allen was scouting locations in Brooklyn with Willis and art director Mel Bourne, he "saw this roller-coaster, and ... saw the house under it. And I thought, we have to use this." Similarly, there is the incident where Alvy scatters a trove of cocaine with an accidental sneeze: although not in the script, the joke emerged from a rehearsal happenstance and stayed in the movie. In audience testing, this laugh was so sustained that a much longer pause had to be added so that the following dialogue was not lost.

Editor Ralph Rosenblum's first assembly of the film in 1976 left Brickman disappointed. "I felt that the film was running off in nine different directions", Brickman recalled. "It was like a first draft of a novel... from which two or three films could possibly be assembled." Rosenblum characterized the first cut, at two hours and twenty minutes, as "the surrealistic and abstract adventures of a neurotic Jewish comedian who was reliving his highly flawed life and in the process satirizing much of our culture... a visual monologue, a more sophisticated and more philosophical version of Take the Money and Run". Brickman found it "nondramatic and ultimately uninteresting, a kind of cerebral exercise." He suggested a more linear narrative.

The present-tense relationship between Alvy and Annie was not the narrative focus of this first cut, but Allen and Rosenblum recognized it as the dramatic spine, and began reworking the film "in the direction of that relationship". Rosenblum recalled that Allen "had no hesitation about trimming away much of the first twenty minutes in order to establish Keaton more quickly." According to Allen, "I didn't sit down with Marshall Brickman and say, 'We're going to write a picture about a relationship.' I mean the whole concept of the picture changed as we were cutting it."

As the film was budgeted for two weeks of post-production photography, late 1976 saw three separate shoots for the final segment, but only some of this material was used. The narration that ends the film, featuring the joke about 'we all need the eggs', was conceived and recorded only two hours before a test screening.

The credits call the film "A Jack Rollins and Charles H. Joffe Production"; the two men were Allen's managers and received this same credit on his films from 1969 to 1993. However, for this film, Joffe took producer credit and therefore received the Academy Award for Best Picture. The title sequence features a black background with white text in the Windsor Light Condensed typeface, a design that Allen used on his subsequent films. Stig Björkman sees some similarity to Bergman's simple and consistent title design, although Allen says that his own choice is a cost-saving device.

Very little background music is heard in the film, a departure for Allen influenced by Bergman. Diane Keaton performs twice in the jazz club: "It Had to be You" and "Seems Like Old Times" (the latter reprises in voiceover on the closing scene). The other exceptions include a boy's choir "Christmas Medley" played while the characters drive through Los Angeles, the Molto allegro from Mozart's Jupiter Symphony (heard as Annie and Alvy drive through the countryside), Tommy Dorsey's performance of "Sleepy Lagoon", and the anodyne cover of the Savoy Brown song "A Hard Way to Go" playing at a party in the mansion of Paul Simon's character.

== Soundtrack ==
- "Seems Like Old Times" (1945) – Music by Carmen Lombardo – Lyrics by John Jacob Loeb – Sung by Diane Keaton (uncredited) accompanied by Artie Butler (uncredited)
- "It Had to Be You" (1924) – Music by Isham Jones – Lyrics by Gus Kahn – Sung by Diane Keaton (uncredited) accompanied by Artie Butler (uncredited)
- "A Hard Way To Go" (1977) – Written and performed by Tim Weisberg
- "Christmas Medley" (Traditional Christmas songs: "We Wish You a Merry Christmas" (uncredited), "O, Christmas Tree" (uncredited) and "God Rest You Merry, Gentlemen" (uncredited)) – Lyrics by Ernst Anschütz – Performed by the Do-Re-Mi Children's Chorus
- "Sleepy Lagoon" (1930) – Composed by Eric Coates – Performed by Tommy Dorsey
- "Symphony No. 41 in C Major, K. 551, Molto Allegro" (1788) (uncredited) – Written by Wolfgang Amadeus Mozart

== Release ==
Annie Hall was shown at the Los Angeles Film Festival on March 27, 1977, before its official release in the United States on April 20, 1977. The film ultimately earned $38,251,425 ($203 million in 2025 dollars) in the United States and Canada against a $4-million budget, making it the 11th highest-grossing picture of 1977. In raw figures, it ranks as Allen's fourth-highest-grossing film in the United States, after Manhattan, Hannah and Her Sisters and Midnight in Paris; when adjusted for inflation, the gross figure makes it Allen's biggest box office hit. It played for over 100 consecutive weeks in London and grossed over $5.6 million in the United Kingdom. It was first released on Blu-ray on January 24, 2012, alongside Allen's film Manhattan (1979). Both releases include their original theatrical trailers.

== Reception ==
=== Critical response ===
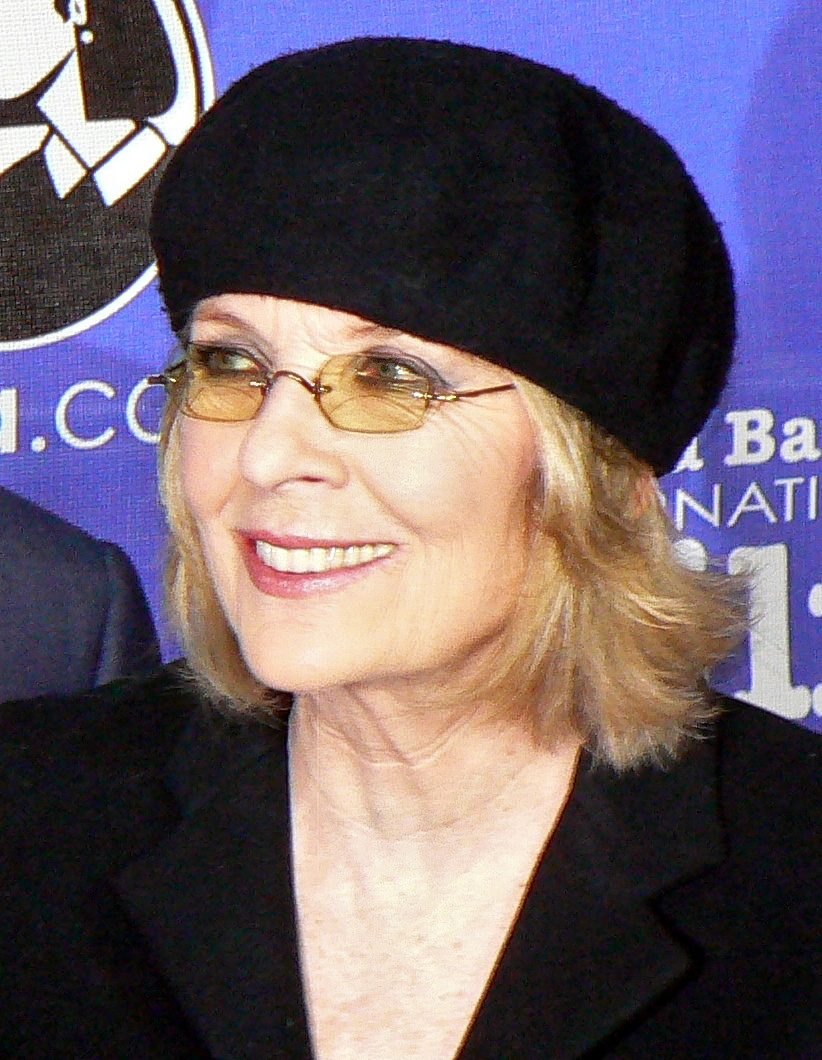
Diane Keaton pictured here age 66, received widespread critical acclaim and numerous accolades for her performance, including the Academy Award for Best Actress

Annie Hall met with widespread critical acclaim upon its release, with major praise directed towards the film's script and the performances of Allen and Keaton.

Tim Radford of The Guardian called the film "Allen's most closely focused and daring film to date". The New York Times' Vincent Canby preferred Annie Hall to Allen's second directorial effort, Take the Money and Run, since the former is more "humane" while the latter is more a "cartoon". Several critics have compared the film favorably to Bergman's Scenes from a Marriage (1973), including Joseph McBride in Variety, who found it Allen's "most three-dimensional film to date" with an ambition equal to Bergman's best even as the co-stars become the "contemporary equivalent of ... Tracy-Hepburn."

More critically, Peter Cowie commented that the film "suffers from its profusion of cultural references and asides". Writing for New York magazine, John Simon called the film "unfunny comedy, poor moviemaking, and embarrassing self-revelation", and wrote that Keaton's performance was "in bad taste to watch and indecency to display", saying that the part should have been played by Robin Mary Paris, the actress who appears briefly in the scene where Alvy Singer has written a two-character play nakedly based on himself and Annie Hall. Simon's review of Annie Hall concluded: "It is a film so shapeless, sprawling, repetitious, and aimless as to seem to beg for oblivion. At this, it is successful."

The film has continued to receive positive reviews. In his 2002 lookback, Roger Ebert added it to his Great Movies list and commented with surprise that the film had "an instant familiarity" despite its age, and Slant writer Jaime N. Christley found the one-liners "still gut-busting after 35 years". A later Guardian critic, Peter Bradshaw, named it the best comedy film of all time, commenting that "this wonderfully funny, unbearably sad film is a miracle of comic writing and inspired film-making". John Marriott of the Radio Times believed that Annie Hall was the film where Allen "found his own singular voice, a voice that echoes across events with a mixture of exuberance and introspection", referring to the "comic delight" derived from the "spirited playing of Diane Keaton as the kooky innocent from the Midwest, and Woody himself as the fumbling New York neurotic". Empire magazine rated the movie five out of five stars, calling it a "classic". In 2017, Claire Dederer wrote, "Annie Hall is the greatest comic film of the twentieth century [...] because it acknowledges the irrepressible nihilism that lurks at the center of all comedy."

The Japanese filmmaker Akira Kurosawa cited Annie Hall as one of his favorite films.

On review aggregator Rotten Tomatoes, the film has a rating of 97% based on 130 reviews, with an average rating of 9.30/10. The site's critical consensus reads, "Filled with poignant performances and devastating humor, Annie Hall represents a quantum leap for Woody Allen and remains an American classic." Metacritic gave the film a score of 92 out of 100 based on 20 critical reviews, indicating "universal acclaim".

=== Critical analysis ===
==== Love and sexuality ====
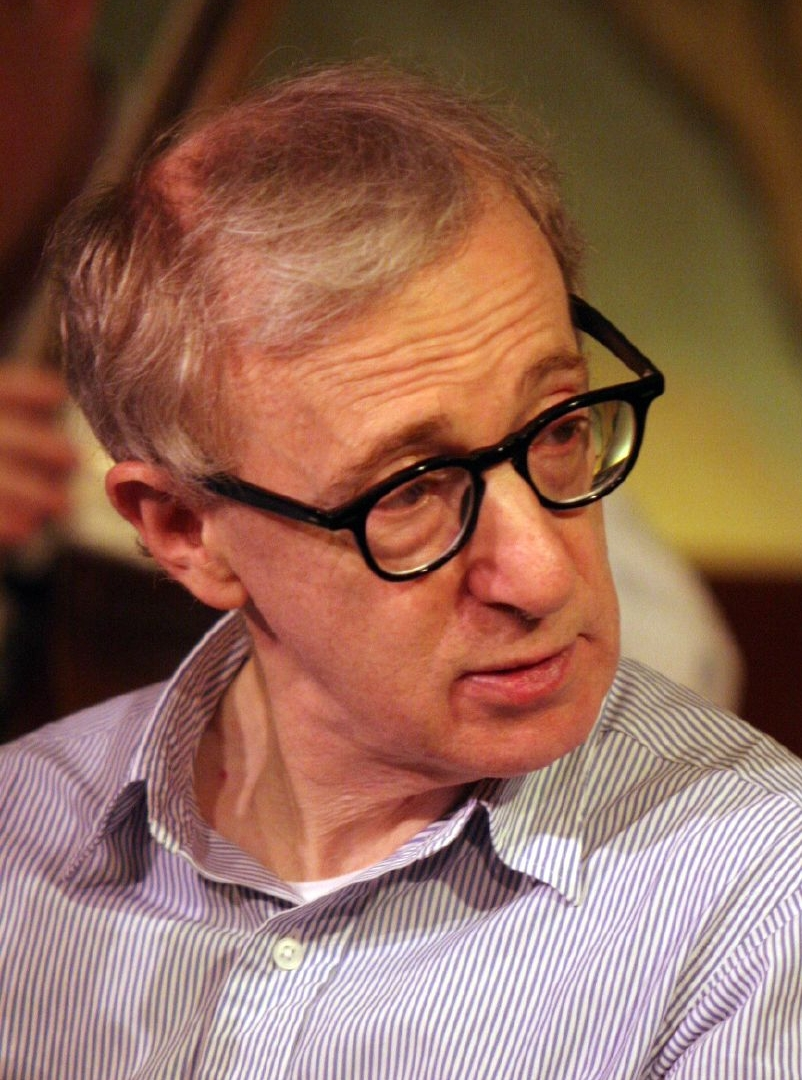
Woody Allen in New York City in 2006

Sociologists Virginia Rutter and Pepper Schwartz consider Alvy and Annie's relationship to be a stereotype of gender differences in sexuality. The nature of love is a repeating subject for Allen and co-star Tony Roberts described this film as "the story of everybody who falls in love, and then falls out of love and goes on." Alvy searches for love's purpose through his effort to get over his depression about the demise of his relationship with Annie. Sometimes he sifts through his memories of the relationship, at another point he stops people on the sidewalk, with one woman saying that "It's never something you do. That's how people are. Love fades", a suggestion that it was no one's fault, they just grew apart and the end was inevitable. By the end of the film, Alvy accepts this and decides that love is ultimately "irrational and crazy and absurd", but a necessity of life. Christopher Knight believes Alvy's quest upon meeting Annie is carnal, whereas hers is on an emotional note.

Richard Brody of The New Yorker notes the film's "Eurocentric art-house self-awareness" and Alvy Singer's "psychoanalytic obsession in baring his sexual desires and frustrations, romantic disasters, and neurotic inhibitions".

==== Jewish identity ====
Singer is identified with the stereotypical neurotic Jewish male, and the differences between Alvy and Annie are often related to the perceptions and realities of Jewish identity. Vincent Brook notes that "Alvy dines with the WASP-y Hall family and imagines that they must see him as a Hasidic Jew, complete with payot (ear locks) and a large black hat." Robert M. Seltzer and Norman J. Cohen highlight the scene in which Annie remarks that Annie's grandmother "hates Jews. She thinks they just make money, but she's the one. Is she ever, I'm telling you.", revealing the hypocrisy in her grandmother's stereotypical American view of Jews by arguing that "no stigma attaches to the love of money in America". Bernd Herzogenrath also considers Allen's joke, "I would like to but we need the eggs", to the doctor at the end when he suggests putting him in a mental institution, to be a paradox of not only the persona of the urban neurotic Jew but also of the film itself.

==== Woody Allen persona ====
Christopher Knight points out that Annie Hall is framed through Alvy's experiences. "Generally, what we know about Annie and about the relationship comes filtered through Alvy, an intrusive narrator capable of halting the narrative and stepping out from it in order to entreat the audience's interpretative favor." He suggests that because Allen's films blur the protagonist with "past and future protagonists as well as with the director himself", it "makes a difference as to whether we are most responsive to the director's or the character's framing of events". Despite the narrative's framing, "the joke is on Alvy." Emanuel Levy believes that Alvy Singer became synonymous with the public perception of Woody Allen in the United States. Annie Hall is viewed as the definitive Woody Allen film in displaying neurotic humor.

==== Location ====
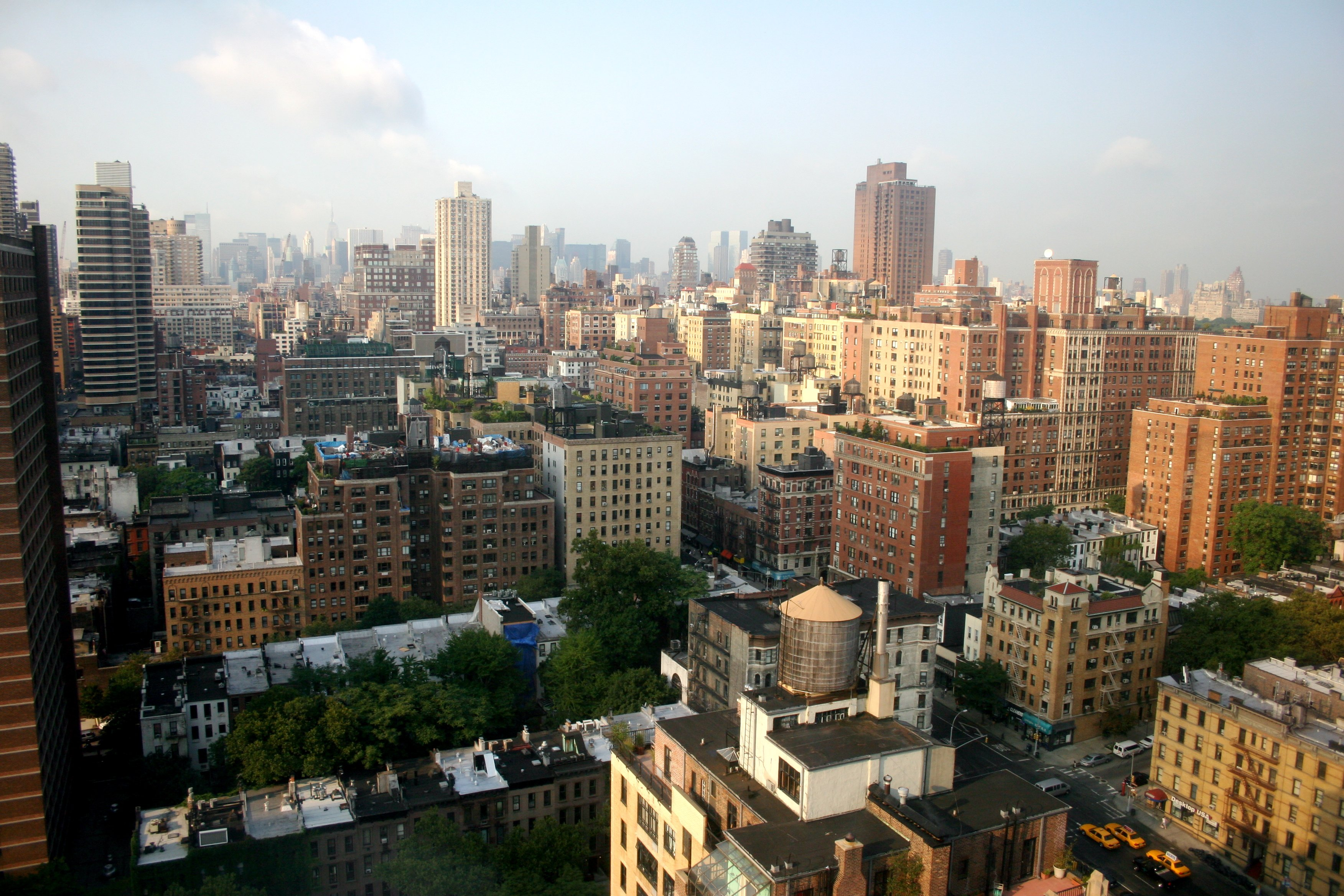
Upper East Side of New York City

Annie Hall "is as much a love song to New York City as it is to the character," reflecting Allen's adoration of the island of Manhattan. It was a relationship he explored repeatedly, particularly in films like Manhattan (1979) and Hannah and Her Sisters (1986). Annie Hall's apartment, which still exists on East 70th Street between Lexington Avenue and Park Avenue, is by Allen's own confession his favorite block in the city. Peter Cowie argues that the film shows "a romanticized view" of the borough, with the camera "linger[ing] on the Upper East Side [... and where] the fear of crime does not trouble its characters." By contrast, California is presented less positively, and David Halle notes the obvious "invidious intellectual comparison" between New York City and Los Angeles. While Manhattan's movie theaters show classic and foreign films, Los Angeles theaters run less-prestigious fare such as The House of Exorcism and Messiah of Evil. Rob's demonstration of adding canned laughter to television demonstrates the "cynical artifice of the medium". New York City serves as a symbol of Alvy's personality ("gloomy, claustrophobic, and socially cold, but also an intellectual haven full of nervous energy") while Los Angeles is a symbol of freedom for Annie.

==== Psychoanalysis and modernism ====
Annie Hall has been cited as a film which uses both therapy and analysis for comic effect. Sam B. Girgus considers Annie Hall to be a story about memory and retrospection, which "dramatizes a return via narrative desire to the repressed and the unconscious in a manner similar to psychoanalysis". He argues that the film constitutes a self-conscious assertion of how narrative desire and humor interact in the film to reform ideas and perceptions and that Allen's deployment of Freudian concepts and humor forms a "pattern of skepticism toward surface meaning that compels further interpretation". Girgus believes that proof of the pervasiveness of Sigmund Freud in the film is demonstrated at the beginning through a reference to a joke in Jokes and Their Relation to the Unconscious, and makes another joke about a psychiatrist and patient, which Girgus argues is also symbolic of the dynamic between humor and the unconscious in the film. Further Freudian concepts are later addressed in the film with Annie's recall of a dream to her psychoanalyst in which Frank Sinatra is smothering her with a pillow, which alludes to Freud's belief in dreams as "visual representations of words or ideas".

Peter Bailey in his book The Reluctant Film Art of Woody Allen, argues that Alvy displays a "genial denigration of art" which contains a "significant equivocation", in that in his self-deprecation he invites the audience to believe that he is leveling with them. Bailey argues that Allen's devices in the film, including the subtitles which reveal Annie's and Alvy's thoughts "extend and reinforce Annie Hall's winsome ethos of plain-dealing and ingenuousness". He muses that the film is full of antimimetic emblems such as McLuhan's magical appearance which provide quirky humor and that the "disparity between mental projections of reality and actuality" drives the film. His view is that self-reflective cinematic devices intelligently dramatize the difference between surface and substance, with visual emblems "incessantly distilling the distinction between the world mentally constructed and reality".

In his discussion of the film's relation to modernism, Thomas Schatz finds the film an unresolved "examination of the process of human interaction and interpersonal communication" and "immediately establishes [a] self-referential stance" that invites the spectator "to read the narrative as something other than a sequential development toward some transcendent truth". For him, Alvy "is the victim of a tendency toward overdetermination of meaning – or in modernist terms 'the tyranny of the signified' – and his involvement with Annie can be viewed as an attempt to establish a spontaneous, intellectually unencumbered relationship, an attempt which is doomed to failure."

== Accolades and recognition ==
Academy Awards
1. Best Picture, Charles H. Joffe
2. Best Director, Woody Allen
3. Best Actress, Diane Keaton
4. Best Original Screenplay, Woody Allen and Marshall Brickman
Golden Globe Awards
1. Best Actress in a Motion Picture Musical or Comedy, Diane Keaton
BAFTA Awards
1. Best Film
2. Best Direction, Woody Allen
3. Best Actress in a Leading Role, Diane Keaton
4. Best Screenplay, Woody Allen and Marshall Brickman
5. Best Editing, Ralph Rosenblum and Wendy Greene Bricmont

Annie Hall won four Oscars at the 50th Academy Awards on April 3, 1978, and was nominated for five (the Big Five) in total. Producer Charles H. Joffe received the statue for Best Picture, Allen for Best Director and, with Brickman, for Best Original Screenplay, and Keaton for Best Actress. Allen was also nominated for Best Actor. Many had expected Star Wars to win the major awards, including Brickman and executive producer Robert Greenhut.

The film was also honored five times at the BAFTA awards. Along with the top award for Best Film and the award for Best Editing, Keaton won for Best Actress, Allen won for Best Direction and Best Original Screenplay alongside Brickman. The film received one Golden Globe Award, for Best Actress – Motion Picture Comedy or Musical (Keaton), in addition to four nominations: Best Motion Picture – Musical or Comedy, Best Director, Best Screenplay and Best Actor – Motion Picture Musical or Comedy (the latter three for Allen).

In 1992, the United States' Library of Congress selected the film for preservation in its National Film Registry that includes "culturally, historically, or aesthetically significant" films. The film is often mentioned among the greatest comedies of all time. The American Film Institute lists it 31st in American cinema history. In 2000, they named it second greatest romantic comedy in American cinema. Keaton's performance of "Seems Like Old Times" was ranked 90th on their list of greatest songs included in a film, and her line "La-dee-da, la-dee-da." was named the 55th greatest movie quote. In 2006, the screenplay was named the sixth greatest screenplay by the Writers Guild of America, West while IGN named it the seventh greatest comedy film of all time. In 2000, readers of Total Film magazine voted it the forty-second greatest comedy film of all time, and the seventh greatest romantic comedy film of all time. Several lists ranking Allen's best films have put Annie Hall among his greatest work.

In June 2008, AFI revealed its 10 Top 10—the best ten films in ten classic American film genres—after polling over 1,500 people from the creative community and Annie Hall was placed second in the romantic comedy genre. AFI also ranked Annie Hall on several other lists. In November 2008, Annie Hall was voted in at No. 68 on Empire magazine's list of The 500 Greatest Movies of All Time. It is also ranked No. 2 on Rotten Tomatoes' 25 Best Romantic Comedies, second only to The Philadelphia Story. In 2010, the film was listed as the greatest comedy film of all time by The Guardian.

In 2012, the film was listed as the 127th best film of all time by the Sight & Sound critics' poll. The film was also named the 132nd best film by the Sight & Sound directors' poll. In 2022, it dropped to 243rd in the main poll, tied with 21 other films. It did not appear in the top 100 films in that year's directors' poll.

In October 2013, the film was voted by the Guardian readers as the second best film directed by Woody Allen. In November 2015, the film was named the funniest screenplay by the Writers Guild of America in its list of 101 Funniest Screenplays.

=== American Film Institute recognition ===
The film is recognized by American Film Institute in these lists:

- 1998: AFI's 100 Years...100 Movies – #31
- 2000: AFI's 100 Years...100 Laughs – #4
- 2002: AFI's 100 Years...100 Passions – #11
- 2004: AFI's 100 Years...100 Songs:
  - "Seems Like Old Times" – #90
- 2005: AFI's 100 Years...100 Movie Quotes:
  - Annie Hall: "La-dee-da, la-dee-da." – #55
- 2007: AFI's 100 Years...100 Movies (10th Anniversary Edition) – #35
- 2008: AFI's 10 Top 10:
  - No. 2 Romantic Comedy Film

1992 – National Film Registry.

In 2006, Premiere magazine ranked Keaton in Annie Hall as 60th in its list of the "100 Greatest Performances of All Time", and noted:

It's hard to play ditzy. ... The genius of Annie is that despite her loopy backhand, awful driving, and nervous tics, she's also a complicated, intelligent woman. Keaton brilliantly displays this dichotomy of her character, especially when she yammers away on a first date with Alvy (Woody Allen), while the subtitle reads, "He probably thinks I'm a yoyo." Yo-yo? Hardly.

=== Legacy and influence ===
Diane Keaton's dress style as Annie Hall; an influence on the fashion world during the late 1970s

Although the film received widespread critical acclaim and numerous awards, Allen himself was disappointed with it, and said in an interview, "When Annie Hall started out, that film was not supposed to be what I wound up with. The film was supposed to be what happens in a guy's mind ... Nobody understood anything that went on. The relationship between myself and Diane Keaton was all anyone cared about. That was not what I cared about ... In the end, I had to reduce the film to just me and Diane Keaton, and that relationship, so I was quite disappointed in that movie". Allen has repeatedly declined to make a sequel, and in a 1992 interview stated that "Sequelism has become an annoying thing. I don't think Francis Coppola should have done Godfather III because Godfather II was quite great. When they make a sequel, it's just a thirst for more money, so I don't like that idea so much".

Diane Keaton has stated that Annie Hall was her favorite role and that the film meant everything to her. When asked if being most associated with the role concerned her as an actress, she replied, "I'm not haunted by Annie Hall. I'm happy to be Annie Hall. If somebody wants to see me that way, it's fine by me". Costume designer Ruth Morley, working with Keaton, created a look which had an influence on the fashion world during the late-70s, with women adopting the style: layering oversized, mannish blazers over vests, billowy trousers or long skirts, a man's tie, and boots. The look was often referred to as the "Annie Hall look". Some sources suggest that Keaton herself was mainly responsible for the look, and Ralph Lauren has often claimed credit, but only one jacket and one tie were purchased from Ralph Lauren for use in the film. Morley and Keaton may have been aware that an oversized menswear look for women was popular in Paris at about the same time, inspired by designer Kenzo, who had been responsible for a move toward oversized clothes in the high-fashion world a few years earlier; the esthetic was in the air at the time. Allen recalled that Lauren and Keaton's dress style almost did not end up in the film. "She came in," he recalled in 1992, "and the costume lady on Annie Hall said, 'Tell her not to wear that. She can't wear that. It's so crazy.' And I said, 'Leave her. She's a genius. Let's just leave her alone, let her wear what she wants.'"

The film's script topped the Writers Guild of America's list of 101 funniest screenplays ever, surpassing Some Like It Hot (1959), Groundhog Day (1993), Airplane! (1980), and Tootsie (1982). James Bernardoni states that the film is "one of the very few romantic comedy-dramas of the New Hollywood era and one that has rightly taken its place among the classics of that revered genre", likening the seriocomic meditation on the couple relationship to George Cukor's Adam's Rib (1949), starring Katharine Hepburn and Spencer Tracy. Since its release, other romantic comedies have inspired comparison. When Harry Met Sally... (1989), Chasing Amy (1997), Burning Annie (2007), 500 Days of Summer (2009) and Allen's 2003 film, Anything Else, are among them, while film director Rian Johnson said in an interview for the book, The Film That Changed My Life, that Annie Hall inspired him to become a film director. Karen Gillan stated that she watched Annie Hall as part of her research for her lead role in Not Another Happy Ending. In 2018, Matt Starr and Ellie Sachs released a short film remake starring senior citizens.

== See also ==
- List of cult films

== Bibliography ==
- Bailey, Peter J. (2001). The Reluctant Film Art of Woody Allen. University Press of Kentucky. ISBN 0-8131-9041-X. Archived from the original on June 29, 2014.
- Baxter, John (1999). Woody Allen: A Biography (Revised paperback ed.). London: Harper Collins. ISBN 0-00-638794-2.
- Bernardoni, James (January 1, 2001). The New Hollywood: What the Movies Did with the New Freedoms of the Seventies. McFarland. ISBN 978-0-7864-1206-8. Archived from the original on June 29, 2014.
- Björkman, Stig (1995) [1993]. Woody Allen on Woody Allen. London: Faber and Faber. ISBN 0-571-17335-7.
- Brook, Vincent (2006). You Should See Yourself: Jewish Identity in Postmodern Jewish Culture. New Brunswick, NJ: Rutgers University Press.
- Cowie, Peter (1996). Annie Hall. London: British Film Institute. ISBN 0-85170-580-4.
- Eagan, Daniel (2010). America's Film Legacy: The Authoritative Guide to the Landmark Movies in the National Film Registry. London: Continuum International Publishing Group. ISBN 978-0-8264-1849-4. Archived from the original on April 23, 2017.
- Girgus, Sam B. (1993). "Philip Roth and Woody Allen: Freud and the Humor of the Repressed". In Ziv, Avner; Zajdman, Anat (eds.). Semites and stereotypes: characteristics of Jewish humor. Greenwood Publishing Group. ISBN 0-313-26135-0.
- Girgus, Sam B. (November 18, 2002). The Films of Woody Allen. Cambridge University Press. ISBN 978-0-521-00929-4. Archived from the original on June 29, 2014.
- Halle, David (August 15, 2003). New York and Los Angeles: Politics, Society, and Culture--A Comparative View. University of Chicago Press. ISBN 978-0-226-31369-6. Archived from the original on June 29, 2014.
- Harvey, Adam (March 6, 2007). The Soundtracks of Woody Allen: A Complete Guide to the Songs and Music in Every Film, 1969-2005. McFarland. ISBN 978-0-7864-2968-4. Archived from the original on June 29, 2014.
- Herzogenrath, Bernd (May 20, 2009). The Films of Edgar G. Ulmer. Scarecrow Press. ISBN 978-0-8108-6736-9. Archived from the original on June 29, 2014.
- Johnson, Rian (2011). "Annie Hall (Interview by Robert K. Elder.)". In Elder, Robert K. (ed.). The Film That Changed My Life. Chicago: Chicago Review Press. pp. 13–24. ISBN 978-1-55652-825-5.
- Knight, Christopher J (2004). "Woody Allen's Annie Hall: Galatea's Triumph Over Pygmalion". Literature/Film Quarterly. 32 (3): 213–221.
- Lax, Eric (2000). Woody Allen: A Biography (New ed.). Da Capo Press. ISBN 0-306-80985-0.
- Mitchell, Deborah C. (July 26, 2001). Diane Keaton: Artist and Icon. McFarland. ISBN 978-0-7864-1082-8. Archived from the original on June 29, 2014.
- Meyers, Joseph (2008). Inside New York 2009. Inside New York. ISBN 978-1-892768-41-4. Archived from the original on June 29, 2014.
- Pennington, Jody W. (2007). The History of Sex in American Film. Greenwood Publishing Group. ISBN 978-0-275-99226-2. Archived from the original on June 30, 2014.
- Rosenblum, Ralph; Karen, Robert (1986). When the Shooting Stops ... The Cutting Begins. DaCapo Press. ISBN 0-306-80272-4.
- Rutter, Virginia; Schwartz, Pepper (2012). The Gender of Sexuality: Exploring Sexual Possibilities. Rowman & Littlefield. ISBN 978-0-7425-7003-0. Archived from the original on June 29, 2014.
- Schatz, Thomas (1982). "Annie Hall and the Issue of Modernism". Literature/Film Quarterly. 10 (3): 180–187.
- Seltzer, Robert M.; Cohen, Norman J. (1995). The Americanization of the Jews. NYU Press. ISBN 978-0-8147-8001-5. Archived from the original on June 29, 2014.
- Spignesi, Stephen J. (1992). The Woody Allen Companion. London: Plexus Publishing. ISBN 0-85965-205-X.
- Steele, Valerie (November 15, 2010). The Berg Companion to Fashion. Berg. p. 336. ISBN 9781847885920. Archived from the original on July 26, 2020.
- Tueth, Michael (2012). Reeling with Laughter: American Film Comedies—from Anarchy to Mockumentary. Scarecrow Press. ISBN 978-0-8108-8367-3. Archived from the original on June 29, 2014.
