= Why Would I Lie? =

1980 film directed by Larry Peerce

- Original theatrical poster
- Directed by: Larry Peerce
- Screenplay by: Peter Stone
- Based on: The Fabricator by Hollis Hodges
- Produced by: Pancho Kohner
- Starring: Treat Williams; Lisa Eichhorn; Gabriel Macht; Susan Heldfond; Anne Byrne; Valerie Curtin; Jocelyn Brando; Nicolas Coster; Severn Darden; Sonny Davis
- Cinematography: Gerald Hirschfeld
- Edited by: John C. Howard
- Music by: Charles Fox
- Production company: Metro-Goldwyn-Mayer
- Distributed by: United Artists (United States/Canada); Cinema International Corporation (International)
- Release date: August 10, 1980
- Running time: 105 minutes
- Country: United States
- Language: English
- Budget: $4.5 million
- Box office: $1,175,855

Why Would I Lie? is a 1980 American comedy-drama film about a compulsive liar named Cletus (Treat Williams). The film, which was directed by Larry Peerce and shot in Spokane, Washington, is based on the novel The Fabricator by Hollis Hodges.

== Plot ==
Cletus Hayworth, a compulsive liar, is employed as a social worker. He tries to find a home for a young boy named Jorge and, in so doing, falls in love with a social worker, who unbeknownst to everyone is Jorge's mother.

== Cast ==
- Treat Williams as Cletus Hayworth
- Lisa Eichhorn as Kay Lindsey
- Gabriel Macht as Jorge
- Susan Heldfond as Amy Grower
- Anne Byrne as Faith Hayworth
- Valerie Curtin as Mrs. Bok
- Jocelyn Brando as Mrs. Crumpe
- Nicolas Coster as Walter Hayworth
- Severn Darden as Dr. Ed Barbour
- Sonny Davis as Paul Hayworth
- Jane Burkett as Natalie
- Kay Cummings as Edith
- Mia Bendixsen as Thelma
- Ilene Kristen as Waitress
- Harriett Gibson as Mary Kalinsky
- Cynthia Hoppenfeld as Opel McCarthy
- Mitzi Hoag as Mrs. Hayworth
- Natalie Core as Mrs. Gogle
- Shirley Slater as Warden
- Jan D'Arcy as Card Player
- Marian Gants as Card Player

== Reception ==
Janet Maslin of The New York Times was not impressed: "It takes about three-quarters of an hour to figure out where Why Would I Lie? is going, and by that time it's clear the movie won't get there. ...First seen on his psychiatrist's couch, where he sports an antique coal miner's helmet, Cletus appears to be a cute, troubled guy in the Morgan! mold. It never becomes clear quite what he is, though. And before the audience even has time to get used to him, he has become involved in a convoluted plot that probably worked better on the page than it does on the screen. ...As directed by Larry Peerce, Why Would I Lie? isn't often funny, especially since Cletus's tall tales generally have a macabre ring. ...Mr. Williams can be charming, but he has none of the whimsical nature that might make Cletus's exploits believable."

== Awards ==
- Nominee Best Comedy Picture - Young Artist Award
- Nominee Best Young Actor - Young Artist Award (Gabriel Macht)
