= Leslie Bloom =

American art director

- Occupation: Art director
- Years active: 1971 - present

Leslie Bloom is an American art director. She was nominated for an Academy Award in the category of Best Art Direction for the films The Cotton Club and Radio Days.

== Selected filmography ==
- The Cotton Club (1984)
- Radio Days (1987)
