= Hannah and Her Sisters =

1986 film by Woody Allen

- Theatrical release poster
- Directed by: Woody Allen
- Written by: Woody Allen
- Produced by: Robert Greenhut
- Starring: Woody Allen; Michael Caine; Mia Farrow; Carrie Fisher; Barbara Hershey; Lloyd Nolan; Maureen O'Sullivan; Daniel Stern; Max von Sydow; Dianne Wiest
- Cinematography: Carlo Di Palma
- Edited by: Susan E. Morse
- Production company: A Jack Rollins and Charles H. Joffe Production
- Distributed by: Orion Pictures
- Release dates: January 25, 1986 (US Film Festival); February 7, 1986 (United States)
- Running time: 106 minutes
- Country: United States
- Language: English
- Budget: $6.4 million
- Box office: $40.1 million

Hannah and Her Sisters is a 1986 American comedy-drama film written and directed by Woody Allen. It tells the intertwined stories of an extended family over two years that begins and ends with a family Thanksgiving dinner. Allen also stars in the film, along with Mia Farrow as Hannah, Michael Caine as her husband, and Barbara Hershey and Dianne Wiest as her sisters. Alongside them, the film features Carrie Fisher, Lloyd Nolan (who died four months before the film's release), Maureen O'Sullivan, Max von Sydow, Daniel Stern, John Turturro, Lewis Black (in his film debut), and Julie Kavner.

Hannah and Her Sisters grossed $40 million in North America, making it Allen's highest-grossing film until it was surpassed by Midnight in Paris in 2011. The film won Academy Awards for Best Original Screenplay (for Allen), Best Supporting Actor (for Caine), and Best Supporting Actress (for Wiest). It is often considered one of Allen's major works, with critics continuing to praise its writing and ensemble cast.

== Plot ==
The story is told in three main story arcs, with most of it occurring during a 24-month period beginning and ending at Thanksgiving parties, held at The Langham, hosted by Hannah and her husband, Elliot. Hannah, a renowned actress who now focuses mainly on her family, serves as the stalwart hub of the narrative; most of the events of the film connect to her.

Elliot becomes infatuated with Hannah's sister Lee, and eventually begins an affair with her. Elliot attributes his behavior to his discontent with his wife's self-sufficiency and resentment of her emotional strength. Lee has lived for five years with a reclusive artist, Frederick, who is much older. She finds her relationship with Frederick no longer intellectually or sexually stimulating, in spite of (or maybe because of) Frederick's professed interest in continuing to teach her. She leaves Frederick after admitting she has been seeing someone else. For the remainder of the year between the first and second Thanksgiving gatherings, Elliot and Lee carry on their affair despite Elliot's inability to end his marriage to Hannah. Lee finally ends the affair during the second Thanksgiving, explaining that she is finished waiting for him to commit and has started dating someone else. Soon afterwards Elliot argues with Hannah who suspects he is having an affair but the two reconcile that evening.

Hannah's ex-husband Mickey, a television writer, is present mostly in scenes outside of the primary story. Flashbacks reveal that his marriage to Hannah fell apart after they were unable to have children because of his infertility (although they had twins through sperm donation from his business partner before divorcing). He also went on a disastrous date with Hannah's sister Holly, when they were set up by Hannah after the divorce. A hypochondriac, he goes to his doctor complaining of hearing loss and is frightened by the possibility that he might have a brain tumor. When tests prove that he is perfectly healthy, he is initially overjoyed but almost immediately afterwards despairs that life is meaningless. His existential crisis leads to unsatisfying experiments with religious conversion to Catholicism and a brief interest in Krishna Consciousness. Ultimately, a suicide attempt leads him to find meaning in his life after unexpectedly viewing the Marx Brothers' Duck Soup in a movie theater. The revelation that life should be enjoyed rather than understood leads to a second date with Holly, which this time blossoms into love.

Holly's story is the film's third main arc. A former cocaine addict, she is an unsuccessful actress who cannot settle on a career. After borrowing money from Hannah, she starts a catering business with April, a friend and fellow actress. Holly and April end up as rivals in auditions for parts in Broadway musicals, as well as for the affections of an architect, David. Holly abandons the catering business after David rejects her in favor of April and decides to try her hand at writing. The career change forces her once again to borrow money from Hannah, a dependency that Holly resents. She writes a script inspired by Hannah and Elliot, which greatly upsets Hannah. Holly sets aside her script, and instead writes a story inspired by her own life, which Mickey reads and admires greatly, vowing to help her get it produced and leading to their second date.

A minor arc in the film tells part of the story of Norma and Evan. They are the parents of Hannah and her sisters, and still have acting careers of their own. Their own tumultuous marriage revolves around Norma's alcoholism and the alleged affairs of both of them, but the long-term bond between them is evident in Evan's flirtatious anecdotes about Norma while playing piano at the Thanksgiving gatherings.

By the time of the film's third Thanksgiving, Lee has married a literature professor she met while taking random classes at Columbia University. Hannah and Elliot have reconciled their marriage, and Hannah has a role in a television production of Othello. The film's final shot reveals that Holly is married to Mickey and is pregnant.

== Cast ==
(in order of appearance)

- Barbara Hershey as Lee
- Carrie Fisher as April
- Michael Caine as Elliot
- Mia Farrow as Hannah
- Dianne Wiest as Holly
- Maureen O'Sullivan as Norma
- Lloyd Nolan as Evan
- Max von Sydow as Frederick
- Woody Allen as Mickey
- Lewis Black as Paul
- Julia Louis-Dreyfus as Mary
- Christian Clemenson as Larry
- Julie Kavner as Gail
- J.T. Walsh as Ed Smythe
- John Turturro as Writer
- Rusty Magee as Ron
- Richard Jenkins as Dr. Wilkes
- Fred Melamed as Dr. Grey
- Benno Schmidt as Dr. Smith
- Joanna Gleason as Carol
- Maria Chiara as Manon Lescaut
- Daniel Stern as Dusty
- Stephen DeFluiter as Dr. Brooks
- The 39 Steps as Rock Band
- Bobby Short as Himself
- Beverly Peer as Bass Player
- Daisy Previn and Moses Farrow as Hannah's Children
- Bernie Leighton as Audition Pianist
- John Doumanian and Fletcher Previn as Thanksgiving Guests

Uncredited (in order of appearance)
Tony Roberts	Norman, Mickey's former partner in writing sitcoms
Sam Waterston	David, the architect who points out to April and Holly his favorite buildings
Soon-Yi Previn	Thanksgiving guest

== Influences ==
Part of the film's structure and background is borrowed from Ingmar Bergman's Fanny and Alexander (1982). In both films, a large theatrical family gather for three successive years' celebrations (Thanksgiving in Allen's film, Christmas in Bergman's). The first of each gathering is in a time of contentment, the second in a time of trouble, and the third showing what happens after the resolution of the troubles. The sudden appearance of Mickey's reflection behind Holly's in the closing scene also parallels the apparition behind Alexander of the Bishop's ghost. Additional parallels can be found with Luchino Visconti's 1960 film Rocco and His Brothers, which, besides the connection to its name, also uses the structural device of dividing sections of the film for the different siblings' plot arcs.

== Production ==
The film was originally about a man who fell in love with his wife's sister. Woody Allen then re-read the novel Anna Karenina "and I thought, it's interesting how this guy gets the various stories going, cutting from one story to another. I loved the idea of experimenting with that."

He was particularly intrigued by the character of Nicholas Levin "who can't seem to find any meaning to life, he's terribly afraid of dying. It struck home very deeply. I thought it would be interesting to do one story about the relationship between three sisters and one story about someone else and his obsession with mortality."

Allen admits the role of Hannah was based on Farrow being "a romanticized perception of Mia. She's very stable, she has eight children now, and she's able to run her career and have good relationships with her sister and her mother. I'm very impressed with those qualities, and I thought if she had two unstable sisters, it would be interesting."

Allen says he was also inspired by the title. "I thought I'd like to make a film called Hannah and Her Sisters", he said, saying this prompted him to give Hannah two sisters. He was interested in making something about the relationship between sisters which he felt was more complex than that between brothers. "Maybe that comes from childhood; my mother had seven sisters and their children were female so all I knew were aunts and female cousins."

Shooting began in October of 1984 in New York City, with Mia Farrow's real-life apartment being used.

Mia Farrow later wrote that Allen had been intrigued about the subject of sisters for a long time. His earlier co-stars Janet Margolin and Diane Keaton both had two sisters each, and Farrow had three. She says Allen gave her an early copy of Hannah and Her Sisters saying she could play whatever sister she wanted, but that "he felt I should be Hannah, the more complex and enigmatic of the sisters ... whose stillness and internal strength he likened to the quality Al Pacino projected in The Godfather".

Farrow wrote, "It was the first time I criticized one of his scripts. To me, the characters seemed self-indulgent and dissolute in predictable ways. The script was wordy but it said nothing." She claims "Woody didn't disagree and tried to switch over to" an alternative idea, "but preproduction was already in progress, and we had to proceed".

She later elaborated:

It was my mother's stunned, chill reaction to the script that enabled me to see how he had taken many of the personal circumstances and themes of our lives, and, it seemed, had distorted them into cartoonish characterizations. At the same time he was my partner. I loved him. I could trust him with my life. And he was a writer: this is what writers do. All grist for the mill. Relatives have always grumbled. He had taken the ordinary stuff of our lives and lifted it into art. We were honored and outraged.

Farrow admitted "a small sick feeling ... deep inside me" which "I shared with nobody was my fear that Hannah and Her Sisters had openly and clearly spelled out his feelings for my sister. But this was fiction, I told myself ... So I put those thoughts out of my mind."

== Release ==
The film premiered at the US Film Festival in Park City, Utah, on January 25, 1986.

The film was screened out of competition at the 1986 Cannes Film Festival.

=== Box office ===
Hannah and Her Sisters opened on February 7, 1986, in 54 theaters, where it grossed $1,265,826 ($23,441 per screen) in its opening weekend, the first time an Allen film had debuted in theaters in cities other than New York City. When it expanded to 761 theaters on March 14, it garnered a respectable $2,707,966 ($3,809 per screen). It went on to gross $40,084,041 in the United States and Canada (including a re-release the following year), and remains one of the highest-grossing Woody Allen films. Adjusted for inflation it falls behind Annie Hall (1977) and Manhattan (1979), and possibly also one or two of his early comedies. Midnight in Paris (2011) later surpassed its North American gross.

== Reception ==
On Rotten Tomatoes, the film holds an approval rating of 91% based on 56 reviews, with an average rating of 8.40/10. The site's critics consensus reads: "Smart, tender, and funny in equal measure, Hannah and Her Sisters is one of Woody Allen's finest films." On Metacritic, the film has a weighted average score of 90 out of 100, based on 12 critics, indicating "universal acclaim". The film received seven Academy Award nominations including Best Picture. Allen received two Academy Award nominations, winning one for Best Screenplay, Original and he earned a nomination for Best Director. His work on the film was also recognized with two BAFTA Awards.

Critics Siskel and Ebert each rated the film among the top three of the 1986 film year; Roger Ebert's 1986 review of the film called it "the best movie [Woody Allen] has ever made". Three years later when the two critics discussed their lists of the 10 best films of the 1980s, Ebert, who had included no comedies on his list, stated that had he been required to include one, it would have been Hannah And Her Sisters.

Vincent Canby, of The New York Times, gave the film a highly favorable review, going as far as to say that it "sets new standards for Mr. Allen as well as for all American movie makers".

A poll of 100 film critics named Hannah and Her Sisters the best film of the year, after it appeared on 71 individual top ten lists.

In 2005, the Writers Guild of America, West ranked Allen's script the 95th among the 101 greatest screenplays ever written.

In October 2013, the film was voted by readers of The Guardian as the fourth best film directed by Woody Allen.

In 2014, Calum Marsh of Slant Magazine named Hannah and Her Sisters as Allen's greatest film, praising its ensemble cast and Allen's "dense, heady script" for its "balancing act of conflicting desires and feelings". It was also listed as Allen's finest work in a joint article by The Daily Telegraph film critics Robbie Collin and Tim Robey, who compared its structure with the works of Anton Chekhov and lauded it as "perhaps the most perfectly assured braiding of comedy and drama in mainstream American film. It feels like the miraculous sweet spot between all of its filmmaker's many modes and tones – biting without being cruel, profound without seeming sanctimonious, warmly humane without collapsing into goo." It was ranked third among Allen's films in a 2016 poll of Time Out contributors, with editor Joshua Rothkopf singling out the character of Holly as "the kind of desperate, flailing Manhattanite that future director-writers would spin entire careers out of".

=== Accolades ===
Michael Caine and Dianne Wiest won Academy Awards for Best Supporting Actor and Best Supporting Actress for their portrayals of Elliot and Holly, respectively. Hannah and Her Sisters was the last film to win in both supporting acting categories until The Fighter in 2011. The film was also nominated for Best Art Direction-Set Decoration and Best Film Editing.

Allen received the 1986 award for Best Director from the U.S. National Board of Review of Motion Pictures, Dianne Wiest won Best Supporting Actress, and the film was nominated for Best Film.

In France, the film was nominated for a César Award for Best Foreign Film.

Award	Category	Recipient(s)	Result
Academy Awards	Best Picture	Robert Greenhut	Nominated
Academy Awards	Best Director	Woody Allen	Nominated
Academy Awards	Best Original Screenplay	Woody Allen	Won
Academy Awards	Best Supporting Actor	Michael Caine	Won
Academy Awards	Best Supporting Actress	Dianne Wiest	Won
Academy Awards	Best Art Direction	Stuart Wurtzel, Carol Joffe	Nominated
Academy Awards	Best Film Editing	Susan E. Morse	Nominated
BAFTA Awards	Best Film	Robert Greenhut, Woody Allen	Nominated
BAFTA Awards	Best Director	Woody Allen	Won
BAFTA Awards	Best Original Screenplay	Woody Allen	Won
BAFTA Awards	Best Actor	Woody Allen	Nominated
BAFTA Awards	Best Actor	Michael Caine	Nominated
BAFTA Awards	Best Actress	Mia Farrow	Nominated
BAFTA Awards	Best Supporting Actress	Barbara Hershey	Nominated
BAFTA Awards	Best Film Editing	Susan E. Morse	Nominated
Directors Guild of America	Directing – Feature Film	Woody Allen	Nominated
Golden Globe Awards	Best Motion Picture – Comedy or Musical	Robert Greenhut	Won
Golden Globe Awards	Best Director	Woody Allen	Nominated
Golden Globe Awards	Best Screenplay	Woody Allen	Nominated
Golden Globe Awards	Supporting Actor	Michael Caine	Nominated
Golden Globe Awards	Supporting Actress	Dianne Wiest	Nominated
National Society of Film Critics	Best Film	Woody Allen	Nominated
National Society of Film Critics	Best Screenplay	Woody Allen	Nominated
National Society of Film Critics	Best Supporting Actress	Barbara Hershey	Nominated
National Society of Film Critics	Best Supporting Actress	Dianne Wiest	Won
New York Film Critics Circle	Best Film	Woody Allen	Won
New York Film Critics Circle	Best Director	Woody Allen	Won
New York Film Critics Circle	Best Screenplay	Woody Allen	Nominated
New York Film Critics Circle	Best Supporting Actress	Dianne Wiest	Won
Writers Guild of America	Best Original Screenplay	Woody Allen	Won

== Legacy ==
In 1986, Mad magazine satirized the film as "Henna and Her Sickos" which was written by Debbee Ovitz with art by Mort Drucker.

In 2016, Olivia Wilde directed a live table reading of Hannah and Her Sisters at The New York Times' small and packed-out Times Center theatre. The cast included Wilde as Hannah, Rose Byrne as Lee, Uma Thurman as Holly, Michael Sheen as Elliott, Bobby Cannavale as Mickey, and Salman Rushdie as Frederick with Maya Rudolph, Jason Sudeikis and Justin Long filling out the supporting parts. Questlove served as the musical director who cued the musical selections ranging from jazz renditions of the Great American Songbook to Bach.

== Soundtrack ==
Note: not all of these selections appear on the soundtrack issued by MCA Records.

- Sola, perduta abbandonata – Segment from the opera "Manon Lescaut" by Giacomo Puccini – Orchestra del Teatro Regio di Torino – Conductor Angelo Campori
- You Made Me Love You – by Thomas Joseph McCarthy and James V. Monaco – Performed by Harry James
- I've Heard That Song Before – by Sammy Cahn and Jule Styne – Performed by Harry James
- Bewitched, Bothered and Bewildered – by Richard Rodgers and Lorenz Hart – Performed by Lloyd Nolan and Maureen O'Sullivan
- Just You, Just Me – by Raymond Klages and Jesse Greer – Performed by Dick Hyman
- Where or When – by Richard Rodgers and Lorenz Hart
- Concerto For Two Violins and Orchestra – by Johann Sebastian Bach – The Sofia Soloists Chamber Orchestra – Conducted by Vasil Kazandzhiev
- Back to the Apple – by Frank Foster and Count Basie – Performed by Count Basie and His Orchestra
- The Trot – by Benny Carter – Performed by Count Basie and His Orchestra
- I Remember You – by Johnny Mercer & Victor Schertzinger – Performed by Dave Brubeck
- Madama Butterfly – by Giacomo Puccini – Performed by Orchestra e Coro del Teatro dell'Opera di Roma – Conducted by John Barbirolli
- Concerto for Harpsichord in F minor – by Johann Sebastian Bach – Performed by Gustav Leonhardt
- You Are Too Beautiful – by Lorenz Hart and Richard Rodgers – Performed by Derek Smith
- If I Had You – by Jimmy Campbell, Reginald Connelly, and Ted Shapiro – Performed by Roy Eldridge
- I'm in Love Again – by Cole Porter – Performed by Bobby Short
- I'm Old Fashioned – by Jerome Kern and Johnny Mercer – Sung by Dianne Wiest – Piano: Bernie Leighton
- The Way You Look Tonight – by Jerome Kern and Dorothy Fields – Sung by Carrie Fisher – Piano: Bernie Leighton
- It Could Happen to You – by Johnny Burke and Jimmy Van Heusen – Performed by Dick Hyman
- Polkadots and Moonbeams – by Johnny Burke and Jimmy Van Heusen – Performed by Dick Hyman
- Avalon – Written by Vincent Rose, Al Jolson, and Buddy G. DeSylva – Performed by Dick Hyman
- Isn't It Romantic? – by Richard Rodgers and Lorenz Hart – Performed by Derek Smith
- Slip into the Crowd – by Michael Bramon – Performed by Michael Bramon and The 39 Steps
- Freedonia's Going to War – from Duck Soup (1933) – Music by Harry Ruby – Performed by Groucho Marx, Chico Marx, Zeppo Marx, and Harpo Marx with chorus
