= Carol Joffe =

American set decorator

- Born: Carol Shapiro
- Occupation: Set decorator
- Years active: 1981-1991
- Spouse: Lawrence Holofcener (m. 1955; div. 1961) Charles H. Joffe (m. 1968; died 2008)
- Children: 3, including Nicole Holofcener

Carol Joffe is an American set decorator. She was nominated for two Academy Awards in the category Best Art Direction for the films Hannah and Her Sisters and Radio Days.

== Biography ==
Born Carol Shapiro (to parents Sylvia and Edward Shapiro, owner of a radio store, in the Bronx, New York City), Carol Joffe was first married to actor and artist Lawrence Holofcener in 1954, with whom she had two daughters, Suzanne Holofcener and director Nicole Holofcener. They divorced in 1961. She subsequently married film producer Charles H. Joffe. Together, they had one son.

== Selected filmography ==
- Hannah and Her Sisters (1986)
- Radio Days (1987)
