= Matt Starr (visual artist) =

American artist & poet

- Known for: Poetry and art
- Notable work: "MOUTHFUL" (2024); My Annie Hall (2018)
- Website: www.matt-starr.com

Matt Starr is an American artist, poet, conceptual comedian, and experimental filmmaker known for his provocative viral works.

== Early life ==
Starr obtained his BFA in studio art and a minor in Swahili from the Indiana University.

== Art career ==
In 2015 Starr created a line of clothing called "Babycore" inspired by outfits he wore during his early childhood. This trend quickly went viral and inspired Jeremy Scott's Fall/Winter 2015 ready to wear collection and Miley Cyrus's BB Talk (2015) music video.

In 2016 Starr enacted and documented the performance piece "Amazon Boy," which was included in the piece of "Art on Amazon" in the March 2020 issue of Art in America.

In 2017 to celebrate the fortieth birthday of the film classic Starr filmed a truncated remake of Woody Allen's "Annie Hall' with a cast of octogenarians from the Lennox Hill Neighborhood House. The idea for the project arose from Starr's relationship with his grandmother in whom he noticed a measurable cognitive decline due to alzheimer's. Allen himself approved of the project and even suggested other films to be remade. The effort was funded with a Kickstarter campaign. In Starr and Sachs' version of the film Alvy Singer is played by the then 94 year old Harry Miller a designer for TV and stage who won two Emmy's during his career for his work on the CBS soap opera Guiding Light.

In April 2018, Starr and Ellie Sachs created the installation "The Museum of Banned Objects", in the gallery at Manhattan's Ace Hotel, sponsored by Planned Parenthood, in a commentary on access to birth control.

In 2020, during the early months of the COVID-19 pandemic, Starr and Sachs founded the Long Distance Movie Club, "a virtual movie-watching group that meets every two weeks in an effort to not only engage seniors in a sense of community but also to help them find some escapism in the midst of self-isolation."

In 2022, Starr co-founded the independent New York City based book press Dream Baby Press which is known for throwing literary events in unexpected and iconic NYC locations such as the Penn Station Sbarro
