= Mordecai Lawner =

American actor

Mordecai Lawner (June 9, 1928 – November 27, 2014) was an American film and theater actor. His film credits included Woody Allen's Annie Hall in 1977, Raw Deal in 1986, Ghostbusters II in 1989, and A Fish in the Bathtub in 1999.

== Biography ==
Lawner, a resident of Manhattan for the majority of his life, graduated from City College of New York. A veteran of the U.S. Army, he was stationed in West Germany during the Korean War. In addition to his acting career, Lawner also taught theater at Carnegie Mellon University in Pittsburgh, Pennsylvania, as well as the High School of Performing Arts and the Neighborhood Playhouse School of the Theatre in New York City.

In film, Lawner was possibly best known for playing the father of Alvy Singer, played by Woody Allen, in Annie Hall in 1977. Lawner can be seen in a flashback to Alvy's childhood, when the family lived under the Coney Island Cyclone roller coaster. In the flashback, Lawner yells at his wife (Joan Neuman) for firing their cleaning lady, telling her "She has no money! She's got a right to steal from us! After all, who is she gonna steal from if not us?" He also appeared in television, including an episode of Law & Order.

Lawner also enjoyed a lengthy stage career in both Broadway and Off-Broadway productions. He often co-starred opposite his late wife, actress Eugenia Thornton. Lawner played Stanley in George C. Scott's Circle in the Square production of Death of a Salesman on Broadway in 1995. He continued to perform on the regional theater circuit into his 80s, including a production of Tuesdays With Morrie in Saratoga Springs, New York.

More recently, Lawner flew to Los Angeles to film an Esurance television commercial, which aired in 2014.

Mordecai Lawner died of heart failure at Lenox Hill Hospital on the Upper East Side of Manhattan on November 27, 2014, at the age of 86. His wife, actress Eugenia Thornton, died in 2005. Lawner's memorial service was held at the Frank E. Campbell Funeral Chapel on Madison Avenue on December 6, 2014.

== Filmography ==
Year	Title	Role	Notes
1974	Claudine	Process Server	
1975	Hester Street	Waiter	
1977	Annie Hall	Mr. Singer	
1982	Soup for One	Furniture Salesman	
1984	Billions for Boris	Painter	
1986	Raw Deal	Marcellino	
1989	Ghostbusters II	Man with a Ticket	
1999	A Fish in the Bathtub	Bernie	
