= Charles H. Joffe =

American film producer

- Born: July 16, 1929; Brooklyn, New York, U.S.
- Died: July 9, 2008 (aged 78); Los Angeles, California, U.S.
- Other name: Charles Joffe
- Occupation: Film producer
- Years active: 1969–2008
- Spouse: Carol Joffe (m. 1968)
- Children: 2
- Relatives: Nicole Holofcener (stepdaughter)

Charles H. Joffe (July 16, 1929 – July 9, 2008) was an American film producer and comedy talent manager. He is best known as, in partnership with Jack Rollins, the producer or executive producer of most of Woody Allen's films. Joffe won the 1977 Academy Award for Best Picture as producer of Allen's Annie Hall.

Annie Hall was listed as "A Jack Rollins and Charles H. Joffe Production", though only Joffe took producer credit and received the Academy Award for Best Picture. Both were Allen's longtime managers and had that credit on all his films from 1969 to 1993. Joffe focused more on Allen, with Rollins focusing on others. Their clients also included Robert Klein and David Letterman.

== Biography ==
Joffe was born in Brooklyn, New York, the son of Esther (Gordon) and Sid Joffe, a pharmacist. He worked as a booking agent for bands at local nightclubs while studying journalism at Syracuse University. He then worked under Rollins as a junior agent at Music Corporation of America. In 1953, he and Rollins left MCA and formed their own agency in Manhattan.

== Personal life ==
Joffe was married to set decorator Carol Joffe (former wife of sculptor Lawrence Holofcener) with whom he has an adopted son, Cory Joffe, and two stepdaughters, Suzanne Holofcener and director Nicole Holofcener. He died at Cedars-Sinai Medical Center in Los Angeles, a week before his 79th birthday, after a long illness.

== Filmography ==
=== Producer ===
Year	Title	Notes
1969	The Woody Allen Special	Comedy Special
1969	Don't Drink the Water	
1969	Take the Money and Run	
1969-1971	The Dick Cavett Show	8 episodes
1971	Bananas	
1972	Men of Crisis: The Harvey Wallinger Story	Short
1972	Play It Again, Sam	
1972	Everything You Always Wanted to Know About Sex* (*But Were Afraid to Ask)	
1973	Sleeper	
1975	Love and Death	
1976	The Front	
1977	Annie Hall	Oscar : 1977 Best Picture
1978	Interiors	
1979	Manhattan	
1980	Stardust Memories	
1980	Arthur	
1980	Good Time Harry	Episode: Harry Part 1
1982	A Midsummer Night's Sex Comedy	
1982	The Marx Brothers in a Nutshell	Television documentary
1982	Star of the Family	Episode: Pilot
1983	Zelig	
1984	Broadway Danny Rose	
1985	The Purple Rose of Cairo	
1986	Hannah and Her Sisters	
1987	Radio Days	
1987	September	
1988	Another Woman	
1988	Late Night with David Letterman: 6th Anniversary Special	Television Special
1989	Late Night with David Letterman: 7th Anniversary Special	Television Special
1989	New York Stories (segment: Oedipus Wrecks)	
1989	Crimes and Misdemeanors	
1990	Alice	
1991	Shadows and Fog	
1992	Husbands and Wives	
1993	Manhattan Murder Mystery	
1993	Rick Reynolds: Only the Truth Is Funny	Television Special
1994	Bullets over Broadway	
1995	Mighty Aphrodite	
1996	Everyone Says I Love You	
1997	Deconstructing Harry	
1998	Celebrity	
1999	Sweet and Lowdown	
2000	Small Time Crooks	
2001	The Curse of the Jade Scorpion	
2002	Hollywood Ending	
2003	Anything Else	
2004	Melinda and Melinda	
2005	Match Point	
2006	Scoop	
2007	Cassandra's Dream	
2008	Vicky Cristina Barcelona	
2009	Whatever Works	

== Awards and nominations ==
Year	Award	Category	Nominated work	Result	Ref.
1977	Academy Award	Academy Award for Best Picture	Annie Hall	Won	
1994	CableAce Award	Best Stand-Up Comedy Special	Rick Reynolds: Only the Truth Is Funny	Nominated	
