= Anne Byrne (actress) =

American actress

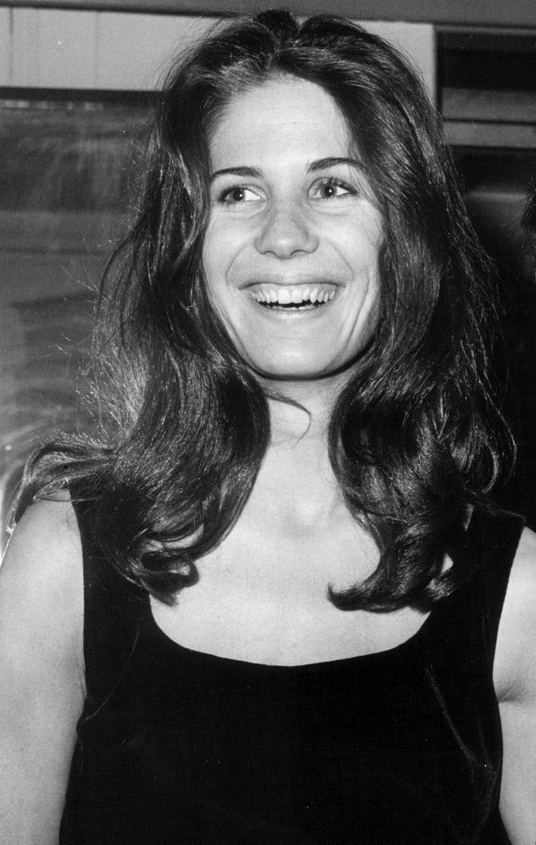
- Byrne in 1968
- Born: September 28, 1943 (age 83); New York City, New York, U.S.
- Occupation: Actress
- Spouses: Dustin Hoffman (m. 1969; div. 1980); Ivan Kronenfeld (m. 1986; died 2018)
- Children: 2

Anne Byrne Kronenfeld (born September 28, 1943) is an American actress. She had a small role as the wife of Woody Allen's philandering best friend in Manhattan (1979), and also appeared in Why Would I Lie? (1980) and A Night Full of Rain (1978).

After meeting in 1963, Byrne married actor Dustin Hoffman in May 1969. Hoffman adopted Karina (b. 1967), Byrne's child from a previous marriage, and together the couple had daughter Jenna (born October 15, 1969). The couple divorced in 1980.

Byrne and Hoffman lived on West 11th Street in Greenwich Village, Manhattan. In 1970, members of the Weather Underground, a group of left-wing militants planning a terror bombing of Columbia University and Fort Dix in New Jersey, were killed by a premature detonation of explosives they had been stockpiling in the house next door to the couple. Dustin Hoffman can be seen in footage from the scene.

She is of Irish Catholic background.

== Partial filmography ==
- Papillon (1973) - Mrs. Dega (uncredited)
- A Night Full of Rain (1978) - Friend
- Manhattan (1979) - Emily
- Why Would I Lie? (1980) - Faith (final film role)
