= A Fish in the Bathtub =

- DVD Cover
- Directed by: Joan Micklin Silver
- Starring: Jerry Stiller
- Distributed by: Cohen Media Group (2019); Curb Entertainment; E Stars Films (2000) (China - TV); MGM Home Entertainment (2009) (United States - DVD)
- Release date: March 1999
- Running time: 96 minutes
- Country: United States
- Language: English
- Box office: $1,826

A Fish in the Bathtub is a 1999 American comedy drama film directed by Joan Micklin Silver. It stars real life married couple Jerry Stiller and Anne Meara.

== Plot ==
Sam and Molly are a husband and wife whose marriage has been stretched to the brink after 40 years of incessant bickering over the smallest of things, not the least of which is Sam's inexplicable decision to keep a fish in the bathtub. This, along with a daily harangue from the cantankerous Sam, forces Molly to finally pack a bag and go to son Joel's home, which sets the stage for the family to fight through this bump in the road and get life back on track.

== Reception ==
The film was generally poorly received. Contact Music referred to it as "Just not that humorous". The New York Times criticized the film's dialogue, stating that "...the bickering goes too far..." Killer Movies referred to its plot as "...nothing particularly new or significant or eye-popping..."

== Cast ==
- Jerry Stiller as Sam
- Anne Meara as Molly
- Mark Ruffalo as Joel
- Jane Adams as Ruthie
- Missy Yager as Sharon
- Paul Benedict as Milo
- Doris Roberts as Freida
- Louis Zorich as Morris
- Phyllis Newman as Sylvia Rosen
- Val Avery as Abe
- Bob Dishy as Lou Moskowitz
- Pamela Gray as Tracy Laughlin
- Mordecai Lawner as Bernie
- Peter McRobbie as Father Malaccky
- Jonathan Hogan as Eldon Krantz
- Elizabeth Franz as Bea Greenberg
