= Sam B. Girgus =

Sam B. Girgus (born c. 1941) most recent book is Generations of Jewish Directors and the Struggle for America’s Soul. He is also editor of the Renewing the American Narrative book series for Palgrave Macmillan and the author of 10 books and editor of several other works. He is a retired professor of English and American Studies who taught at the Universities of New Mexico, Alabama, Oregon, the Opportunity Center and Vanderbilt University. His new essay on Serpico will appear in a new book on film and philosophy edited by philosopher Richard Kearney. He has held a Rockefeller Humanities Fellowship and other awards. He is well known for his analysis of the works of Woody Allen in his books such as The Films of Woody Allen (2002) and A Companion to Woody Allen (2013) with Peter J. Bailey. He believes ultimately that Allen's films deconstruct the world in which we live. Girgus has also authored a book on Clint Eastwood and books such as The American self: myth, ideology, and popular culture (1981), Hollywood Renaissance: The Cinema of Democracy in the Era (1998), America on Film: Modernism, Documentary, and a Changing America (2002), Levinas and the Cinema of Redemption: Time, Ethics, and the Feminine (2010), and Time, Existential Presence and the Cinematic Image: Ethics and Emergence to Being in Film (2018), among others. Several of his works have addressed the relationship between film and literature and politics and democratic individualism. Born on the Lower East Side of New York, Girgus attended Stuyvesant High School and was editor-in-chief of The Daily Orange at Syracuse University until a series of editorials and articles on the university's alleged policy toward inter-racial dating sparked campus demonstrations. He worked as a reporter in Syracuse, Elmira, N.Y. and at the Providence Journal in Rhode Island. He received his doctorate in American Studies at the University of New Mexico in 1972.
