= Sammy Kaye =

American bandleader and songwriter (1910–1987)

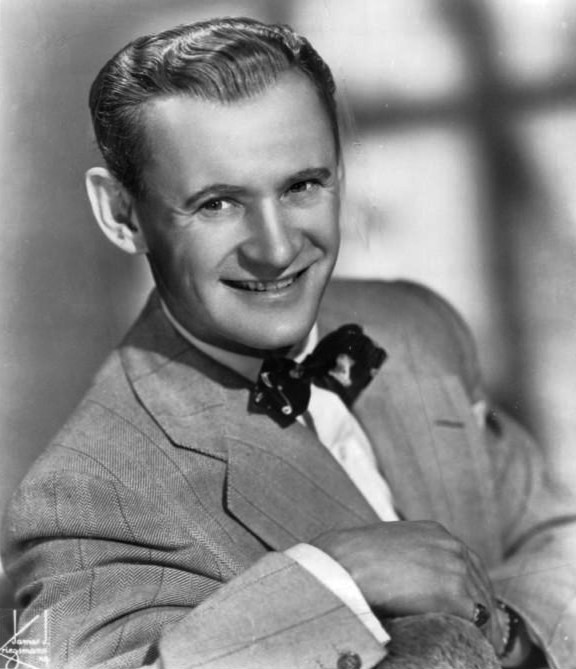
- Kaye in 1952

Background information
- Born: Samuel Zarnocay, Jr. March 13, 1910; Lakewood, Ohio, U.S.
- Died: June 2, 1987 (aged 77) Ridgewood, New Jersey, U.S.
- Genres: Big band, swing, sweet jazz
- Occupations: Musician, bandleader
- Instruments: Saxophone, clarinet
- Years active: 1932-1987
- Labels: Vocalion, RCA Victor, Columbia, Bell, Decca

Sammy Kaye (born Samuel Zarnocay Jr.; March 13, 1910 – June 2, 1987) was an American bandleader and songwriter, whose tag line, "Swing and Sway with Sammy Kaye", became one of the most famous of the Big Band Era. The expression springs from his first hit single in 1937, "Swing and Sway" (U.S. no. 15). He was the first to record and release the standard "Blueberry Hill" in 1940. During World War II, he co-wrote and recorded the anthemic "Remember Pearl Harbor" (U.S. No. 3). He was the first to record and release the #1 song "Daddy" in 1941. His final #1 hit was "Harbor Lights" in 1950.

== Biography ==
Kaye, born in Lakewood, Ohio, graduated from Rocky River High School in Rocky River, Ohio. At Ohio University in Athens, Ohio he was a member of Theta Chi fraternity. Kaye could play the saxophone and the clarinet, but he never featured himself as a soloist on either instrument.

He formed his band "Sammie Kaye's Ohioans" in 1932. He was one of the leading exponents of the swing era's "sweet" bands, with a repertoire of sedate dance music (as opposed to "hot" bands, which played energetic rhythm numbers). Kaye made a large number of records for Vocalion Records, RCA Victor, Columbia Records, Bell Records, and the American Decca record label. He was also a hit on radio; he was known for an audience-participation gimmick called "So You Want to Lead a Band?" where audience members would be called onto stage in an attempt to conduct the orchestra, with the possibility of winning batons. Kaye was also known for his use of "singing of song titles", which was emulated by Kay Kyser and Blue Barron.

He had two number one records on the Your Hit Parade chart in 1938. His first number one recording was "Rosalie", which hit number one for the week of January 15, 1938 on the Your Hit Parade chart with a non-consecutive run of two weeks at the top of the chart. His second number one was "Love Walked In", which was number one for four weeks. Both featured vocals by Tommy Ryan.

He was the first to record and release "Blueberry Hill" in 1941, a song which became a standard in several genres, including pop, jazz, big band, swing, and rock and roll. He was also the first to record and release the classic song "Daddy" in 1941, which hit no. 1 and which was recorded by other bands and singers such as Frankie Masters, The Andrews Sisters, Freddy Martin, and Della Reese.

Shortly after the Japanese attack on Pearl Harbor (December 7, 1941), Kaye wrote the music and Don Reid wrote the words to "Remember Pearl Harbor", the tune of which was based on Ohio University's "Alma Mater". On December 17, 1941, RCA Victor recorded the song, with Sammy Kaye's Swing and Sway Band and The Glee Club. The 78-rpm single was released in 1942, reaching no. 3 on the Billboard singles chart during the week of February 7, 1942.

His final number one was the highest charting recording of the standard "Harbor Lights" with vocals by Tony Alamo and the Kaydets, topping the Billboard pop singles chart in 1950.

He appeared on the Ed Sullivan Show in 1954, 1957, and in 1965.

He continued to perform until 1987, the year of his death.

== After the big-band era ==
Sammy Kaye was one of the relatively few bandleaders of the 1930s who remained active in the 1950s. Many of his contemporaries had disbanded after World War II, when popular music emphasized singers over orchestras. In 1950 Kaye scored a number-one hit with "Harbor Lights". In 1955, Kaye recorded for the RCA Thesaurus transcription service, resulting in his orchestra being featured five times a week on several national radio networks.

His band members included Ralph Flanagan, who later led his own band. Singers included Don Cornell, Billy Williams (the country music singer with the Pecos River Rogues), Tommy Ryan, Gary Willner, Barry Frank, Tony Russo, and Nancy Norman. All members of the band sometimes sang backing vocals in various combination as the "Kaydets". Although his musicians were always competent, the jazz critic George T. Simon described them as "magnificently trained and exceedingly unoriginal".

== Television ==
Sammy Kaye appeared semi-regularly on network television during the 1950s:

- The Sammy Kaye Show on CBS Television (1951–52)
- The Sammy Kaye Show on NBC Television (summer 1953)
- So You Want to Lead a Band on ABC Television (1954–55)
- Sammy Kaye's Music from Manhattan on ABC (1958–59)

== Death ==
Kaye died at Valley Hospital in Ridgewood, New Jersey of cancer. His body was returned to Lakewood, Ohio and after a Mass at St. Christopher Catholic Church in Rocky River, he was buried in the family plot next to his parents at Lakewood Park Cemetery. Prior to his death in 1987, Kaye left his orchestra to Roger Thorpe of New Paltz, New York. Thorpe, an accomplished music professor at SUNY Dutchess and director of the Dutchess Jazz Ensemble, knew Kaye over the years. Thorpe led the Sammy Kaye orchestra for 33 years, appearing on tours and cruises; Thorpe died in 2023.

== In popular culture ==
1942 sheet music. "Remember Pearl Harbor". Republic Music.

- He was the first to record the jazz standard "There Will Never Be Another You" in 1942 in the film musical Iceland in which he also appeared in with his orchestra.
- He had the highest charting recording of the standard "Harbor Lights", which reached number one on the Billboard pop singles chart in 1950.
- The iconic 1983 Christmas movie A Christmas Story features the Sammy Kaye and His Orchestra recording of "I Guess I'll Have to Dream the Rest".
- His 1942 recording "Remember Pearl Harbor" is featured in Woody Allen's 1987 film Radio Days about his childhood memories listening to the big bands on the radio in the 1940s.
- He was the first to record and release the standard "Blueberry Hill" in 1940.
- In October 1939, Kaye's "sweet band" sound was satirized by Charlie Barnet and his Orchestra with the song "The Wrong Idea (Swing and Sweat with Charlie Barnet)" written by Charlie Barnet and Billy May.

== Compositions ==
Sammy Kaye wrote or co-wrote the following songs: "Swing and Sway" in 1937, "Remember Pearl Harbor" (U.S. No. 3), "Until Tomorrow (Goodnight, My Love)" (U.S. No. 10), "Belmont Boogie", "Kaye's Melody", "Wanderin'" (U.S. No. 11), "I Gotta See a Dream About a Girl", "I Miss Your Kiss" and "Bottoms Up (Let's Have a Ball)" with Sunny Skylar, "The Midnight Ride", and "Hawaiian Sunset". "I Miss Your Kiss" was released as a U.S. War Department V-Disc in May, 1945 as 433A during World War II for American troops overseas. He also wrote the lyrics and the music to the 1949 Christmas song "I Want to Wish You a Merry Christmas"" and "All Around the Christmas Tree" and "Santa, Santa, Santa Claus" with Sunny Skylar in 1952.

== Filmography ==
- Song of the Open Road (1944)
- Iceland (1942)

== Legacy ==
Kaye was posthumously inducted into the Big Band and Jazz Hall of Fame in 1992. For his contributions to the recording industry he has a star on the Hollywood Walk of Fame.

== See also ==
- "Daddy (Sammy Kaye song)"
- List of Your Hit Parade number-one songs
