= Remember Pearl Harbor (song) =

Song written about the Japanese attack on Pearl Harbor

Single by Sammy Kaye
- Written: 1941
- Published: 1941
- Released: January 2, 1942
- Recorded: December 17, 1941
- Genre: American patriotic song, Swing, military march
- Length: 2:30
- Label: RCA Victor
- Songwriters: Don Reid and Sammy Kaye
- Lyricist: Don Reid

"Remember Pearl Harbor" is an American patriotic march written by Don Reid and Sammy Kaye in the week immediately following the December 7, 1941 attack on the military facilities on the Hawaiian island on Oahu by naval forces of the Japanese navy. Sammy Kaye released a recording of the song on RCA Victor in 1942. The 78 recording reached no. 3 on the Billboard pop singles chart.

The song appeared in the 1987 Woody Allen film Radio Days and the 1963 film The Victors.

== Background ==
Ten days after news of the attacks on Pearl Harbor, Kaye's "Swing and Sway band" recorded the song in New York City, using Kaye's "Glee Club" for vocal harmonies. The tune was inspired and based on his undergraduate college’s own tune “Alma Mater, Ohio”. Although the group performed four takes, the first take was the chosen track for mastering, producer Leonard Joy supervising the recording and Kaye directing. Billboard magazine announced the song's release on the RCA Victor label in its January 17, 1942 issue.

Two weeks after release, the song was #7 nationally in record sales and #10 in sheet music sales. The Victor Records 78 single peaked at #3 on the Billboard singles chart that year with a chart run of eight weeks. At years' end the song remained on several top 100 lists. By January 1943, Sammy Kaye had donated $4000 from the song's royalties to Navy Relief funds.

Bandleader Eddy Howard released a recording of the song on Columbia Records that same year. Charlie Spivak with Garry Stevens on vocals, Duke Daly, The Fireside Singers, and Dick Robertson also recorded the song

== Legacy ==
In December 2017, President Donald Trump, honoring veterans of the Pearl Harbor attack in a ceremony at the White House, asked members in the room, "'Remember Pearl Harbor.' Have you heard that before a couple of times, 'Remember Pearl Harbor?'"
