= Virginia Rutter =

Virginia E Rutter (born 1963) is an American sociologist and sexologist, professor at the Department of Sociology of Framingham State University in Framingham. A senior fellow at the Council on Contemporary Families, she specializes in mainly gender, sexuality and marriage, and is also adept at family policy, mental health and public sociology. She is co-author of the book The Gender of Sexuality: Exploring Sexual Possibilities with Pepper Schwartz.
