= 1987 Academy Awards =

1987 Academy Awards may refer to:

- 59th Academy Awards, the Academy Awards ceremony that took place in 1987
- 60th Academy Awards, the 1988 ceremony honoring the best in film for 1987
