= Manhattan (1979 film) =

Film by Woody Allen

- Theatrical release poster
- Directed by: Woody Allen
- Written by: Woody Allen; Marshall Brickman
- Produced by: Charles H. Joffe
- Starring: Woody Allen; Diane Keaton; Michael Murphy; Mariel Hemingway; Meryl Streep; Anne Byrne
- Cinematography: Gordon Willis
- Edited by: Susan E. Morse
- Music by: George Gershwin played by the New York Philharmonic, Zubin Mehta and the Buffalo Philharmonic, Michael Tilson Thomas
- Distributed by: United Artists
- Release dates: April 18, 1979 (premiere); April 25, 1979 (United States)
- Running time: 96 minutes
- Country: United States
- Language: English
- Budget: $9 million
- Box office: $40.2 million

Manhattan is a 1979 American romantic comedy-drama film directed by Woody Allen and produced by Charles H. Joffe from a screenplay written by Allen and Marshall Brickman. Allen co-stars as a twice-divorced 42-year-old comedy writer who dates a 17-year-old girl (Mariel Hemingway) but falls in love with his best friend's (Michael Murphy) mistress (Diane Keaton). Meryl Streep and Anne Byrne also star.

Manhattan was Allen's first film in black-and-white, and was shot in 2.35:1 widescreen. It features music by George Gershwin, including Rhapsody in Blue, which inspired the film. Allen described the film as a combination of Annie Hall and Interiors.

Upon its release in April 1979 by United Artists, Manhattan received critical acclaim and was nominated for the Academy Award for Best Supporting Actress for Hemingway and Best Original Screenplay for Allen and Brickman. Its North American box-office receipts of $39.9 million made it Allen's second biggest box-office success (adjusted for inflation). It ranks 46th on AFI's 100 Years...100 Laughs list and number 63 on Bravo's "100 Funniest Movies". In 2001, the United States Library of Congress deemed the film "culturally, historically, or aesthetically significant" and selected it for preservation in the National Film Registry.

== Plot ==
The film opens with a montage of the New York City borough of Manhattan, accompanied by the initial clarinet solo of George Gershwin's Rhapsody in Blue. The work continues as an overdubbed narrator recites a succession of ideas for Chapter One of a book about a man who loves New York City. The narrator is Isaac Davis, a twice-divorced 42-year-old television comedy writer. Isaac is dating Tracy, a 17-year-old high school student. Isaac's best friend is Yale Pollack, a college professor married to Emily. They are at Elaine's. As the friends walk home after the double date, Yale confides to Isaac he is having an affair with another woman. Isaac is intrigued, and keeps Yale's secret.

While Isaac and Tracy are visiting the Guggenheim Museum, they unexpectedly meet Yale, on a date with Mary Wilkie, the woman Yale mentioned to Isaac. Isaac is annoyed and offended by Mary's cultural snobbery and intellectual pretentiousness, and later tells Tracy he doesn't understand Yale's behavior. Several days later, Isaac meets Mary again at an Equal Rights Amendment fundraiser at the Museum of Modern Art. Mary and Isaac have coffee, and she invites him to walk her dog with her. They walk to a park under the Queensboro Bridge and talk until the lights on the bridge signal sunrise.

Despite his attraction to Mary, Isaac continues his relationship with Tracy, but emphasizes to her that it cannot be long-term. Tracy says she is in love with Isaac and has been accepted to an acting program in London. Isaac encourages her to take full advantage of the opportunity and dismisses her feelings for him, urging her to think of him and their relationship as "just an interesting detour on life's highway".

Yale breaks up with Mary, and suggests that Isaac date her. Isaac breaks up with Tracy, who is devastated when Isaac tells her he is in love with someone else. Mary and Isaac begin dating. Curious about Isaac's new girlfriend, Emily organizes a double date, unaware of the awkwardness. As the couples walk past a bookstore, Isaac sees a book by his ex-wife: Marriage, Divorce, and Selfhood. Emily reads passages from the book aloud, amusing Mary and Yale and humiliating Isaac.

Upon returning home, Mary tells Isaac she is still in love with Yale and wants to break up. Furious and hurt, Isaac walks to the college where Yale teaches and angrily confronts him. Isaac demands to know why Yale suggested he date Mary, and criticizes Yale's rationalizations for his extramarital affairs. Yale says he met Mary first and is in love with her, and excuses his behavior by saying he is only human. Later, Isaac talks with Emily about Yale's cheating and their breakup, and Emily reveals her pique at Isaac for introducing Mary to Yale.

Isaac lies on his sofa, dictating an idea for a short story. He muses about people in Manhattan who create unnecessary neurotic problems for themselves and then "certain things that make life worthwhile" for him, listing works of art, music, and literature, and then "Tracy's face". Isaac pauses and sets down the microphone. He peruses a gift Tracy had given him, a harmonica. Unable to reach her by phone, Isaac runs to her family's apartment building and sees she is about to depart for London. He approaches and tells Tracy he's changed his mind and doesn't want her to go because "I just don't want that thing I like about you to change". Tracy says the plans have been made and she has to go, but reassures Isaac, "not everybody gets corrupted...you have to have a little faith in people". Isaac smiles slightly. The film closes then with a montage of the Manhattan skyline shrouded in twilight and, as at the beginning, accompanied by Rhapsody in Blue.

== Cast ==
- Woody Allen as Isaac Davis
- Diane Keaton as Mary Wilkie
- Michael Murphy as Yale Pollack
- Mariel Hemingway as Tracy
- Meryl Streep as Jill Davis
- Anne Byrne as Emily Pollack
- Karen Ludwig as Connie
- Michael O'Donoghue as Dennis (party guest)
- Tisa Farrow as a party guest
- Wallace Shawn as Jeremiah
- Bella Abzug as the guest of honor
- Charles Levin, Karen Allen, and David Rasche as television actors
- Mark Linn-Baker and Frances Conroy as Shakespearean actors
- Ray Serra as the pizzeria waiter

== Production ==
=== Development ===
According to Allen, the idea for Manhattan originated from his love of Gershwin's music. He was listening to one of the composer's albums of overtures and thought, "this would be a beautiful thing to make ... a movie in black and white ... a romantic movie." Allen has said that Manhattan was "like a mixture of what I was trying to do with Annie Hall and Interiors" and that it deals with the problem of people trying to live a decent existence in an essentially junk-obsessed contemporary culture without selling out, admitting that he himself could conceive of giving away all of his "possessions to charity and living in much more modest circumstances," adding that he has "rationalized [his] way out of it so far, but [he] could conceive of doing it."

In his autobiography Apropos of Nothing (2020), Allen writes that Tracy is based on Stacey Nelkin, his real-life girlfriend in the second half of the 1970s. When Allen and Marshall Brickman wrote the movie, "we called the character Mariel Hemingway played 'Tracy' instead of 'Stacey' in a burst of creative inspiration. I know the picture did her justice, as we have remained friends still."

Forty years later, Christina "Babi" Engelhardt claimed that the film was partially based on her unconfirmed relationship with Allen, which allegedly began when she was 17 after they met at a restaurant in New York in 1976. But Nelkin, who dated Allen when she was 17 to 19, has confirmed that Tracy is based on her. Engelhardt later said she presumes that Tracy is "a composite" of Nelkin and "any number" of other "presumed" girls Allen was dating at the time, calling herself "a fragment".

=== Filming ===
Allen talked to cinematographer Gordon Willis about how fun it would be to shoot the film in black and white, Panavision aspect ratio (2.35:1) because it would give "a great look at New York City, which is sort of one of the characters in the film". Allen decided to shoot his film in black and white because that was how he remembered it from when he was small. "Maybe it's a reminiscence from old photographs, films, books and all that. But that's how I remember New York." The film was shot on location with the exception of some of the scenes in the planetarium, which were filmed on a set.

The bridge shot

The famous Queensboro Bridge shot was done at five in the morning. The production had to bring their own bench as there were no park benches at the location. The bridge had two sets of necklace lights on a timer controlled by the city. When the sun came up, the bridge lights went off. Willis made arrangements with the city to leave the lights on and that he would let them know when they got the shot. Afterward, they could be turned off. As they started to shoot the scene, one string of bridge lights went out, and Allen was forced to use that take.

After finishing the film, Allen was very unhappy with it and asked United Artists not to release it. He offered to make a film for no fee instead. He later said: "I just thought to myself, 'At this point in my life, if this is the best I can do, they shouldn't give me money to make movies.'"

=== Music ===
All titles of the soundtrack were compositions by George Gershwin. They were performed by the New York Philharmonic under Zubin Mehta and the Buffalo Philharmonic under Michael Tilson Thomas.

- New York Philharmonic with Gary Graffman
  - Rhapsody in Blue
  - "Love is Sweeping the Country"
  - "Land of the Gay Caballero"
  - "Sweet and Low Down"
  - "I've Got a Crush on You"
  - "Do-Do-Do"
  - "'S Wonderful"
  - "Oh, Lady Be Good!"
  - "Strike Up the Band"
  - "Embraceable You"
- Buffalo Philharmonic
  - "Someone to Watch Over Me"
  - "He Loves and She Loves"
  - "But Not for Me"

A part of the first movement of Mozart's Symphony No. 40 is heard in a concert scene.

== Release ==
Manhattan premiered at the Ziegfeld Theatre in New York City on April 18, 1979. It opened in 27 theaters in New York City, Los Angeles and Toronto on April 25, then expanded to an additional 256 theaters nationwide on May 4, before adding a further 117 screens a week later. The film was shown out of competition at the 1979 Cannes Film Festival in May.

== Reception ==
=== Box office ===
The film grossed $485,734 ($16,749 per screen) in its opening weekend and after expanding nationwide, it had grossed $3.5 million after 13 days. It grossed $39.9 million in its entire run in the United States and Canada, making the film the 17th highest-grossing picture of the year. Adjusted for ticket price inflation (as of 2017), Manhattan grossed $141,484,800, making it Allen's second biggest box-office hit, following 1977's Annie Hall.

=== Critical response ===
The film received largely positive reviews and holds a rating of 93% on Rotten Tomatoes based on reviews from 71 critics, with an average rating of 8.5/10. The website's consensus reads: "One of Woody Allen's early classics, Manhattan combines modern, bittersweet humor and timeless romanticism with unerring grace." On Metacritic it has a weighted average score of 83% based on 10 critics' reviews, indicating "universal acclaim".

Gary Arnold, in The Washington Post, wrote: "Manhattan has comic integrity in part because Allen is now making jokes at the expense of his own parochialism. There's no opportunity to heap condescending abuse on the phonies and sell-outs decorating the Hollywood landscape. The result appears to be a more authentic and magnanimous comic perception of human vanity and foolhardiness."

In his review for Newsweek, Jack Kroll wrote: "Allen's growth in every department is lovely to behold. He gets excellent performances from his cast. The increasing visual beauty of his films is part of their grace and sweetness, their balance between Allen's yearning romanticism and his tough eye for the fatuous and sentimental – a balance also expressed in his best screen play [sic] yet."

In his contemporary review for the Chicago Sun-Times, Roger Ebert, who gave the film three and a half out of four stars at the time but gave it a full four in a 2001 retrospective review, wrote: "Diane Keaton gives us a fresh and nicely edged New York intellectual. And Mariel Hemingway deserves some kind of special award for what's in some ways the most difficult role in the film." Ebert included the film in his list of The Great Movies. Gene Siskel of the Chicago Tribune awarded it four out of four stars, calling it "a remarkable motion picture. Manhattan may turn out to be the year's best comedy and drama."

Vincent Canby of The New York Times called the film "extraordinarily fine and funny" with "superb" performances from Keaton and Hemingway. Charles Champlin of the Los Angeles Times called it "harder, harsher, crueler, deeper-going, more assertive but in the end no less life-affirming than Annie Hall", and declared Manhattan "even better" than that film.

Stanley Kauffmann of The New Republic wrote: "Manhattan is a faulty film, but it's moderately amusing". Alexander Walker of the London Evening Standard wrote: "So precisely nuanced is the speech, so subtle the behaviour of a group of friends, lovers, mistresses and cuckolds who keep splitting up and pairing off like unstable molecules".

==== Retrospective reviews and lists ====
In 2007, J. Hoberman wrote in The Village Voice: "The New York City that Woody so tediously defended in Annie Hall was in crisis. And so he imagined an improved version. More than that, he cast this shining city in the form of those movies that he might have seen as a child in Coney Island—freeing the visions that he sensed to be locked up in the silver screen."

In October 2013, readers of The Guardian voted it the best film directed by Woody Allen.

=== Accolades ===
Association	Year	Category	Recipient(s)	Result	Ref.
Academy Awards	1979	Best Supporting Actress	Mariel Hemingway	Nominated	
Academy Awards	1979	Best Original Screenplay	Woody Allen and Marshall Brickman	Nominated	
British Academy Film Awards	1979	Best Film		Won	
British Academy Film Awards	1979	Best Direction	Woody Allen	Nominated	
British Academy Film Awards	1979	Best Actor	Woody Allen	Nominated	
British Academy Film Awards	1979	Best Actress	Diane Keaton	Nominated	
British Academy Film Awards	1979	Best Supporting Actress	Mariel Hemingway	Nominated	
British Academy Film Awards	1979	Best Supporting Actress	Meryl Streep	Nominated	
British Academy Film Awards	1979	Best Screenplay	Woody Allen	Won	
British Academy Film Awards	1979	Best Cinematography	Gordon Willis	Nominated	
British Academy Film Awards	1979	Best Editing	Susan E. Morse	Nominated	
British Academy Film Awards	1979	Best Sound	James Sabat, Dan Sable, and Jack Higgins	Nominated	
César Award	1979	Best Foreign Film	Woody Allen	Won	
Golden Globe Awards	1979	Best Motion Picture - Drama		Nominated	
Directors Guild of America Awards	1979	Outstanding Directorial Achievement in Motion Pictures	Woody Allen	Nominated	
National Society of Film Critics	1979	Best Film		3rd Place	
National Society of Film Critics	1979	Best Director	Woody Allen (Note: tied with Robert Benton, who directed Kramer vs. Kramer)	Won	
National Society of Film Critics	1979	Best Actress	Diane Keaton	4th Place	
National Society of Film Critics	1979	Best Supporting Actress	Meryl Streep (Note: tied for her work in Kramer v. Kramer and The Seduction of Joe Tynan)	Won	
National Society of Film Critics	1979	Best Screenplay	Woody Allen and Marshall Brickman	2nd Place	
National Society of Film Critics	1979	Best Cinematography	Gordon Willis	Nominated	
New York Film Critics Circle	1979	Best Film		Nominated	
New York Film Critics Circle	1979	Best Director	Woody Allen	Won	
New York Film Critics Circle	1979	Best Screenplay	Woody Allen and Marshall Brickman	Nominated	
Writers Guild of America Awards	1979	Best Comedy Written Directly for the Screen	Woody Allen and Marshall Brickman	Nominated	

In 2006, Writers Guild of America West ranked the film's screenplay 54th in WGA's list of 101 Greatest Screenplays. In Empire's 2008 poll of the 500 greatest movies ever made, Manhattan was ranked 76th. The New York Times placed the film on its Best 1000 Movies Ever list. The film was 63rd on Bravo's "100 Funniest Movies" list. In 2001, the United States Library of Congress deemed it "culturally, historically or aesthetically significant" and selected it for preservation in the National Film Registry. It is also 4th on Rotten Tomatoes' list of the 25 Best Romantic Comedies.

The film is recognized by American Film Institute in these lists:

- 2000: AFI's 100 Years...100 Laughs – #46
- 2002: AFI's 100 Years...100 Passions – #66

== Home media ==
Allen wanted to preserve Willis's compositions and insisted that the aspect ratio be preserved when the film was released on video (an unusual request in a time when widescreen films were normally panned and scanned for TV and video release). As a result, all copies of the film on video (and most television broadcasts) were letterboxed, originally with a gray border.

Manhattan was first released on Blu-ray on January 24, 2012, alongside Allen's 1977 film Annie Hall. Both releases included the films' original theatrical trailer.

== Legacy ==
Manhattan's screenplay was performed in front of a live audience at the Los Angeles County Museum of Art on November 15, 2012, as part of Jason Reitman's Live Read series. Actors read the script, narrowed to six speaking parts, and still photographs from the movie were projected behind them. The cast included Stephen Merchant as Isaac Davis, Olivia Munn as Mary Wilkie, Shailene Woodley as Tracy, Michael Murphy reprising his role as Yale Pollack, Mae Whitman as Emily Pollack, Erika Christensen as Jill Davis, and Jason Mantzoukas as Dennis. In keeping with the project's focus on impermanence and spontaneity, there were no rehearsals, shows were announced only days prior, and the names of some cast members were withheld entirely; performances were not recorded.

Manhattan's portrayal of a middle-aged man dating a teenager, which drew little criticism at the time of its release, attracted more scrutiny in the late 2010s as Allen's reputation came into question in the wake of renewed sexual abuse allegations by his daughter Dylan Farrow.

== Bibliography ==
- Baxter, John (1999). Woody Allen: A Biography (Revised paperback ed.). London: Harper Collins. ISBN 0-00-638794-2.
- Bjorkman, Stig (1995) [1993]. Woody Allen on Woody Allen. London: Faber and Faber. ISBN 0-571-17335-7.
- Brode, Douglas (1987). Woody Allen: His Films and Career. Citadel Press.
- Fox, Julian (1996). Woody: Movies from Manhattan. Overlook. ISBN 0879516925.
- Palmer, Myles (1980). Woody Allen. Proteus.
