= Radio Days =

1987 film by Woody Allen

- Theatrical release poster by Brian Hamill
- Directed by: Woody Allen
- Written by: Woody Allen
- Produced by: Robert Greenhut
- Starring: Mia Farrow; Dianne Wiest; Julie Kavner; Michael Tucker; Wallace Shawn; Seth Green
- Cinematography: Carlo Di Palma
- Edited by: Susan E. Morse
- Music by: Dick Hyman
- Distributed by: Orion Pictures
- Release date: January 30, 1987
- Running time: 85 minutes
- Country: United States
- Language: English
- Budget: $16 million
- Box office: $14.8 million

Radio Days is a 1987 American semi-autobiographical comedy-drama film written and directed by Woody Allen. It is a nostalgic look at the golden age of radio during the late 1930s and 1940s, focusing on a working-class family living in Rockaway Beach, New York. The film weaves together vignettes, blending the lives of the family members with the radio programs they listen to daily. It has an ensemble cast.

== Plot ==
The film is narrated by the fictional Joe, voiced by Allen. Joe begins by relating how two burglars got involved in a radio game show after answering a random phone call during a home burglary; the burglars ransacked the house but the residents won the game show prizes. He goes on to explain that he associates old radio songs with childhood memories.

During the late 1930s and early 1940s young Joe lived with his modest Jewish-American family in Rockaway Beach. His mother always listened to Breakfast with Irene and Roger. His father kept his occupation secret. Joe later found out that he was ashamed of being a taxi driver, which Joe thought was neat. Other family members were Uncle Abe and Aunt Ceil, cousin Ruthie, grandpa and grandma, and Aunt Bea. The latter was a serial dater, always on the lookout for a potential husband but either was too picky or dated married men.

Joe's favorite radio show was The Masked Avenger. It made him dream of buying a secret decoder ring. In Joe's fantasy, the Masked Avenger looked like a hero, but in reality the voice actor (Wallace Shawn) was short and bald. Other radio memories are stories about sporting heroes, news bulletins about World War II, a report of a Martian invasion (similar to the real 1938 radio broadcast) and a live report of the search for a little girl who fell into a well (similar to the real incidents of Kathy Fiscus and Floyd Collins).

Joe and his school friends searched for German aircraft from local rooftops, but instead saw a woman undressing through a window. She later turned out to be their substitute teacher. Alone on the coast Joe saw a German U-boat, but he decided not to tell anyone because they wouldn't believe him. Joe was fascinated by the glamour of Manhattan, where the radio broadcasts were made. He visited the Radio City Music Hall, and described it as the most beautiful thing he ever saw.

Joe collected stories of radio stars, including that of Sally White, whose dreams of becoming famous were hampered by her shrill voice and Brooklyn accent. Starting as a cigar salesgirl, she got stuck on the roof of the radio building with Roger, who was cheating on Irene. After she witnessed a crime the gangster Rocco wanted to kill her but following his mother's advice he ended up using his connections to further her career. She takes speech classes and finally became a reporter of celebrity gossip.

On New Year's Eve Joe was brought down from his room to celebrate the 1944 New Year. Simultaneously the radio stars gathered on the roof of their building. The narrator concludes that he will never forget those radio voices, although with each New Year's Eve they seem to glow dimmer and dimmer.

== Cast ==
- Woody Allen as Joe, the Narrator
  - Seth Green as Young Joe
- Mia Farrow as Sally White
- Dianne Wiest as Aunt Bea
- Julie Kavner as Tess, Joe's mother
- Michael Tucker as Martin, Joe's father
- Josh Mostel as Uncle Abe
- Renée Lippin as Aunt Ceil
- Leah Carrey as Grandma
- Joy Newman as cousin Ruthie
- Wallace Shawn as Masked Avenger
- Julie Kurnitz as Irene Draper
- David Warrilow as Roger Daley
- Danny Aiello as Rocco
- Jeff Daniels as Biff Baxter
- Hy Anzell as Mr. Waldbaum
- Sydney Blake as Miss Gordon
- Larry David as Communist Neighbor
- Gina DeAngelis as Rocco's mother
- Denise Dumont as Latin singer
- Todd Field as Crooner
- Kitty Carlisle Hart as Maxwell House (Coffee) Radio Jingle Singer
- Paul Herman as Burglar
- Robert Joy as Fred
- Diane Keaton as New Year's Singer
- William Magerman as Grandpa
- Judith Malina as Mrs. Waldbaum
- Brian Mannain as Kirby Kyle
- Kenneth Mars as Rabbi Baumel
- Helen Miller as Mrs. Needleman
- Don Pardo as "Guess That Tune" Host
- Tony Roberts as "Silver Dollar" Emcee
- Martin Rosenblatt as Mr. Needleman
- Rebecca Schaeffer as Communists' Daughter
- Roger Schwinghammer as Richard
- Martin Sherman as Mr. Abercrombie
- Mike Starr as Burglar
- Richard Portnow as Sy
- Jackson Beck as voice of radio reporter
- William H. Macy as Radio Voice
- Kenneth Welsh as Radio Voice

== Production ==
Radio Days was the most expensive film Woody Allen had made up to that point. Principal photography began on November 5, 1985, and ended in early May 1986. Filming took place in Manhattan, Rockaway, Queens, and Jersey City, New Jersey. The film premiered at the United States Film Festival in Park City, Utah on January 23, 1987, before its wide release on January 30.

The amusement park young Joe walks by in the film is the old Rockaway Playland located in Rockaway Beach, New York. The park was in its last year of operation when the film was being made and was subsequently closed and demolished.

== Music ==
The film's soundtrack, which features songs from the 1930s and 40s, plays an integral part in the plot. It was released in 1987 by RCA Victor on LP record through their Novus soundtrack imprint, and also on cassette and compact disc.

Track listing
No.	Title	Artist(s)	Length
1.	"In the Mood"	Glenn Miller	3:33
2.	"I Double Dare You"	Larry Clinton	2:49
3.	"Opus No. 1"	Tommy Dorsey	2:58
4.	"Frenesi"	Artie Shaw	3:01
5.	"The Donkey Serenade"	Allan Jones	3:21
6.	"Body and Soul"	Benny Goodman	3:26
7.	"You and I"	Tommy Dorsey	2:44
8.	"Remember Pearl Harbor"	Sammy Kaye	2:29
9.	"That Old Feeling"	Guy Lombardo	2:45
10.	"(There'll Be Bluebirds Over) The White Cliffs of Dover"	Glenn Miller	2:54
11.	"Goodbye"	Benny Goodman	3:31
12.	"I'm Getting Sentimental Over You"	Tommy Dorsey	3:38
13.	"Lullaby of Broadway"	Richard Himber	2:29
14.	"American Patrol"	Glenn Miller	3:33
15.	"Take the "A" Train"	Duke Ellington	3:00
16.	"One, Two, Three, Kick"	Xavier Cugat	3:23

== Release ==
The film was screened out of competition at the 1987 Cannes Film Festival.

=== Home media ===
Radio Days was released on DVD by MGM November 6, 2001. A limited edition Blu-ray of 3,000 units was later released by Twilight Time July 8, 2014.

== Reception ==
=== Critical response ===
Radio Days holds a 93% rating on Rotten Tomatoes, with an average score of 8.00/10 from 40 reviews, and a consensus summary stating: "Woody Allen at his most charmingly nostalgic."

In his four-star review, noted critic Roger Ebert of the Chicago Sun-Times described Radio Days as Allen's answer to Federico Fellini’s Amarcord and referred to it as "so ambitious and so audacious that it almost defies description. It's a kaleidoscope of dozens of characters, settings and scenes - the most elaborate production Allen has ever made - and it's inexhaustible, spinning out one delight after another." Vincent Canby of The New York Times referred to Allen as the "prodigal cinema resource" and spoke of the film saying, "Radio Days [...] is as free in form as it is generous of spirit."

David Denby wrote for New York that: "[...] The real glue, however, is the lullingly beautiful popular music of the period — Cole Porter, Dubin and Warren, big-band jazz, crooners, torch singers, Carmen Miranda. The music, perfectly matched to images of old wood and brick buildings and old glamour spots, produces a mood of distanced, bittersweet nostalgia. Radio Days becomes a gently satiric commemorations of forgotten lives." Variety called it "one of Allen's most purely entertaining pictures," adding that "Radio Days is not simply about nostalgia, but the quality of memory and how what one remembers informs one's present life."

In a poll held by Empire magazine of the 500 greatest films ever made, Radio Days was voted number 304.

Stanley Kubrick loved Radio Days so much that, according to his brother-in-law Jan Harlan, he watched it "twice within two days, because 'it was like watching a home movie,' he told me... He absolutely adored it."

== Awards and nominations ==
Year	Award	Category	Nomination	Result	Ref.
1987	Academy Awards	Best Original Screenplay	Woody Allen	Nominated	
1987	Academy Awards	Best Art Direction	Art Direction: Santo Loquasto; Set Decoration: Carol Joffe, Leslie Bloom, George DeTitta Jr.	Nominated	
1987	British Academy Film Awards	Best Film	Robert Greenhut, Woody Allen	Nominated	
1987	British Academy Film Awards	Best Supporting Actress	Dianne Wiest	Nominated	
1987	British Academy Film Awards	Best Original Screenplay	Woody Allen	Nominated	
1987	British Academy Film Awards	Best Production Design	Santo Loquasto	Won	
1987	British Academy Film Awards	Best Costume Design	Jeffery Kurland	Won	
1987	British Academy Film Awards	Best Editing	Susan E. Morse	Nominated	
1987	British Academy Film Awards	Best Sound	Robert Hein, James Sabat, Lee Dichter	Nominated	
1987	Writers Guild of America Awards	Best Original Screenplay	Woody Allen	Nominated	

== See also ==
- List of films set around New Year
- List of films set around Halloween
