= Woody Allen filmography =

List of films by American director

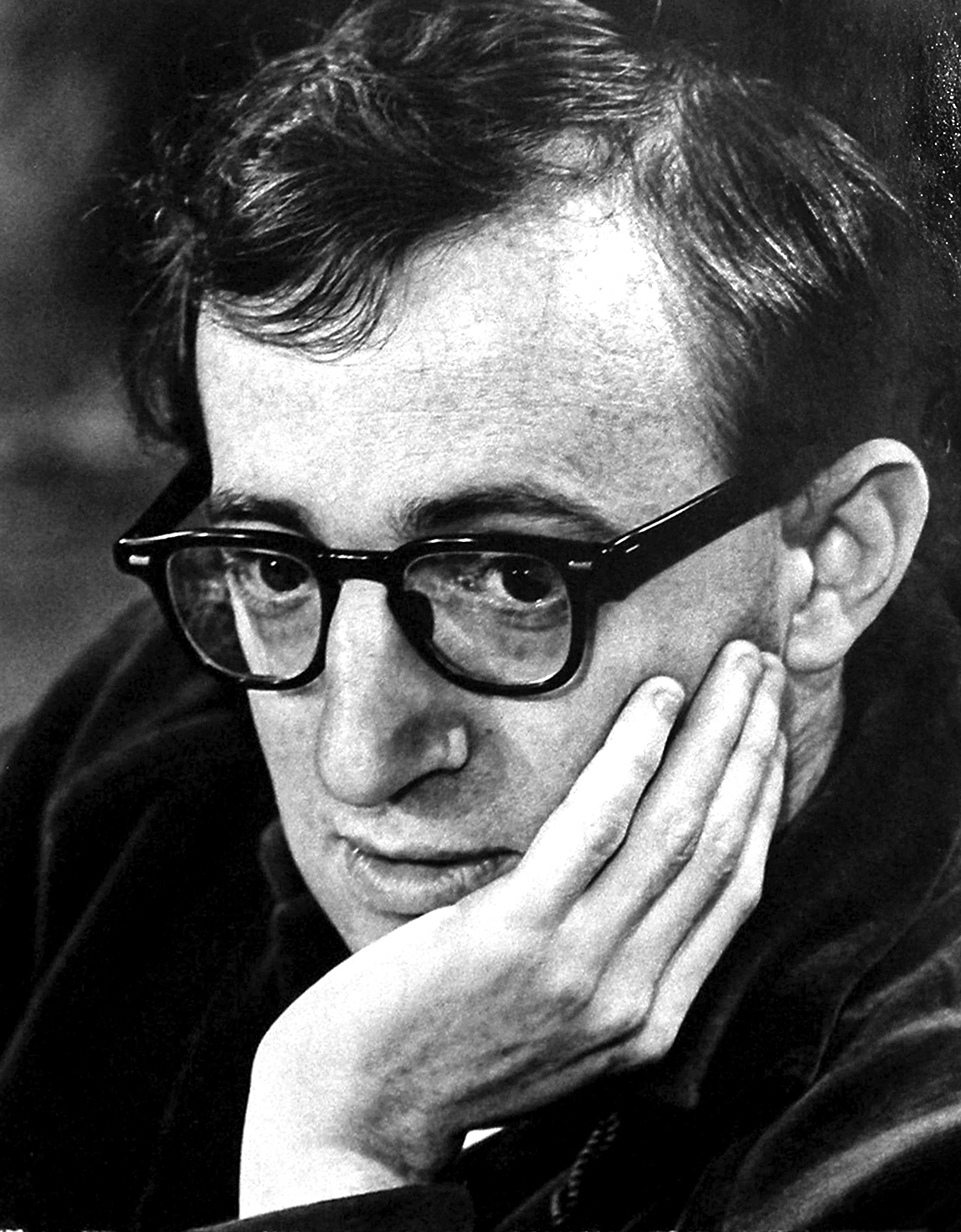
Allen in the early 1970s

Woody Allen is an American director, writer, actor, and comedian. In a career spanning more than five decades, he has acted in, directed, and written many films starting in the 1960s. His first film was the comedy What's New Pussycat? (1965), which featured him as both writer and performer. Feeling that his New Yorker humor clashed with director Clive Donner's British sensibility, he decided to direct all future films from his own material. He was unable to prevent other directors from producing films based on previous stage plays of his to which he had already sold the film rights, notably the successful film Play it Again, Sam (1972) from the 1969 play of the same title directed by Herbert Ross.

Allen's directorial debut, What's Up, Tiger Lily? (1966), was a dramatic Japanese spy movie re-dubbed in English with completely new, comedic dialog. He continued to write, direct, and star in comedic slapstick films such as Take the Money and Run (1969), Bananas (1971) and Sleeper (1973), before finding widespread critical acclaim for his romantic comedies Annie Hall (1977) and Manhattan (1979); he won Academy Awards for Best Director and Best Original Screenplay for the former. Despite being influenced by European art cinema and venturing into more dramatic territory, with Interiors (1978) and Another Woman (1988) being prime examples of this transition, he continued to direct several comedies.

In addition to works of fiction, Allen appeared as himself in many documentaries and other works of non-fiction, including Stanley Kubrick: A Life in Pictures, Wild Man Blues and The Concert for New York City. He has also been the subject of and appeared in three documentaries about himself, including To Woody Allen, From Europe with Love in 1980, Woody Allen: A Life in Film in 2001 and the 2011 PBS American Masters documentary, Woody Allen: a Documentary (directed by Robert B. Weide). He also wrote for and contributed to a number of television series early in his career, including The Tonight Show as guest host.

According to Box Office Mojo, Allen's films have grossed a total of more than $575 million, with an average of $14 million per film (domestic gross figures as a director). Currently, all of the films he directed for American International Pictures, United Artists and Orion Pictures between 1965 and 1992 are owned by Metro-Goldwyn-Mayer, which acquired all the studios in separate transactions. The films he directed by ABC Pictures are now property of American Broadcasting Company, who in turn licensed their home video rights to MGM.

== Films ==
=== Feature films ===
| Year | Title | Director | Writer | Actor | Role | Ref. |
|---|---|---|---|---|---|---|
| 1965 | What's New Pussycat? | No | Yes | Yes | Victor Shakapopulis | |
| 1966 | What's Up, Tiger Lily? | Yes | Yes | Yes | Himself / Various voices | |
| 1967 | Casino Royale | No | No | Yes | Dr. Noah / Jimmy Bond | |
| 1969 | Take the Money and Run | Yes | Yes | Yes | Virgil Starkwell | |
| 1969 | Don't Drink the Water | No | Yes | No | —N/a | |
| 1971 | Bananas | Yes | Yes | Yes | Fielding Mellish | |
| 1972 | Play It Again, Sam | No | Yes | Yes | Allan Felix | ^{[I]} |
| 1972 | Everything You Always Wanted to Know About Sex* (*But Were Afraid to Ask) | Yes | Yes | Yes | Victor Shakapopulis / Fabrizio / The Fool / Sperm #1 | |
| 1973 | Sleeper | Yes | Yes | Yes | Miles Monroe | |
| 1975 | Love and Death | Yes | Yes | Yes | Boris Grushenko | |
| 1976 | The Front | No | No | Yes | Howard Prince | |
| 1977 | Annie Hall | Yes | Yes | Yes | Alvy Singer | |
| 1978 | Interiors | Yes | Yes | No | —N/a | |
| 1979 | Manhattan | Yes | Yes | Yes | Isaac Davis | |
| 1980 | Stardust Memories | Yes | Yes | Yes | Sandy Bates | |
| 1982 | A Midsummer Night's Sex Comedy | Yes | Yes | Yes | Andrew | |
| 1983 | Zelig | Yes | Yes | Yes | Leonard Zelig | |
| 1984 | Broadway Danny Rose | Yes | Yes | Yes | Danny Rose | |
| 1985 | The Purple Rose of Cairo | Yes | Yes | No | —N/a | |
| 1986 | Hannah and Her Sisters | Yes | Yes | Yes | Mickey Sachs | |
| 1987 | Radio Days | Yes | Yes | Yes | Joe (voice) | |
| 1987 | King Lear | No | No | Yes | Mr. Alien (cameo) | |
| 1987 | September | Yes | Yes | No | —N/a | |
| 1988 | Another Woman | Yes | Yes | No | —N/a | |
| 1989 | New York Stories | Partial | Partial | Yes | Sheldon Mills | |
| 1989 | Crimes and Misdemeanors | Yes | Yes | Yes | Cliff Stern | |
| 1990 | Alice | Yes | Yes | No | —N/a | |
| 1991 | Scenes from a Mall | No | No | Yes | Nick Fifer | |
| 1991 | Shadows and Fog | Yes | Yes | Yes | Kleinman | |
| 1992 | Husbands and Wives | Yes | Yes | Yes | Gabe Roth | |
| 1993 | Manhattan Murder Mystery | Yes | Yes | Yes | Larry Lipton | |
| 1994 | Bullets Over Broadway | Yes | Yes | No | —N/a | |
| 1995 | Mighty Aphrodite | Yes | Yes | Yes | Lenny Weinrib | |
| 1996 | Everyone Says I Love You | Yes | Yes | Yes | Joe Berlin | |
| 1997 | Wild Man Blues | No | No | Yes | Documentary about Allen as a musician (clarinet) on tour with his New Orleans Jazz Band. | |
| 1997 | Deconstructing Harry | Yes | Yes | Yes | Harry Block | |
| 1998 | Antz | No | Uncredited | Yes | Z-4195 (voice) | |
| 1998 | The Impostors | No | No | Uncredited | Audition Director (cameo) | |
| 1998 | Celebrity | Yes | Yes | No | —N/a | |
| 1999 | Sweet and Lowdown | Yes | Yes | Yes | Himself | |
| 2000 | Company Man | No | No | Uncredited | Lowther (cameo) | |
| 2000 | Small Time Crooks | Yes | Yes | Yes | Ray | |
| 2000 | Picking Up the Pieces | No | No | Yes | Tex Crowley | |
| 2001 | The Curse of the Jade Scorpion | Yes | Yes | Yes | C.W. Briggs | |
| 2002 | Hollywood Ending | Yes | Yes | Yes | Val Waxman | |
| 2003 | Anything Else | Yes | Yes | Yes | David Dobel | |
| 2004 | Melinda and Melinda | Yes | Yes | No | —N/a | |
| 2005 | Match Point | Yes | Yes | No | —N/a | |
| 2006 | Scoop | Yes | Yes | Yes | Sid Waterman | |
| 2007 | Cassandra's Dream | Yes | Yes | No | —N/a | |
| 2008 | Vicky Cristina Barcelona | Yes | Yes | No | —N/a | |
| 2009 | Whatever Works | Yes | Yes | No | —N/a | |
| 2010 | You Will Meet a Tall Dark Stranger | Yes | Yes | No | —N/a | |
| 2011 | Midnight in Paris | Yes | Yes | No | —N/a | |
| 2012 | Paris-Manhattan | No | No | Yes | Himself (cameo) | |
| 2012 | To Rome with Love | Yes | Yes | Yes | Jerry | |
| 2013 | Blue Jasmine | Yes | Yes | No | —N/a | |
| 2013 | Fading Gigolo | No | No | Yes | Murray Schwartz | |
| 2014 | Magic in the Moonlight | Yes | Yes | No | —N/a | |
| 2015 | Irrational Man | Yes | Yes | No | —N/a | |
| 2016 | Café Society | Yes | Yes | Yes | Narrator (voice) | |
| 2017 | Wonder Wheel | Yes | Yes | No | —N/a | |
| 2019 | A Rainy Day in New York | Yes | Yes | No | —N/a | |
| 2020 | Rifkin's Festival | Yes | Yes | No | —N/a | |
| 2023 | Coup de Chance | Yes | Yes | No | —N/a | |
| 2027 | Mad In Madrid | Yes | Yes | No | —N/a | |

=== Short films ===
| Year | Title | Director | Writer | Actor | Role | Notes | Ref. |
|---|---|---|---|---|---|---|---|
| 1971 | Men of Crisis: The Harvey Wallinger Story | Yes | Yes | Yes | Harvey Wallinger | | |
| 2001 | The Concert for New York City | Partial | Partial | No | —N/a | Segment: "Sounds from a Town I Love" | |
| TBA | Mr. Fischer’s Chair | No | No | Yes | Narrator | Animated short | |

== Television ==
| Year | Title | Director | Writer | Actor | Notes | Ref. |
|---|---|---|---|---|---|---|
| 1950–1955 | The Colgate Comedy Hour | No | Yes | No | | |
| 1956 | Caesar's Hour | No | Yes | No | | |
| 1956 | Stanley | No | Yes | No | | |
| 1960 | General Electric Theater | No | Yes | No | Episode: "Hooray for Love" | |
| 1960 | Candid Camera | No | Yes | Yes | One Episode | |
| 1961 | The Garry Moore Show | No | Yes | No | | |
| 1962 | The Laughmakers | No | Yes | No | Unsold Pilot for ABC | |
| 1963 | The Sid Caesar Show | No | Uncredited | No | | |
| 1965 | The Woody Allen Show | No | Yes | Yes | Standup TV Special (UK) | |
| 1966 | Gene Kelly in New York, New York | No | Yes | No | TV special | |
| 1967 | Woody Allen Looks at 1967 | No | Yes | Yes | TV special | |
| 1969 | The Woody Allen Special | No | Yes | Yes | TV special | |
| 1979 | Bob Hope: My Favorite Comedian | Yes | Yes | unknown | Special | |
| 1994 | Don't Drink the Water | Yes | Yes | Yes | Remake of 1969 film of the same name | |
| 2016 | Crisis in Six Scenes | Yes | Yes | Yes | Also creator, Amazon | |

=== Acting roles ===
| Year | Title | Role | Notes | Ref |
|---|---|---|---|---|
| 1960 | Candid Camera | Himself | | |
| 1963–1967 | What's My Line? | Himself - Mystery Guest | 9 episodes | |
| 1964, 1967 | The Tonight Show Starring Johnny Carson | Guest host | 2 episodes | |
| 1965 | The Woody Allen Show | Himself | Standup Special | |
| 1966 | Gene Kelly in New York, New York | Himself | TV special | |
| 1969 | The Woody Allen Special | Himself, Various | TV special | |
| 1970–1971 | Hot Dog | Co-host | Documentary Series | |
| 1994 | Don't Drink the Water | Walter Hollander | TV movie | |
| 1996 | The Sunshine Boys | Al Lewis | TV movie | |
| 1997 | Just Shoot Me! | Himself (voice) | Episode: "My Dinner with Woody" | |
| 2001 | Stanley Kubrick: A Life in Pictures | Himself | Documentary | |
| 2002 | Woody Allen: A Life in Film | Himself | Documentary | |
| 2002 | The Magic of Fellini | Himself | Documentary | |
| 2011 | Woody Allen: A Documentary; American Masters (PBS & WNET) | Himself | 2 part Documentary | |
| 2013 | Marvin Hamlisch: What He Did for Love | Himself | Documentary | |
| 2013 | David Blaine: Real or Magic | Himself | Television Special | |
| 2013 | AFI Life Achievement Tribute: Mel Brooks | Himself | Television Special | |
| 2016 | Crisis in Six Scenes | Sidney Muntzinger | Amazon Miniseries; 6 episodes | |
| 2017 | AFI Life Achievement Tribute: Diane Keaton | Himself | Television Special, TNT | |
| 2017 | This is Bob Hope | Himself | Documentary | |
| 2018 | Always at the Carlyle | Himself | Documentary | |
| 2019 | Very Ralph | Himself | Documentary | |
| 2020 | What She Said: The Art of Pauline Kael | Himself | Documentary | |

== Discography ==
- Woody Allen (Colpix Records, 1964)
- Woody Allen Vol. 2 (Colpix Records, 1965)
- The Third Woody Allen Album (Capitol Records, 1968)
- The Nightclub Years 1964–1968 (United Artists Records, 1972)
- Play It Again, Sam (Paramount Records, 1972) Film Soundtrack, Dialogue and Music
- Standup Comic (United Artists Records, 1978)
- The Bunk Project (Jazz Heritage, 1993) Traditional Jazz
- Wild Man Blues (RCA Victor, 1998) Film Soundtrack
- Woody Allen On Comedy (Laugh, 2001) Interview
- Davis, Allen & Fowkes (with a string ensemble) (New York Jazz Records, 2005)

== Reception ==
Some ratings are based on less than 20 reviews and may not necessarily reflect the sentiments of the general audience.

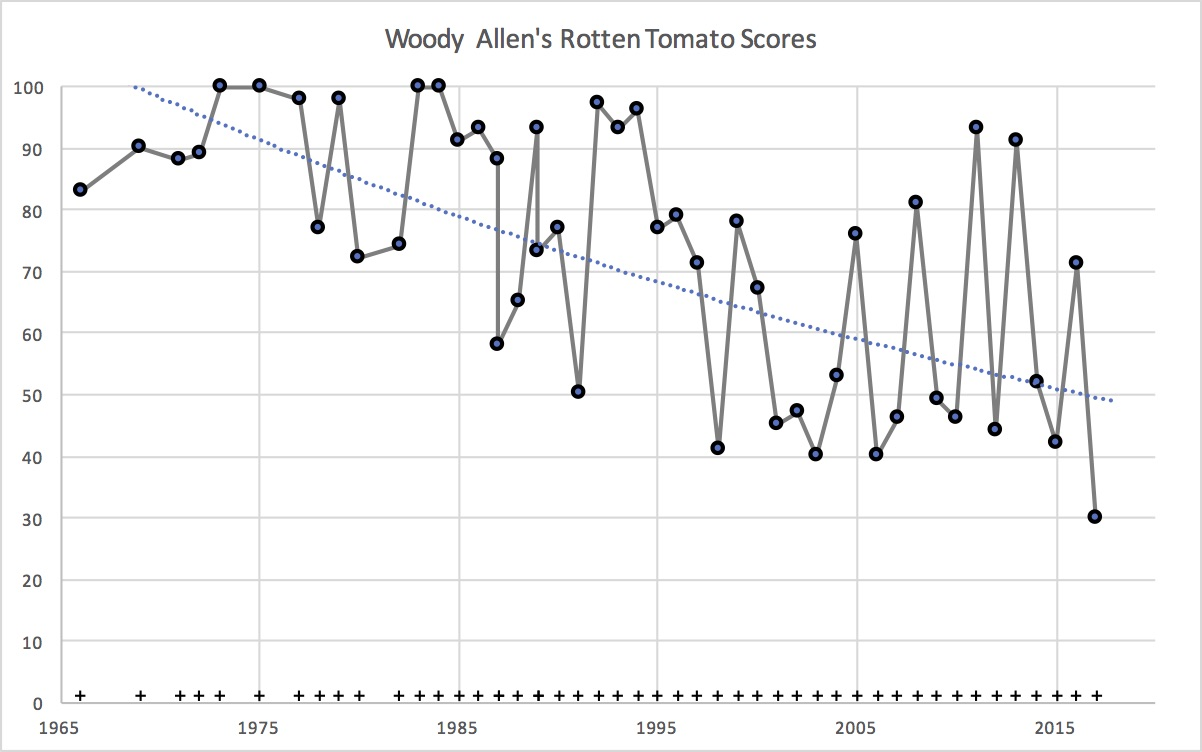
Movies directed by Allen shown by year and Rotten Tomatoes score.

| Year | Title | Grossed | Rotten Tomatoes |
|---|---|---|---|
| 1965 | What's New Pussycat? | —N/a | 28% |
| 1966 | What's Up, Tiger Lily? | —N/a | 81% |
| 1969 | Don't Drink the Water | —N/a | 44% |
| 1969 | Take the Money and Run | —N/a | 91% |
| 1971 | Bananas | —N/a | 83% |
| 1972 | Play It Again, Sam | —N/a | 97% |
| 1972 | Everything You Always Wanted to Know About Sex* (*But Were Afraid to Ask) | $83,934,700 | 88% |
| 1973 | Sleeper | $82,084,900 | 100% |
| 1975 | Love and Death | $77,746,400 | 100% |
| 1977 | Annie Hall | $135,852,600 | 97% |
| 1978 | Interiors | $35,309,500 | 81% |
| 1979 | Manhattan | $126,047,200 | 94% |
| 1980 | Stardust Memories | $30,587,700 | 68% |
| 1982 | A Midsummer Night's Sex Comedy | $24,453,100 | 74% |
| 1983 | Zelig | $29,665,100 | 97% |
| 1984 | Broadway Danny Rose | $24,986,900 | 100% |
| 1985 | The Purple Rose of Cairo | $23,718,300 | 92% |
| 1986 | Hannah and Her Sisters | $85,057,900 | 91% |
| 1987 | Radio Days | $29,963,900 | 91% |
| 1987 | September | $985,300 | 63% |
| 1988 | Another Woman | $3,109,700 | 59% |
| 1989 | New York Stories | $10,700,000 | 75% |
| 1989 | Crimes and Misdemeanors | $36,417,400 | 92% |
| 1990 | Alice | $13,791,700 | 71% |
| 1991 | Shadows and Fog | $2,735,731 | 54% |
| 1992 | Husbands and Wives | $10,555,619 | 93% |
| 1993 | Manhattan Murder Mystery | $21,676,500 | 94% |
| 1994 | Bullets Over Broadway | $25,358,700 | 95% |
| 1995 | Mighty Aphrodite | $25,985,927 | 78% |
| 1996 | Everyone Says I Love You | $34,588,635 | 77% |
| 1997 | Deconstructing Harry | $18,046,900 | 73% |
| 1998 | Antz | $171,757,863 | 92% |
| 1998 | Celebrity | $6,153,836 | 42% |
| 1999 | Sweet and Lowdown | $6,231,400 | 77% |
| 2000 | Small Time Crooks | $29,934,477 | 66% |
| 2001 | The Curse of the Jade Scorpion | $18,496,522 | 45% |
| 2002 | Hollywood Ending | $14,839,383 | 47% |
| 2003 | Anything Else | $13,203,044 | 40% |
| 2004 | Melinda and Melinda | $19,826,280 | 51% |
| 2005 | Match Point | $87,989,926 | 77% |
| 2006 | Scoop | $40,107,018 | 41% |
| 2007 | Cassandra's Dream | $22,539,685 | 46% |
| 2008 | Vicky Cristina Barcelona | $104,504,817 | 80% |
| 2009 | Whatever Works | $35,106,706 | 50% |
| 2010 | You Will Meet a Tall Dark Stranger | $34,275,987 | 46% |
| 2011 | Midnight in Paris | $162,942,835 | 93% |
| 2012 | To Rome with Love | $74,363,777 | 46% |
| 2013 | Blue Jasmine | $102,912,961 | 91% |
| 2014 | Magic in the Moonlight | $51,029,361 | 51% |
| 2015 | Irrational Man | $27,938,377 | 46% |
| 2016 | Café Society | $43,429,116 | 71% |
| 2017 | Wonder Wheel | $15,899,124 | 31% |
| 2019 | A Rainy Day in New York | $21,071,507 | 47% |
| 2020 | Rifkin's Festival | $2,228,001 | 41% |
| 2023 | Coup de Chance | $7,427,878 | 82% |

== Recurring collaborators ==
Like most directors, Allen has cast certain actors multiple times. He has most frequently worked with Mia Farrow (13 films); Peter McRobbie (8 films); Diane Keaton, Tony Sirico, and Fred Melamed (7 films each); Julie Kavner, Tony Darrow and Wallace Shawn (6 films each); Judy Davis, Dianne Wiest, Louise Lasser, Paul Herman, Douglas McGrath, Tony Roberts and David Ogden Stiers (5 films each); Sam Waterston and Caroline Aaron (4 films each).

| Work Actor | 1966 | 1969 | 1971 | 1972 | 1973 | 1975 | 1977 | 1978 | 1979 | 1980 | 1982 | 1983 | 1984 | 1985 | 1986 | 1987 | | 1988 | 1989 | | 1990 | 1991 | 1992 | 1993 | 1994 | 1995 | 1996 | 1997 | 1998 | 1999 | 2000 | 2001 | 2002 | 2003 | 2004 | 2005 | 2006 | 2007 | 2008 | 2009 | 2010 | 2011 | 2012 | 2013 | 2014 | 2015 | 2016 | 2017 | 2019 | 2020 | 2023 | —N/a |
| Work Actor | What's Up, Tiger Lily? | Take the Money and Run | Bananas | Everything You Always Wanted to Know About Sex*(*But Were Afraid to Ask) | Sleeper | Love and Death | Annie Hall | Interiors | Manhattan | Stardust Memories | A Midsummer Night's Sex Comedy | Zelig | Broadway Danny Rose | The Purple Rose of Cairo | Hannah and Her Sisters | Radio Days | September | Another Woman | New York Stories | Crimes and Misdemeanors | Alice | Shadows and Fog | Husbands and Wives | Manhattan Murder Mystery | Bullets Over Broadway | Mighty Aphrodite | Everyone Says I Love You | Deconstructing Harry | Celebrity | Sweet and Lowdown | Small Time Crooks | The Curse of the Jade Scorpion | Hollywood Ending | Anything Else | Melinda and Melinda | Match Point | Scoop | Cassandra's Dream | Vicky Cristina Barcelona | Whatever Works | You Will Meet a Tall Dark Stranger | Midnight in Paris | To Rome with Love | Blue Jasmine | Magic in the Moonlight | Irrational Man | Café Society | Wonder Wheel | A Rainy Day in New York | Rifkin's Festival | Coup de Chance | Total |
|---|---|---|---|---|---|---|---|---|---|---|---|---|---|---|---|---|---|---|---|---|---|---|---|---|---|---|---|---|---|---|---|---|---|---|---|---|---|---|---|---|---|---|---|---|---|---|---|---|---|---|---|---|
| Louise Lasser | Yes | Yes | Yes | Yes | | | | | | Yes | | | | | | | | | | | | | | | | | | | | | | | | | | | | | | | | | | | | | | | | | | 5 |
| Dan Frazer | | Yes | Yes | | | | | | | | | | | | | | | | | | | | | | | | | Yes | | | | | | | | | | | | | | | | | | | | | | | | 3 |
| Diane Keaton | | | | | Yes | Yes | Yes | Yes | Yes | | | | | | | Yes | | | | | | | | Yes | | | | | | | | | | | | | | | | | | | | | | | | | | | | 7 |
| Tony Roberts | | | | | | | Yes | | | Yes | Yes | | | | Yes | Yes | | | | | | | | | | | | | | | | | | | | | | | | | | | | | | | | | | | | 5 |
| Sam Waterston | | | | | | | | Yes | | | | | | | Yes | | Yes | | | Yes | | | | | | | | | | | | | | | | | | | | | | | | | | | | | | | | 4 |
| Frances Conroy | | | | | | | | | Yes | | | | | | | | | Yes | | Yes | | | | | | | | | | | | | | | | | | | | | | | | | | | | | | | | 3 |
| Wallace Shawn | | | | | | | | | Yes | | | | | | | Yes | | | | | | Yes | | | | | | | | | | Yes | | | Yes | | | | | | | | | | | | | | | Yes | | 6 |
| John Rothman | | | | | | | | | | Yes | | Yes | | Yes | | | | | | | | | | | | | | | | | | | | | | | | | | | | | | | | | | | | | | 3 |
| Mia Farrow | | | | | | | | | | | Yes | Yes | Yes | Yes | Yes | Yes | Yes | Yes | Yes | Yes | Yes | Yes | Yes | | | | | | | | | | | | | | | | | | | | | | | | | | | | | 13 |
| Peter McRobbie | | | | | | | | | | | | Yes | | Yes | | | | | | | | Yes | | | Yes | Yes | | Yes | Yes | | Yes | | | | | | | | | | | | | | | | | | | | | 8 |
| Camille Saviola | | | | | | | | | | | | | Yes | Yes | | | | | | | | Yes | | | | | | | | | | | | | | | | | | | | | | | | | | | | | | 3 |
| Danny Aiello | | | | | | | | | | | | | Yes | Yes | | Yes | | | | | | | | | | | | | | | | | | | | | | | | | | | | | | | | | | | | 3 |
| Dianne Wiest | | | | | | | | | | | | | | Yes | Yes | Yes | Yes | | | | | | | | Yes | | | | | | | | | | | | | | | | | | | | | | | | | | | 5 |
| Paul Herman | | | | | | | | | | | | | | Yes | | Yes | | | Yes | | | | | | Yes | Yes | | | | | | | | | | | | | | | | | | | | | | | | | | 5 |
| Julie Kavner | | | | | | | | | | | | | | | Yes | Yes | | | Yes | | Yes | Yes | | | | | | Yes | | | | | | | | | | | | | | | | | | | | | | | | 6 |
| Fred Melamed | | | | | | | | | | | | | | | Yes | Yes | | Yes | | Yes | | Yes | Yes | | | | | | | | | | Yes | | | | | | | | | | | | | | | | | | | 7 |
| Larry David | | | | | | | | | | | | | | | | Yes | | | Yes | | | | | | | | | | | | | | | | | | | | | Yes | | | | | | | | | | | | 3 |
| Jack Warden | | | | | | | | | | | | | | | | | Yes | | | | | | | | Yes | Yes | | | | | | | | | | | | | | | | | | | | | | | | | | 3 |
| Blythe Danner | | | | | | | | | | | | | | | | | | Yes | | | Yes | | Yes | | | | | | | | | | | | | | | | | | | | | | | | | | | | | 3 |
| Philip Bosco | | | | | | | | | | | | | | | | | | Yes | | | | Yes | | | | | | Yes | | | | | | | | | | | | | | | | | | | | | | | | 3 |
| David Ogden Stiers | | | | | | | | | | | | | | | | | | Yes | | | | Yes | | | | Yes | Yes | | | | | Yes | | | | | | | | | | | | | | | | | | | | 5 |
| Alan Alda | | | | | | | | | | | | | | | | | | | | Yes | | | | Yes | | | Yes | | | | | | | | | | | | | | | | | | | | | | | | | 3 |
| Caroline Aaron | | | | | | | | | | | | | | | | | | | | Yes | Yes | | Yes | | | | | Yes | | | | | | | | | | | | | | | | | | | | | | | | 4 |
| Alec Baldwin | | | | | | | | | | | | | | | | | | | | | Yes | | | | | | | | | | | | | | | | | | | | | | Yes | Yes | | | | | | | | 3 |
| Judy Davis | | | | | | | | | | | | | | | | | | | | | Yes | | Yes | | | | | Yes | Yes | | | | | | | | | | | | | | Yes | | | | | | | | | 5 |
| Tony Darrow | | | | | | | | | | | | | | | | | | | | | | | | | Yes | Yes | | Yes | Yes | Yes | Yes | | | | | | | | | | | | | | | | | | | | | 6 |
| Tony Sirico | | | | | | | | | | | | | | | | | | | | | | | | | Yes | Yes | Yes | Yes | Yes | | | | | | | | | | | | | | | | | | Yes | Yes | | | | 7 |
| Julie Halston | | | | | | | | | | | | | | | | | | | | | | | | | | Yes | | | Yes | | Yes | | | | | | | | | | | | | | | | | | | | | 3 |
| Douglas McGrath | | | | | | | | | | | | | | | | | | | | | | | | | | | | | Yes | | Yes | | Yes | | | | | | | | | | | | | | Yes | | | Yes | | 5 |
| Larry Pine | | | | | | | | | | | | | | | | | | | | | | | | | | | | | Yes | | Yes | | | | Yes | | | | | | | | | | | | | | | | | 3 |
| Brian Markinson | | | | | | | | | | | | | | | | | | | | | | | | | | | | | | Yes | Yes | Yes | | | | | | | | | | | | | | | | | | | | 3 |
| Erica Leerhsen | | | | | | | | | | | | | | | | | | | | | | | | | | | | | | | | | Yes | Yes | | | | | | | | | | | Yes | | | | | | | 3 |
| Zak Orth | | | | | | | | | | | | | | | | | | | | | | | | | | | | | | | | | | | Yes | | | | Yes | | Yes | | | | | | | | | | | 3 |
| Scarlett Johansson | | | | | | | | | | | | | | | | | | | | | | | | | | | | | | | | | | | | Yes | Yes | | Yes | | | | | | | | | | | | | 3 |

== See also ==
- List of awards and nominations received by Woody Allen

== Bibliography ==
- "IMDb". Internet Movie Database.
- "Rotten Tomatoes". Rotten Tomatoes.
