= Unstuck in Time (disambiguation) =

Unstuck in Time is Jughead's Revenge's first studio album, released in 1990

Unstuck in Time may also refer to:

- Unstuck in Time: A Journey Through Kurt Vonnegut's Life and Novels, a 2011 book by Gregory D. Sumner
- Kurt Vonnegut: Unstuck in Time, 2021 American documentary film, directed by Robert B. Weide
- Unstuck in Time: On the Post-Soviet Uncanny. a 2024 book by Eliot Borenstein

== See also ==
- To Get Unstuck in Time
