= List of awards and nominations received by Candice Bergen =

List of Candice Bergen's awards
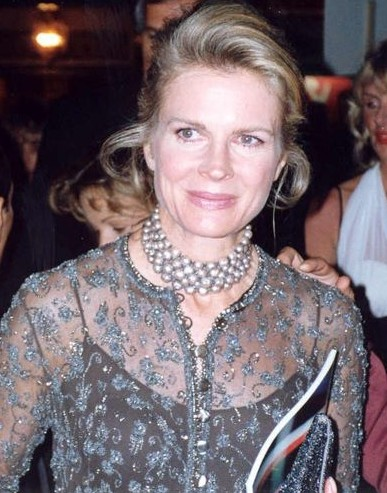
- Bergen at the 45th Primetime Emmy Awards, 1993.
Award	Wins	Nominations
Academy Awards	0	1
Golden Globe Awards	2	12
Primetime Emmy Awards	5	9
Screen Actors Guild Awards	0	8

The following is a list of awards and nominations received by Candice Bergen.

Bergen is a five-time Primetime Emmy Award winner for her portrayal as the title character on the long-running comedy series Murphy Brown. She was nominated for seven Primetime Emmys for this role, winning five. She was also the recipient of two Golden Globe Award wins for Best Actress – Television Series Musical or Comedy.

Throughout the 1990s and 2000s, Bergen had guest starred as Murphy Brown on various television programs, though in 2005, she began starring on the spin-off series to The Practice, portraying Shirley Schmidt on Boston Legal from 2005 to 2008. It garnered her critical acclaim, receiving additional Golden Globe and Primetime Emmy Award nominations; as well as five Screen Actors Guild Award nominations for her individual role and for the main cast of Boston Legal.

Bergen is widely known mainly for her television work. Though she has been nominated for one Academy Award, one BAFTA Award, and two additional Golden Globe Award nominations for her work in film.

== Major associations ==
=== Academy Awards ===
Year	Category	Nominated work	Result
1980	Best Supporting Actress	Starting Over	Nominated

=== British Academy Film Awards ===
Year	Category	Nominated work	Result
1983	Best Actress in a Supporting Role	Gandhi	Nominated

=== Golden Globe Awards ===
Year	Category	Nominated work	Result
1967	New Star of the Year – Actress	The Sand Pebbles	Nominated
1980	Best Supporting Actress – Motion Picture	Starting Over	Nominated
1989	Best Actress – Television Series Musical or Comedy	Murphy Brown	Won
1990	Best Actress – Television Series Musical or Comedy	Murphy Brown	Nominated
1991	Best Actress – Television Series Musical or Comedy	Murphy Brown	Nominated
1992	Best Actress – Television Series Musical or Comedy	Murphy Brown	Won
1993	Best Actress – Television Series Musical or Comedy	Murphy Brown	Nominated
1994	Best Actress – Television Series Musical or Comedy	Murphy Brown	Nominated
1995	Best Actress – Television Series Musical or Comedy	Murphy Brown	Nominated
1996	Best Actress – Television Series Musical or Comedy	Murphy Brown	Nominated
2006	Best Supporting Actress – Television	Boston Legal	Nominated
2019	Best Actress – Television Series Musical or Comedy	Murphy Brown	Nominated

=== Primetime Emmy Awards ===
Year	Category	Nominated work	Result
1989	Outstanding Lead Actress in a Comedy Series	Murphy Brown	Won
1990	Outstanding Lead Actress in a Comedy Series	Murphy Brown	Won
1991	Outstanding Lead Actress in a Comedy Series	Murphy Brown	Nominated
1992	Outstanding Lead Actress in a Comedy Series	Murphy Brown	Won
1993	Outstanding Lead Actress in a Comedy Series	Murphy Brown	Nominated
1994	Outstanding Lead Actress in a Comedy Series	Murphy Brown	Won
1995	Outstanding Lead Actress in a Comedy Series	Murphy Brown	Won
2006	Outstanding Supporting Actress in a Drama Series	Boston Legal	Nominated
2008	Outstanding Supporting Actress in a Drama Series	Boston Legal	Nominated

=== Screen Actors Guild Awards ===
Year	Category	Nominated work	Result
1995	Outstanding Ensemble in a Comedy Series	Murphy Brown	Nominated
1995	Outstanding Female Actor in a Comedy Series	Murphy Brown	Nominated
1996	Outstanding Female Actor in a Comedy Series	Murphy Brown	Nominated
2006	Outstanding Female Actor in a Comedy Series	Boston Legal	Nominated
2006	Outstanding Ensemble in a Comedy Series	Boston Legal	Nominated
2007	Outstanding Ensemble in a Drama Series	Boston Legal	Nominated
2008	Outstanding Ensemble in a Drama Series	Boston Legal	Nominated
2009	Outstanding Ensemble in a Drama Series	Boston Legal	Nominated

== Miscellaneous awards ==
=== Blockbuster Entertainment Awards ===
Year	Category	Result	Nominated work
2001	Funniest Supporting Actress – Comedy	Miss Congeniality	Nominated

=== Golden Raspberry Awards ===
Year	Nominated work	Category	Result
2010	Worst Supporting Actress	Bride Wars	Nominated

=== Teen Choice Awards ===
Year	Nominated work	Category	Result
2003	Choice Movie Villain	Sweet Home Alabama	Nominated

== Television awards ==
=== American Comedy Awards ===
Year	Category	Nominated work	Result
1989	Funniest Female Performer in a TV Series	Murphy Brown	Nominated
1990	Funniest Female Performer in a TV Series	Murphy Brown	Nominated
1991	Funniest Female Performer in a TV Series	Murphy Brown	Nominated
1992	Funniest Female Performer in a TV Series	Murphy Brown	Won
1996	Funniest Female Performer in a TV Series	Murphy Brown	Nominated

=== People's Choice Awards ===
Year	Category	Nominated work	Result
1989	Favorite Female TV Performer	Murphy Brown	Nominated
1990	Favorite Female TV Performer	Murphy Brown	Nominated
1992	Favorite Female TV Performer	Murphy Brown	Won
1993	Favorite Female TV Performer	Murphy Brown	Won
1994	Favorite Female TV Performer	Murphy Brown	Nominated
1995	Favorite Female TV Performer	Murphy Brown	Nominated
1996	Favorite Female TV Performer	Murphy Brown	Nominated

=== Satellite Awards ===
Year	Category	Nominated work	Result
2005	Best Actress – Television Series Musical or Comedy	Boston Legal	Nominated

=== Viewers for Quality Television Awards ===
Year	Category	Nominated work	Result
1989	Best Actress in a Quality Comedy Series	Murphy Brown	Won
1990	Best Actress in a Quality Comedy Series	Murphy Brown	Won
1991	Best Actress in a Quality Comedy Series	Murphy Brown	Won
1992	Best Actress in a Quality Comedy Series	Murphy Brown	Nominated
1993	Best Actress in a Quality Comedy Series	Murphy Brown	Nominated
1994	Best Actress in a Quality Comedy Series	Murphy Brown	Nominated
1995	Best Actress in a Quality Comedy Series	Murphy Brown	Nominated
1996	Best Actress in a Quality Comedy Series	Murphy Brown	Nominated

== Critic awards ==
=== Television Critics Association Awards ===
Year	Category	Nominated work	Result
1998	Career Achievement Award	Herself	Nominated

== Festival awards ==
=== Monte-Carlo Television Festival ===
Year	Category	Nominated work	Result
2009	Outstanding Actress – Drama Series	Boston Legal	Nominated
