= Marshall Rose (real estate developer) =

American real estate developer (1937–2025)

Marshall Rose (January 2, 1937 – February 15, 2025) was an American real estate developer and philanthropist who was the founder of the Georgetown Company, which oversaw the renovation of Madison Square Garden and the construction of the IAC Building.

His first wife, Jill, died in 1996. They had two children, Wendi and Andrew.

In June 2000, he married actress Candice Bergen. They remained married until his death in 2025. Rose died from complications from Parkinson's disease on February 15, 2025, at the age of 88.

== Early life and education ==
Rose was born on January 2, 1937, in the Brighton Beach neighborhood of Brooklyn in New York City. He studied economics at City College of New York, where he earned a bachelor's degree. He later obtained a law degree from New York University School of Law.
