= Candice Bergen =

American actress (born 1946)

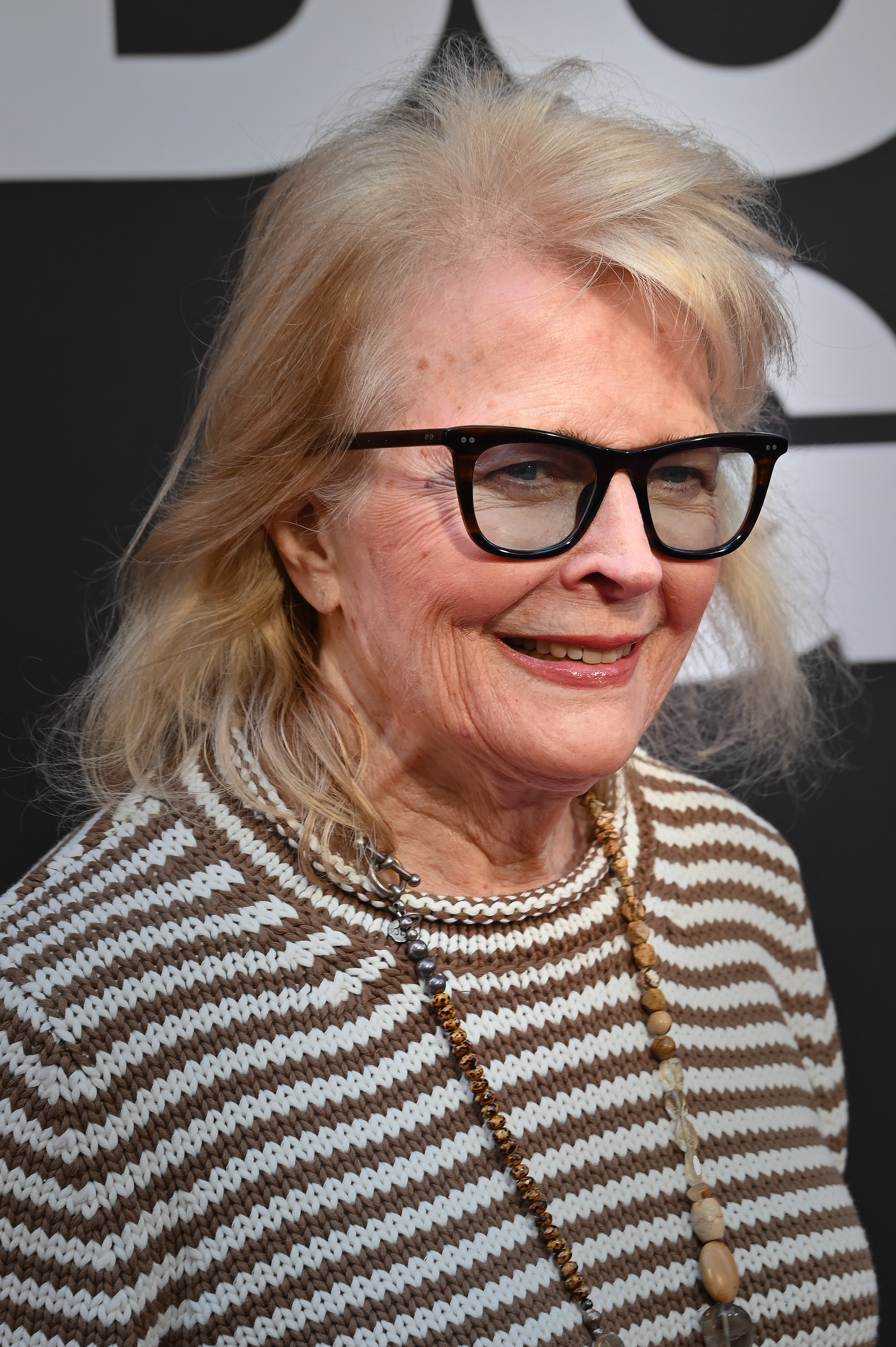
- Bergen in 2025
- Born: Candice Patricia Bergen; May 9, 1946 (age 80); Los Angeles, California, U.S.
- Occupation: Actress
- Years active: 1958–present
- Spouses: Louis Malle (m. 1980; died 1995) Marshall Rose (m. 2000; died 2025)
- Children: Chloe Malle
- Parents: Edgar Bergen; Frances Bergen
- Awards: Full list

Candice Patricia Bergen (born May 9, 1946) is an American actress. She won five Primetime Emmy Awards and two Golden Globe Awards as the title character on the CBS sitcom Murphy Brown (1988–1998, 2018). She is also known for her role as Shirley Schmidt on the ABC drama Boston Legal (2005–2008). In films, Bergen was nominated for the Academy Award for Best Supporting Actress for Starting Over (1979) and for the BAFTA Award for Best Actress in a Supporting Role for Gandhi (1982).

Bergen began her career as a fashion model and appeared on the cover of Vogue before she made her screen debut in the film The Group (1966). She starred in The Sand Pebbles (1966), Soldier Blue (1970), Carnal Knowledge (1971), and The Wind and the Lion (1975). She made her Broadway debut in the 1984 play Hurlyburly and starred in the revivals of The Best Man (2012) and Love Letters (2014). From 2002 to 2004, she appeared in three episodes of the HBO series Sex and the City. Her other film roles include Miss Congeniality (2000), Sweet Home Alabama (2002), The Women (2008), Bride Wars (2009), Book Club (2018) and Let Them All Talk (2020).

== Early life ==
Candice Patricia Bergen was born May 9, 1946, at Hollywood Presbyterian Hospital in Los Angeles, California. Her mother, Frances Bergen (née Westerman), was a Powers model known professionally as Frances Westcott. Her father, Edgar Bergen, was a ventriloquist, comedian, and actor. Bergen's paternal grandparents were Swedish immigrants who anglicized their surname, which was originally Berggren ("mountain branch").

Bergen was raised in Beverly Hills, California, and attended the Westlake School for Girls. As a child, she was irritated when described as "Charlie McCarthy's little sister" (a reference to her father's star dummy). She began appearing on her father's radio program at a young age and in 1958, at age 11, was a guest with her father on Groucho Marx's quiz show You Bet Your Life, as Candy Bergen. She said she wanted to be a clothing designer when she grew up.

She attended the University of Pennsylvania, where she was elected Homecoming Queen and Miss University in 1963. Bergen later said that she did not take her education seriously and, after failing courses in opera and art, was asked to leave at the end of her sophomore year in 1965. She later recounted that while she was a student there she went on a blind date with future president Donald Trump, who was a student at Fordham University at the time,, but she was back home at 9 PM and the date "was really a dud." She received an honorary doctorate from the university in May 1992.

Before taking up acting, Bergen was a fashion model and was featured on Vogue covers. She received acting training at HB Studio in New York City.

== Career ==
=== Early work ===
Bergen made her screen debut playing a university student in the ensemble film The Group (1966), directed by Sidney Lumet, who knew Bergen's family. The film delicately touched on the subject of lesbianism and was a critical and financial success. Afterwards, Bergen left college to focus on her career. She played the role of Shirley Eckert, an assistant school teacher, in The Sand Pebbles (1966) with Steve McQueen. The movie, made for 20th Century Fox, was nominated for several Academy Awards and was a financial success.

She guest-starred on an episode of Coronet Blue, whose director Sam Wanamaker recommended her for the comedy The Day the Fish Came Out (1967), which was directed by Michael Cacoyannis and distributed by Fox. The film was a box-office flop; nevertheless, Fox signed her to a long-term contract.

=== Films ===
Bergen was announced for the role of Anne in Valley of the Dolls, but did not appear in the film.

Bergen went to France to appear in Claude Lelouch's romantic drama Live for Life (1967) opposite Yves Montand, popular in France but not the US.

In 1968, she played the leading female role in The Magus, a British mystery film for Fox starring Michael Caine and Anthony Quinn that was almost universally ridiculed and was another major flop.

She played a frustrated socialite in a 1970 political satire, The Adventurers, based on a novel by Harold Robbins. Her salary was $200,000. The film received negative reviews, and while it did respectably at the box office, it did not help her career. Bergen called it a "movie out of the 1940s."

Bergen played Elliott Gould's girlfriend in Getting Straight (1970), a counterculture movie which drew another spate of bad reviews but was commercially profitable. She said it took her career in "a new direction... my first experience with democratic, communal movie making."

She also starred in the controversial Western Soldier Blue (1970), an overseas success but a failure in America. The film's European success led to Bergen's being voted by British exhibitors as the seventh-most popular star at the British box office in 1971. Bergen appeared with Oliver Reed and Gene Hackman in The Hunting Party (1971), a violent Western which drew terrible reviews and flopped.

Bergen received some strong reviews for her supporting role in Carnal Knowledge (1971), directed by Mike Nichols. She then had the lead role in the drama T.R. Baskin (1971) and earned the best reviews of her career up to that time. She described the latter as the first role "that is really sort of a vehicle, where I have to act and not just be a sort of decoration" saying she had decided "it was time for me to get serious about acting."

Bergen was absent from screens for a few years. She returned with a supporting part in a British heist film, 11 Harrowhouse (1974), then did a Western with Gene Hackman and James Coburn, Bite the Bullet (1975). Both films were modest successes. In 1975, she replaced Faye Dunaway at the last minute to co-star with Sean Connery in The Wind and the Lion (1976), as a strong-willed American widow kidnapped in the Moroccan desert. The film drew mixed reviews and broke even at the box office.

Bergen was reunited with Hackman in The Domino Principle (1977) for Stanley Kramer, another failure.

She appeared in A Night Full of Rain (1978) for Lina Wertmüller and was the love interest of Ryan O'Neal's character in the Love Story sequel, Oliver's Story (1978), but both films failed critically and financially.

Bergen appeared with Burt Reynolds in the romantic comedy Starting Over (1979), for which she received Academy Award and Golden Globe Award nominations for best supporting actress.

She portrayed a best-selling author in Rich and Famous (1981) with Jacqueline Bisset. A remake of the Bette Davis film Old Acquaintance; the film was not a success.

In 1982, Bergen appeared in the Oscar-winning film Gandhi in which she portrayed documentary photographer Margaret Bourke-White. Bergen was nominated for a BAFTA Award for Best Actress in a Supporting Role.

=== Television and other work ===
Beginning in the 1970s, Bergen became a frequent guest host of Saturday Night Live. She was the first woman to host the show, and the first host to do a second show. She was also the first woman to join the Five-Timers Club when she hosted for the fifth time in 1990. In recent years, Bergen has made various cameos on SNL, often to help welcome new members into the Five-Timers Club, such as Jonah Hill in 2018, John Mulaney in 2022, Emma Stone in 2023, and Jack Black in 2026. Bergen also guest-starred on The Muppet Show in its first season, while her father Edgar would guest-star the following season.

In 1984, Bergen joined the Broadway cast of Hurlyburly.

On television, Bergen appeared as Morgan Le Fay in Merlin and the Sword (1985) and in the miniseries Hollywood Wives (1985). She was Burt Reynolds' romantic interest in Stick (1985), and for TV appeared in Murder: By Reason of Insanity (1985) and Mayflower Madam (1987).

She portrayed an editor of Vogue on Sex and the City. Her daughter, Chloe Malle, joined the magazine in 2011 and became the head of editorial in 2024. Malle was named editor-in-chief of Vogue magazine by Anna Wintour on September 1, 2025, replacing Wintour who has been in the role since 1988.

=== Murphy Brown ===
In 1988, she took the lead role in the sitcom Murphy Brown, in which she played a tough television reporter. This provided her with the opportunity to show her little-seen comic talent. The series made frequent reference to politicians and political issues of the day; though it was primarily a conventional sitcom, the show tackled important issues. For example, Brown was a recovering alcoholic who became a single mother and later battled breast cancer.

In 1992, Vice President Dan Quayle criticized prime-time TV for showing the Murphy Brown character "mocking the importance of fathers by bearing a child alone and calling it just another lifestyle choice." Quayle's disparaging remarks were subsequently written into the show, with Brown shown watching Quayle's speech in disbelief at his insensitivity and ignorance of the reality of the lives of single mothers. A subsequent episode explored the subject of family values within a diverse set of families. The Brown character arranges for a truckload of potatoes to be dumped in front of Quayle's residence, an allusion to an infamous incident in which Quayle erroneously directed a school child to spell the word "potato" as "potatoe".

In reality, Bergen agreed with at least some of Quayle's observations, saying that while the particular remark was "an arrogant and uninformed posture", as a whole, it was "a perfectly intelligent speech about fathers not being dispensable and nobody agreed with that more than I did."

Bergen's run on Murphy Brown was extremely successful. The show ran for ten seasons; between 1989 and 1998, Bergen was nominated for an Emmy Award seven times and won five. After her fifth win, she declined future nominations for the role.

=== Post-Murphy Brown ===
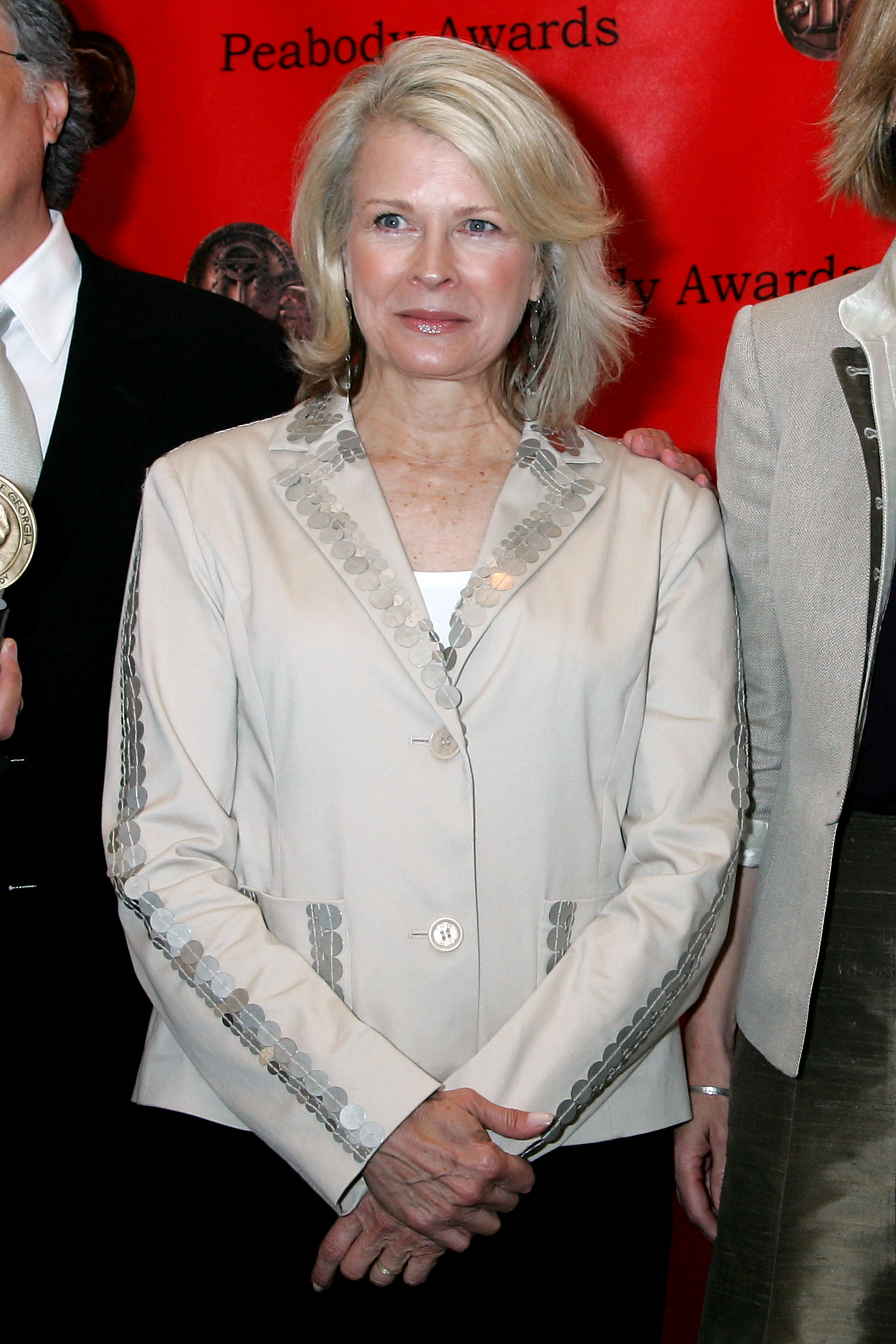
Bergen at the 65th Annual Peabody Awards in New York City, 2006

After playing the role of Murphy Brown, Bergen was offered a chance to work as a real-life journalist. After the show ended in 1998, CBS approached her to cover stories for 60 Minutes. She declined, saying she did not want to blur the lines between actor and journalist.

Subsequently, Bergen hosted Exhale with Candice Bergen on the Oxygen network. From 1991 to 1998, Bergen appeared as the main spokesperson for the Sprint long-distance phone company.

Bergen produced and starred in the TV movie Mary & Tim (1996). She also appeared in films including Miss Congeniality (2000), where she played veteran pageant host Kathy Morningside; portrayed the mayor of New York in Sweet Home Alabama (2002); and appeared in the Gwyneth Paltrow flight-attendant comedy, View from the Top (2003).

She had roles in the remake of The In-Laws (2003), Footsteps (2003), a thriller, and appeared in three episodes of Sex and the City and one episode in the sequel series And Just Like That... as Enid Frick, Carrie Bradshaw's editor at Vogue. Bergen also appeared as Frick in a cameo for the 2008 movie version of Sex and the City.

=== Boston Legal and beyond ===
In January 2005, Bergen joined the cast of the television series Boston Legal as Shirley Schmidt, a founding partner in the law firm of Crane, Poole & Schmidt. The series reunited her with her Miss Congeniality co-star William Shatner. She played the role for five seasons. In 2006 and 2008, she received Emmy nominations for Outstanding Supporting Actress in a Drama Series.

She has also made guest appearances on many other TV shows, including Seinfeld (as herself playing Murphy Brown), Law & Order, Family Guy, and Will & Grace (playing herself). She has also featured in a long-running "Dime Lady" ad campaign for the Sprint phone company.

Bergen could be seen in The Women (2008) and Bride Wars (2009) as Marion St. Claire, New York's most sought-after wedding planner, who also serves as the narrator of the story.

From its launch in 2008, Bergen was a contributor for wowOwow.com, a website for women to talk culture, politics and gossip. The website closed in 2010.

She was in The Romantics (2010) and had an occasional role on House as Lisa Cuddy's mother, starting in Season 7, including the episodes "Larger Than Life" and "Family Practice".

In 2010, she appeared in a one-night only concert: a semi-staged reading of Evening Primrose by Stephen Sondheim. She also appeared on Broadway in the 2012 revival of Gore Vidal's The Best Man and the 2014 revival of Love Letters.

Later performances included A Merry Friggin' Christmas (2014), Beautiful & Twisted (2015), Rules Don't Apply (2016),The Meyerowitz Stories (New and Selected) (2017), Home Again (2017) and Book Club (2018).

=== Murphy Brown reboot ===
On January 24, 2018, it was announced that Bergen would be reprising her role as Murphy Brown. The reboot aired on CBS in fall 2018 for 13 episodes. On May 10, 2019, the reboot was canceled by CBS.

== Beyond acting ==
In addition to acting, Bergen studied photography and worked as a photojournalist. She has written numerous articles and a play, as well as two memoirs, Knock Wood in 1984, and A Fine Romance in 2015.

In 2000, Bergen became the host of her own talk show called Exhale on Oxygen. Guests included Anne Bancroft and Diane Keaton. It ran for one season and was produced by Scott Carter, future producer of Politically Incorrect with Bill Maher.

In 2016, Bergen began painting, with paint pens, on handbags, with the business overseen by her daughter, Chloé Malle, and with the proceeds benefiting charity.

Bergen speaks Yiddish.

== Personal life ==
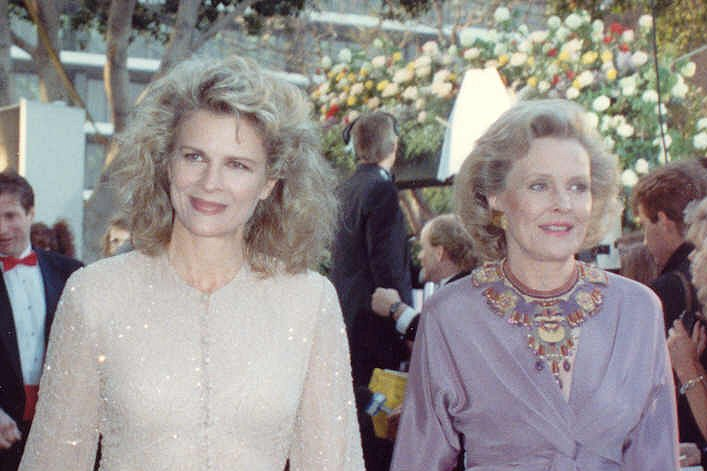
Candice Bergen and her mother, Frances Bergen, at the 62nd Academy Awards

Bergen is a political activist who once accepted a date with Henry Kissinger. In 1967, she participated in a Yippie prank when she, Abbie Hoffman, and others threw dollar bills onto the floor of the New York Stock Exchange, leading to its temporary shutdown. In the late 1960s, Bergen was in a relationship with Doris Day's son Terry Melcher. In 1972, she served as a fundraiser and organizer for George McGovern's presidential campaign.

Bergen's father died in 1978. In her memoir A Fine Romance, she mentions that she was left out of his will, while he bequeathed $10,000 to his dummy, Charlie McCarthy, adding that she felt her father had a stronger bond with Charlie than with her. She later said:

His death left a space for me [...] I was able much more to live according to my own expectations. I always felt my fame was ill-gotten, sort of borrowed from his, and that perhaps I tried to keep some kind of rein on it. Even when he was in retirement I felt I was poaching on his territory. He'd joke and say he was 'the father of Candice Bergen,' and that was only partially a joke. It was very hard on him.

On September 27, 1980, she married French film director Louis Malle. They had one child, a daughter named Chloe Françoise, in 1985. The couple were married until Malle's death from cancer on Thanksgiving Day in 1995.

In 2000 she married New York real estate magnate and philanthropist Marshall Rose. They remained married until his death from Parkinson's disease on February 15, 2025.

== Filmography ==
=== Film ===
Year	Title	Role	Notes
1966	The Group	'Lakey' Eastlake	
1966	The Sand Pebbles	Shirley Eckert	
1967	The Day the Fish Came Out	Electra Brown	
1967	Live for Life	Candice	
1968	The Magus	Lily	
1970	The Adventurers	Sue Ann Daley	
1970	Getting Straight	Jan	
1970	Soldier Blue	Cresta Maribel Lee	
1971	Carnal Knowledge	Susan	
1971	The Hunting Party	Melissa Ruger	
1971	T.R. Baskin	T.R. Baskin	
1974	11 Harrowhouse	Maren Shirell	
1975	The Wind and the Lion	Eden Pedecaris	
1975	Bite the Bullet	Miss Jones	
1977	The Domino Principle	Ellie Tucker	
1978	A Night Full of Rain	Lizzy	
1978	Oliver's Story	Marcie Bonwit	
1979	Starting Over	Jessica Potter	
1981	Rich and Famous	Merry Noel Blake	
1982	Gandhi	Margaret Bourke-White	
1984	2010	SAL 9000	Voice only; credited as Olga Mallsnerd; Also known as 2010: The Year We Make Contact
1985	Stick	Kyle McClaren	
2000	Miss Congeniality	Kathy Morningside	
2002	Sweet Home Alabama	Mayor Kate Hennings	
2003	View from the Top	Sally Weston	
2003	The In-Laws	Judy Tobias	
2008	Sex and the City	Enid Frick	
2008	The Women	Catherine Frazier	
2009	Bride Wars	Marion St. Claire	Also narrator
2010	The Romantics	Augusta Hayes	
2014	A Merry Friggin' Christmas	Donna Mitchler	
2016	Rules Don't Apply	Nadine Henly	
2017	The Meyerowitz Stories	Julia	
2017	Home Again	Lillian Stewart	
2018	Book Club	Sharon Myers	
2020	Let Them All Talk	Roberta	
2022	As They Made Us	Barbara	
2023	Book Club: The Next Chapter	Sharon Myers	

=== Television ===
Year	Title	Role	Notes
1967	Coronet Blue	Enid Toler	Episode: "The Rebels"
1969	The Woody Allen Special	Various Roles	Television special
1975–2026	Saturday Night Live	Herself	10 episodes
1976	The Muppet Show	Herself	Episode: "Candice Bergen"
1985	Hollywood Wives	Elaine Conti	Television mini series
1985	Merlin and the Sword	Morgan le Fay	Television film
1985	Murder: By Reason of Insanity	Ewa Berwid	Television film
1987	Trying Times	Barbara	Episode: "Moving Day"
1987	Mayflower Madam	Sydney Biddle Barrows	Television film
1988–1998; 2018	Murphy Brown	Murphy Brown	260 episodes; also executive producer
1992	Seinfeld	herself as Murphy Brown	Episode: "The Keys"
1994–1995	Understanding	Narrator	4 episodes
1996	Mary & Tim	Mary Horton	Television film
1997	Ink	Murphy Brown	Episode: "Murphy's Law"
2000	Family Guy	Gloria Ironbachs/Murphy Brown	Episodes: "I Am Peter, Hear Me Roar"/"A Picture's Worth a Thousand Bucks"
2002–2004	Sex and the City	Enid Frick	3 episodes
2003	Footsteps	Daisy Lowendahl	TV film
2004	Law & Order	Judge Amanda Anderlee	Episode: "The Brotherhood"
2004	Will & Grace	Herself	Episode: "Strangers with Candice"
2005	Law & Order: Trial by Jury	Judge Amanda Anderlee	3 episodes
2005–2008	Boston Legal	Shirley Schmidt	84 episodes
2011	House	Arlene Cuddy	3 episodes
2013	The Michael J. Fox Show	Beth Henry	Episode: "Thanksgiving"
2015	Beautiful & Twisted	Bernice Novack	TV film; Also known as The Novack Murders
2015	Battle Creek	Constance	Episode: "Mama's Boy"
2016	BoJack Horseman	The Closer (voice)	Episode: "Stop the Presses"
2021	The Conners	Barb	3 episodes
2023	And Just Like That...	Enid Frick	Episode: "Alive!"
2026	Shrinking	Constance	1 episode
