= The Woody Allen Special =

1969 US television special

- Genre: Stand-up comedy Variety special
- Written by: Woody Allen
- Directed by: Alan Handley
- Starring: Woody Allen; Candice Bergen; The 5th Dimension; Rev. Billy Graham
- Music by: Marvin Hamlish; Elliot Lawrence
- Country of origin: United States
- Original language: English

Production
- Executive producers: Charles H. Joffe; Jack Rollins
- Producer: Alan Handley
- Running time: 60 minutes

Original release
- Network: CBS
- Release: September 21, 1969

The Woody Allen Special is a television special that premiered on CBS on September 21, 1969, starring stand-up comedian Woody Allen. Allen hosted and wrote the television special show in which he opens with a standup monologue and acts in a series of comedy skits alongside actress Candice Bergen. He also has a conversation with guest and southern Baptist preacher The Reverend Billy Graham as they talk about religion, faith, and each other. The musical group The 5th Dimension serves as the musical guest.

== Cast ==
- Woody Allen as host
- Candice Bergen as various roles
- The 5th Dimension as musical guest
- Billy Graham as special guest
- Barney Martin
- Tony Randall

== Summary ==
The special opens with a standup monologue routine given by Allen where he talks about growing up in Brooklyn, his relatives, sex, death, and his recent Broadway work with Play It Again, Sam.

Following features three sketches starring Allen and Bergen:

- Play rehearsal sketch
- "Cupid's Shaft"
- "An Original Folk Tale"

Allen shows a short film he directed in form of a silent movie, similar to that of Charlie Chaplin or Harold Lloyd.

The 5th Dimension plays a medley of their hits "Workin' On A Groovy Thing" and "Wedding Bell Blues”.

Following that Allen has a respectful yet comedic conversation with guest Billy Graham.

== Production ==
In 1969, Allen was fresh off his Broadway play Play it Again, Sam and his directorial debut film Take the Money and Run and was able to write and star in this special for CBS.

== Reception ==
In NPR critic David Bianculli's review of Woody Allen: A Documentary, he wrote that he wished it had covered Allen's TV work including "the brilliant 1969 special".

Ramsey Ess wrote a piece on the special in Vulture describing it as "A very strange combination of elements" and that "The Woody Allen Special was a variety show in every sense of the word.". Ess criticized some of the sketches writing that they "overstay their welcome, and the nude actor sketch doesn’t really have an ending, but when Woody lands a solid joke, there’s no stopping him. Luckily there are enough of those to make it worth your while." He did however praise the standup material and the conversation with Billy Graham writing, "It’s one of the strangest pairings in all of television and it makes for some really compelling watching."
