= Kurt Vonnegut: Unstuck in Time =

American documentary

- Poster
- Directed by: Robert B. Weide; Don Argott
- Written by: Robert B. Weide
- Produced by: Robert B. Weide
- Starring: Kurt Vonnegut; Robert B. Weide
- Edited by: William Neal; Bo Price; Demian Fenton
- Music by: Alex Mansour
- Production companies: 9.14 Pictures; Whyaduck Productions
- Distributed by: IFC Films
- Release date: November 11, 2021 (DOC NYC)
- Country: United States
- Language: English

Kurt Vonnegut: Unstuck in Time is a 2021 American documentary film, directed by Robert B. Weide.

== Synopsis ==
The film tells the story of Kurt Vonnegut's life and work. At the same time, it explores the process of making this film, which started 40 years earlier.

== Cast ==
The cast includes Jerome Klinkowitz, Sidney Offit, Morley Safer, Daniel Simon, and David L. Ulin.

== Release and reception ==
The film premiered at the 2021 DOC NYC film festival. In a review in The Hollywood Reporter, Angie Han wrote, "does, in the end, feel like a true act of friendship. If that isn’t nice, what is?" IndieWire's review, commented that the film "is at its best during the occasional stretches in which it candidly unpacks its own creation."
