= Robert B. Weide =

Screenwriter, producer, director, documentarian

- Born: June 20, 1959 (age 67)
- Occupations: Documentarian, producer, director, screenwriter
- Spouse: Linda Bates Weide (died 2022)
- Writing career
- Notable works: Curb Your Enthusiasm; The Marx Brothers in a Nutshell; Woody Allen: A Documentary; Lenny Bruce: Swear to Tell the Truth
- Notable awards: 3 Primetime Emmy Awards (1986, 1999, 2003)
- Website: www.duckprods.com

Robert B. Weide (born June 20, 1959) is an American screenwriter and television producer. He was director and executive producer of the sitcom Curb Your Enthusiasm from 1999 to 2004. He has also directed several documentaries, including four about comedians: W. C. Fields: Straight Up (1986), Mort Sahl: The Loyal Opposition (1989), Lenny Bruce: Swear to Tell the Truth (1998) and Woody Allen: A Documentary (2011). His latest, Kurt Vonnegut: Unstuck in Time (2021), explores the life and works of Kurt Vonnegut.

Weide received an Academy Award nomination for Lenny Bruce: Swear to Tell the Truth (1999). He also received Emmy Awards for W. C. Fields: Head Up (1986), and Curb Your Enthusiasm.

== Early work and education ==
Weide began working with film at an early job inspecting 16-millimeter educational films at the Fullerton Public Library in Orange County, California.

In 1978, while taking film production courses at Orange Coast College in Costa Mesa, California, Weide decided to produce a documentary film on the Marx Brothers, inspired by his love of their work. Undeterred by repeated rejections of his applications to the USC School of Cinema-Television, he worked on the project on his own time and with help from Charles H. Joffe got the rights to clips necessary to make the film. The Marx Brothers in a Nutshell was broadcast in 1982 on PBS and became "one of the highest-rated programs in PBS history".

== Career ==
=== W. C. Fields: Straight Up (1986) ===
Weide co-wrote W. C. Fields: Straight Up (1986) with Joseph Adamson and Ronald J. Fields. Adamson directed it, and Dudley Moore narrated. In an interview with The Los Angeles Times, Weide said: "The film was 94 minutes long. We had access to all of his feature films, and clips from 1915 on. We have newsreel footage, outtakes, and material never seen before. We also have interviews with people who knew and/or worked with Fields, or have special knowledge of him, including Joseph L. Mankiewicz, Will Fowler, Madge Kennedy, who played in the 1923 stage production of 'Poppy' and co-starred in the movie, Leonard Maltin, Ronald J. Fields, propman Harry Caplan and an audio interview with the grown-up Baby Leroy."

=== Mort Sahl: The Loyal Opposition (1989) ===
Weide's next project concerned the career of Mort Sahl. The project was part of the American Masters documentary series, which originally ran on PBS in 1989.

=== Lenny Bruce: Swear to Tell the Truth (1998) ===
In 1998, Weide directed the documentary Swear to Tell the Truth, which received a nomination for the Academy Award for Best Documentary. Robert De Niro narrated it, and it featured interviews with Bruce's ex-wife Honey, mother Sally Marr and former TV host Steve Allen, who had Bruce on his show a few times. The film debuted on HBO.

=== Curb Your Enthusiasm ===
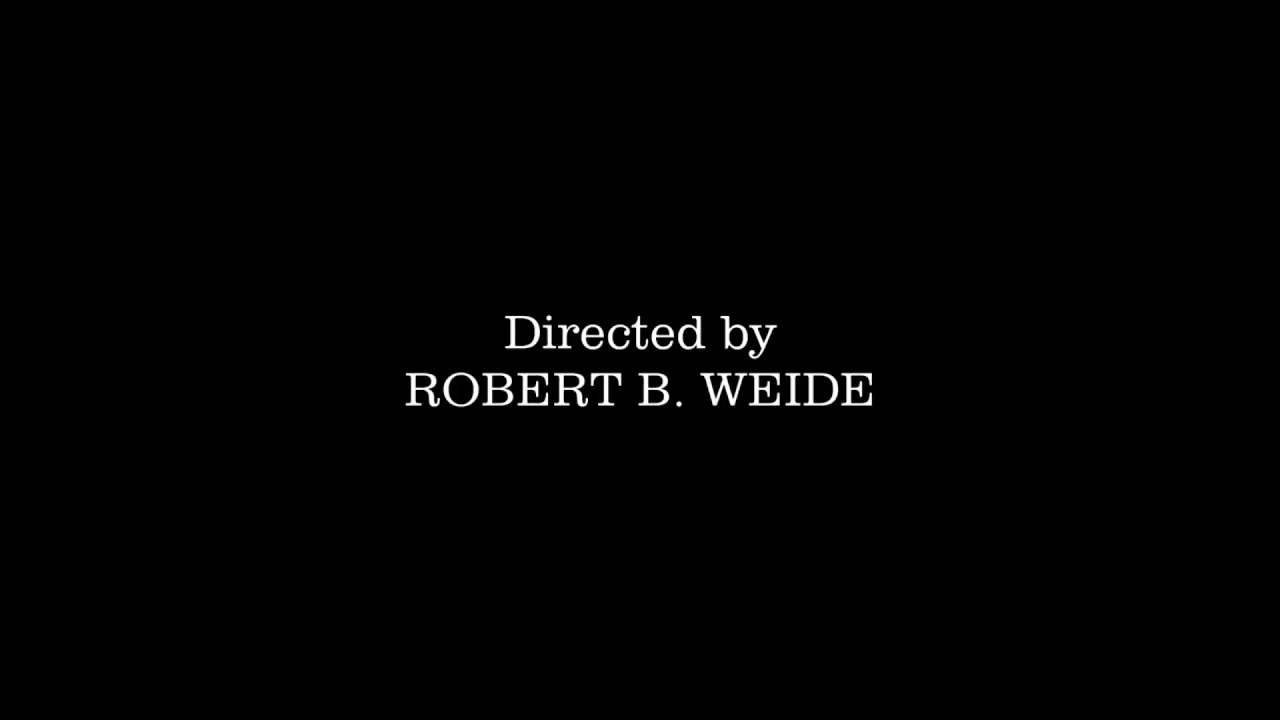
The exact screenshot which became a meme.

From 2000 to 2005, Weide served as principal director and an executive producer of Larry David's HBO comedy series Curb Your Enthusiasm. He became involved in the series after receiving a script by David titled "Prognosis Negative". In 1998 David told Weide that HBO was interested in doing a comedy special about David's return to stand-up—"ostensibly a documentary with some behind-the-scenes footage. And he told me he wanted me to direct it." The special turned out to be the beginning of the series. Since then David and Weide have often collaborated, with Weide serving as a director and executive producer. Weide returned with the show in 2007, directing "The Anonymous Donor", and continued to guest direct until the show ended.

Weide received several Primetime Emmy Award nominations for his work on the show, eventually winning for Outstanding Directing for a Comedy Series in 2003 during its third season. His ending credit on the show has become part of an internet meme.

=== How to Lose Friends & Alienate People ===
Weide's first feature film as director, How to Lose Friends & Alienate People, was released in 2008 to generally unfavorable reviews, though it topped the United Kingdom's box office during its opening weekend.

=== Woody Allen: A Documentary (2011) ===
Weide's next documentary, Woody Allen: A Documentary, explored the career of filmmaker and comedian Woody Allen as part of PBS's American Masters series. The film looks at Allen's nearly seven-decade career as a director and comedian. It features interviews with Allen, Diane Keaton, Scarlett Johansson, Martin Scorsese, Chris Rock, Owen Wilson, Larry David, Penelope Cruz, and Leonard Maltin. It received favorable reviews and has a 90% rating on Rotten Tomatoes based on 21 reviews. The website's critical consensus states: "Driving aside the most polemical aspects of the director's biography, Woody Allen: A Documentary draws an interesting picture of the filmmaker's opus while allowing some glimpses of his intense personal life." The New Yorker critic Richard Brody wrote: "It's a close look at how Allen's career was shaped, from his Brooklyn youth to his precocious launch as a comedy writer, his rise to local fame as a standup comedian and to national celebrity on television, his move from screenwriter to director of the 'early, funny' films to internationally lionized auteur to pariah and, gradually, back again."

Weide was the director and main writer for Mr. Sloane, a 2014 British comedy series.

== Work with Kurt Vonnegut ==
I have some kind of knack for getting to know or becoming very close with people I've long admired. Kurt Vonnegut and I—it's not an exaggeration to say we were best friends. And I grew up just idolizing him."

— Weide in October 2008

Weide wrote and produced the 1996 film adaptation of Kurt Vonnegut's Mother Night. With Vonnegut's support, Weide chronicled him on film starting in 1988 and has obtained footage of him from 16 mm home movies dating back to 1925. Weide was also working on a film adaptation of The Sirens of Titan until the film rights were sold to another producer.

Writing under the pseudonym Wyaduck (a Marx Brothers reference), Weide was a frequent poster to Usenet group alt.books.kurt-vonnegut, where he reported on the progress of the Mother Night project. He was mentioned in Vonnegut's Timequake.

In 2001, Weide directed a revival of Vonnegut's play Happy Birthday, Wanda June starring his wife, Linda Bates, as Penelope.

== Filmography ==
=== Film ===
Documentary film

Year	Title	Director	Writer
1998	Lenny Bruce: Swear to Tell the Truth	Yes	Yes
2021	Kurt Vonnegut: Unstuck in Time	Yes	Yes

Feature film

Year	Title	Director	Writer
1996	Mother Night	No	Yes
2008	How to Lose Friends and Alienate People	Yes	No

=== Television ===
Documentary film

Year	Title	Director	Writer
1982	Marx Brothers in a Nutshell	No	Yes
1984	The Great Standups	Yes	Yes
1986	W. C. Fields: Straight Up	No	Yes

Documentary special

Year	Title	Director	Writer	Notes
1989	Mort Sahl: The Loyal Opposition	Yes	Yes	Segments of American Masters
2011	Woody Allen: A Documentary	Yes	Yes	Segments of American Masters

TV series

Year	Title	Director	Writer	Notes
1999	Larry David: Curb Your Enthusiasm	Yes	No	Pilot
2000–2024	Curb Your Enthusiasm	Yes	No	30 episodes
2012	Parks and Recreation	Yes	No	Episode "Dave Returns"
2014	Mr. Sloane	Yes	Yes	6 episodes
2014	Marry Me	Yes	No	Episode "Annicurser-Me"
2016	Graves	Yes	No	2 episodes

TV special

Year	Title	Director	Writer	Notes
1987	Billy Crystal: Don't Get Me Started	No	Yes	
2005	Earth to America	Yes	No	Opening segment

== Awards and nominations ==
Year	Award	Category	Nominated work	Result
1998	Academy Award	Best Documentary	Lenny Bruce: Swear to Tell the Truth	Nominated
1986	Primetime Emmy Awards	Nonfiction Series or Special	W. C. Fields: Straight Up	Won
1999	Primetime Emmy Awards	Outstanding Documentary	Lenny Bruce: Swear to Tell the Truth	Nominated
1999	Primetime Emmy Awards	Editing for a Nonfiction Program	Lenny Bruce: Swear to Tell the Truth	Won
2002	Primetime Emmy Awards	Comedy Series	Curb Your Enthusiasm	Nominated
2002	Primetime Emmy Awards	Directing for a Comedy Series	Curb Your Enthusiasm – The Doll	Nominated
2003	Primetime Emmy Awards	Comedy Series	Curb Your Enthusiasm	Nominated
2003	Primetime Emmy Awards	Directing for a Comedy Series	Curb Your Enthusiasm – Krazee-Eyez Killa	Won
2004	Primetime Emmy Awards	Comedy Series	Curb Your Enthusiasm	Nominated
2004	Primetime Emmy Awards	Directing for a Comedy Series	Curb Your Enthusiasm – The Car Pool Lane	Nominated
2006	Primetime Emmy Awards	Comedy Series	Curb Your Enthusiasm	Nominated
2006	Primetime Emmy Awards	Directing for a Comedy Series	Curb Your Enthusiasm – The Christ Nail	Nominated
2012	Primetime Emmy Awards	Directing for a Comedy Series	Curb Your Enthusiasm – Palestinian Chicken	Nominated
2012	Primetime Emmy Awards	Outstanding Documentary Series	Woody Allen: A Documentary	Nominated
2012	Primetime Emmy Awards	Directing for a Documentary Program	Woody Allen: A Documentary	Nominated
2004	Directors Guild of America Award	Directing - Comedy Series	Curb Your Enthusiasm – The Car Pool Lane	Nominated
2011	Directors Guild of America Award	Directing - Comedy Series	Curb Your Enthusiasm – Palestinian Chicken	Won
2003	Producers Guild of America Award	Best Episodic Comedy	Curb Your Enthusiasm – The Car Pool Lane	Won
2005	Producers Guild of America Award	Best Episodic Comedy	Curb Your Enthusiasm – Palestinian Chicken	Won
2007	Producers Guild of America Award	Best Episodic Comedy	Curb Your Enthusiasm	Nominated

== Personal life ==
Weide married actress Linda Bates. His marriage to her and her subsequent issues with progressive supranuclear palsy are chronicled in Kurt Vonnegut: Unstuck in Time.
