= The Woody Allen Show =

1965 British stand-up comedy TV show

- Written by: Woody Allen
- Directed by: Philip Casson
- Starring: Woody Allen
- Country of origin: United Kingdom
- Original language: English

Production
- Producer: John Hamp
- Running time: 38 minutes
- Production company: Granada Television

Original release
- Network: ITV
- Release: 10 February 1965

The Woody Allen Show is a British stand-up comedy television show featuring American comedian Woody Allen first screened in the UK on 10 February 1965. The special was made by Granada Television.

== Content and production ==
Allen was in the United Kingdom filming Casino Royale which was released in 1967. During this time, Allen recorded a half-hour show for the ITV contractor Granada Television. According to Leo Benedictus from The Guardian, the special might be the only complete standup special from Allen that exists. Allen's routine includes parts of Allen's comedy albums, including "The Moose".

== Reception ==
The special was rediscovered in 2013 to which several critics commented on the show. Ben Brock of IndieWire was impressed by Allen's performing style describing the "level of energy evident in the way he leaps around the microphone". Leo Benedictus, writing for The Guardian, was complimentary: "Allen's style, though mannered, is always relaxed and conversational, which is why it hasn't dated. Most of the laughs in his stories come from their absurd situations or his skillful wordplay, yet he tells them like a modern comedian complaining about lifts."
