= Woody Allen: A Documentary =

American documentary television miniseries

- Genre: Documentary
- Written by: Robert B. Weide
- Directed by: Robert B. Weide
- Music by: Paul Cantelon
- Country of origin: United States
- Original language: English
- No. of episodes: 2

Production
- Executive producers: Michael Peyser; Brett Ratner; Fisher Stevens; Andrew Karsch; Erik Gordon
- Producer: Robert B. Weide
- Cinematography: Buddy Squires; Bill Sheehy; Anthony Savini; Neve Cunningham; Nancy Schreiber
- Editors: Robert B. Weide; Karoliina Tuovinen
- Running time: 3 hrs 12 min
- Production companies: Insurgent Media; WNET Thirteen; American Masters; B Plus Productions; Eagle Rock Entertainment

Original release
- Network: PBS
- Release: November 19 – November 20, 2011

Woody Allen: A Documentary is a 2011 American documentary television miniseries directed by Robert B. Weide about the comedian and filmmaker Woody Allen. It premiered as part of the American Masters series on PBS. The film covers Allen's career as a standup comedian, sitcom writer, film director, and film auteur. At the 64th Primetime Emmy Awards, the series received two nominations: for Outstanding Documentary Series and for Directing for a Documentary Program.

== Overview ==
The series covers Allen's childhood living with a large Jewish family in the neighborhood of Brooklyn, New York, in the 1930s, to starting his career in Greenwich Village as a standup comedian and working as a comedy writer alongside Mel Brooks, Carl Reiner, Neil Simon, and Larry Gelbart on Sid Caesar's Your Show of Shows. It also discusses Allen's early comedy films, his awards success with Annie Hall (1977), and his prominence as a writer and director, as well as the highs and lows of his professional and personal lives spanning the seven decades leading up to his latest film, Midnight in Paris (2011).

== Cast ==
The many artists, historians, and critics that are interviewed include:

- Diane Keaton
- Dianne Wiest
- Scarlett Johansson
- Penélope Cruz
- Mariel Hemingway
- Mira Sorvino
- Naomi Watts
- Julie Kavner
- Louise Lasser
- Owen Wilson
- Antonio Banderas
- John Cusack
- Josh Brolin
- Sean Penn
- Chris Rock
- Larry David
- Martin Scorsese
- Dick Cavett
- Annette Insdorf
- Leonard Maltin
- Richard Schickel
- Juliet Taylor
- Gordon Willis
- Vilmos Zsigmond

== Episodes ==
No.	Title	Directed by	Original release date	U.S. viewers (millions)
1	"Episode One"	Robert B. Weide	November 19, 2011	N/A
2	"Episode Two"	Robert B. Weide	November 20, 2011	N/A

== Production ==
Susan Lacy, who created the PBS series American Masters and had overseen programs about subjects ranging from Buster Keaton to Jerome Robbins and John Lennon to Bob Dylan, served as an executive producer on the project, telling The Hollywood Reporter: "This is the Woody doc everybody has been waiting for, and I am delighted that this creative giant is finally assuming his rightful place in the American Masters library".

== Reception ==
=== Critical response ===
The two-part documentary series received positive reviews. On review aggregator website Rotten Tomatoes, it holds an approval rating of 91% based on 22 reviews, with an average score of 6.7/10; the site's "critics consensus" states: "Driving aside the most polemical aspects of the director's biography, Woody Allen: A Documentary draws an interesting picture of the filmmaker's opus while allowing some glimpses of his intense personal life."

Tim Goodman of The Hollywood Reporter praised Weide and the series, writing: "Writer and director Robert Weide got unfettered access to one of the country's great and most prolific directors whose private life and personal feelings about his work had never been adequately captured. Credit Weide, who spent a year and a half with Allen, including at home, traveling and on the set of a working film, for not botching such a grand opportunity." Peter Bradshaw of The Guardian wrote: "To see [Allen] scribbling scripts on his yellow legal pads or hammering them out on a typewriter that he has had since a teenager is almost awe-inspiring. There can't be a life story in postwar American cinema more inspiring than his: the comic genius who started out as a gag-writer for the newspapers, then a standup, and then a film-maker who insisted on auteur prerogative without ever needing to use the word, and who became an evangelist for the masters of European cinema." Bradshaw also criticized the series, however, for failing to discuss seriously the "elephant in the room" (meaning the scandal involving Allen's marriage to Soon-Yi Previn), saying: "Soon-Yi is discussed very gingerly, cursorily; there's a montage of the tabloid front pages, and Allen blandly says that people are entitled to whatever opinion they like."

=== Accolades ===
Year	Award	Category	Nominated work	Result	Ref.
2012	Primetime Emmy Awards	Outstanding Documentary Series	Woody Allen: A Documentary	Nominated	
2012	Primetime Emmy Awards	Directing for a Documentary Program	Woody Allen: A Documentary	Nominated	
