= Detroit Catholic Central High School =

Location
- 27225 Wixom Road; Novi, Michigan 48374; United States; 42°29′22″N 83°32′26″W

Information
- Type: Private
- Motto: Teach Me Goodness, Discipline, and Knowledge
- Religious affiliation: Catholic Church (Congregation of St. Basil)
- Patron saints: Mary, Alma Mater (The Blessed Mother)
- Established: 1928
- President: Ed Turek
- Principal: Mitch Hancock
- Chaplain: Fr. Dennis Noelke '71
- Teaching staff: 76.0 (on an FTE basis)
- Grades: 9-12
- Gender: Boys
- Enrollment: 1,072 (2015-16)
- Student to teacher ratio: 14:1
- Colors: Royal Blue and White
- Athletics conference: Catholic High School League
- Nickname: Shamrocks
- Accreditation: North Central Association of Colleges and Schools
- Newspaper: The Spectrum
- Yearbook: The Shamrock
- Website: www.catholiccentral.net

Detroit Catholic Central High School, commonly known as Catholic Central (CC), is a private, all-male college preparatory Catholic high school in Novi, Michigan, United States. Founded in 1928 in Detroit, Michigan by the Archdiocese of Detroit, the school is operated by the Congregation of St. Basil.

The school was originally located on Harper Avenue in Detroit with an enrollment of 280 students; the school has made several moves in its history and now has an enrollment of over 1,000 students at its 60-acre (240,000 m^{2}) campus in Novi. Detroit Catholic Central is currently ranked as the 4th best Catholic High School in the State of Michigan.

== History ==
The current campus, built for $30 million, opened in August 2005. At the time, the school had an enrollment of 920 students.

== Athletics ==
The Shamrocks compete in the Central Division of the Catholic High School League and in Class A/Division I (largest schools) of the Michigan High School Athletic Association.

- Baseball (4 state titles: 1979, 1987, and 1999, 2026)
- Basketball (2 state titles: 1961 and 1976)
- Bowling (1 state title: 2010)
- Cross country (6 state titles: 1983, 1984, 1989, 2001, 2009 and 2010)
- Esports (1 national title: 2024 (Rocket League))
- Football (11 state titles: 1979, 1990, 1992, 1995, 1997, 1998, 2001, 2002, 2003, 2009, 2025)
- Golf (7 state titles: 2003, 2010, 2015, 2016, 2017, 2022, 2024, 2025)
- Ice hockey (19 titles: 1994, 1997, 1999, 2000, 2001, 2002, 2003, 2005, 2009, 2010, 2014, 2015, 2016, 2019, 2021, 2022, 2023, 2024, 2025 )
- Lacrosse (3 state titles: 2018, 2024, 2026)
- Rugby (2 state titles: 2024, 2026)
- Skiing
- Soccer (2 state titles: 2017, 2020)
- Swimming and diving
- Tennis (3 state titles: 1985, 1986, 2010)
- Wrestling (18 state titles: 1969, 1970, 1971, 1974, 1978, 1983, 1988, 2010, 2012, 2013, 2014, 2017, 2018, 2019, 2020, 2023, 2024, 2025)

Catholic Central's athletic rival is Brother Rice High School in Bloomfield Hills.

== Notable alumni ==
- Vince Banonis, All-American collegiate football player, All-NFL player, inducted into College Football Hall of Fame
- Jack Berry, sports journalist
- Thomas E. Brennan, Chief Justice of the Michigan Supreme Court, founder of the Thomas M. Cooley Law School
- Doug Brzezinski, college football and NFL player
- Jerry Burns, College and NFL head coach
- Michael J. Byrnes, Metropolitan Archbishop of Agaña and former Auxiliary Bishop for the Archdiocese of Detroit
- Steve Campbell, ATP Tennis player
- Mike Cox, Michigan Attorney General
- Sean Cox, United States District Judge for the Eastern District of Michigan
- Isaac Darkangelo, professional football player
- Andy Dillon, Michigan Treasurer, Michigan Speaker of the House
- Mike Duggan, Mayor of Detroit
- James Finn Garner, satirist and author of Politically Correct Bedtime Stories
- Joshua Gatt, winger/fullback for Tippeligaen soccer team
- Bryan Gruley, author and Chicago Bureau Chief of The Wall Street Journal
- Charlie Haeger, MLB pitcher
- Stan Heath, college basketball head coach
- Ray Herbert, MLB pitcher
- Art Houtteman, MLB player
- Tom LaGarde, NBA player, member of the 1976 US Olympic Gold Medal Basketball team
- Greg Marx, NFL player
- Thaddeus McCotter, United States Congressman
- John McHale, baseball general manager
- Mark Messner, college and NFL player
- Al Moran, MLB shortstop
- David Moss, NHL forward
- William Moylan, electrical engineer
- Kevin O'Connor, co-founder of online advertising company DoubleClick
- Phil Parsons, NASCAR driver
- James Piot, 2021 U.S. Amateur golf champion
- Vasik Rajlich, International Master in chess and developer of Rybka
- James L. Ryan, senior judge, United States Court of Appeals for the Sixth Circuit
- Paul Rudzinski, NFL linebacker, Green Bay Packers, All-Big Ten Conference, Michigan State
- Chris Sabo, MLB third baseman
- Grant Hartwig, MLB Pitcher
- Myles Amine, Olympian Wrestler
- Jay Sebring, hair stylist, murdered by Manson Family in 1969
- Alex Shelley, professional wrestler
- Anthony E. Siegman, professor of electrical engineering at Stanford University, pioneer in the fields of lasers and masers
- Frank Tanana, MLB pitcher
- Bernard White, actor, screenwriter and film director
- Bill Wightkin, NFL lineman
- Kerry Zavagnin, MLS and US National Team soccer player
- Brandon Naurato, Head coach of Michigan Wolverines men's ice hockey
