= NYC Prep =

US television series

- Jessica, PC, Sebastian, Camille, Taylor and Kelli (clockwise from left)
- Genre: Reality
- Created by: Liz Alderman; Matt O'Brien
- Country of origin: United States
- Original language: English
- No. of seasons: 1
- No. of episodes: 9

Production
- Executive producers: Lenid Rolov; Scott A. Stone
- Running time: 41 minutes
- Production companies: Stone & Company Entertainment

Original release
- Network: Bravo
- Release: June 23 – August 11, 2009

NYC Prep is an American reality television series on Bravo. The series debuted on June 23, 2009. The series follows six Manhattan teenagers in their daily lives as they attended events such as weekend parties, fashion shows, shopping sprees, charity events and dinner parties. The series drew many comparisons to the hit CW television show Gossip Girl because both shows revolved around the lives of Manhattan's "elite" teenagers. Filming was not allowed during school, nor were any school names specifically mentioned on the show, as the schools desired to distance themselves from the show.

== Cast ==
=== Camille Isobel Hughes ===
Camille Isobel Hughes is a student at the Professional Children's School. She was previously a student at the Nightingale-Bamford School. However, Camille decided to attend The College of William & Mary in the fall of 2010 to join the class of 2014. Only her math SAT score was released from her blog; she answered two questions incorrectly on the math portion. Camille has a younger sister, Lillie. Hughes is a member of the Delta Delta Delta sorority. She publicly identifies her involvement in NYC Prep on her Twitter account.

=== Jessica "Jessie" Leavitt ===
Jessica Leavitt is a graduate of the Dwight School on the Upper West Side of New York City. She enrolled in the Fashion Institute of Technology in fall 2009.

=== Kelli Brooke Tomashoff ===
Kelli Brooke Tomashoff is a student at the Birch Wathen Lenox School on the Upper East Side of New York City. She is a member of the school's class of 2010. Kelli's parents live in The Hamptons, while Kelli and her older brother share an apartment. Kelli's mother is a realtor. Her father is the owner of a printing company.

=== Sebastian Oppenheim ===
Sebastian Oppenheim is a student at Ross School, a private school in East Hampton, New York. His father is Jeff Oppenheim, a theater and film director, producer and writer. His mother is Djida Oppenheim. He has a sister, Stephanie. Sebastian is a member of the school's class of 2011, and he attended the College of Charleston after graduation. He majored in International Relations with a concentration in Africa and graduated in the spring of 2015.

=== Taylor DiGiovanni ===
Taylor DiGiovanni is a student who previously attended Stuyvesant High School, a public high school in Battery Park City, New York. Taylor is a member of the school's class of 2011. She later attended City-As-School in New York City.

=== Peter Cary "PC" Peterson ===
Peter Cary "PC" Peterson is a resident of the Upper West Side in New York City. Although the show chronicles his life on the Upper East Side, PC resides on the Upper West Side with his mother. He attended the Dwight School on the Upper West Side as well, and went on to enroll at Rollins College. He is the grandson of billionaire and former US Secretary of Commerce Peter George Peterson. His step-grandmother Joan Ganz Cooney created Sesame Street. PC's mother is Paige Peterson, a noted painter and writer. His father is David Peterson. PC's parents are divorced.

== Episodes ==
No.	Title	Original release date
0	"Preview Special"	June 2, 2009
Cast members are introduced to the audience. Relationships between Jessie and PC, Kelli and Sebastian, and PC and Taylor are established. PC, Taylor, and two other teens attend Fashion Week in New York City.
1	"Top Half of the 1%"	June 23, 2009
Jessie and PC hang out at the most posh spots in the city. Camille worries as she is obsessed with being accepted into Harvard. Kelli realizes she likes Sebastian.
2	"Flip of the Hair"	June 30, 2009
PC has a good time in Cancun while Jessie is in Florida, Kelli is vacationing in the Hamptons and Camille and Taylor are stuck in the city.
3	"What Happens In Mexico..."	July 7, 2009
PC spends Winter Break partying in Mexico. PC's best friend reveals that PC is bisexual. Jessie is in Florida, thinking of him. Kelli while in the Hamptons has a funeral for her dog. Camille and Taylor stay in the city. Taylor can't decide between Cole and Sebastian.
4	"The Virgin Talk"	July 14, 2009
Camille has a dinner party, but of course drama starts up. PC continues to insult Jessie and Kelli. Taylor finally picks between Sebastian and Cole.
5	"The Overachievers"	July 21, 2009
Kelli connects with a voice coach in an effort to punch up her singing career; Taylor tries to balance dating, school and dance; and Jessie has designs on a fashion career. PC sees a psychiatrist and he enrolls himself in a modeling "apprenticeship."
6	"Guests of Guests"	July 28, 2009
The students get ready and adventure at the Fashion Week events. PC causes more drama with Jessie during fashion designer Pamella Roland's show while Sebastian's moves on Kelli don't phase her.
7	"Ivy League Of Their Own"	August 4, 2009
PC and Taylor go to a candy store and talk. Camille goes to Boston to get a tour of Harvard University and is joined by Kelli. There is gossip in the Prep Scene, that PC is taking Taylor as his "protege". PC takes a hotel suite and has a party and invites his senior friends. Taylor doesn't come who says that she is grounded. Cole comes unannounced to the party and has a private discussion with PC about Taylor. At a party, Cole and his friends diss PC.
8	"Charitable to a Fault"	August 11, 2009
Jessie's charity benefit gets positive reviews. PC and Jessie say their goodbyes. Sebastian asks Kelli to sing for the charity event.
9	"Reunion"	August 25, 2009

== Critical reception ==
Metacritic gave the show a Metascore of 42 based on 8 critical reviews, indicating mixed to average reviews. Jezebel's Margaret Hartmann found the show "tame" comparatively to Gossip Girl, "Though each of the cast members fits an obvious Gossip Girl stereotype, real teens can't be shown having sex or taking drugs. Los Angeles Times noted "Chuck and Blair may be prone to saying things like "That's what New York is: Money is power" and "I treat my clothing like children," but somehow the charm is lost when it's coming out of real teenagers' mouths." Salon.com described NYC Prep as "the reality version" of "Gossip Girl" for those who take "Gossip Girl" a little too seriously—and don't mind that real prep school kids are far less witty and fascinating than the scripted ones." Brian Lowry from Variety criticized the fact that parents are about as present as those in the Charlie Brown cartoons and said the main problem is that "the show never gets better than its title -- lacking the sociological insight to score as a documentary or the hyper-real situations and "characters" that would make it sizzle as a soap."

However, Anne Becker from The Daily Beast said "NYC Prep trumps its scripted predecessor, Gossip Girl, in terms of quality guilty-viewing pleasure. Despite its flagging ratings, the series is actually more entertaining than the show from which it was born." New York Daily News's David Hinckley gave the show a 3 stars rating out of 5, writing, "underneath, we also see kids. Yes, rich kids, but also insecure kids coping with the universal dramas of teenagers. That may be the most engaging part of "NYC Prep.""

Dorothy Hutcheson, head of Nightingale-Bamford School, sent a letter home to all Nightingale parents, warning them about the show and the potentially negative portrayal of the school on the show.
