= Darkangelo =

Darkangelo is a surname. Notable people with the surname include:

- Shiann Darkangelo (born 1993), American ice hockey player
- Isaac Darkangelo (born 2000), American football player
