= Latin for All Occasions =

Book by Henry Beard

- Author: Henry Beard
- Original title: Lingua Latina Occasionibus Omnibus
- Publication date: 1990

Latin for All Occasions (Lingua Latina Occasionibus Omnibus) is a 1990 book by Henry Beard, and Latin for Even More Occasions (Lingua Latina Multo Pluribus Occasionibus) is a 1991 sequel. Both contain translations of modern English phrases into mostly literal Latin equivalents.

Beard is known as a humorist but studied Latin for eight years at Harvard. He wrote the Latin himself, but had it checked and polished by scholars Mark Sugars and Winifred Lewellen. The idea for the books was from John Boswell. The illustrations are by Mikhail Ivenitsky and both books were published by Villard Books, a division of Random House.

The translations are mostly direct, so an English expression like "Get your ducks in a row" is translated as Anates tuas in acie instrue. The significance of having ducks lined up would presumably be a mystery to an ancient Roman, or indeed to a non-American.

== Sample phrases ==
- You're fired. Ego te demitto.
- Look out, I'm going to barf! Cave, vomiturus sum!
- Oh! Was I speaking Latin again? Vah! Denuone Latine loquebar?
- Your fly is open. Braccae tuae hiant
- You're beautiful! Pulcher es! (masculine), Pulchra es! (feminine)
- Honey, I'm home! Melita, domi adsum!

Some of the phrases are not even intended to be helpful, and are included instead purely for the purposes of comedy:

- Infernal machine! Give me a beverage or give me back my money! Machina improba! Vel mihi ede potum vel mihi redde nummos meos!
