= Richard Yeend =

Cartoonist and type designer

Richard Yeend (born 5 April 1945) is a political cartoonist, type designer and newspaper designer.

== Early life and education ==
Yeend was born in London and educated at the Canterbury Cathedral Choir School, King's College, Taunton and Cambridge School of Art (now part of Anglia Ruskin University). He was art editor of Varsity, Granta and Allotrope.

== Career ==
In 1969 he replaced Abu Abraham as a cartoonist on The Guardian, also drawing weekly caricatures and political cartoons for The Sunday Times. The two papers shared the same building and presses. His drawings appeared in the Abendzeitung, Manager Magazin, Le Monde, Radio Times, Time Out, Ink and The Sun.

Yeend designed a neon sign for Lloyd's Bank in Picadilly Circus and in 1971 the poster and costumes for the Royal Court Theatre's production of Bertolt Brecht's Man Equals Man. In 1974 he moved to the U.S. freelancing for The New York Times Magazine, Soho Weekly News and Screw. From 1975 until 1978, he was art director of the Boston Herald American: he redesigned the paper, introducing phototypesetting and encouraging news photography. The paper won three Pulitzer Prizes for photography during this time, two by Stanley Foreman and one by the department's coverage of the North Eastern Blizzard.

In May 1978, Yeend moved to The New York Times, responsible for financial sections and graphics, and drawing sports cartoons. Later that year, during the city's newspaper strike, he joined Chris Cerf, Tony Hendra and George Plimpton to lay out Not the New York Times, a three section parody selling 250,000 copies.

In 1987, Yeend became art director and political cartoonist for the International Herald Tribune in Paris, moving to Die Welt in Berlin in 1998. He also drew pocket cartoons for the paper and the logotype for the Berliner Morgenpost. From 1999 until retiring, he was the art director of The Wall Street Journal Europe, drawing caricature and stipple hedcuts.

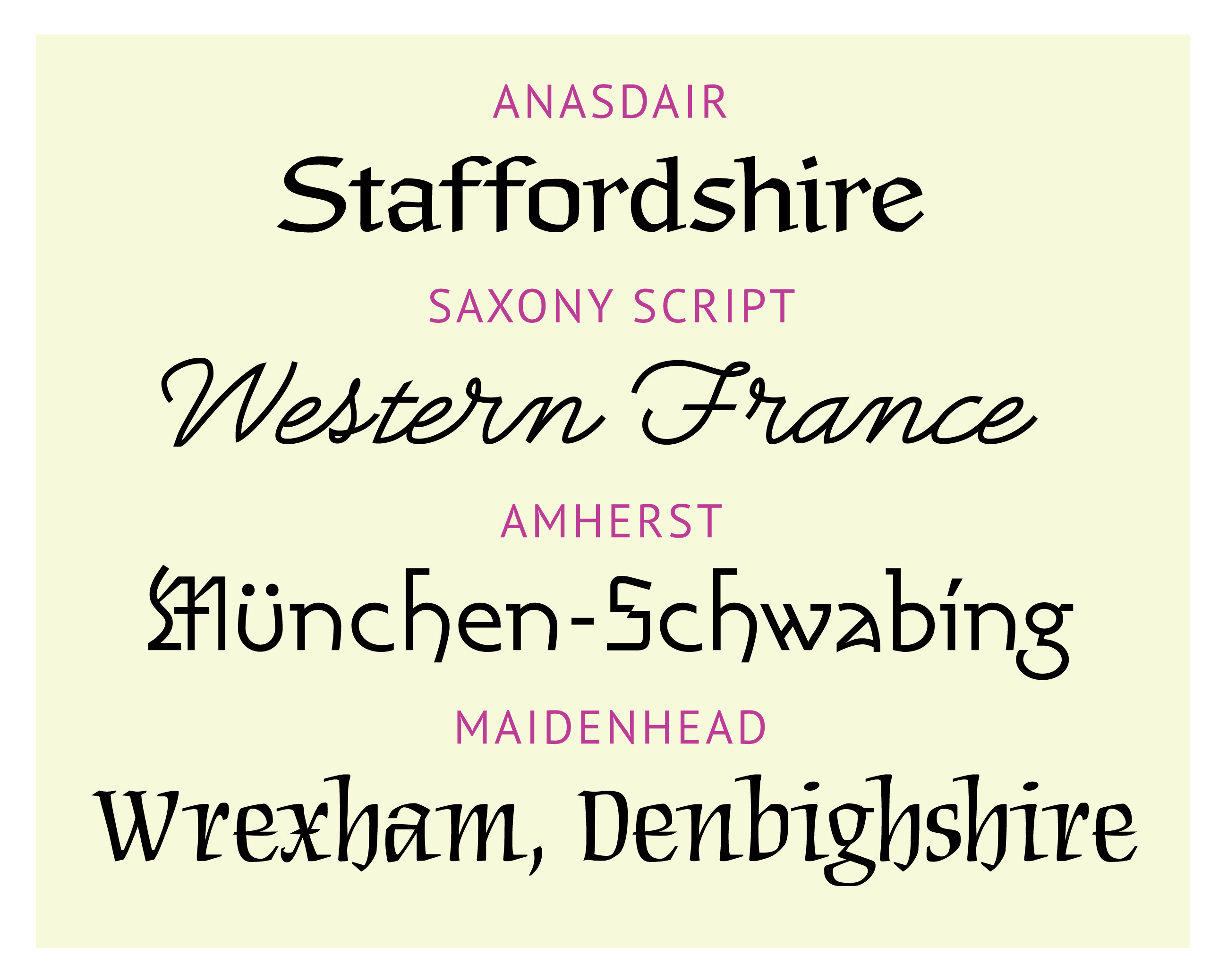
Specimens of typefaces by Richard Yeend

In 1995, Yeend submitted a font to Robin Nicholas, head of type design at Monotype, who encouraged him to design more typefaces, adding Abbot Uncial, Bangor, Broadstreet, Broadstreet Text, Comix, Hoyerswerda Fraktur, Saxony Script, Maidenhead and Xmas to their library. Linotype added Archispado, Amherst, Amherst Gothic Split, Anasdair, Bandalero, Buckingham Fraktur, Burgstaedt Antiqua, Hawkhurst, Italienne and Neuseidler.

In 2018, Markosia published Yeend's graphic novel "The King's Irish: A Celtic Tiger Earns his Stripes" under the pseudonym J. R. MacCléirach and in 2023 "Tex Twitter Meets the Cherokee". In 2024 they also published "ABC: Better Handwriting for Good Sports".

== Personal ==
Since 2017 Yeend is a Belgian citizen and lives in Brussels.
