= Blackie (American horse) =

Cutting and cavalry horse

Coordinates: 37.8963°N 122.4895°W

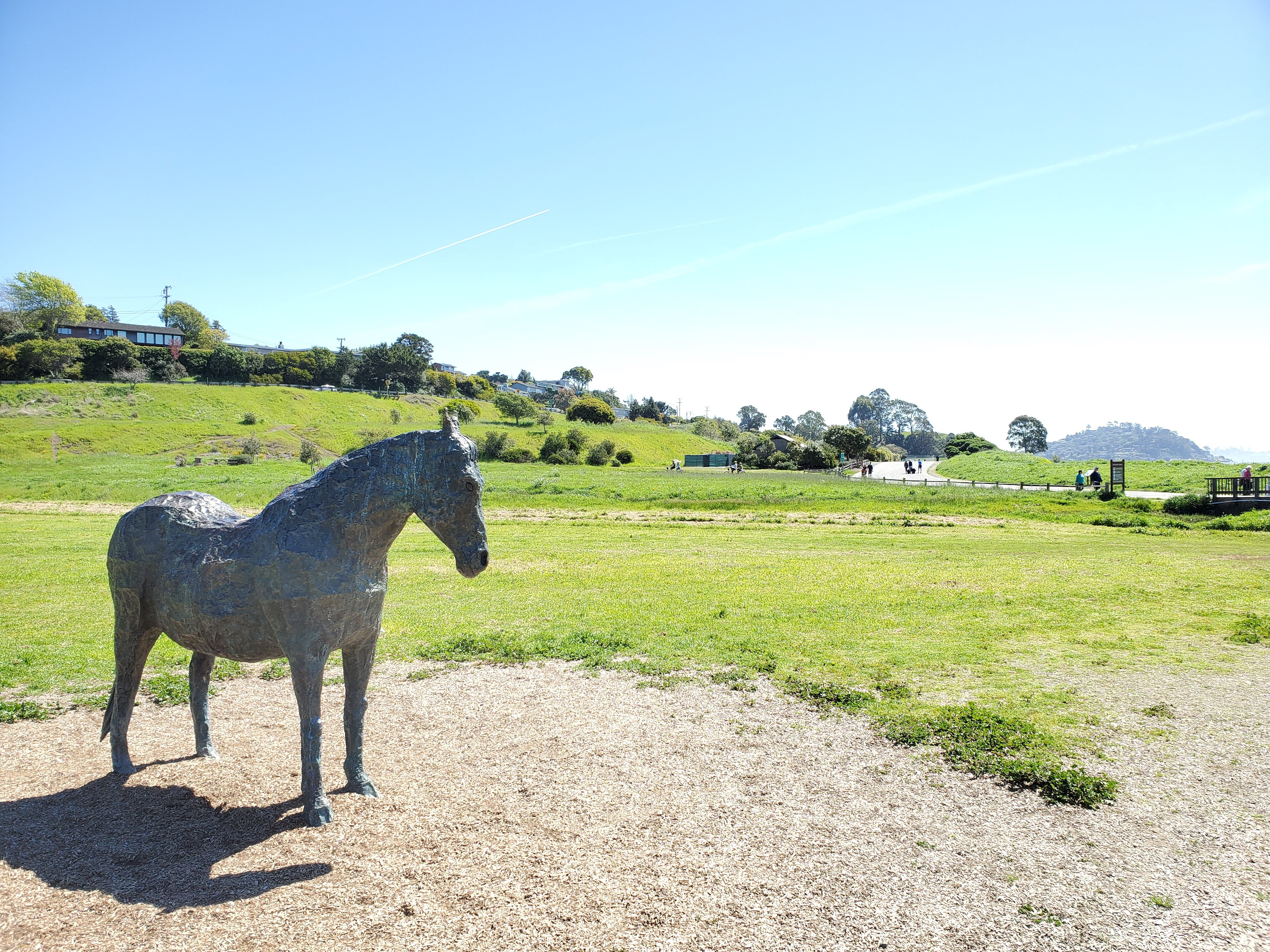
Statue honoring Blackie in Blackie's Pasture, Tiburon, California

Blackie was an American horse who became locally famous in Tiburon, California, for standing in the same spot in his pasture for 28 years. After his death, a statue of the horse was erected in a park called Blackie's Pasture.

== Life ==
The recorded history of Blackie's early life is limited. According to his owners, brothers John and Anthony Connell (also called Anthony L. O’Connell in articles), Blackie, a black horse, arrived in California in 1926 or 1927, reportedly from Kansas, and was used as a cutting horse in rodeos. Some sources claim that after his rodeo career, he was acquired by the U.S. Cavalry and served in Yosemite Valley.

Connell put Blackie out in what would become his "famous" pasture at the corner of Tiburon Boulevard and Trestle Glen Road around 1938. The horse soon became a familiar sight standing in his favorite spot and was reportedly fed apples and carrots by local children. In 1965, Tiburon Town Council approved plans for Tiburon Boulevard to be re-routed through Blackie's pasture. However, residents convinced the town council to preserve the pasture. When the road was built, John Connell and Blackie attended the ribbon-cutting ceremony.

== Death and legacy ==
Blackie died on February 27, 1966, after collapsing the previous day. The Marin County Health Department approved his burial in his pasture. A plaque was installed at the grave with a dedication ceremony where a local teenager described Blackie as "a special horse, a children's horse."

The Tiburon Peninsula Foundation erected the life-size bronze statue of Blackie by artist Albert Guibara in Blackie's Pasture in 1995.

In 2006, a children's book, Blackie, the Horse Who Stood Still, was published by an imprint of Random House. It was written by Christopher Cerf and illustrated by Paige Peterson.
