= Henry Beard =

American novelist

- Born: Henry Nichols Beard; June 7, 1945 (age 81); New York City, U.S.
- Occupations: Writer, magazine editor
- Writing career
- Period: 1964–present
- Genre: Humor
- Notable works: Bored of the Rings; National Lampoon

Henry Nichols Beard (born June 7, 1945) is an American humorist, one of the founders of the magazine National Lampoon and the author of several best-selling books.

== Life and career ==
Beard, a great-grandson of 14th Vice President John C. Breckinridge, was born into a well-to-do family and grew up at the Westbury Hotel on East 69th Street in Manhattan. His relationship with his parents was cool, to judge by his quip, "I never saw my mother up close."

He graduated from the Taft School in 1963, where he was a leader at the humor magazine, and he decided to become a humor writer after reading Catch-22.

He then went to Harvard University (from which he graduated in 1967) and joined its humor magazine, the Harvard Lampoon, which circulated nationally. Much of the credit for the Lampoon's success during the mid-1960s is given to Beard and Douglas Kenney, who was in the class a year after Beard's. In 1968, Beard and Kenney wrote the successful parody Bored of the Rings. Beard and Kenney would become longtime friends and collaborators. Kenney described Beard as "the oldest guy who was ever a teenager".

In 1969, Beard, Kenney and Rob Hoffman became the founding editors of the National Lampoon, which reached an average monthly circulation of over 830,000 for the year 1974 (and the October issue of that year topped a million sales). One of Beard's short stories published there, "The Last Recall", was included in the 1973 Best Detective Stories of the Year. During the early 1970s, Beard was also in the Army Reserve, which he hated.

In 1975, the three founders cashed in on a buy-out agreement for National Lampoon; Beard received US$2.8 million and left the magazine. After an "unhappy" attempt at screenwriting, he turned to writing books of humor. Those that have reached the New York Times Best Seller list are Sailing: A Sailor's Dictionary (1981, with Roy McKie), Miss Piggy's Guide to Life (1981), Leslie Nielsen's Stupid Little Golf Book (1995, with Leslie Nielsen), French for Cats (1992, with John Boswell), and O.J.'s Legal Pad (1995, with John Boswell and Ron Barrett). Other notable books include Latin for All Occasions (1990), The Official Politically Correct Dictionary and Handbook (1992, with Christopher Cerf), and What's Worrying Gus? (1995, with John Boswell).

=== Personal life ===
The New York Times has described Beard as "enigmatic". Among the enigmas, apparently, is his birthdate. Not even the year of his birth appears in the Library of Congress Cataloging-in-Publication data of his books or in various Web and print sources. However, Josh Karp's biography of Doug Kenney says that Beard was "a nearly thirty-year-old man" when he left the National Lampoon on March 18, 1975, and an article published on November 29, 1987, gives his age as 42. The birth year given above, 1945, is based on these two statements. Public records show that a HENRY N BEARD was born on June 7, 1945, in New York, NY.

According to Josh Karp, Beard is remembered from his Harvard years as patrician, a pipe smoker, not over-concerned with the appearance or cleanliness of his clothes, misanthropic but not malicious, capable of understanding and organizing any subject, and a gifted student who occasionally wrote parodic papers. He was prematurely mature and the Harvard Lampoon's arbiter. As a comic writer he excelled at parody, and his hero was S. J. Perelman. All these characteristics meant that he was an excellent partner with Kenney, who was flamboyant, fond of poses, and given to seeing humor where others recoiled.

The comedy writer Chris Miller remembers that Beard "knew everything" and that he said on leaving the Lampoon that he was sick of being the father to all the writers. (Beard would have been about 30.) The comic writer and actor Tony Hendra says that at the beginning of Beard's tenure, he was painfully shy, though he was the magazine's authority over what material was used. In the next few years, he went through "the greening of Beard", growing his hair, switching from cheap beer to expensive whiskey, and in 1974, forming a relationship with the writer Gwyneth Cravens.

In 1991, an article in a reliable publication said that Beard and Cravens divided their time between Manhattan and a renovated boat shed in East Hampton and referred to them as partners. A 2006 interview in a different publication said that Beard and Cravens had married. Also in 2006, Karp wrote that "reportedly" the couple had added California to their list of addresses and that Beard played golf almost daily but never kept score.

In the movie A Futile and Stupid Gesture he is played by Irish actor Domhnall Gleeson.

== Selected bibliography ==
- Bored of the Rings (with Doug Kenney) (1969)
- Sailing: A Sailor's Dictionary (with Roy McKie) (1981)
- Miss Piggy's Guide to Life (1981)
- Cooking: A Cook's Dictionary (with Roy McKie) (1985)
- The Pentagon Catalog: Ordinary Products at Extraordinary Prices (with Christopher Cerf) (1986)
- Golfing: A Duffer's Dictionary (with Roy McKie) (1987)
- Latin for All Occasions (1990)
- Latin for Even More Occasions (1992)
- Advanced French for Exceptional Cats (1992)
- French for Cats: All The French Your Cat Will Ever Need (1993)
- The Way Things Really Work: (And How They Actually Happen) (with Ron Barrett) (1993)
- Poetry for Cats: The Definitive Anthology of Distinguished Feline Verse (1994)
- The Official Politically Correct Dictionary and Handbook (with Christopher Cerf) (1994)
- Sex and Dating: The Official Politically Correct Guide (with Christopher Cerf) (1994)
- The Official Sexually Correct Dictionary and Handbook (with Christopher Cerf) (1995)
- O.J.'s Legal Pad (with John Boswell and Ron Barrett) (1995)
- What's Worrying Gus?: The True Story of a Big City Bear (with John Boswell) (1995)
- Leslie Nielsen's Stupid Little Golf Book (with Leslie Nielsen) (1995)
- The Unshredded Files of Hillary and Bill Clinton (with John Boswell) (1997)
- Bad Golf My Way (with Leslie Nielsen) (1997)
- Zen for Cats (1997)
- The Official Exceptions to the Rules of Golf (1997)
- Mulligan's Laws (1998)
- Bill Gates' Private Super Secret Private Laptop (with John Boswell) (1998)
- Computing: A Hacker's Dictionary (with Roy McKie) (1999)
- Rationalizations to Live By (with John Boswell) (2000)
- Where's Saddam? (with John Boswell) (2003)
- X-Treme Latin: Unleash Your Inner Gladiator (2004)
- The Dick Cheney Code (2004)
- French Cats Don't Get Fat: The Secrets of La Cuisine Feline (2005)
- A Cat's Night Before Christmas (with John Boswell) (2005)
- A Dog's Night Before Christmas (with John Boswell) (2005)
- Murphy's Laws of Golf (2007)
- The Official Rules of Bad Golf (2007)
- Golf: An Unofficial and Unauthorized History of the World's Most Preposterous Sport (2009)
- Encyclopedia Paranoica (with Christopher Cerf) (2012)
- Spinglish: The Definitive Dictionary of Deliberately Deceptive Language (with Christopher Cerf) (2015)
