= Social Security (play) =

Play by Andrew Bergman

Social Security production logo

Social Security is a play by Andrew Bergman.

The lives of trendy Manhattan art gallery owners Barbara and David Kahn are upended when her Mineola housewife sister Trudy deposits their eccentric mother Sophie on the couple's doorstep while she and her husband Martin head to Buffalo to rescue their sexually precocious college student daughter from a menage a trois with two men. Barbara and David introduce Sophie to suave nonagenarian artist Maurice Koenig, who offers to paint her portrait and soon begins to brighten her life in ways she never expected in her twilight years.

After twenty-six previews, the Broadway production, directed by Mike Nichols, opened on April 17, 1986, at the Ethel Barrymore Theatre, where it ran for 388 performances. The cast included Marlo Thomas as Barbara, Ron Silver as David, Joanna Gleason as Trudy, Olympia Dukakis as Sophie, Stefan Schnabel as Maurice, and Kenneth Welsh as Martin. Later in the run, Marilu Henner and Cliff Gorman assumed the roles of Barbara and David. Valerie Harper was originally hired to replace Marlo Thomas, but Harper quit during rehearsals and was replaced by Henner.

Drama Desk Awards went to Gleason for Outstanding Featured Actress in a Play and Tony Walton for Outstanding Set Design.
