= Free to Be... a Family =

1988 television special

Free to Be... A Family is a television special hosted by Marlo Thomas broadcast on December 14, 1988. It was a joint production of ABC and Soviet Union (three years before its dissolution) television. It was nominally a sequel to the popular 1974 ABC Afterschool Special Free to Be... You and Me, also hosted by Thomas. Among the performers on the 1988 show were The Muppets, Jon Bon Jovi, Penn and Teller, Carly Simon, Lily Tomlin, and Robin Williams.

After her husband, talk show host Phil Donahue, hosted a series of U.S.–Soviet space-bridge telecasts throughout the '80s, Thomas decided that this kind of international understanding and cooperation should start at a much earlier age. "The purpose of the special was to emphasize the fact that kids in the U.S. and Russia are much the same and can relate to one another, in hopes of bringing peace between the nations." Prior to the television special, there was a book, with contributions by Christopher Cerf among others, and a record album, both under the same title.

It won the 1989 Emmy Award for Outstanding Children's Program.

== Cast ==
- Marlo Thomas as herself
- Tatyana Vedeneyeva as herself
- Robin Williams as himself
- Lily Tomlin as Ernestine the Telephone Operator
- Carly Simon as herself
- Penn and Teller as themselves
- Jon Bon Jovi as himself
- Jim Henson as Kermit the Frog
- Frank Oz as Miss Piggy
- Kevin Clash as Elmo, Unemployed Bear
- Camille Bonora as Meryl Sheep
- Galina Marchenko as Khryusha

== Other editions ==
- A&M Records SP 5196, 1988 soundtrack, Free to Be... a Family
- Family Home Entertainment, 1993 VHS, Free to Be... a Family
- Marlo Thomas. Free to Be a Family: A Book About All Kinds of Belonging, Bantam, October 1987, ISBN 978-0553052350
