= Kevin O'Connor (entrepreneur) =

American technical entrepreneur (born 1961)

- Born: April 4, 1961 (age 65); Livonia, Michigan
- Education: University of Michigan
- Occupations: Entrepreneur & Venture Capitalist

Kevin O'Connor (born April 4, 1961) is an American entrepreneur and co-founder of Graphiq, a research engine founded in Santa Barbara in 2009. Previously, O'Connor was a co-founder of DoubleClick, an internet advertisement-technology, and founder of O'Connor Ventures, a venture capital firm that invests in early stage companies, including COR, 9Star, Surfline, Travidia, Procore and CampusExplorer.

== Early life ==
O'Connor was born in Livonia, Michigan, a suburb outside Detroit. A graduate of Detroit Catholic Central High School, O'Connor received his bachelor's degree in 1983 from the University of Michigan.

== Career ==
O'Connor was one of the founders of Cincinnati-based Intercomputer Communications Corporation (ICC), a microcomputer to mainframe inter-connectivity company. When ICC was acquired by Digital Communications Associates in 1992, O'Connor eventually became its Chief Technology Officer and a Vice President of Research and Development.

O'Connor quit DCA in 1995. That year, O'Connor met Chris Klaus who had just started Internet Security Systems (ISS). O'Connor was the initial investor and recruited Tom Noonan to become the CEO. ISS went public in 1999 and was sold to IBM Corp. for $1.4bb in 2006. In late 1995, O'Connor began DoubleClick with Dwight Merriman in O'Connor's basement in Alpharetta, Georgia, eventually moving the company to New York City to be closer to media companies and advertising agencies. They hired Kevin P. Ryan who eventually became the CEO of the company. DoubleClick went public on Nasdaq in 1998. DoubleClick grew to over 2,400 employees in 25 countries though in the great "dot com bust" in 2000/2001 the company downsized to about 1,200 employees and in the process became very profitable. In 2005 the company was sold to private equity firm Hellman & Friedman for approximately $1.1 billion. In 2007, Google announced its intention to acquire DoubleClick for $3.1 billion.

O'Connor is also co-author of the book The Map of Innovation: Creating Something Out of Nothing (ISBN 1400048311), which was published in 2003.

He runs the venture capital firm ScOp Venture Capital, where he invests in early-stage software companies which including Well Health, Surfline, HG Insights, and Procore Technologies.

One of his past ventures, Graphiq, is what O'Connor has described as a "research engine," essentially a search engine that lets consumers compare everything from colleges to cell phones. The company, based in Santa Barbara, California, experienced a revenue jump from $65,000 in 2011 to $6.8 million in 2013, a 10,298.5 percent increase. In 2017, O’Connor sold Graphiq to Amazon.

In 2013, O'Connor committed $1 million of his personal fortune to fight a patent infringement lawsuit brought by Lumen View Technology, a non-practicing entity, commonly referred to as a "patent troll" by patent-reform advocates. Lumen View's patent was invalidated in court, and a federal judge went on to award FindTheBest its court costs. “Businesses shouldn’t have to deal with this,” O’Connor said, explaining his decision to pay out-of-pocket to fight the lawsuit in court, rather than settle for a likely much smaller amount. “A shell company should not be able to send a boilerplate demand letter, alleging infringement on a patent that is invalidated when challenged in court. Let companies focus on innovating and creating American jobs.”

In 2018, O'Connor was awarded the Venky Narayanamurti Entrepreneurial Leadership Award presented by the UC Santa Barbara College of Engineering.
