= The Scout (1994 film) =

1994 film by Michael Ritchie

- Theatrical release poster
- Directed by: Michael Ritchie
- Screenplay by: Andrew Bergman; Albert Brooks; Monica Johnson
- Based on: "Scout" by Roger Angell
- Produced by: Andre Morgan; Albert S. Ruddy
- Starring: Albert Brooks; Brendan Fraser; Dianne Wiest
- Cinematography: László Kovács
- Edited by: Don Zimmerman; Pembroke J. Herring
- Music by: Bill Conti
- Distributed by: 20th Century Fox
- Release date: September 30, 1994
- Running time: 101 minutes
- Language: English
- Budget: $20 million
- Box office: $2,694,234

The Scout is a 1994 American comedy film starring Brendan Fraser and Albert Brooks and directed by Michael Ritchie. The film is based on the 1976 The New Yorker article "Scout" by Roger Angell.

== Plot ==
After the New York Yankees' latest prospect Tommy Lacy suffers a humiliating bout of stage fright in his debut for the team, scout Al Percolo, who discovered Tommy, is punished by being sent to the Mexican countryside to look for his next find.

Al's efforts are fruitless until he encounters Steve Nebraska, a young American with a consistent 100+ MPH fastball and a perfect batting average. The childlike Steve immediately agrees to join the Yankees when Al asks him, but when Al calls the team's general manager Ron Wilson to report his find, he is fired and told not to return. Al defies the order and brings Steve back to the States anyway. The first indication that all may not be right with Steve occurs when he panics at Newark International Airport when he and Al are momentarily separated. Later, at Al's apartment, Steve thrashes in his sleep, screaming at an unseen assailant.

Al arranges an open audition at Yankee Stadium in front of representatives from every Major League Baseball team. After Steve strikes out Keith Hernandez and homers off Bret Saberhagen, a bidding war breaks out. The Yankees win the bid war, signing Steve to a $55 million contract, but after Steve violently snaps at press photographers, team management demands that he be psychiatrically evaluated and cleared before he plays his first game.

Al picks the first listed psychiatrist in the phone book, a Doctor H. Aaron, and hopes that the evaluation will be swift, so that he and Steve can get on with life. After examining Steve, however, Dr. Aaron finds him to be deeply troubled and so severely abused as a child that he has blocked almost every memory of his early life. Desperate for Steve to play so that both can get paid, Al begs Dr. Aaron to clear Steve for play, on the condition that she sees Steve every day before he makes his MLB debut.

Life with Steve proves difficult for Al; Steve throws plates at reporters outside the apartment, upstages Tony Bennett at his own show, and argues with Al over what he does with his free time. At a press conference, Al lies about Steve's past. Dr. Aaron is livid when she finds out, but Al points out that Steve's behavior stems from her helping him acknowledge and deal with his past. Al pleads with Dr. Aaron to continue the good work she is doing for Steve. When the Yankees reach the World Series, however, Steve is suddenly depressed. Worse yet, he is contractually obligated to pitch in Game 1.

A sold-out Yankee Stadium waits for Steve's debut in Game 1 of the World Series. When Steve is spotted on the roof of the stadium, Al sends for a helicopter to fetch him, then climbs up to plead with him to come down. Steve adamantly refuses, and Al, risking his own career, tells Steve that he can walk away from it all, no strings attached. Touched by Al's selflessness, Steve relents. His spirits greatly lifted, he boards the copter to make his grand entrance.

Steve pitches a perfect game, striking out 27 St. Louis Cardinals batters on 81 consecutive strikes, and hits two solo home runs in a 2-0 Yankees victory. As Steve acknowledges Al as the Yankees celebrate his efforts, Al smiles proudly.

== Cast ==
- Albert Brooks as Al Percolo
- Brendan Fraser as Steve Nebraska
- Dianne Wiest as Doctor H. Aaron
- Anne Twomey as Jennifer
- Lane Smith as Ron Wilson
- Michael Rapaport as Tommy Lacy
- Bob Costas as Himself
- George M. Steinbrenner III as Himself
- Tony Bennett as Himself
- Barry Shabaka Henley as McDermott
- John Capodice as Caruso
- Art Garfield as Stan
- Marcia Rodd as Mrs. Lacy
- Steve Eastin as Clubhouse Manager
- Lee Weaver as Ben
- John LaMotta as Elevator Guard
- Harsh Nayyar as Cab Driver
- J. K. Simmons as Assistant Coach
- Josh Clark as Reporter
- John Roland as Himself
- Rosanna Scotto as Herself
- Bobby Murcer as Himself
- Steve Garvey as Himself
- Tim McCarver as Himself
- Tom Kelly as Himself
- John Sterling as Himself
- Ken Brett as Himself
- Bret Saberhagen as Himself
- Reggie Smith as Himself
- Keith Hernandez as Himself
- Roy Firestone as Himself
- Bob Sheppard as Himself
- Bob Tewksbury as Himself
- Ozzie Smith as Himself

== Production ==
The film was based on a Roger Angell article "Scout" published in The New Yorker in 1976, which had been optioned by Andrew Bergman's producing partner. Bergman wrote his script for Peter Falk to play the scout Al Percolo and Jim Belushi to play the player Steve Nebraska. "There were honestly five different versions of this movie," says Bergman. "The original version was, he found this guy in Mexico who’s the second white man ever to receive these injections, the first being Babe Ruth. And it was this political guy on the run. It was a completely different kind of movie."

Falk was not available then Walter Matthau was going to make it with Michael Ritchie. The project did not proceed until years later with Ritchie directing and Albert Brooks playing the scout Al. "That wasn’t my conception at all," said Bergman. "The original conception was much more bananas. The Scout still has glimmers of the original, but not doing the original is high up on my very large list of regrets, because Peter was born to play that guy. He’s so obtuse and that tunnel-vision thing he had was just great.”

In a July 1999 interview with Gavin Smith in Film Comment, Brooks said that The Scout was originally intended for Rodney Dangerfield. "It was lying around, never going to get made, and I said I would like to do that."

Brooks said that he contributed to a rewrite of the script because "it was written very silly." The version he worked on, he said, "did not end like Rocky with that bullshit big ending." But according to Brooks, the studio forced Ritchie to change the ending.

Bob Costas, Tim McCarver, Tony Bennett, John Sterling, Keith Hernandez, Bret Saberhagen, George Steinbrenner, Ozzie Smith, Bob Tewksbury and Bobby Murcer, among others, play themselves in the film.

== Reception ==
The Scout was a box-office flop and the reviews were predominantly negative, with TV Guide stating, "The Scout feels like a classic case of too many cooks spoiling the broth." Variety also negatively reviewed the film, saying that Brooks and Ritchie "never quite commit to either of the movie's disparate chords -- bailing out of the batter's box in terms of the psychological drama and, after some amusing moments at the outset, generally steering clear of broad comedy." Time magazine's Richard Schickel praised the film, writing, "The Scout is the best comedy-fantasy about baseball ever made, which goes to show that if Hollywood keeps trying, eventually someone will get it right." The film holds a 31% rating on Rotten Tomatoes based on 26 reviews.

== See also ==
- List of baseball films
