= Alligator (novel) =

1962 parody novel

- Language: English
- Publisher: Harvard Lampoon
- Publication date: 1962

Alligator is a parody of Ian Fleming's James Bond novels. It was written by Christopher Cerf and Michael K. Frith. It was published in 1962 by the Harvard Lampoon. Subsequent editions of the book were squashed by Fleming and his estate.

== Plot ==
J*ames B*ond takes on Lacertus Alligator, head of the evil organization TOOTH (The Organization Organized to Hate). Alligator's face is the color purple. His plan for world domination includes the kidnapping the Houses of Parliament. And not just the members of Parliament, but also the buildings. Alligator ends up also kidnapping the Queen as well.

== Overview ==
Apart from Bond's name always appearing in the book as B*ond, other references to recurring characters include Pennyfarthing instead of Miss Moneypenny. Felix Leiter appears as Felix Ronson and Jamaican fisherman Quarrel is named Squabble. Bond's boss, M, is simply known as *. The book also parodies Bond's ordering of drinks. Instead of the usual 'Shaken, not stirred,' B*ond specifies every single thing he orders to eat. When B*ond faces down Alligator at the card table, they play Go Fish.

The cover of Alligator parodies the Signet Books paperback covers used for the Fleming novels in the 1960s. The back cover of the book lists other fictitious B*ond novels, including Lightningrod, Tomorrow We Live, Monsieur Butterfly and Scuba Do-Or-Die.

The book was published in paperback and was such a success that Bennett Cerf, (Christopher Cerf's father) considered bringing out a hardcover edition from Random House. He wrote Fleming for his blessing and Fleming responded saying how much he hated the book. Cerf and Frith were reportedly confused, thinking that the Bond books were supposed to be funny.

The initial run was limited to 100,000 copies because Fleming's American publisher found the book too similar to the real Bond books. Bennett Cerf was interested in publishing a hard cover edition of the book, but changed his mind when he saw Fleming's response. (Random House was just about to publish Fleming's children's book Chitty-Chitty-Bang-Bang.)

A copy of the book was found in the paperwork between President John F. Kennedy and Special Assistant to the President Arthur M. Schlesinger Jr.

In attempts to re-print the book, or to develop the story into a different form, Cerf and Frith found that Fleming had in his will specifically prohibited them from doing anything involving Bond.

The book has been out-of-print for over 45 years.
