= Graphiq =

Data mining and visualization company

- Available in: English
- Owner: Amazon
- Website: graphiq.com
- Current status: Active

Graphiq (formerly FindTheBest) is a semantic technology company that uses artificial intelligence to rapidly create interactive data-driven infographics. Its intent is similar to Wolfram Alpha which is designed to provide users with direct information on a variety of subjects rather than going through a search engine.

Graphiq is based in Santa Barbara, California and has raised $32 million in total funding from venture funding companies by 2013.

In May 2017, Amazon acquired Graphiq for an estimated $50 million. Graphiq announced that its features for news publishers would no longer be available on July 21, 2017, as part of the transition.

== History ==
The company was founded in 2009 as FindTheBest by Kevin J. O'Connor, former CEO and co-founder of DoubleClick, Scott Leonard and Brayton Johnson. The site was publicly launched in 2010 with nine comparison categories, including health, education, business, and sports. The venture was funded with an initial investment of $750,000 each from the founders, followed by $2 million by Kleiner Perkins Caufield & Byers in December 2010.

In 2011, Kleiner Perkins Caufield & Byers invested an additional $4 million into the company. It also received an additional $11 million in Series B funding from New World Ventures, Montgomery & Co., Kleiner Perkins Caufield & Byers, Pritzker Group Venture Capital and others. In May 2014, FindTheBest had reached 23 million visits per month and employed a team of approximately 110 people.

In 2011, it launched FindTheData.com. The AssistMe option was added in 2012. In January 2013, the company made its first international expansion and launched sites in Spain, South Korea, and New Zealand. In April 2013, the company launched sites in Germany and the United Kingdom. Its real estate research site FindTheHome launched in 2014.

In August 2015, the company rebranded to Graphiq Inc. and launched a new set of tools for publishers. At the time, the company's database included 1 billion entities, 120 billion attributes and 25 billion relationships.

== Product ==
Graphiq's flagship product for online content creators, Graphiq Search, allows users to access its library of 10B+ interactive visualizations. Additionally, Graphiq offers 22 vertically aligned research sites that allow consumers to research important topics. The company states that 33 million visitors use Graphiq research sites every month. The data from Graphiq is mined from a variety of public and private sources and presented to users in a visual table with filters and ratings.

The company's primary consumer interface is a group of vertically aligned research sites, which let users research products and services on a desktop or mobile device They can also add or edit product and service listings. Each edit is reviewed by Graphiq's team before it goes live.

The company's products for online content creators and journalists included Graphiq Search, Feed and Plugins. Publishers that use Graphiq visualizations include AOL, MSN, The International Business Times and Hearst Newspapers. In August 2016, Reuters announced a partnership with Graphiq to deliver a suite of interactive visualizations to Reuters customers. In October 2016, The Associated Press announced an expanded collaboration with Graphiq to introduce paired visualizations with AP text content.

=== Sites ===
As of February 15, 2017

- AllPatents.com
- ArmsRack.com
- AxleGeeks.com
- CareerTrends.com
- Corporate.com
- Credio.com
- FindTheBest.com
- FindTheCompany.com
- GearSuite.com
- HealthGrove.com
- HomeOwl.com
- InsideGov.com
- MooseRoots.com
- PetBreeds.com
- PickBan.com
- Pikasaur.com
- Platform.com
- PointAfter.com
- PrettyFamous.com
- SoftwareInsider.com
- SpecOut.com
- StartClass.com

== Business model ==
The site attempts to bridge the gap between search engines like Google and review-type services like Yelp. O'Connor describes it as a "research engine." Each research site is free for consumers and monetized with advertisements. The visualizations pull data from the same database that powers the research sites and each visualization includes the Graphiq logo and a link back to one of the company's research sites where they monetize users with advertisements.
