= 1978 New York City newspaper strike =

The 1978 New York City newspaper strike ran from August 10 to November 5, 1978, a total of 88 days. It affected the New York City newspaper industry, shutting down all three of the city's major newspapers: The New York Times, New York Daily News, and the New York Post.

== Origins ==
The multi-union strike was led by pressmen and halted production of the three papers, with no editions being published since August 9, 1978. Other unions who walked out included those for machinists, paperhandlers, truck mechanics, and drivers. The strike occurred due to the three newspapers each issuing new work rulings which significantly decreased requirements concerning the level of staffing. Unlike many strikes, wage levels were not a major issue. More than 10,000 employees were either striking or out of work in support of one of the striking unions.

== Effects ==
During the outage, several strike papers popped into existence, being sold on newsstands and with bylines from the three regular papers; these included The City News, The New York Daily Press, and The New York Daily Metro. One existing paper that momentarily benefited during this time was Unification Church-owned The News World, which had been launched in 1976 and reached its highest-ever circulation of 400,000 during the strike; some well-known reporters for the three closed papers wrote for it as well. Two months into the strike, a parody of The New York Times called Not The New York Times was distributed in the city, with contributors such as Carl Bernstein, Christopher Cerf, Tony Hendra, and George Plimpton.

Contrary to initial expectations, New York businesses such as restaurants, theaters, hotels, and retail stores did not suffer during the strike, finding alternate ways to advertise their presence and offerings. What is sometimes claimed as an unanticipated consequence of the strike was the turnaround in the 1978 New York Yankees season. The team, who had been trailing the Boston Red Sox of that year by 14 games, turned things around in a late-season push and eventually won a dramatic tie-breaker game against the Red Sox and then the 1978 World Series. The Yankees organization at that time included several volatile personalities, including owner George Steinbrenner, oft-hired and fired manager Billy Martin, and slugger Reggie Jackson, and the battles among them had been receiving considerable media attention, particularly headlines in the News and the Post. Once the papers went on strike, it is said, the press distractions diminished and the team could focus on playing well. At the time, a Yankees representative noted that "We've heard that theory, but we started our winning streak when the papers were still publishing." The belief that the strike enabled the team's turnaround was still being given credit decades later; in 2018 longtime sportswriter and Red Sox historian Gordon Edes wondered if the newspaper strike had been a bigger villain than "Bucky Bleepin' Dent" for Red Sox fans.

== Resumption of publication ==
During negotiations, Theodore W. Kheel served as an unofficial mediator between the two sides and played an important role in the progress of the talks. On October 5, the Post resumed publication when Rupert Murdoch, its owner and publisher, signed an agreement with the pressmen; however, the Daily News and the Times were still not being published. Murdoch's agreement essentially said that the Post would abide by whatever terms would be eventually worked out between the unions and the other two papers. The Post had been shut down for 56 days.

The Times resumed publication along with the Daily News on November 6, 1978, after 88 days of non-production. The newspapers reached an agreement with the unions representing the pressmen. The agreement preserved 1,500 existing jobs of the pressmen, but allowed management to reduce staffing through attrition and elimination of some overtime. Upon finally reaching agreement, both acknowledged that compromises had been made and said there had been "no victors" in the outcome. In particular, it was not a clear victory for management as had happened with the end of the 1975–1976 Washington Post pressmen's strike, a result the unions were striving to avoid in this case.

=== Impact ===
In the short term, the strike cost the newspapers an estimated $150 million in lost advertising and circulation revenue, while workers lost around $60 million in wages not earned (although union strike benefits and state unemployment insurance covered much of that for individual employees). In the longer term, the strike coincided with the advent of technological changes that initially took away the pressmen's jobs via newsroom automation and later undermined the economic model of the newspaper industry altogether.

== See also ==
- 1962–1963 New York City newspaper strike
