= The Official Politically Correct Dictionary and Handbook =

1992 book

- Author: Henry Beard, Christopher Cerf
- Language: English
- Publisher: Villard Books, Grafton, Random House of Canada
- Publication date: 1992

The Official Politically Correct Dictionary and Handbook is a book written by Henry Beard and Christopher Cerf. It was published in 1992 by Villard Books in New York, by Grafton in London, and, by Random House of Canada Limited in Toronto. An updated edition was published in 1994.

The book was translated into Japanese by Kyoko Baba. It includes a section on "bureaucratically suitable" language.

== Reception ==
The book was a bestseller. It has been described as "tongue in cheek", "outrageously funny", "hilariously rewarding", "valuable and amusing" and "thoroughly sourced".

== See also ==
- Politically Correct Bedtime Stories
- Politically Incorrect
