= Marlo Thomas =

American actress, producer, and social activist (born 1937)

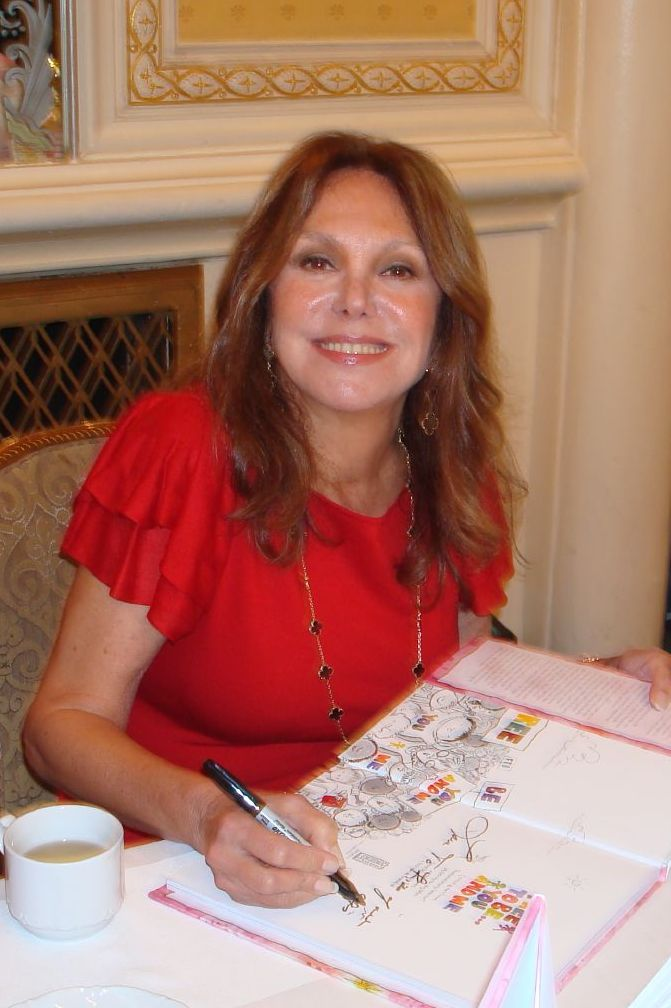
- Thomas in 2008
- Born: Margaret Julia Thomas; November 21, 1937 (age 88); Detroit, Michigan, U.S.
- Education: University of Southern California
- Occupations: Actress; producer; activist; philanthropist
- Years active: 1960–present
- Spouse: Phil Donahue (m. 1980; died 2024)
- Father: Danny Thomas
- Relatives: Tony Thomas (brother)

Margaret Julia "Marlo" Thomas (born November 21, 1937) is an American actress, producer, author, and social activist. She is best known for starring as Ann Marie in the sitcom series That Girl (1966–1971) and her children's franchise Free to Be... You and Me. She has received three Primetime Emmy Awards, a Daytime Emmy Award, a Golden Globe Award, and a Peabody Award for her work in television and was inducted into the Broadcasting and Cable Hall of Fame. She also received a Grammy Award for her children's album Marlo Thomas and Friends: Thanks & Giving All Year Long. She was married to American television host Phil Donahue from May 1980 until his death in August 2024.

In 2014, Thomas received the Presidential Medal of Freedom, given by then-President Barack Obama.

Thomas served as a National Outreach Director for St. Jude Children's Research Hospital, which was founded by her father Danny Thomas in 1962. She created the Thanks & Giving campaign in 2004 to support the hospital.

== Early life ==
Thomas was born on November 21, 1937 in Detroit, Michigan, and raised in Beverly Hills, California, the eldest child of Rose Marie Cassaniti and comedian Danny Thomas. She has a sister, Terre, and a brother, producer Tony Thomas. Her father was a Catholic Lebanese American and her mother was Sicilian American. Her godmother was Loretta Young. The name "Marlo" came from her childhood mispronunciation of the name Margo, as Thomas was called by her family.

Thomas attended Marymount High School and graduated from the University of Southern California with a teaching degree: "I wanted a piece of paper that said I was qualified to do something in the world". She was a member of the sorority Kappa Alpha Theta.

== Career ==
=== Early career ===
Thomas appeared in many television programs including Bonanza, McHale's Navy, Ben Casey, Arrest and Trial, The Joey Bishop Show, The Many Loves of Dobie Gillis, My Favorite Martian, 77 Sunset Strip, and The Donna Reed Show. Her big break came in 1965 when she was cast by Mike Nichols in the London production of Neil Simon's Barefoot in the Park, co-starring Daniel Massey, Kurt Kasznar, and Mildred Natwick. (In 1986, she was once again cast by Nichols on Broadway in Andrew Bergman's Social Security, co-starring Ron Silver and Olympia Dukakis.)

Thomas and her father, Danny, were cast as Laurie and Ed Dubro in a 1961 episode, "Honor Bright", of CBS' Dick Powell's Zane Grey Theatre.

=== That Girl ===
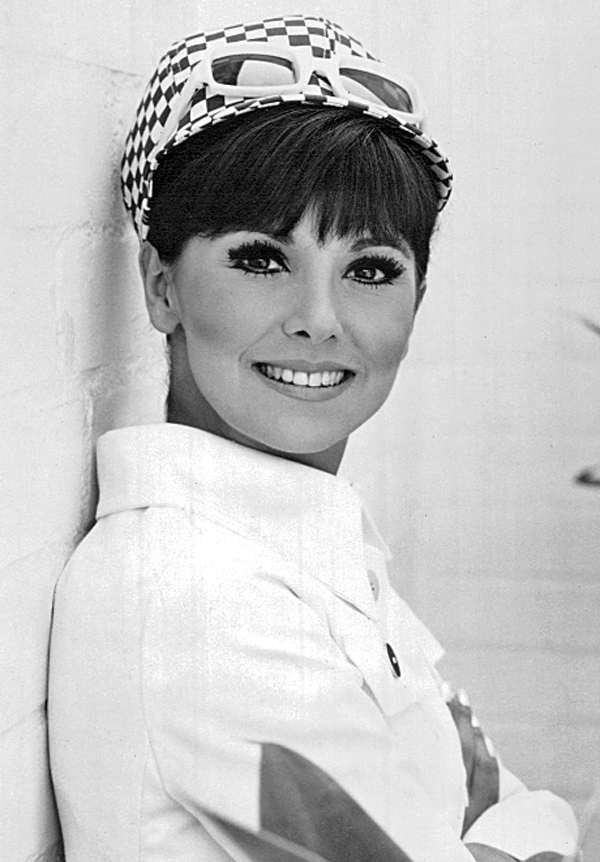
Thomas in That Girl (1968)

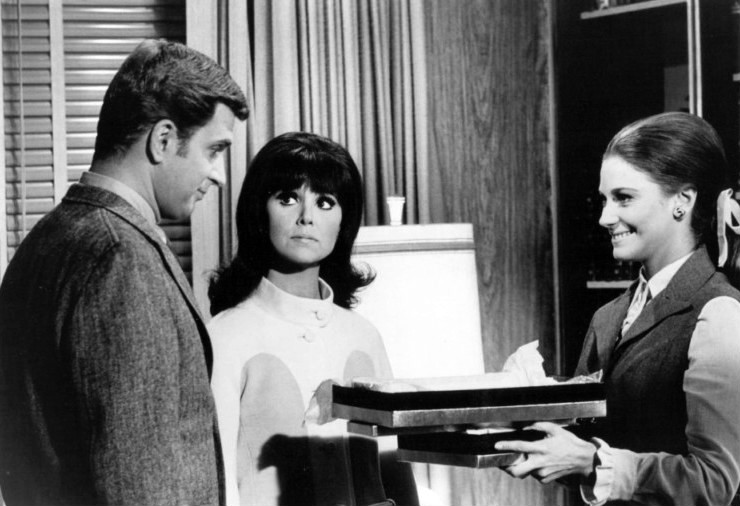
Thomas (center) with co-star Ted Bessell (left) and guest star Mary Frann (right), in a 1969 photo from That Girl

Thomas starred in an ABC pilot called Two's Company in 1965. Although it did not sell, it caught the attention of a network programming executive. He met with Thomas, and expressed interest in casting her in her own series. With their encouragement, Thomas came up with her own idea for a show about a young woman who leaves home, moves to New York City, and struggles to become an actress. The network was initially hesitant, fearing audiences would find a series centering on a single female uninteresting or unrealistic.

The concept eventually evolved into the sitcom entitled That Girl, in which Thomas played Ann Marie, a beautiful, up-and-coming actress with a writer boyfriend, played by Ted Bessell. The series told the daily struggles of Ann holding different temporary jobs while pursuing her dream of a career on Broadway. That Girl was one of the first television shows to focus on a working, single woman who did not live with her parents. Thomas was the fourth woman to produce her own series, following Gertrude Berg, Lucille Ball, and Betty White. That Girl aired from 1966 to 1971, producing 136 episodes, and was a solid performer in the Nielsen ratings.

In 1971, Thomas chose to end the series after five years. Both ABC and the show's sponsor, Clairol, wanted the series finale to be a wedding between the two central characters, but Thomas rebuffed them, saying that she felt it was the wrong message to send to her female audience, because it would give the impression that the only happy ending is marriage.

Clairol was our sponsor and they wanted to end the show with a wedding. I said, "I just can't do that to these women and girls who followed Ann Marie's adventure. I can't now say that the only happy ending is a wedding, because I don't believe it." There was a big ruckus about it, but I wouldn't do it. The last show, Ann Marie took Donald to a women's lib meeting, which made nobody happy but me. I loved it.

— Marlo Thomas, interview with Bustle

=== Later career ===
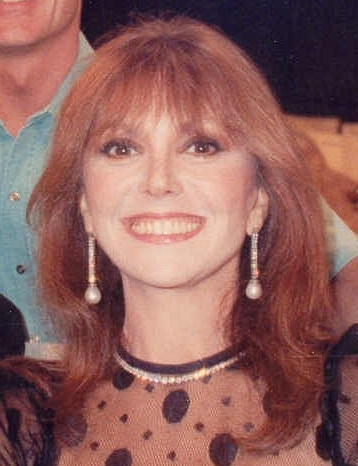
Thomas at the 41st Primetime Emmy Awards, September 17, 1989

After That Girl Thomas attended the Actors Studio, where she studied with Lee Strasberg until his death in 1982, and subsequently with his disciple Sandra Seacat. When she won her Best Dramatic Actress Emmy in 1986 for the television film Nobody's Child, she thanked both individuals.

In 1972, she released a children's book, Free to Be... You and Me, which was inspired by her young niece Dionne (née Gordon) Kirchner. She went on to create multiple recordings and television specials of and related to that title: Free to Be... You and Me (1972, 1974) and Free to Be... A Family (1987), with Christopher Cerf. Also in 1972, she served as a California delegate to the Democratic National Convention in Miami Beach, Florida. She helped the George McGovern presidential campaign in October 1972 at Star-Spangled Women for McGovern–Shriver, reciting a parody of Erich Segal's Love Story for 19,000 people at Madison Square Garden.

In 1973, Thomas joined Gloria Steinem, Patricia Carbine, and Letty Cottin Pogrebin as the founders of the Ms. Foundation for Women, the first women's fund in the US. The organization was created to deliver funding and other resources to organizations that were presenting liberal women's voices in communities nationwide.

In 1976, Thomas made a guest appearance on the NBC situation comedy The Practice as a stubborn patient of her father Danny Thomas' character Dr. Jules Bedford.

She has made guest appearances on several television series, including Law & Order: Special Victims Unit (as Judge Mary Conway Clark, a mentor of ADA Casey Novak), Ballers, The New Normal, Wet Hot American Summer: Ten Years Later. She also narrated the series Happily Never After on Investigation Discovery.

From 1996 to 2002, Thomas had a reoccurring role on the television show Friends. She played Rachel Green's mother, Sandra Green, in three episodes. Thomas's first appearance on Friends was in Season 2 when her character went looking for her daughter, who had run off to Manhattan after abandoning her fiancé, Barry, at the altar. In 2019, Thomas described her on-screen daughter, Rachel, as the "That Girl" of the late 1990s and early 2000s. Thomas compared the on-air standards 30 years apart, noting that in That Girl, Donald never spent the night at Ann's apartment, but on Friends, sex was more openly spoken about. Thomas also spoke of the great respect the Friends cast showed her when they worked together; they were familiar with her work and yielded to her comedic expertise.

Thomas appeared in films such as Jenny (1970), Thieves (1977), In The Spirit (1990), The Real Blonde (1997), Starstruck (1998), Deuce Bigalow: Male Gigolo (1999), Playing Mona Lisa (2000), LOL (2012) with Demi Moore and Miley Cyrus, and Cardboard Boxer (2014). She also starred in television films, including It Happened One Christmas (1977; also produced) (a remake of It's a Wonderful Life), The Lost Honor of Kathryn Beck (1984; also produced), Consenting Adult (1985), Nobody's Child (1986; Best Dramatic Actress Emmy), Held Hostage: The Sis and Jerry Levin Story (1991; also produced), Reunion (1994; also produced), Deceit (2004; also produced), and Ultimate Betrayal (1994). Thomas' Broadway theatre credits include Thieves (1974), Social Security (1986), and The Shadow Box (1994), and in 2011, she starred as Doreen in Elaine May's comedy George Is Dead in Relatively Speaking during a set of three one-act plays (The New York Times called Thomas' performance "sublime"). The other two plays were written by Woody Allen and Ethan Coen.

Off-Broadway, Thomas has appeared in The Guys, The Exonerated (in which she also appeared in Chicago and Boston, co-starring with Brian Dennehy), The Vagina Monologues and Love, Loss, and What I Wore. Also off-Broadway, she appeared opposite Greg Mullavey in the 2015 New York debut of Joe DiPietro's play Clever Little Lies at the Westside Theatre. Regional theatre productions include: Who's Afraid of Virginia Woolf? at the Hartford Stage; Woman In Mind at the Berkshire Theatre Festival; Paper Doll, with F. Murray Abraham at the Pittsburgh Public Theatre; and The Effect of Gamma Rays on Man-in-the-Moon Marigolds at the Cleveland Playhouse. In 1993, she toured in the national company of Six Degrees of Separation. In the spring of 2008, she starred in Arthur Laurents' last play, New Year's Eve with Keith Carradine, at the George Street Playhouse.

Thomas has published seven books Free to Be... You and Me; Free to Be... A Family; The Right Words at the Right Time; The Right Words at the Right Time, Volume 2: Your Turn; Marlo Thomas and Friends: Thanks & Giving All Year Long (the CD version of which won the 2006 Grammy Award for Best Spoken Word Album for Children); her 2009 memoir, Growing Up Laughing; and It Ain't Over...Till It's Over: Reinventing Your Life and Realizing Your Dreams Anytime, At Any Age.

Thomas serves as the National Outreach Director for St. Jude Children's Research Hospital in Memphis, Tennessee, which was founded by her father, Danny Thomas. She donated all royalties from her 2004 book and CD Marlo Thomas and Friends: Thanks & Giving All Year Long (also produced with Christopher Cerf) and her two Right Words at the Right Time books to the hospital.

In 2010, Thomas created MarloThomas.com, a website for women aged 35 and older, associated with AOL and the Huffington Post.

== Honors ==
Thomas is the recipient of four Emmy Awards, a Golden Globe Award, a Grammy Award, a Jefferson Award, and the Peabody Award.

In 1979, the Supersisters trading card set was produced and distributed; one of the cards featured Thomas' name and picture.

In 1996, she was awarded the Women in Film Lucy Award in recognition of her excellence and innovation in her creative works that have enhanced the perception of women through the medium of television.

On November 20, 2014, the Marlo Thomas Center for Global Education and Collaboration was opened as part of St. Jude Children's Research Hospital. Hillary Clinton presided over the ribbon-cutting ceremony.

On November 24, 2014, President Barack Obama awarded Thomas the Presidential Medal of Freedom, the nation's highest civilian honor, at a White House ceremony.

== Personal life ==
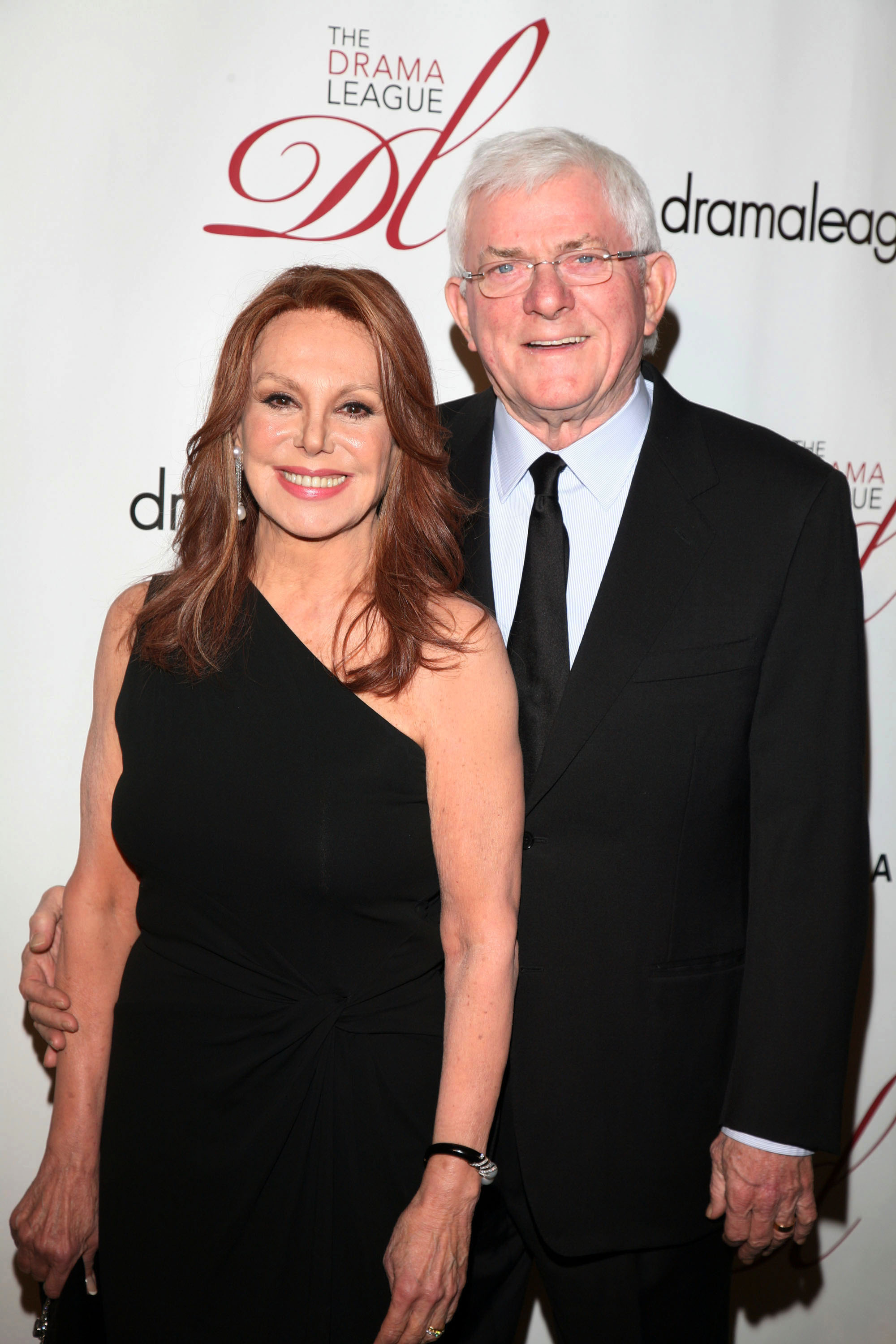
Thomas with husband Phil Donahue in 2012

Thomas was in a long relationship with playwright Herb Gardner.

In 1977, Thomas was a guest on the television talk show The Phil Donahue Show, when she and host Phil Donahue first met. According to People, "they later described the meeting as 'love at first sight.'" They were married on May 21, 1980, and Donahue moved from Chicago to New York City with some of his sons and his daughter to live with Thomas and to produce his talk show there. Thomas is the stepmother to Donahue's four sons and one daughter from his first marriage. Concerning her relationship with her stepchildren, Thomas told AARP: The Magazine in May 2011:

From the very first day, I decided that I was not going to try to be a "mother" to Phil's children in the traditional sense—they already had a mom—but, instead, to be their friend...I'm proud to say that the friendships I established with them are as strong today as they were 30 years ago—even stronger.

Donahue died of natural causes on August 18, 2024, at the age of 88.

== Filmography ==
=== Film ===
Year	Film	Role	Notes
1970	Jenny	Jenny	Nominated – Golden Globe Award for New Star of the Year – Actress
1977	Thieves	Sally Cramer	
1990	In the Spirit	Reva Prosky	
1993	Falling Down	KTLA Reporter	
1997	The Real Blonde	Blair	
1998	Starstruck	Linda Phaeffle	
1999	Deuce Bigalow: Male Gigolo	Margaret	Uncredited cameo
2000	Playing Mona Lisa	Shelia Goldstein	
2012	LOL	Gran	
2017	The Female Brain	Lynne	
2018	Ocean's 8	Rene	
2023	Bella!	Self	

=== Television ===
Year	Film	Role	Notes
1960	The Many Loves of Dobie Gillis	Frank's Girlfriend	Episode: "The Hunger Strike"
1960	77 Sunset Strip	Amina	Episode: "The Fanatics"
1961	Zane Grey Theatre	Laurie Dubro	Episode: "Honor Bright"
1961	Thriller	Susan Baker	Episode: "The Ordeal of Dr. Cordell"
1961	The Danny Thomas Show	Stella	Episode: "Everything Happens to Me" Backdoor pilot for The Joey Bishop Show
1961–1962	The Joey Bishop Show	Stella	22 episodes
1962	Insight	Jeanne Brown	Episode: "The Sophomore"
1964	Arrest and Trial	Angela Tucci	Episode: "Tigers Are for Jungles"
1964	Bonanza	Tai Lee	Episode: "A Pink Cloud Comes from Old Cathay"
1964	My Favorite Martian	Paula Clayfield	Episode: "Miss Jekyll and Hyde"
1964	Wendy and Me	Carol	Episode: "Wendy's Anniversary for —?"
1964	McHale's Navy	Cynthia Prentice	Episode: "The Missing Link"
1965	What's My Line?	Herself	Panelist
1965	The Donna Reed Show	Louise Bissell	Episode: "Guests, Guests, Who Needs Guests?"
1965	Two's Company	Caroline Sommers	Unsold pilot
1965	Ben Casey	Claire Schaeffer	Episode: "Three Li'l Lambs"
1966–1971	That Girl	Ann Marie	136 episodes Golden Globe Award for Best Actress on Television (1967); TV Land Award for Favorite Fashion Plate – Female (2004); Nominated – Primetime Emmy Award for Outstanding Lead Actress in a Comedy Series (1967-1971); Nominated – TV Land Award for Hippest Fashion Plate – Female (2003)
1967	Cricket on the Hearth	Bertha	Voice, television film
1973	The ABC Saturday Superstar Movie	Ann Marie	Voice, episode: "That Girl in Wonderland"
1973	Acts of Love and Other Comedies	Various	Television film
1976	The Practice	Judy Sinclair	Episode: "Judy Sinclair"
1977	It Happened One Christmas	Mary Bailey Hatch	Television film; also producer
1980	The Body Human: The Facts for Girls	Host	TV documentary
1984	The Lost Honor of Kathryn Beck	Kathryn Beck	Television film; also producer
1985	Consenting Adult	Tess Lynd	Television film Nominated – Golden Globe Award for Best Actress – Miniseries or Television Film
1986	Nobody's Child	Marie Balter	Television film Primetime Emmy Award for Outstanding Lead Actress in a Miniseries or a Movie; Nominated – Golden Globe Award for Best Actress – Miniseries or Television Film
1991	Held Hostage: The Sis and Jerry Levin Story	Lucille 'Sis' Levin	Television film; also producer
1994	Ultimate Betrayal	Adult Sharon Rodgers	Television film
1994	Reunion	Jessie Yates	Television film; also producer
1996	Roseanne	Tina Beige	Episode: "Satan, Darling"
1996, 2002	Friends	Sandra Green	3 episodes Nominated – Primetime Emmy Award for Outstanding Guest Actress in a Comedy Series (1996)
1999	Frasier	Sophie	Voice, 3 episodes
2000	Ally McBeal	Lynnie Bishop	2 episodes
2002	Two Against Time	Julie Portman	Television film
2004	Deceit	Ellen McCarthy	Television film; also producer
2004	Law & Order: Special Victims Unit	Judge Mary Clark	4 episodes
2007	Ugly Betty	Sandra Winthrop	Episode: "Something Wicked This Way Comes"
2012	The New Normal	Nancy Niles	Episode: "Baby Proofing"
2015	Ballers	Jason's Mother	Episode: "Ends"
2017	Wet Hot American Summer: Ten Years Later	Vivian	TV miniseries
2020	The Rocketeer	Sitti / Mrs. Abboud	Voice, 2 episodes
2022	A Magical Christmas Village	Vivian Todd	Television film (Hallmark Channel)

=== Stage ===
Year	Title	Role	Notes
1965	Barefoot in the Park	Corrie Bratter	UK Tour
1974	Thieves	Sally Cramer	Broadhurst Theatre, Broadway
1986	Social Security	Barbara Khan	Ethel Barrymore Theatre, Broadway
1990	The Effect of Gamma Rays on Man-in-the-Moon Marigolds	Beatrice Hunsdorfer	Cleveland Play House
1992	Who's Afraid of Virginia Woolf?	Martha	Hartford Stage
1993	Six Degrees of Separation	Ouisa Kittredge	US Tour
1994	The Shadow Box	Agnes	Circle in the Square Theatre, Broadway
1997	Woman in Mind	Susan	Berkshire Theatre Festival
2001	Paper Doll	Jacqueline Susann	Pittsburgh Public Theater
2002	The Guys	Joan (Replacement)	Bat Theatre Company
2002	The Exonerated	Sunny Jacobs	Bleecker Street Theatre, Off-Broadway
2009	New Year's Eve	Isabel	George Street Playhouse
2011	George is Dead	Doreen	Brooks Atkinson Theatre, Broadway
2012	Clever Little Lies	Alice	George Street Playhouse
