= Katherine Vaz =

American writer (born 1955)

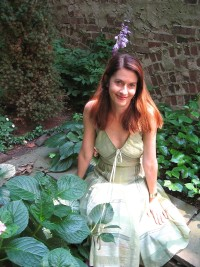
- Vaz in 2007
- Born: August 26, 1955 (age 71); Castro Valley, California, US
- Occupation: Writer
- Spouses: Christopher Cerf (m. 2015)
- Writing career
- Genres: Novels, short stories, non-fiction, children’s literature

Katherine Vaz (born August 26, 1955) is a Portuguese-American writer. A Briggs-Copeland Fellow in Fiction at Harvard University (2003–2009), a 2006–2007 Fellow of the Radcliffe Institute for Advanced Study, and the Fall 2012 Harman Fellow at Baruch College in New York, she is the author of the critically acclaimed novel Above the Salt, a People Magazine Book of the Week and a Top Book of November, a Top Three Pick by Good Morning, America.

Vaz's novel Saudade (St. Martin’s Press, 1994) is the first contemporary novel about Portuguese-Americans from a major New York publisher. It was optioned by Marlee Matlin/Solo One Productions and selected in the Barnes & Noble Discover Great New Writers series.

Her novel, Mariana, (HarperCollins, 1997), was selected by the Library of Congress as one of the Top 30 International Books of 1998 and has been translated into six languages. Mariana has been optioned for screen development with Harrison Productions.

Vaz's first short story collection Fado & Other Stories received the 1997 Drue Heinz Literature Prize and her second collection, Our Lady of the Artichokes, won the 2007 Prairie Schooner Book Prize.

Vaz is a recipient of a Literature Fellowship from the National Endowment for the Arts (1993) and the Davis Humanities Institute Fellowship (1999). She has been named by the Luso-Americano as one of the Top 50 Luso-Americanos of the twentieth century and is the first Portuguese-American to have her work recorded for the Library of Congress, housed in the Hispanic Division. The Portuguese-American Women’s Association (PAWA) named her 2003 Woman of the Year. She was appointed to the six-person U.S. Presidential Delegation to open the American Pavilion at the World’s Fair/Expo 98 in Lisbon. She lives in New York City and the Springs area of East Hampton with her husband, Christopher Cerf, whom she married in July 2015.

== Awards ==
- 1997: Drue Heinz Literature Prize, Fado & Other Stories
- 2007: Prairie Schooner Book Prize, ""

== Accolades ==
- Vaz is the first Portuguese-American writer to have work recorded for the Archives of the Library of Congress
- Named one of the top fifty Luso-Americans of the 20th century by LusoAmericano Magazine
- Named by the Portuguese Leadership Council of the U.S. as one of the All-Time Most Influential Lusa Women
- Appointed to the six-person Presidential Delegation to open the U.S. pavilion at Expo 98/World's Fair in Lisbon
- Above the Salt chosen as one of People Magazine's Best New Books to Read in Nov. 2023

== Published works ==
=== Novels ===
- Saudade (St. Martin’s Press, June 1994)
- Mariana (HarperCollins/Flamingo, 1997)
- Above the Salt (Flatiron Books, MacMillan, 2023)

=== Story collections ===
- Fado & Other Stories (University of Pittsburgh Press, 1997)
- Our Lady of the Artichokes and Other Portuguese-American Stories (University of Nebraska Press, 2008)

=== Short stories ===
- "I Can’t Keep Anything Nice in This House" (Descant, Fort Worth, TX, Fall/Winter 1986)
- "What I Did on My Christmas Vacation" (Proof Rock, Halifax, VA, Winter 1988)
- "Original Sin" (Black Ice, Belmont, MA, 1988)
- "A Little Irish Water Music" (The Sun, March 1988)
- "Sostenuto" (Kalliope, Jacksonville, FL, February 1988)
- "Fado" (TriQuarterly, Fall 1989)
- "Cartooning is Dead" (Primavera, Ann Arbor, MI, 1989)
- "Add Blue to Make White Whiter" (Other Voices, Summer/Fall 1990)
- "Red Tide" (Webster Review, Webster Groves, MO, Spring 1991)
- "Still Life" (The American Voice, Louisville, KY, 1993)
- "Scalings" (The Gettysburg Review, Spring 1995)
- "The Birth of Water Stories" (Speak, San Francisco, CA, October 1996)
- "Island Fever" (Nimrod, Tulsa, OK, Fall/Winter 1996)
- "The Lost Love Letter of a Nun" (Madame Class Magazine, Milan, Italy, August 1997)
- "Michigan Girl" (The Iowa Review, December 2000)
- "Utter" (The Malahat Review, Fall 2000)
- "The Man Who Was Made of Netting" (Tin House, January 2001)
- "My Family, Posing for Rodin" (The Antioch Review, Summer 2001)
- "Taking a Stitch in a Dead Man’s Arm" (BOMB, Winter 2001)
- "Blue Flamingo Looks At Red Water" (The Sun May, 2002)
- "The Glass-Eaters" (Glimmer Train, Fall 2002)
- "Bébé Marie Springs from the Box" (ACM (Another Chicago Magazine), Fall 2002)
- "Annette Kellermann Is My Hero" (The Alaska Quarterly Review, Spring 2003)
- "Pavane for a Dead Princess" (Kalliope, Spring 2003)
- "the rice artist" (The Iowa Review, August 2003)
- "Burning Sailor Boy" (Provincetown Arts, Summer 2003)
- "Our Lady of the Artichokes" (Pleiades, Fall 2003)
- "The Love Life of an Assistant Animator" (Glimmer Train, Fall 2003)
- "A Simple Affair" (Gargoyle Magazine, May 2004)
- "The Knife Longs for the Ruby" (Ninth Letter, Spring 2004)
- "Our Bones Here Are Waiting for Yours" (Five Points, 2004)
- "East Bay Grease" (The Antioch Review, Summer 2004)
- "One Must Speak of Sex in French" (Confrontation, Fall 2004/Winter 2005)
- "All Riptides Roar with Sand from Opposing Shores" (Notre Dame Review, Winter 2006)
- "Lisbon Story" (Harvard Review, Spring 2006)
- "What the Conch Shell Sings When the Body is Gone" (My Mother She Killed Me, My Father He Ate Me, 2010)

=== Non-fiction ===
- "Songs of the Soul, Songs of the Night," The New York Times, Sophisticated Traveler Magazine, September 18, 1994
- Signatures of Grace (Dutton, 2000). Essay on Baptism. (In conjunction with Mary Gordon, Andre Dubus, Patricia Hampl, Ron Hansen, Paula Huston, Paul Mariani).
- "Carving the Fruitstones," for anthology about short fiction, 2004, Greenwood Publications.
- "This Howling," essay on the Azores/introduction to novel by João de Melo (My World Is Not of This Kingdom, translated from Portuguese by Gregory Rabassa), Aliform Press, 2003.

=== Children's literature ===
- "The Kingdom of Melting Glances" short story in A Wolf at the Door (Simon & Schuster, 2000, in fourth printing)
- "A World Painted by Birds" in Green Man anthology (Viking, 2002)
- "My Swan Sister," title story in Swan Sister and Other Stories (Simon & Schuster, 2003)
- "Your Garnet Eyes,"in anthology Faery Reel, (Viking, 2004)
- "Chamber Music for Animals," in Coyote Road anthology (Viking, 2006)

== Critical response ==
Vaz's novel Saudade received positive reviews. According to the Library Journal, "This wonderfully inventive novel, which contains elements of magic realism, is infused with a sense of saudade-a Portuguese word that, according to the author, can be understood as an extremely intense longing for a time, place, or people... First novelist Vaz has written a challenging and rewarding work of fiction."

Her novels Mariana and Above the Salt also received positive reviews. According to Maaza Mengiste, "Katherine Vaz writes with piercing, startling beauty: every sentence suffused with longing, every moment shining with possibility. In Above the Salt she offers us a story of discovery and loss, and the fragile but unwavering bonds of love that endure, despite it all. Vaz’s Saudade is a novel that has stayed with me for decades. In this latest book, Katherine Vaz has confirmed herself as one of our best writers."
