= Not The New York Times =

Parody newspaper produced in 1978

The front page of the newspaper

Not The New York Times was a parody newspaper of The New York Times created by Christopher Cerf, George Plimpton, Freddy Plimpton, Rusty Unger, and Tony Hendra, and published during the 1978 New York City newspaper strike.

== Background ==
Due to a multi-union labor strike by pressmen that had halted production of The New York Times, the New York Daily News, and the New York Post, the Times had not been published since August 9, 1978. The strike had occurred due to the three newspapers each issuing new work rulings which significantly decreased requirements concerning the level of staffing. More than 10,000 workers had walked out during the strike. On October 5, the Post resumed publication when Rupert Murdoch, its owner and publisher, had signed an agreement with the pressmen; however, the Daily News and the Times were still not being produced.

== Production ==
Cerf's notes of ideas for the parody

In September 1978, a plan to create Not The New York Times was developed by multiple writers. The newspaper was co-created by Christopher Cerf, George Plimpton, Freddy Plimpton, Rusty Unger, and Tony Hendra. Cerf was a songwriter for Sesame Street, George Plimpton had co-founded The Paris Review, while Hendra was an editor at National Lampoon, and Unger was a columnist for The Village Voice. Unger had suggested the idea of a parody of The New York Times to Cerf, and Cerf told her that he had discussed the same project with Hendra. Cerf had admired Victor Navasky's parodies of the New York Post and the New York Daily News, and Cerf, Hendra, and Unger decided to contact writers that they knew in order to help work on the newspaper. The first person that Unger contacted was Veronica Geng, a writer for The New Yorker, who contributed to the paper. Frances FitzGerald, a writer who worked on the project, recalled that Unger would call people and ask, "We don't know what we're doing exactly, but come help us."

Cerf said that the "real fun" began when they discovered that staff who worked at the Times wanted to work on the parody as well. Steven Crist, then a copy boy at the Times who had begun trying to make a living through betting on horse racing during the strike, joined the project. Crist would later become a horse racing writer for the Times. Richard Yeend, a designer at the Times, said, "I had no food at the time. I figured this might be an opportunity to have a free meal. I learned that was exactly what this was." FitzGerald contacted Kevin Buckley, a Vietnam War correspondent for Newsweek, who joined the project as well. Glenn Collins, an editor and reporter at the Times, also participated in the parody.

Numerous other writers took part in the production of the newspaper. Carl Bernstein, a reporter known for his work on the Watergate scandal, and then-wife Nora Ephron, joined the project. Collins called the writers a "genius gang of pranksters". Other people who participated in the production included Michael Arlen, Jerzy Kosinski, and Terry Southern.

The contents of the newspaper were written by different authors. Geng authored a seven-paragraph piece written entirely in bureaucratese titled "Carter Forestalls Efforts to Defuse Discord Policy", which was printed on the front page.

== Contents ==
Not The New York Times was made up of 24 pages, and included 3 sections, 24 fake advertisements, 73 satire articles and 155 fake news briefs. The newspaper carried the slogan "All the News Not Fit to Print", as a parody of the Times' motto "All the News That's Fit to Print". The names of its sections were parodies of the Times' content as well, with "The Having Section" parodying "The Living Section", and "SprotsMonday" [sic] parodying the Times' sports section, which on Mondays was titled "SportsMonday". The weather notice included the announcement "Mostly present today, still there tomorrow".

== Release, reception, & legacy ==
The New York Times resumed publication along with the Daily News on November 6, 1978, after 88 days of non-production, a new record. The newspapers reached an agreement with the unions representing the pressmen.

Jim Romenesko of Poynter praised the newspaper as the best parody of The New York Times. Jim Dwyer stated that the parody set the modern standard for fake news, and called it a "pitch-perfect replica, spiritually and physically".

Since the release of Not The New York Times, multiple parodies of the Times and other newspapers have been created. On April 1, 1982, a parody of The Wall Street Journal titled Off The Wall Street Journal, was released, with many of the same writers from Not The New York Times also participating, including Hendra. On November 12, 2008, a spoof of the Times titled New York Times Special Edition was produced and distributed by the activist group The Yes Men. On May 5, 2011, a parody website of the Times, called "The Final Edition", was launched by Hendra, who facetiously thanked the Times for "being so ridiculously easy to parody".

The newspaper is available in Columbia University's Seymour B. Durst Collection of Historical Manuscripts in the "Documents & Newspapers, 1764–1990" section.
