= William Moylan (electrical engineer) =

American electrical engineer

- Born: William J. Moylan; June 1, 1931; Detroit, Michigan, U.S.
- Died: April 1, 2025 (aged 93); Dearborn, Michigan, U.S.
- Education: University of Detroit Engineering College
- Occupation: Electrical engineer

William J. Moylan (June 1, 1931 – April 1, 2025) was an American electrical engineer.

== Life and career ==
Moylan was raised in Detroit, Michigan, He attended Detroit Catholic Central High School, graduating in 1949. After graduating, he was drafted in the United States Army Signal Core during the Korean War, which after his discharge, he worked as a maintenance electrician at Ford Motor Company. He also attended and graduated from the University of Detroit Engineering College.

Moylan worked as an electrical engineer at the Detroit Edison Company, an investor-owned electric utility in his hometown. In 1974, he established Moylan Engineering, Inc., an engineering company. In 1998, he was named a fellow of the Institute of Electrical and Electronics Engineers, "for leadership in the development of standards for electric power distribution for industrial plants".

== Personal life and death ==
Moylan was Catholic. He was married to Andrea Ketten. Their marriage lasted until Moylan's death in 2026.

Moylan died in Dearborn, Michigan on April 1, 2025, at the age of 93.
