= Marlo Thomas and Friends: Thanks & Giving All Year Long =

Marlo Thomas & Friends: Thanks & Giving All Year Long

Compilation album by Various artists
- Released: November 16, 2004
- Genre: Children's
- Length: 64:53
- Label: Atlantic; Kid Rhino
- Producer: Christopher Cerf; Marlo Thomas

Marlo Thomas & Friends: Thanks & Giving All Year Long is an album of songs and spoken-word selections by entertainment personalities and others, and is intended as a companion to the anthology book of the same name. All proceeds are to benefit the St. Jude Children's Research Hospital. In 2006, Thanks & Giving All Year Long received the Grammy Award for Best Spoken Word Album for Children.

== Track listing ==
Track listing information adapted from Allmusic and Apple Music.

No.	Title	Writer(s)	Primary Artist	Length
1.	"All Kinds of People"	Nikki Anders; Phil Galdtson	Sheryl Crow	3:20
2.	"The Mouse, the Bird and the Sausage"	Brothers Grimm	David Hyde Pierce	2:14
3.	"I Want It!"	Laurie Berkner; Thomas	Uncle Kracker; Marlo Thomas	3:36
4.	"Teeny Meany"	David Slavin	James Earl Jones; Thomas	4:16
5.	"An Attitude of Gratitude"	Bruce Hart; Christopher Cerf	Jimmy Buffett	2:27
6.	"A Different Aladdin"	Norman Stiles	Billy Crystal	7:37
7.	"A Smile Connects Us"	Carol Hall; Robert Burke	Kermit the Frog	2:42
8.	"The Thing About Generosity"	Sarah Durkee	Thomas	0:47
9.	"Unsung Heroes"	Cerf; Stiles	Wayne Brady	2:18
10.	"Josie's First Allowance Day"	Perez	Rosie Perez	6:12
11.	"The Little Stuff"	Hall	Thomas	1:26
12.	"The Nothingest Girl in the World"	Bruce Kluger; Doug Katsaros	Sarah Jessica Parker	4:06
13.	"(I'll Give) Anything But Up!"	Duff; Charlie Midnight; Jim Marr; Marc Swersky; Durkee; Wendy Page	Hilary Duff	3:21
14.	"Point of View"	Shel Silverstein	Robin Williams	0:35
15.	"You Know My Brother (He's So Heavy)"	Kevin Bacon; Michael Bacon; Robin Batteau	The Bacon Brothers	3:34
16.	"Cheesybreadville"	Sonia Manzano	Antonio Banderas	3:40
17.	"Snow, Aldo"	Kate DiCamillo	Jennifer Aniston	1:12
18.	"Sing Me the Story of Your Day"	John Forster; Tom Chapin	Faith Hill	2:52
19.	"A Tale of Two Friends"	Joseph Bailey; Paul Jacobs	Bert and Ernie; Thomas	5:53
20.	"Thank Someone"	Durkee; Jacobs	Amy Grant; John Hiatt	2:45
Total length:				64:53
