= Andrew Bergman =

American film director and screenwriter (born 1945)

- Born: February 20, 1945 (age 81); New York City, U.S.
- Education: Binghamton University (BA); University of Wisconsin–Madison (PhD)

Andrew Bergman (born February 20, 1945) is an American screenwriter, film director, and novelist. His best-known films include Blazing Saddles, The In-Laws, The Freshman and Striptease.

== Early life ==
Born to a Jewish family, Bergman graduated from Binghamton University in 1965 and earned a PhD in American history from the University of Wisconsin–Madison in 1970.

His dissertation, a study of Depression-era Hollywood films, was published in 1971 by NYU Press under the title We're in the Money: Depression America and Its Films. He also wrote James Cagney: The Pictorial Treasury of Film Stars.

== Career ==
=== Screenwriting ===
Bergman broke into the film industry by writing the original screenplay (titled Tex X) that served as the basis for Mel Brooks's classic Blazing Saddles (1974), and was among the writers who adapted it into its final state. He was later the sole creator of the TV sitcom pilot adaptation called "Black Bart" starring Louis Gossett Jr. for CBS which aired only once on April 4, 1975. The production was only a contractual requirement by Warner Bros. in order to maintain movie rights to produce future sequels. Mel Brooks did not have any involvement.

He wrote a gangster film Rhapsody in Crime that was never made. Warner Bros approached him to write a sequel to Freebie and the Bean with Peter Falk and Alan Arkin. Instead, Bergman came up with The In-Laws (1979).

=== Director ===
The In-Laws was a success, so Bergman could direct his next script, So Fine (1981) starring Ryan O'Neal. It was a box office disappointment.

Bergman wrote Oh, God! You Devil (1984) and Fletch (1985) starring Chevy Chase. The latter was a big hit. Less successful was Big Trouble (1986), the final film to be directed by John Cassavetes. In 1987, The Lobell/Bergman Company, which was a joint venture with producer Michael Lobell, had signed a first-look deal at Universal Pictures to handle film production of various movies.

New York magazine in 1985 dubbed him "The Unknown King of Comedy."

He wrote and directed The Freshman (1990) starring Marlon Brando and Matthew Broderick and did a rewrite on Soapdish (1991). He executive produced a number of movies including Chances Are (1989), White Fang (1991), Undercover Blues (1993) and Little Big League (1994).

Bergman wrote and directed Honeymoon in Vegas (1992) starring Nicolas Cage, James Caan and Sarah Jessica Parker, and directed It Could Happen To You (1994) starring Nicolas Cage and Bridget Fonda.

He wrote the initial draft for The Scout (1994), although he says the resulting film is different from his version. The film gives writing credit to Roger Angell, Bergman, Monica Johnson and star Albert Brooks.

Bergman wrote and directed Striptease (1996) starring Demi Moore, and directed the Jacqueline Susann biopic Isn't She Great (2000) starring Bette Midler and Nathan Lane.

He has written four novels: The Big Kiss-Off of 1944, Hollywood and LeVine, Tender Is LeVine, and Sleepless Nights. The first three are hard-boiled noir detective stories about a Jewish private eye called Jack LeVine (originally Jacob Levine) in 1940s New York. The fourth is a psychological study of a Jewish family. He also wrote the Broadway comedy, Social Security, and Working Title.

The Andrew Bergman History Writing Prize is awarded by the University of Wisconsin.

=== Theatre ===
His first play on Broadway, Social Security, opened in 1986, starring Marlo Thomas and Ron Silver.

In 2013, Bergman would go on to adapt his movie and write the book for the Honeymoon in Vegas Broadway musical, with music and lyrics by Jason Robert Brown.

== Awards ==
In 2007, Bergman received the Ian McLellan Hunter Award for Lifetime Achievement in Writing from the Writers Guild of America.

For his work on Striptease, Bergman received the Golden Raspberry Awards for Worst Director, Worst Screenplay, and shared the Worst Picture Award with co-producer Mike Lobell.

== Personal life ==
He lives in New York City with his wife. He has two grown sons.

== Filmography ==
Film

Year	Title	Director	Writer	Notes
1974	Blazing Saddles	No	Yes	
1979	The In-Laws	No	Yes	
1981	So Fine	Yes	Yes	
1984	Oh, God! You Devil	No	Yes	
1985	Fletch	No	Yes	
1986	Big Trouble	No	Yes	Credited as "Warren Bogle"
1990	The Freshman	Yes	Yes	
1991	Soapdish	No	Yes	
1992	Honeymoon in Vegas	Yes	Yes	
1994	It Could Happen to You	Yes	No	
1994	The Scout	No	Yes	
1996	Striptease	Yes	Yes	Also producer
2000	Isn't She Great	Yes	No	
2022	Paws of Fury: The Legend of Hank	No	Yes	

Executive producer

- Chances Are (1989)
- White Fang (1991)
- Undercover Blues (1993)
- Little Big League (1994)

Television

Year	Title	Writer	Producer	Notes
1975	Black Bart	Yes	No	Unaired pilot
1987	CBS Summer Playhouse	Yes	Executive	Episode "Mickey and Nora"
1988	The Dictator	No	Yes	Episode "Reading, Writing and Rebellion"
