= Paige Peterson =

American artist and author

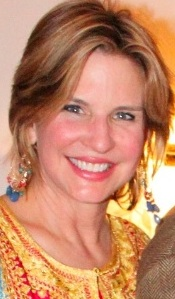
- Paige Peterson
- Born: Paige Matthews; March 19, 1955 (age 71); Belvedere, California, U.S.
- Spouse: David Peterson (divorced) (2 children)

Paige Matthews Peterson (born March 19, 1955, in Marin County, California) is an American artist, author and photojournalist who has written extensively about the Middle East. She is the former executive vice president to the Huntsman Cancer Foundation. She is the daughter-in-law of billionaire and former US Secretary of Commerce Peter George Peterson. She now lives and works in New York City, California and East Hampton, Long Island. Paige Peterson is a contributing writer and photojournalist for Marin Magazine, New York Social Diary and the National Council on U.S.-Arab Relations.

In 2006, she co-authored with Christopher Cerf and illustrated the best-selling children's book Blackie, The Horse Who Stood Still, published by Rizzoli. Peterson also illustrated Charles Dickens A Christmas Carol, and Black Beauty, both edited by Jesse Kornbluth. Peterson facilitated the editing, publishing and production of Jon M. Huntsman's book Barefoot to Billionaire: Reflections on a Life's Work and a Promise to Cure Cancer. She was the Vice President of Special Projects for Welcome Books, where she had an imprint, Cerf & Peterson.

In July 2008 Peterson's paintings were featured in a one-woman show at the Spanierman Gallery in East Hampton, New York. In March 2011 she had a show at the Gerald Peters Gallery in New York City. The show was curated by Peter Marcelle. In 2002, Paige Peterson was featured in Studios by the Sea, a photographic account, by Bob Colacello and Jonathan Becker, of artists working and living on Long Island's East End, and, a year later, she was selected for lifetime membership in the Guild Hall Academy of the Arts. As a painter and illustrator specializing in acrylic landscapes, portraits and figural images, Peterson's work has been characterized as "lyrical" by the Philadelphia Inquirer and "spare but evocative" by the San Francisco Chronicle. Peterson has been exhibited regularly in galleries from California to Maine (where, in 2004, her paintings appeared in a group show that also featured works by Christo, Chuck Close, and Alex Katz).

Peterson sits on the board of directors of the National Council on U.S.-Arab Relations. She is the Director of Marketing at Hadley General Contractors. She is an Author and Artist in Residency at Literacy Partners. She is the Chief Consultant for Growth and Development at the Attitudinal Healing International organization. Peterson served as the executive vice president with the Ben Barnes Group. In 2015, she was an artist and author in residence at Dhahran Ahiliyya Schools in the Eastern Province of Saudi Arabia. Peterson appeared on the podcast The Pathway to Peak Performance in August 2025.
