= John Boswell (publishing-business figure) =

American literary agent

John Boswell (born 1945) is a book packager, literary agent, and author in New York City.

He was the subject of a New York Times article on book packaging, which described it as coming up with the idea for a book, writing a proposal, and finding a writer.

Two books he co-wrote, French for Cats (1992, with Henry Beard) and O.J.'s Legal Pad (1995, with Henry Beard and Ron Barrett), have reached the New York Times Best Seller list. On some book jackets, he also takes credit for co-writing the number-1 bestseller What They Don't Teach You at Harvard Business School, although the only listed author is Mark H. McCormack.

Boswell was also a producer of Leslie Nielsen's Stupid Little Golf Video and appears in it as an "unsuspecting golfer".
