= Politically Correct Bedtime Stories =

1994 book by James Finn Garner

- First edition cover
- Author: James Finn Garner
- Publisher: Macmillan Publishing
- Publication date: 1994
- ISBN: 978-0-02-542730-3

Politically Correct Bedtime Stories: Modern Tales for Our Life and Times is a 1994 book written by American writer James Finn Garner, in which Garner satirizes the trend toward political correctness and censorship of children's literature, with an emphasis on humour and parody. The bulk of the book consists of fairy tales such as Little Red Riding Hood, the Three Little Pigs and Snow White, rewritten so that they represent what a politically correct adult would consider a good and moral tale for children.

The revisions include extensive usage of politically correct buzzwords (and parodies thereof), deliberately stiff moralizing dialogue and narration, inclusion of modern concepts and objects (such as health spas, mineral water, and automobiles), and often feature a plot twist that reverses the roles of the heroes and villains of the story (for example, the woodsman in Little Red Riding Hood is seen by Red Riding Hood not as a heroic saviour but as a "sexist" and "speciesist" interloper, and Snow White's evil stepmother ends up with a positive portrayal while the prince and the seven dwarves are portrayed as chauvinistic).

Politically Correct Bedtime Stories was Garner's first published book (or, in the words of his similarly satirical biography blurb from the book, "his first processed tree carcass"). More than 2.5 million copies have been sold in the United States and it has since been translated into 20 languages. Garner wrote two follow-up books: Once upon a More Enlightened Time: More Politically Correct Bedtime Stories and Politically Correct Holiday Stories: For an Enlightened Yuletide Season, the latter book satirizing political correctness during the Christmas holiday season. In 1998, the three books were compiled into an omnibus collection called Politically Correct: The Ultimate Storybook. All editions of the Politically Correct titles are currently out of print.

In 2018, Garner released "Politically Correct Pinocchio".

== Stories ==
The following is a listing of the stories in the order they appear in the book.

=== Little Red Riding Hood ===
Based on the popular fairy tale of the same name, this parody includes as its main themes mocking the idea of anti-"speciesism" and the more radical branches and concepts of feminism (such as using the spelling "womyn" instead of "women" throughout, a pattern that is repeated in other stories in the book), and is one of the several stories in which the ending is completely altered from the original fairy tale.

The woodsman (who saves Little Red Riding Hood and her grandmother in the most well-known versions of the tale) ends up beheaded by the grandmother, who leaps from the wolf's mouth of her own accord after a "stirring" moralizing speech from Red, who states that womyn and wolves can solve their own problems without a man's interference. This comes after, of course, Red Riding Hood has labeled him as "sexist" and "speciesist" for deciding to try to save Red Riding Hood by killing the wolf. The wolf, Red Riding Hood, and her grandmother then form an "alternative household" together.

=== The Emperor's New Clothes ===
This is a parody of the eponymous fairy tale. The well-known ending is not entirely changed, but the outcome of it and moral of the story nonetheless do.

The story ends with a pro-nudist twist, with the whole kingdom quickly deciding to adopt a clothing optional society.

=== The Three Little Pigs ===
A parody of the fairy tale of the same name, in it the wolves are greedy capitalists and the pigs are natives forced off their land who later become freedom fighters or "porcinistas", parodying the Nicaraguan party Sandinista National Liberation Front, or Sandinism. The Big Bad Wolf succumbs to a heart attack.

The "porcinistas" slaughter the wolves, take back their lands and found a utopian socialist democracy in its place, living happily ever after.

=== Rumpelstiltskin ===
A parody of the classic Rumpelstiltskin story.

Instead of turning the straw into gold by magic, the girl (Esmeralda) and Rumpelstiltskin take the straw to poor farmers, who use it to thatch their roofs; in better health, the farmers become more productive, which improves the local economy and eventually leads to the overthrow of the prince and Esmeralda's being rewarded with gold. Esmeralda is then able to thwart Rumpelstiltskin's plan to take her first-born child by guessing his name; however, unlike in the original tale, she only guesses it because his "Little People's Empowerment Seminar" nametag is still on his body. Angry at the idea that her reproductive rights were almost taken away from her, she moves to California and starts a birth control clinic and lives happily ever after—as a "fulfilled, dedicated single person."

=== The Three Codependent Goats Gruff ===
This is a parody of the Billy Goats Gruff folktale, which satirizes "the masochistic tendencies of modern American liberal morality". The three Billy Goats and the Troll all attempt to take the blame for the situation and end up in a mass brawl which results in them falling off the bridge.

=== Rapunzel ===
A parody of the Rapunzel fairy tale, with a completely different ending.

It features the twist of the prince having connections in the music recording industry; having heard her sing, he wants to make her a star—and profit heavily from merchandising both her voice and her appearance. He soon convinces the witch that she should agree to the deal and stay on as her manager. However, Rapunzel, disgusted by the idea of her voice being exploited for capitalist gain, climbs out of the tower and runs off to become a folk musician who performs for free in a "coffee house".

=== Cinderella ===
A parody of the Cinderella fairy tale, with a distinctly feminist and anti-lookist twist. The ending is completely different from the original fairy tale.

Cinderella's "Fairy Godperson" (who is male) reluctantly agrees to dress her up for the ball. However, she is so attractive in her impractical shoes, clothing and makeup, that every male in the ballroom goes mad for her and a brawl begins that eventually results in the death of every last one of them. The women, envious of Cinderella's ability to make men go mad because of her beauty, at first turn on her; however, the clock strikes 12:00 midnight and she is transformed back to her peasant garb—and is so happy to be in comfortable clothes again that the other women decide that they are now envious of her comfort. Instead of killing her, however, they remove their own corsets, dresses and impractical shoes and dance around in their "shifts and bare feet". Covering up the real reason behind the men's deaths, they take over the kingdom and open a clothing company that produces only comfortable and practical clothing for women.

=== Goldilocks ===
A parody of the original Goldilocks and the Three Bears fairy tale, Goldilocks is not a little girl, but rather a greedy rogue biologist bent on tracking and studying the peaceful anthropomorphic bears to make a splash in the scientific community.

Goldilocks attempts to put tranquilizers in the bears' porridge and traps with radio collars in their beds. However, the bears note the "chemical" smell of their organic porridge and, suspicious, discover the traps as well as Goldilocks, who has fallen asleep in the corner of the room while waiting for her targets to return. The Papa Bear and Mama Bear then brutally kill and consume Goldilocks while the shocked Baby Bear looks on; it is revealed that the family is vegetarian, though the parents made an exception this time.

=== Snow White ===
This parody is based on the classic Snow White fairy tale, with numerous satirical twists (for example, the Seven Dwarfs, who are referred to as "vertically challenged men", run a retreat for men wanting to indulge in "primal" behavior) and a completely different ending. It has similar themes to the Cinderella parody from earlier in the book.

As in the original story, the queen pretends to be an old woman selling apples which, in truth, are poisoned. However, during the course of conversation with Snow White, she bonds with her. Forgetting that the apple in question was poisoned, she shares it with Snow White and both fall comatose to the floor.

Meanwhile, the dwarfs return—with the prince. The prince is at the retreat to try and cure his impotence, and, attracted to the nubile coma victim, requests to have sex with her; at which point the dwarfs decide that the unconscious Snow White makes a perfect impotence treatment and decide to display her so that they can make more money. However, when they try to move the two women's bodies, the poisoned apple pieces become dislodged from their throats - as in the original story; the women awaken, angry and disgusted at what they overheard while comatose and unable to act. The queen then declares that the dwarfs are trespassers, and throws them out of her forest. She and Snow White later open a spa for women on the same spot.

=== Chicken Little ===
A parody of the popular folktale of the same name, this story largely satirizes frivolous lawsuits. Chicken Little, Henny Penny and Goosey Loosey attempt to sue for various matters, and end up getting involved in a court battle lasting till this day.

=== The Frog Prince ===
A parody of the Frog Prince fairy tale. The Frog Prince in here is rather a land developer who cheated several landlords out of their property and was consequently punished by being turned into a frog. Once turned back into a human, the developer attempts to get the princess to help him in his greedy schemes to develop more land, which ends in her killing him.

=== Jack and the Beanstalk ===
A parody of the fairy tale of the same name. Jack attempts to steal the magic harp and eggs, but is trapped by the giant who reveals that he has uprooted the beanstalk, and invites Jack to join the cloud community, made up of people who have become trapped in a similar fashion.

== Other satirical content in the book ==
The writer and publishers – not content to merely let the stories themselves be the only satire in the book – also featured satirical content in the book jacket author's biography blurb, the description of the book itself ("[...] the stories were sexist, discriminatory, unfair, culturally biased, and in general, demeaning to witches, animals, goblins, and fairies everywhere. [...] We'd like to think that future generations of fairy tale fans will see this as a worthy attempt to develop meaningful literature that is totally free of bias and purged from the influences of the flawed cultural past."), as well, of course, as in the introduction which goes so far as to include the following breathless passage:

If, through omission or commission, I have inadvertently displayed any sexist, racist, culturalist, nationalist, regionalist, ageist, lookist, ableist, sizeist, speciesist, intellectualist, socioeconomicist, ethnocentrist, phallocentrist, heteropatriarchalist, or other type of bias as yet unnamed, I apologize...

== Writing style, common themes and recurring elements ==
The book features many recurring themes and elements throughout the story. One recurring element is the alternate spellings of "wommon" and "womyn" (instead of "woman" and "women"). Additionally, the inclusion of distinctly modern concepts (such as Goldilocks being a rogue biologist, or Red Riding Hood bringing her grandmother mineral water) is common throughout the book, in keeping with the concept of "updating" classic fairy tales for modern times. Another common element is that many of the previous heroes or villains have had a role reversal, with female villains usually becoming more enlightened or empowered and befriending the heroine. Female characters (with few exceptions) rescue themselves after being similarly empowered and enlightened.

The protagonist of each story purportedly conforms to the above-mentioned ideologies to absurd, obsessive levels. The satirical style used throughout the book, from the introduction to every one of the stories and then some, is that of an overly cautious, excessively verbose author who so fears offending or maligning any one reader that he is continually sidetracked and preoccupied by using politically correct (or pseudo-politically correct) terminology and phrasing, to the point of ridiculousness and redundancy. However, the book is absent of polemics—its stories are styled only upon a deadpan context of removing of all traditional bias, stereotype and prejudice from well-known fiction, under the pretense of not warping young minds.

== See also ==
- Campaign Against Political Correctness
- The Official Politically Correct Dictionary and Handbook
- Politically Incorrect

== Relevant literature ==
- Castelló Logroño, Marta Salomé, and Ramón Plo Alastrué. The Translation of Euphemism: A Comparative Analysis between the Mexican and Peninsular Spanish Translations of Politically Correct Bedtime Stories (1994) by James F. Garner. Universidad Zaragoza.
- Dağabak, Ezgi Su. Reconstruction of ideal female image in fairy tales through translation strategies: The case of politically correct bedtime stories. Master's thesis, Sosyal Bilimler Enstitüsü, 2018.
- Gring-Pemble, Lisa, and Martha Solomon Watson. "The rhetorical limits of satire: An analysis of James Finn Garner's politically correct bedtime stories." Quarterly Journal of Speech 89, no. 2 (2003): 132-153.
- Kinsler, Jeffrey S. “Politically Incorrect.” SMU Law Review Vol 48.2:411-426. 1995.
- Małek, Martyna. A Pragmatic Analysis of Politeness Strategies in James Finn Garner's Politically Correct Bedtime Stories (1994). (2020).
- Vlašković Ilić, Biljana. "The Liberation of Fairy-Tale Heroines in James Finn Garner’s Politically Correct Bedtime Stories." Fabula 63, no. 1-2 (2022): 180-194.
