= James Finn Garner =

American writer and satirist (born 1960)

James Finn Garner (born 1960) is an American writer and satirist based in Chicago. He is the author of Politically Correct Bedtime Stories, Politically Correct Holiday Stories, Apocalypse Wow, Once Upon a More Enlightened Time, and Recut Madness.
