= Christopher Cerf (producer) =

American musician, actor and writer

- Born: August 19, 1941 (age 85)
- Education: Harvard University
- Occupations: Author; Composer; Lyricist; Voice actor; Record and television producer
- Spouses: Geneviève Charbin (m. 1972, divorced) Katherine Vaz (m. 2015)
- Parents: Bennett Cerf (father); Phyllis Fraser (mother)

Christopher Cerf (born August 19, 1941) is an American writer, composer-lyricist, voice actor, and record and television producer. He has contributed music to Sesame Street, and co-created and co-produced the PBS literacy education television program Between the Lions.

== Biography ==
Cerf's father was Random House co-founder, publisher, editor and TV panelist Bennett Cerf. His mother was journalist and children's book publisher Phyllis Fraser. Cerf attended the Deerfield Academy and graduated from Harvard College. He was married to Geneviève Charbin who is a Catholic of French descent. Cerf and Katherine Vaz were married on June 21, 2015. After his father's death, his mother married ex-New York City mayor Robert F. Wagner Jr.

== Musical compositions ==
In the early 1960s, he was involved as a writer and performer on musical satires released by The Harvard Lampoon. Since its first season in 1969, Cerf has played a role in the creation and production of the Sesame Street television program, most notably as a regular contributor of music and lyrics, and as the producer of many of its music albums. In the process, he has won two Grammy Awards and three Emmy Awards for songwriting and music production. Since writing and performing his first song for Sesame Street, "Count It Higher" (1973) in Season 5, Cerf has written or co-written over 200 songs featured on the program, including "Put Down the Duckie", "The Word Is No", "Dance Myself to Sleep", "Monster in the Mirror", and such parody songs as "Born To Add", "Letter B", "Wet Paint", and "Furry Happy Monsters". Cerf also played a role in the ongoing funding of Sesame Street, founding and serving as the original editor-in-chief of Sesame Workshop's books, records, and toys division.

In addition to his contributions to Sesame Street, Cerf's musical material has appeared on Saturday Night Live, The National Lampoon Radio Hour, The Electric Company, Square One Television, Between the Lions, and in numerous Muppet productions, and his songs have been performed by Paul Simon, En Vogue, John Candy, Joe Williams, Cheech Marin, Keb' Mo', Kevin Kline, Phoebe Cates, Lily Tomlin, Shari Lewis's Lamb Chop, Andrea Martin, Goo Goo Dolls, Mary Chapin Carpenter, Rick Moranis, Take 6, Waylon Jennings, Harry Belafonte, Jeff Redd, Chris Barron, Ray Charles, Johnny Cash, R.E.M., James Taylor, Tony Bennett, Dixie Chicks, Tracy Chapman, Carol Channing, Randy Travis, The Four Tops, Melissa Etheridge, Smokey Robinson, Bonnie Raitt, Wynton Marsalis, Little Richard, B.B. King, Jimmy Buffett, Bart Simpson, and the Metropolitan Opera's José Carreras. The blond, curly-haired Muppet character from Sesame Street is his namesake and the lead singer of the rock group "Chrissy and the Alphabeats."

== 1963–70: Cerf at Random House ==
Before joining Sesame Street, Cerf spent eight years as a senior editor at Random House (co-founded by his father in 1927), where he worked with authors George Plimpton, Andy Warhol, Abbie Hoffman, Ray Bradbury, Richard Fariña, and Dr. Seuss (Theodor Geisel). In 1993, Cerf renewed his ties to Random House when he assumed the role of Chairman of the Modern Library's Board of Advisors.

== Collaborations with Marlo Thomas ==
Cerf edited and produced the Marlo Thomas & Friends' Free to Be... a Family book, album and TV special. The book reached No. 1 on The New York Times bestseller list within a week of its publication in 1989, and the show received a prime-time Emmy as the year's outstanding children's special.

Cerf and Thomas collaborated again, co-editing and co-producing Thanks & Giving: All Year Long, a book and CD about generosity and sharing (and their polar opposites, selfishness and thoughtlessness). Royalties from the project, for which Thomas and Cerf won a 2005 Grammy Award, go to St. Jude Children's Research Hospital, founded by Thomas' father, Danny Thomas, in 1962.

== Between the Lions ==
Cerf served as Executive Producer, and Music and Audio Producer, of Between the Lions, the children's literacy series that his company, Sirius Thinking, Ltd., created for PBS. Between the Lions has twice won the Television Critics' Award as the nation's outstanding children's television program, and won ten Emmy Awards. In two independent studies, conducted by the University of Kansas and Mississippi State University, the program has also demonstrated success in helping children – including those at the highest risk of literacy failure – to learn how to read.

== Lomax, the Hound of Music ==
In 2008, Cerf served as co-creator (with Norman Stiles and Louise Gikow), Executive producer and writer of the PBS Kids series Lomax, the Hound of Music. The show, which debuted in the winter of 2008, is a children's series featuring "a good-natured, melody-obsessed puppet pooch named Lomax, his fluffy feline sidekick Delta, and their human companion, Amy, on a tune-filled train ride crisscrossing the musical landscape of America. With the help – and full participation – of real kids on the train, on location, and the viewers at home, Lomax and his friends doggedly pursue their mutual passion: tracking down the wonderful songs that form the heart of our nation's diverse musical heritage."

The show had educational credentials. Aware that many American children do not receive any formal musical education, Cerf, Stiles and Gikow based Lomax on the music education curriculum created by the music educator John Feierabend, PhD, proven to increase children's musical ability and intelligence. It included appearances by Larry Campbell and Tom Chapin. Lomax ran for only one season.

== Humorous writings ==
Cerf also worked as an author and satirist. In 1970, he helped launch the National Lampoon, serving as a Contributing Editor from its first issue until the mid-1970s, and in 1978, he co-conceived and co-edited with Tony Hendra, George Plimpton and Rusty Unger the journalistic parody Not The New York Times.

The Experts Speak, the "compendium of authoritative misinformation" that Cerf co-authored with Victor Navasky in 1984, has recently been reissued. In 1986, Cerf collaborated with National Lampoon colleague Henry Beard on The Pentagon Catalog: Ordinary Products at Extraordinary Prices, which offered readers the historic opportunity to obtain a free hex nut—valued at $2,043 by the McDonnell Douglas Corporation—with every copy they purchased. (The book has a die-cut hole in its front cover and first few pages: the book was sold in clear plastic shrink wrap with a steel hex nut inside this hole, slightly less than flush with the cover. The shrink wrap displayed the hex nut and prevented it from falling out before the book was purchased.) The Official Politically Correct Dictionary, also written with Beard, first appeared in 1992.

In 2008, to commemorate the fifth anniversary of George W. Bush's victory speech aboard the U. S. S. Lincoln, Cerf again collaborated with Victor Navasky to produce Mission Accomplished!: Or How We Won the War in Iraq based on America's military presence in Iraq.

== Objections to the use of his music to break captives' will ==
In December 2008, the Associated Press reported that various musicians were coordinating their objections to the use of their music as a technique for softening up captives. The songs used were primarily heavy metal, but included songs from Sesame Street. The Associated Press reported that Cerf "was horrified to learn songs from the children's TV show were used in interrogations". As a consequence, he researched how music is being used for military purposes and published his findings in the documentary movie Songs of War.

== Selected bibliography ==
- Alligator, with Michael K. Frith as by "I*N FL*M*NG" (Harvard Lampoon parody of Ian Fleming's James Bond novels), 1962
- The Vintage Anthology of Science Fantasy (editor), 1966
- The World's Largest Cheese, 1968
- The Chicago Conspiracy Trial: The Chicago Conspiracy vs. The Washington Kangaroos / Official Pogrom (editor, with Michael Frith), New York: Domesday Books, 1969
- Official National Lampoon Bicentennial Calendar 1976 (with Bill Effros), 1975
- Not The New York Times (co-editor, with Larry Durocher, Josh Feigenbaum, Tony Hendra, George Plimpton, and Rusty Unger), 1978
- The 80s: A Look Back at the Tumultuous Decade 1980–1989 (co-editor, with Tony Hendra and Peter Elbling), 1979 (ISBN 0-89480-122-8, ISBN 0-89480-119-8 [paperback])
- The Experts Speak: The Definitive Compendium of Authoritative Misinformation (with Victor Navasky), 1984 (ISBN 0-394-71334-6 [paperback], ISBN 0-394-52061-0 [hardcover]), 1990, 1998 (ISBN 0-679-77806-3)
- The Pentagon Catalog: Ordinary Products at Extraordinary Prices (with Henry Beard), 1986 (ISBN 0-89480-036-1)
- Marlo Thomas & Friends: Free to Be... a Family (co-editor, with Marlo Thomas), 1987
- The Book of Sequels (with Henry Beard, Sarah Durkee, and Sean Kelly), 1990
- Small Fires: Letters From the Soviet People to Ogonyok Magazine, 1987–1990 (co-editor, with Marina Albee), 1990 (ISBN 0-671-69397-2, ISBN 0-671-72876-8 [paperback])
- The Gulf War Reader: History, Documents, Opinions (co-editor, with Micah L. Sifry), 1991 (ISBN 0-8129-1947-5)
- The Official Politically Correct Dictionary and Handbook (with Henry Beard), 1992 (ISBN 0-679-74113-5), 1993
- The Official Sexually Correct Dictionary and Handbook (with Henry Beard), 1995 (ISBN 0-679-75641-8)
- The Iraq War Reader: History, Documents, Opinions (co-editor, with Micah L. Sifry), 2003 (ISBN 0-7432-5347-7)
- Marlo Thomas & Friends: Thanks and Giving: All Year Long (co-editor, with Marlo Thomas), 2004 (ISBN 0-689-87732-3)
- Blackie: The Horse Who Stood Still (with Paige Peterson (artist)), 2006 (ISBN 1-59962-017-0)
- Mission Accomplished! (or How We Won the War in Iraq), (with Victor S. Navasky), 2008 (ISBN 1-4165-6993-6)
- Spinglish: The Definitive Dictionary of Deliberately Deceptive Language (with Henry Beard), 2015 (ISBN 0-3991-7239-4)
- A Skunk in My Bunk!, 2019 (ISBN 0-525-57872-2)
