= Isaac Darkangelo =

American football player (born 2000)

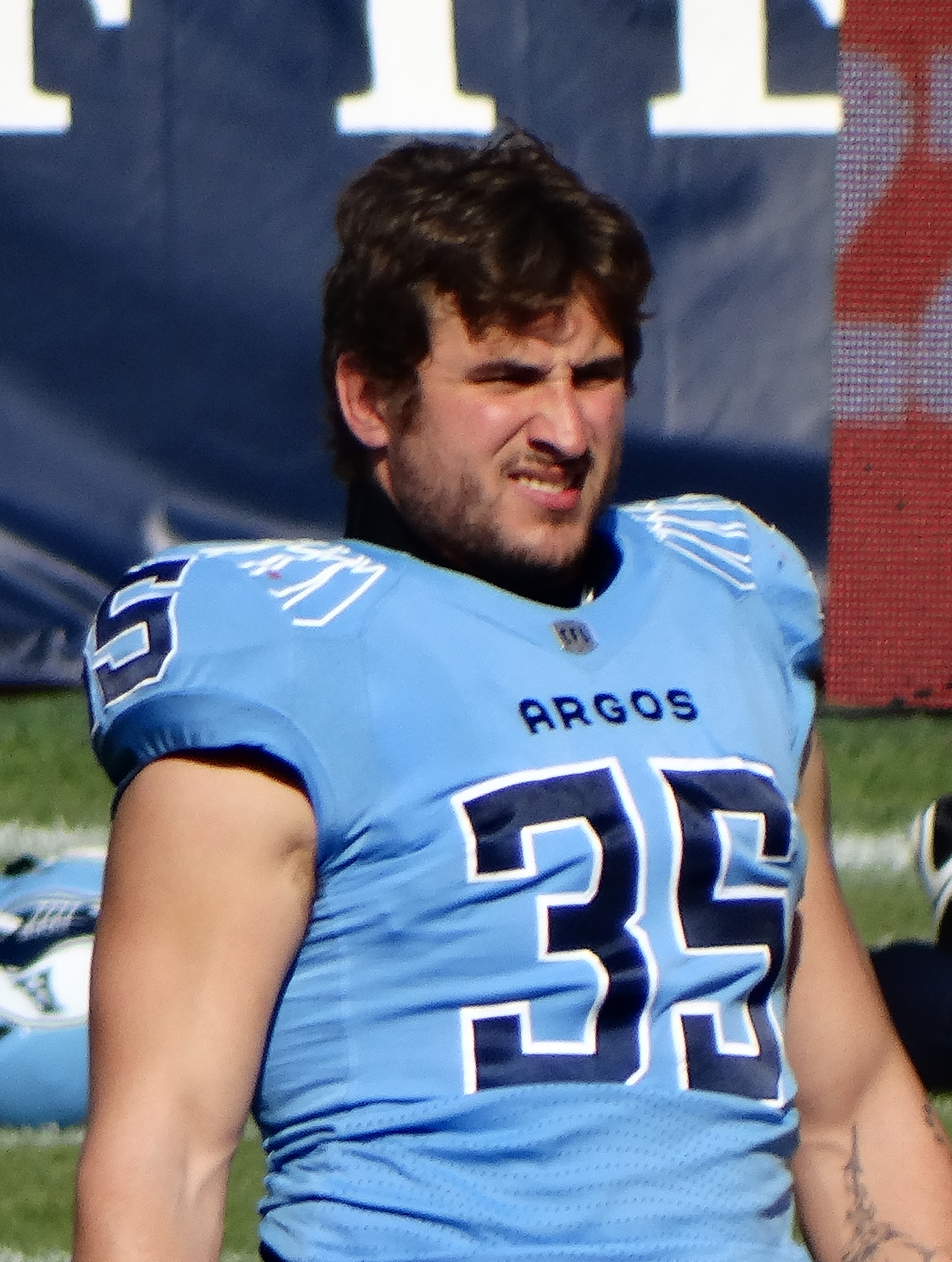
- Darkangelo with the Toronto Argonauts in 2024

No. 35 – Toronto Argonauts
- Position: Linebacker
- Roster status: Active
- CFL status: American

Personal information
- Born: April 26, 2000 (age 26); Brighton, Michigan, U.S.
- Listed height: 6 ft 1 in (1.85 m)
- Listed weight: 230 lb (104 kg)

Career information
- High school: Detroit Catholic Central (MI)
- College: Northern Michigan (2018–2019); Illinois (2020–2022)

Career history
- 2023: Detroit Lions*
- 2023: Las Vegas Raiders*
- 2024: Michigan Panthers*
- 2024–present: Toronto Argonauts
- * Offseason or practice squad member only

Awards and highlights
- Grey Cup champion (2024); CFL East All-Star (2026); Second-team All-GLIAC (2019)

Career CFL statistics as of Week 16, 2026
- Games played: 40
- Defensive tackles: 181
- Spec. team tackles: 33
- Sacks: 2
- Forced fumbles: 5
- Stats at CFL.ca

Isaac Darkangelo (born April 26, 2000) is an American professional football linebacker for the Toronto Argonauts of the Canadian Football League (CFL). He played college football at Northern Michigan and Illinois. He has also been a member of the Detroit Lions and Las Vegas Raiders of the National Football League (NFL), and the Michigan Panthers of the United Football League (UFL).

== Early life ==
Darkangelo played high school football at Detroit Catholic Central High School in Novi, Michigan. He was named first-team all-state his junior year in 2016. He also participated in golf, lacrosse and wrestling in high school.

== College career ==
Darkangelo first played college football for the Northern Michigan Wildcats from 2018 to 2019. He played 10 games his freshman year in 2018, recording 60 tackles, two sacks, and one forced fumble. He appeared in 10 games during the 2019 season and made 105 tackles, garnering second-team All-GLIAC recognition.

Darkangelo transferred to play for the Illinois Fighting Illini from 2020 to 2022. He redshirted during the COVID-19 shortened 2020 season. He played in all 12 games in 2021, recording seven tackles and also being named Academic All-Big Ten. Darkangelo appeared in all 13 games, starting two, during his final college season in 2022, totaling 71 tackles, one sack, and one fumble recovery, earning honorable All-Big Ten honors. He was also named academic All-Big Ten for the second consecutive season.

== Professional career ==
Pre-draft measurables
Height	Weight	Arm length	Hand span	Wingspan	40-yard dash	10-yard split	20-yard split	20-yard shuttle	Three-cone drill	Vertical jump	Broad jump	Bench press
6 ft 0 3/8 in (1.84 m)	227 lb (103 kg)	31 1/4 in (0.79 m)	9 1/2 in (0.24 m)	6 ft 3 7/8 in (1.93 m)	4.60 s	1.55 s	2.68 s	4.26 s	7.01 s	31.0 in (0.79 m)	9 ft 2 in (2.79 m)	23 reps
All values from Pro Day

=== Detroit Lions ===
After going undrafted in the 2023 NFL draft, Darkangelo signed with the Detroit Lions on May 12, 2023. He was waived on May 24, 2023 after the Lions signed veteran Germain Ifedi, and it put them over the 90-man roster limit.

=== Las Vegas Raiders ===
Darkangelo was signed by the Las Vegas Raiders on August 23, 2023. He was waived on August 27, signed to the practice squad on August 31, released from the practice squad on September 11, signed to the practice squad again on November 1, and released from the practice squad again on November 7, 2023.

=== Michigan Panthers ===
Darkangelo signed with the Michigan Panthers on December 21, 2023. He was waived on March 10, 2024.

=== Toronto Argonauts ===
Darkangelo was signed by the Toronto Argonauts of the Canadian Football League (CFL) on May 6, 2024. He was moved to the practice roster on June 1, 2024. He made his CFL debut on August 9, 2024, against the Calgary Stampeders. However, he was released following the team's bye week on August 18, 2024. Shortly after the team's week 12 victory over the Saskatchewan Roughriders, the Argonauts re-signed Darkangelo to the team's practice roster on August 23, 2024. Overall in the 2024 season, Darkangelo played in eight regular season games, starting in five, where he had 35 defensive tackles, five special teams tackles, and one sack. He also played in all three post-season games, including the 111th Grey Cup where he had two special teams tackles in the Argonauts' 41–24 victory over the Winnipeg Blue Bombers.

== Personal life ==
Darkangelo's sister, Shiann Darkangelo, is a professional hockey player.
