= Mike Nichols on screen and stage =

Entertainment achievements of Mike Nichols

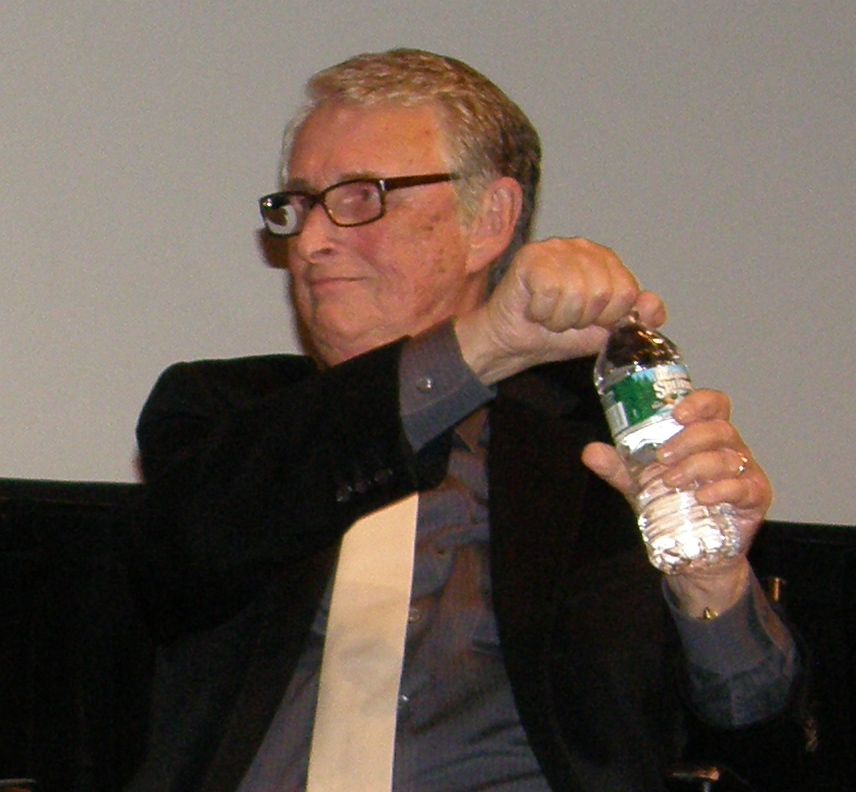
Mike Nichols in 2010

Mike Nichols was an American comedian, director, and producer of the stage and screen. He began his career in the 1950s as a comedian alongside Elaine May doing improvisational comedy. Together they formed the comedy duo Nichols and May. Their live improv act was a hit sensation on Broadway, and the first of their three albums won a Grammy Award for Best Comedy Album in 1962. Nichols also became known as a director of plays on the Broadway stage including Neil Simon's Barefoot in the Park (1963), The Odd Couple (1965), and Plaza Suite (1968). He also directed acclaimed revival productions of Anton Chekov's The Seagull (2002), Arthur Miller's Death of a Salesman (2012) and Harold Pinter's Betrayal (2013).

Nichols was also known as a film director breaking out with Who's Afraid of Virginia Woolf? (1966) starring Elizabeth Taylor and Richard Burton, and The Graduate (1967) starring Dustin Hoffman and Anne Bancroft. Nichols continued directing acclaimed films such as the war film Catch-22 (1970), the sexual coming of age drama Carnal Knowledge (1971), the drama Silkwood (1983), the romantic comedy Working Girl (1988), the farce comedy The Birdcage (1996), the political drama Primary Colors (1998), the romantic drama Closer (2004), and biographical drama Charlie Wilson's War (2007). Nichols also became known for his work on television directing HBO adaptations of Margaret Edson's Wit (2001) and Tony Kushner's Angels in America (2003) starring Meryl Streep and Al Pacino.

== Theatre ==
Year	Title	Director	Producer	Writer	Performer	Venue	Ref.
1960	An Evening with Mike Nichols and Elaine May	No	No	Yes	Yes	John Golden Theatre	
1963	Barefoot in the Park	Yes	No	No	No	The Biltmore Theatre	
1964	The Knack	Yes	No	No	No	New Theatre	
1964	Luv	Yes	No	No	No	Helen Hayes Theatre	
1965	The Odd Couple	Yes	No	No	No	Plymouth Theatre	
1966	The Apple Tree	Yes	No	No	No	Shubert Theatre	
1967	The Little Foxes	Yes	No	No	No	Ethel Barrymore Theatre	
1968	Plaza Suite	Yes	No	No	No	Plymouth Theatre	
1971	The Prisoner of Second Avenue	Yes	No	No	No	Eugene O'Neill Theatre	
1973	Uncle Vanya	Yes	No	No	No	Circle in the Square Theatre	
1976	Streamers	Yes	No	No	No	Mitzi E. Newhouse Theatre	
1976	Comedians	Yes	No	No	No	Music Box Theatre	
1977	Annie	No	Yes	No	No	Eugene O'Neill Theatre	
1977	The Gin Game	Yes	Yes	No	No	John Golden Theatre	
1978	Drinks Before Dinner	Yes	No	No	No	Public Theater	
1980	Who's Afraid of Virginia Woolf?	No	No	No	Yes	Long Wharf Theatre	
1980	Billy Bishop Goes to War	No	Yes	No	No	Morosco Theatre	
1980	Lunch Hour	Yes	No	No	No	Ethel Barrymore Theatre	
1981	Fools	Yes	No	No	No	Eugene O'Neill Theatre	
1981	Grown Ups	No	Yes	No	No	Lyceum Theatre	
1984	The Real Thing	Yes	No	No	No	Plymouth Theatre	
1984	Hurlyburly	Yes	No	No	No	Ethel Barrymore Theatre	
1984	Whoopi Goldberg	No	Yes	No	No	Lyceum Theatre	
1986	Social Security	Yes	No	No	No	Ethel Barrymore Theatre	
1987	Standup Shakespeare	Yes	No	No	No	Theatre 890	
1988	Waiting for Godot	Yes	Yes	No	No	Mitzi E. Newhouse Theater at Lincoln Center	
1990	Eliot Loves	Yes	Yes	No	No	Goodman Theatre	
1992	Death and the Maiden	Yes	No	No	No	Brooks Atkinson Theatre	
1996	The Designated Mourner	No	No	No	Yes	Royal National Theatre	
1999	James Naughton: Street of Dreams	Yes	No	No	No	Promenade Theatre	
2001	The Seagull	Yes	No	No	No	The Public Theater, Off-Broadway	
2003	The Play What I Wrote	No	Yes	No	No	Lyceum Theatre	
2004	Whoopi: The 25th Anniversary Show	No	Yes	No	No	Lyceum Theatre	
2005	Spamalot	Yes	No	No	No	Shubert Theatre	
2008	The Country Girl	Yes	No	No	No	Bernard B. Jacobs Theatre	
2012	Death of a Salesman	Yes	No	No	No	Ethel Barrymore Theatre	
2013	Betrayal	Yes	No	No	No	Ethel Barrymore Theatre	

== Film ==
Year	Title	Director	Producer	Notes
1966	Who's Afraid of Virginia Woolf?	Yes	No	Based on the 1962 play by Edward Albee
1967	The Graduate	Yes	No	Based on the 1963 novella by Charles Webb
1968	Teach Me!	Yes	No	Short film; Also writer
1970	Catch-22	Yes	No	Based on the 1961 novel by Joseph Heller
1971	Carnal Knowledge	Yes	Yes	
1973	The Day of the Dolphin	Yes	No	Based on the 1967 novel by Robert Merle
1975	The Fortune	Yes	Yes	
1980	Gilda Live	Yes	No	Documentary
1983	Silkwood	Yes	Yes	Based on Who Killed Karen Silkwood? by Howard Kohn
1986	Heartburn	Yes	Yes	Based on the 1983 novel by Nora Ephron
1988	Biloxi Blues	Yes	No	Based on the 1984 play by Neil Simon
1988	Working Girl	Yes	No	
1990	Postcards from the Edge	Yes	Yes	Based on the 1987 novel by Carrie Fisher
1991	Regarding Henry	Yes	Yes	
1993	The Remains of the Day	No	Yes	Based on the 1989 novel by Kazuo Ishiguro
1994	Wolf	Yes	No	
1996	The Birdcage	Yes	Yes	Based on La Cage aux Folles by Jean Poiret and the 1978 film by Édouard Molinaro, Francis Veber, Marcello Danon and Jean Poiret
1998	Primary Colors	Yes	Yes	Based on Primary Colors: A Novel of Politics by Joe Klein
2000	What Planet Are You From?	Yes	Yes	
2004	Closer	Yes	Yes	Based on the 1997 play by Patrick Marber
2007	Charlie Wilson's War	Yes	No	Based on Charlie Wilson's War: The Extraordinary Story of the Largest Covert Operation in History by George Crile III

Executive producer

- The Longshot (1986)
- Friends with Kids (2011)
- Crescendo! The Power of Music (2014) (Documentary)

Performer

- The Designated Mourner (1997) as Jack

== Television ==
Year	Title	Role	Notes	Ref.
1957–1958	The Steve Allen Show	Himself	2 episodes	
1958	Omnibus	Performer	Episode: "The Suburban Review"	
1958	The DuPont Show of the Month	Rod Carter	Episode: "The Red Mill"	
1959–1960	The Jack Paar Tonight Show	Himself	5 episodes	
1960	Playhouse 90	Arthur Millman	Episode: "Journey to the Day"	
1960	What's My Line?	Himself	Episode: "Elaine May & Mike Nichols"	
1962	President Kennedy's Birthday Salute	Himself	Television special	
1964–1965	The Jack Paar Program	Himself (guest)	6 episodes	
1976	Family		Producer; Television series	
1986	Looney Tunes 50th Anniversary Special	Himself (cameo)	Television special	
2001	Wit		Director, writer, and executive producer Television movie	
2003	Angels in America		Director and executive producer Miniseries, 6 episodes	

== Discography ==
- Improvisations to Music (1958) Mercury ASIN B000W0V9BW
- An Evening with Mike Nichols and Elaine May (1960) Mercury ASIN B000W06CCS
- Mike Nichols & Elaine May Examine Doctors (1961) Mercury MG 20680/SR 60680 ASIN B000W0AGDY
- In Retrospect (1962) Polygram, compilation, re-released as compact disc in 1996 ASIN B000001EKT

== See also ==
- Mike Nichols' unrealized projects
