= List of awards and nominations received by Mike Nichols =

Mike Nichols awards and nominations
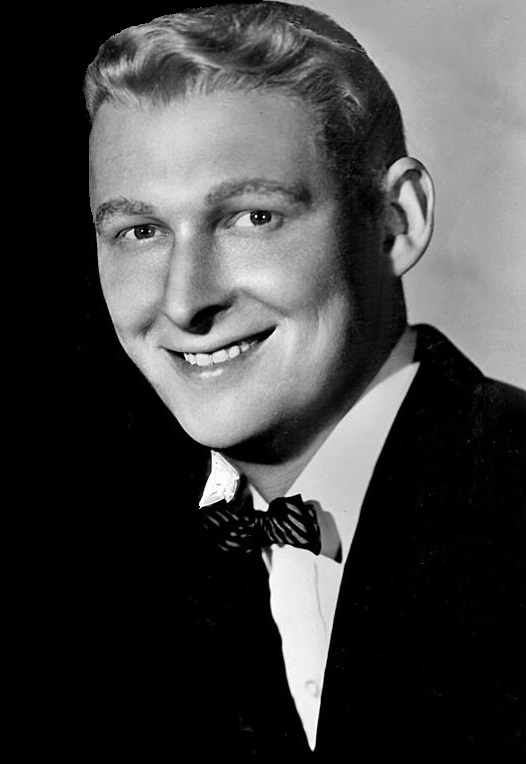
- Nichols in 1958
Awards and nominations
Award	Wins	Nominations
Academy Award	1	5
BAFTA Award	3	4
Emmy Awards	4	6
Golden Globe Award	1	5
Grammy Award	1	4
Tony Award	8	16

This article is a List of awards and nominations received by Mike Nichols.

Mike Nichols was an American filmmaker, producer, comedian, and theatre director. He is one of the few entertainers to have won the "EGOT"; the Emmy, Grammy, Academy Award (Oscar), and Tony awards for television, film and theatre. He also received numerous honors including the Film Society of Lincoln Center Gala tribute in 1999, Peabody Award in 2001, Kennedy Center Honors in 2003, and AFI Life Achievement Award in 2010

Nichols received five Academy Award nominations, winning Best Director for The Graduate (1967). He was also nominated for his work on Who's Afraid of Virginia Woolf? (1966), Silkwood (1983), Working Girl (1988), and for producing The Remains of the Day (1993).

Nichols is also known for his extensive work on Broadway, receiving 16 Tony Award nominations and winning 8 Tony Awards for Barefoot in the Park (1964), Luv/The Odd Couple (1965), Plaza Suite (1968), The Prisoner of Second Avenue (1972), Annie (1977), The Real Thing (1984), Monty Python's Spamalot (2005), and Death of a Salesman (2012). Nichols also received Primetime Emmy Awards for Wit (2001) and Angels in America (2003).

For his collaborations with Elaine May, Nichols was nominated for three Grammy Awards, winning for Best Comedy Album in 1962.

== Major associations ==
=== Academy Award ===
Year	Category	Nominated work	Result	Ref.
1966	Best Director	Who's Afraid of Virginia Woolf?	Nominated	
1967	Best Director	The Graduate	Won	
1983	Best Director	Silkwood	Nominated	
1988	Best Director	Working Girl	Nominated	
1993	Best Picture	The Remains of the Day	Nominated	

=== BAFTA Awards ===
Year	Category	Nominated work	Result	Ref.
British Academy Film Awards
1967	Best Film	Who's Afraid of Virginia Woolf?	Won	
1968	Best Film	The Graduate	Won	
1968	Best Director	The Graduate	Won	
1994	Best Film	The Remains of the Day	Nominated	

=== Emmy Award ===
Year	Category	Nominated work	Result	Ref.
Primetime Emmy Awards
1977	Outstanding Drama Series	Family	Nominated	
2001	Outstanding Made for Television Movie	Wit	Won	
2001	Outstanding Directing for a Miniseries or Movie	Wit	Won	
2001	Outstanding Writing for a Miniseries or a Movie	Wit	Nominated	
2004	Outstanding Miniseries	Angels in America	Won	
2004	Outstanding Directing for a Miniseries or Movie	Angels in America	Won	

=== Golden Globe Awards ===
Year	Category	Nominated work	Result	Ref.
1966	Best Director	Who's Afraid of Virginia Woolf?	Nominated	
1967	Best Director	The Graduate	Won	
1983	Best Director	Silkwood	Nominated	
1988	Best Director	Working Girl	Nominated	
2004	Best Director	Closer	Nominated	

=== Grammy Awards ===
Year	Category	Nominated work	Result	Ref.
1959	Best Documentary or Spoken Word	Improvisations to Music	Nominated	
1959	Best Comedy Album	Improvisations to Music	Nominated	
1962	Best Comedy Album	An Evening with Mike Nichols and Elaine May	Won	
1963	Best Comedy Album	Mike Nichols & Elaine May Examine Doctors	Nominated	

=== Tony Award ===
Year	Category	Nominated work	Result	Ref.
1964	Best Direction of a Play	Barefoot in the Park	Won	
1965	Best Direction of a Play	Luv and The Odd Couple	Won	
1967	Best Direction of a Musical	The Apple Tree	Nominated	
1968	Best Direction of a Play	Plaza Suite	Won	
1972	Best Direction of a Play	The Prisoner of Second Avenue	Won	
1974	Best Direction of a Play	Uncle Vanya	Nominated	
1977	Best Musical	Annie	Won	
1977	Best Direction of a Play	Comedians	Nominated	
1977	Best Direction of a Play	Streamers	Nominated	
1978	Best Direction of a Play	The Gin Game	Nominated	
1978	Best Play	The Gin Game	Nominated	
1984	Best Direction of a Play	The Real Thing	Won	
2003	Best Special Theatrical Event	The Play What I Wrote	Nominated	
2005	Best Direction of a Musical	Monty Python's Spamalot	Won	
2005	Best Special Theatrical Event	Whoopi the 25th Anniversary Show	Nominated	
2012	Best Direction of a Play	Death of a Salesman	Won	

== Other theatre awards ==
Year	Category	Title	Results	Ref.
Drama Desk Award
1976	Outstanding Director of a Play	Streamers	Nominated	
1977	Outstanding Director of a Play	Comedians	Won	
1978	Outstanding Director of a Play	The Gin Game	Nominated	
1984	Outstanding Director of a Play	The Real Thing	Nominated	
2005	Outstanding Director of a Musical	Spamalot	Nominated	
2012	Outstanding Director of a Play	Death of a Salesman	Won	

== Honorary Awards ==
Organizations	Year	Award	Result	Ref.
American Academy of Achievement	1989	Golden Plate Award	Honored	
Film Society of Lincoln Center	1999	Chaplin Award and Gala tribute	Honored	
Peabody Award	2001	Award for Wit	Honored	
Kennedy Center Honors	2003	Inductee and Medal	Honored	
American Film Institute	2010	AFI Lifetime Achievement Award	Honored	
