= Mike Nichols =

American film and theatre director (1931–2014)

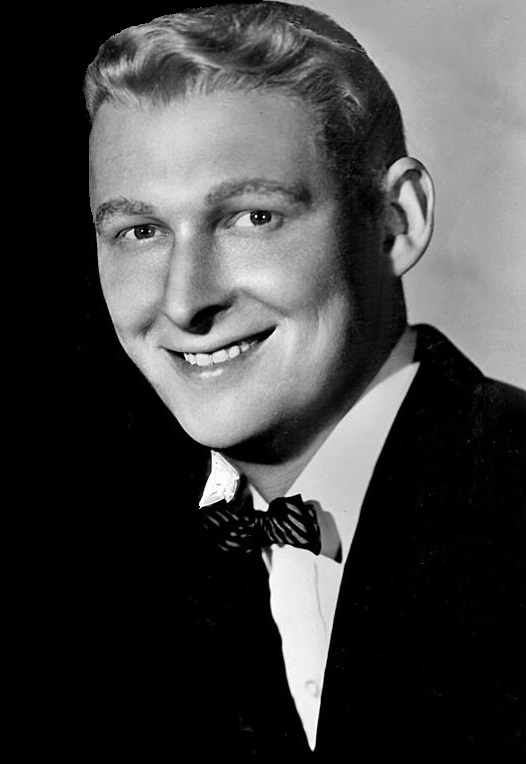
- Nichols in 1958
- Born: Igor Mikhail Peschkowsky; November 6, 1931; Berlin, Weimar Germany
- Died: November 19, 2014 (aged 83); New York City, U.S.
- Citizenship: Germany (until 1935); Stateless (1935–1944); U.S. (from 1944)
- Education: University of Chicago
- Occupations: Director; producer; comedian
- Years active: 1955–2014
- Spouses: Patricia Scott (m. 1957; div. 1960) Margot Callas (m. 1963; div. 1974) Annabel Davis-Goff (m. 1975; div. 1986) Diane Sawyer (m. 1988)
- Children: 3
- Relatives: Rachel Nichols (daughter-in-law)

Mike Nichols (born Igor Mikhail Peschkowsky; November 6, 1931 – November 19, 2014) was an American film and theatre director and comedian. He worked across a range of genres and had an aptitude for getting the best out of actors regardless of their experience. He is one of 28 people to have won all four of the major American entertainment awards: Emmy, Grammy, Oscar, and Tony (EGOT). His other honors included three BAFTA Awards, the Lincoln Center Gala Tribute in 1999, the National Medal of Arts in 2001, the Kennedy Center Honors in 2003 and the AFI Life Achievement Award in 2010. His films received a total of 42 Academy Award nominations, and seven wins.

Nichols began his career in the 1950s with the comedy improvisational troupe The Compass Players, predecessor of The Second City, in Chicago. He then teamed up with his improv partner, Elaine May, to form the comedy duo Nichols and May. Their live improv act was a hit on Broadway, and each of their three albums was nominated for the Grammy Award for Best Comedy Album; their second album, An Evening with Mike Nichols and Elaine May, won the award in 1962. After they disbanded, he began directing plays, and quickly became known for his innovative theatre productions.

His Broadway directing debut was Neil Simon's Barefoot in the Park in 1963, with Robert Redford and Elizabeth Ashley. He continued to direct plays on Broadway, including Luv (1964), and The Odd Couple (1965) for each of which he received Tony Awards. He won his sixth Tony Award for Best Direction of a Play with a revival of Arthur Miller's Death of a Salesman (2012) starring Philip Seymour Hoffman. His final directing credit was the revival of Harold Pinter's Betrayal (2013). Nichols directed or produced more than 25 Broadway plays throughout his prolific career.

Warner Bros. invited Nichols to direct his first film, Who's Afraid of Virginia Woolf? (1966), followed by The Graduate (1967) for which Nichols won the Academy Award for Best Director. Nichols also directed Catch-22 (1970), Carnal Knowledge (1971), Silkwood (1983), Working Girl (1988), Postcards from the Edge (1990), Wolf (1994), The Birdcage (1996), Primary Colors (1998), Closer (2004), and Charlie Wilson's War (2007). Nichols additionally directed the HBO television film Wit (2001), and miniseries Angels in America (2003), both of which won him the Primetime Emmy Award for Outstanding Directing for a Limited or Anthology Series or Movie.

== Early life ==
Nichols was born Igor Mikhail Peschkowsky (Yiddish: איגאָר מיכאַיל פּעשקאָווסקי) on November 6, 1931, in Berlin, Germany. He was a son of Brigitte Claudia (née Landauer; Yiddish: בריגיטע קלאַודיאַ לאַנדאַורער פּעשאָווסקי) and Pavel Peschkowsky (Yiddish: פּאַוועל פּעשאָווסקי), a physician. His father was born in Vienna, Austria, to a Russian-Jewish immigrant family. Nichols's father's family had been wealthy and lived in Siberia, leaving after the Russian Revolution, and settling in Germany around 1920. Nichols's mother's family were German Jews. His maternal grandparents were Gustav Landauer, a leading theorist on anarchism, and author Hedwig Lachmann.

Around the age of four, Nichols had lost his hair following an allergic reaction to an inoculation for whooping cough; as a result, he wore wigs and false eyebrows throughout his entire adulthood.

In April 1939, when the Nazis were arresting Jews in Berlin, seven-year-old Mikhail and his three-year-old brother Robert were sent alone to the United States to join their father, who had fled months earlier. His mother joined the family by escaping through Italy in 1940. The family moved to New York City on April 28, 1939. His father, whose original name was Pavel Nikolaevich Peschkowsky, changed his name to Paul Nichols, Nichols derived from his Russian patronymic. Before Paul Nichols had received his U.S. medical license, he was employed by a union on 42nd Street, X-raying union members. He later had a successful medical practice in Manhattan, enabling the family to live near Central Park.

Before he established his practice, he was a union doctor, and part of his job was X-raying union members. They didn't know about shielding X-ray machines, and he died of leukemia at 44. [in 1944]

– Mike Nichols

In 1944, Mike Nichols became a naturalized citizen of the United States and attended public elementary school in Manhattan (PS 87). After graduating from the Walden School, a private progressive school on Central Park West, Nichols briefly attended New York University before dropping out. In 1950, he enrolled in the pre-med program at the University of Chicago. He later described this college period as "paradise", recalling how "I never had a friend from the time I came to this country until I got to the University of Chicago."

While in Chicago in 1953, Nichols joined the staff of struggling classical music station WFMT, 98.7 FM, as an announcer. Co-owner Rita Jacobs asked Nichols to create a folk music program on Saturday nights, which he named The Midnight Special. He hosted the program for two years before leaving for New York City. Nichols frequently invited musicians to perform live in the studio and eventually created a unique blend of "folk music and farce, showtunes and satire, odds and ends", along with his successor Norm Pellegrini. The program celebrated its 70th anniversary in the same time slot in 2023.

== Comedy career ==
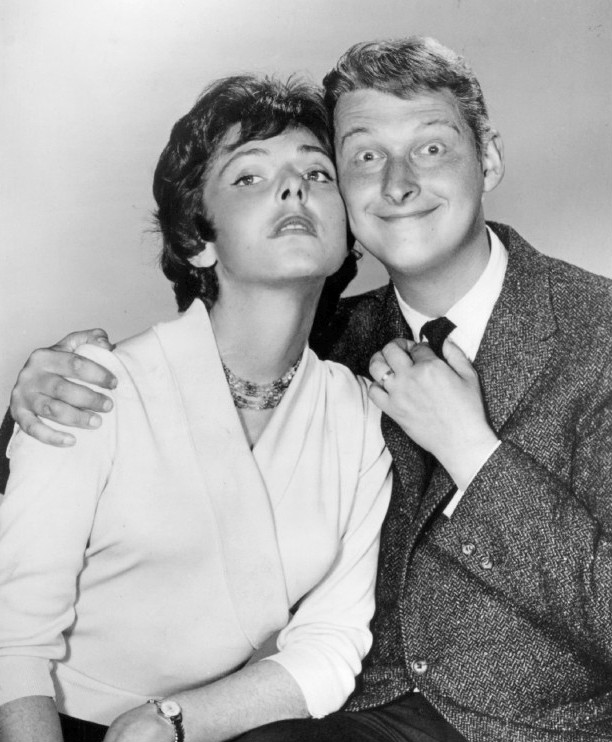
Nichols and May, c. 1960

Nichols first saw Elaine May when she was sitting in the front row while he was playing the lead in a Chicago production of Miss Julie, and they made eye contact. Weeks later he ran into her in a train station where he started a conversation in an assumed accent, pretending to be a spy, and she played along, using another accent. They hit it off immediately, which led to a brief romance. Later in his career, he said "Elaine was very important to me from the moment I saw her."

In 1953, Nichols left Chicago for New York City to study method acting under Lee Strasberg, but was unable to find stage work there. He was invited back to join Chicago's Compass Players in 1955, the predecessor to Chicago's Second City, whose members included May, Shelley Berman, Del Close, and Nancy Ponder, directed by Paul Sills. In Chicago, he started doing improvisational routines with May, which eventually led to the formation of the comedy duo Nichols and May in 1958, first performing in New York City.

They performed live satirical comedy acts and eventually released three records of their routines, which became best-sellers. They also appeared in nightclubs and were on radio and television. Jack Rollins, who later became Woody Allen's manager and producer, invited them to audition and was most impressed: "Their work was so startling, so new, as fresh as could be. I was stunned by how really good they were, actually as impressed by their acting technique as by their comedy ... I thought, My God, these are two people writing hilarious comedy on their feet!"

In 1960, Nichols and May opened the Broadway show An Evening With Mike Nichols and Elaine May, directed by Arthur Penn. The LP album of the show won the 1962 Grammy Award for Best Comedy Album. Personal idiosyncrasies and tensions, such as on the unsuccessful A Matter of Position, a play written by May and starring Nichols, eventually drove the duo apart to pursue other projects in 1961. About their sudden breakup, director Arthur Penn said, "They set the standard and then they had to move on," while talk show host Dick Cavett said "they were one of the comic meteors in the sky." Comedy historian Gerald Nachman describes the effect of their break-up on American comedy:

Nichols and May are perhaps the most ardently missed of all the satirical comedians of their era. When Nichols and May split up, they left no imitators, no descendants, no blueprints or footprints to follow. No one could touch them.

They later reconciled and worked together many times. They appeared together at President Jimmy Carter's inaugural gala, in 1977, and in a 1980 New Haven stage revival of Who's Afraid of Virginia Woolf? with Swoosie Kurtz and James Naughton. May scripted Nichols's films The Birdcage (1996) and Primary Colors (1998). In 2010, at the AFI's "Life Achievement Award" ceremony, May gave a humor-filled tribute to Nichols.

== Career as a director ==
=== 1960–1970: Broadway debut and film breakthrough ===
Nichols directed several of Neil Simon's plays

Pre-film stage career

After the professional split with May, Nichols went to Vancouver, British Columbia, to work in the theater, directing a production of Oscar Wilde's The Importance of Being Earnest and acting in a revival of George Bernard Shaw's St. Joan. In 1963, Nichols was chosen to direct Neil Simon's play Barefoot in the Park. He realized at once that he was meant to be a director, saying in a 2003 interview: "On the first day of rehearsal, I thought, 'Well, look at this. Here is what I was meant to do.' I knew instantly that I was home". Barefoot in the Park was a big hit, running for 1,530 performances and earning Nichols a Tony Award for his direction.

This began a series of highly successful plays on Broadway (often from works by Simon) that would establish his reputation. After directing an off-Broadway production of Ann Jellicoe's The Knack, Nichols directed Murray Schisgal's play Luv in 1964. Again the show was a hit and Nichols won a Tony Award (shared with The Odd Couple). In 1965 he directed another play by Neil Simon, The Odd Couple. The original production starred Art Carney as Felix Ungar and Walter Matthau as Oscar Madison. The play ran for 966 performances and won Tony Awards for Nichols, Simon and Matthau. Overall, Nichols won nine Tony Awards, including six for Best Director of either a play or a musical, one for Best Play, and one for Best Musical.

Who's Afraid of Virginia Woolf?

In 1966, Nichols was a star stage director and Time magazine called him "the most in-demand director in the American theatre." Although he had no experience in filmmaking, after he befriended Elizabeth Taylor and Richard Burton, Warner Bros. invited Nichols to direct a screen adaptation of Edward Albee's Who's Afraid of Virginia Woolf?, starring Taylor, Burton, George Segal, and Sandy Dennis, for which he received a fee of $400,000. The film was critically acclaimed, with critics calling Nichols "the new Orson Welles", and a financial success, the number 1 film of 1966.

The film was considered groundbreaking for having a level of profanity and sexual innuendo unheard of at that time. It won five Academy Awards and garnered thirteen nominations (including Nichols's first nomination for Best Director), earning the distinctions of being one of only two films nominated in every eligible category at the Oscars (the other being Cimarron), and the first film to have its entire credited cast nominated for acting Oscars. It also won three BAFTA Awards and was later ranked No. 67 in AFI's 100 Years ... 100 Movies (10th Anniversary Edition).

The Graduate

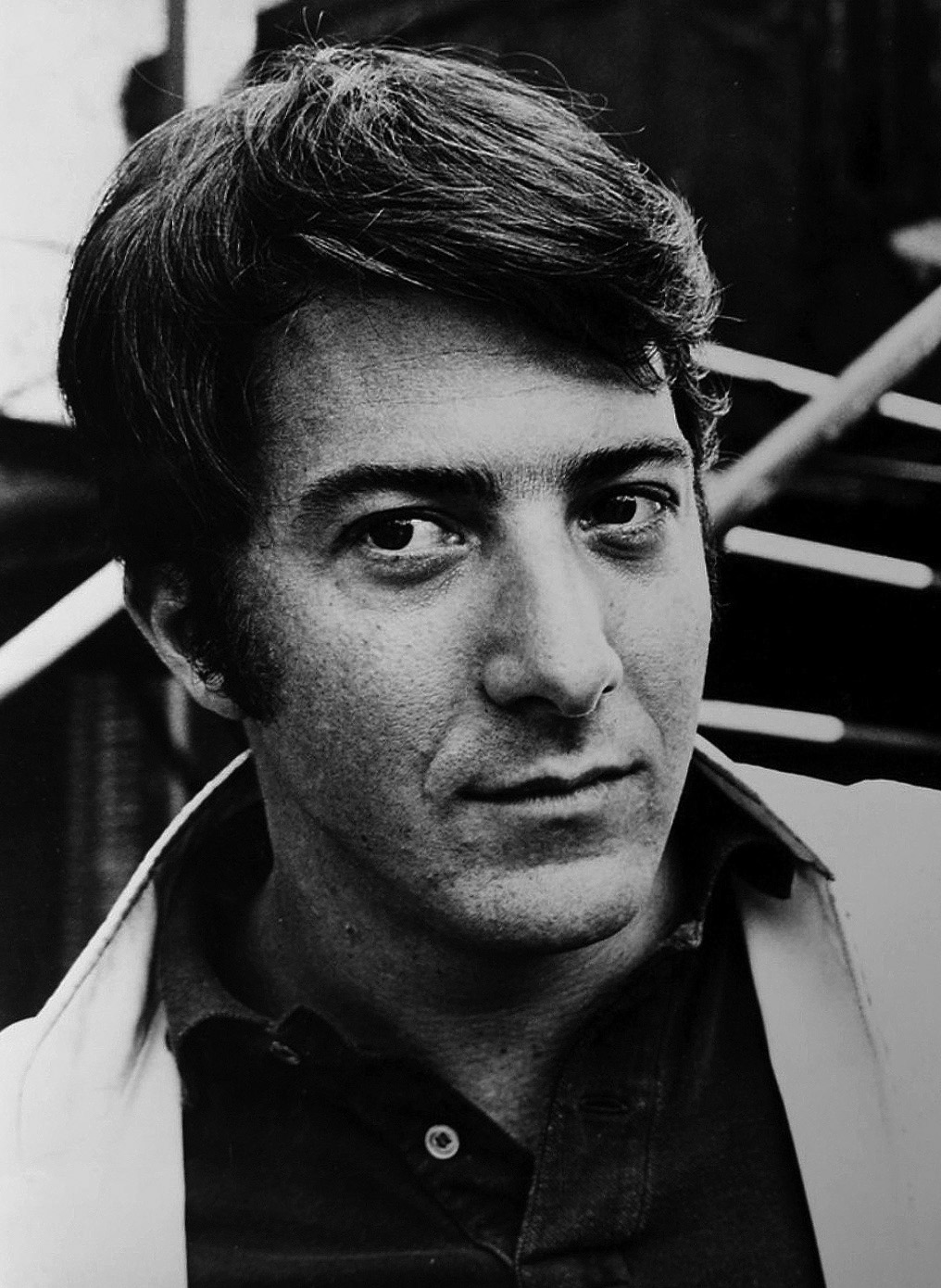
Dustin Hoffman (1968) appeared in the Nichols-directed film The Graduate

His next film was The Graduate (1967), starring Dustin Hoffman, Anne Bancroft and Katharine Ross for which he was paid $150,000, a deal he had made four years earlier with producer Joseph E. Levine. It became the highest-grossing film of 1967 and one of the highest-grossing films in history up to that date, with Nichols receiving 16 2/3% of the profits, making him a millionaire. It was nominated for seven Academy Awards, including Best Picture, with Nichols winning as Best Director. In 2007, it was ranked #17 in AFI's 100 Years ... 100 Movies (10th Anniversary Edition).

However, getting the film made was difficult for Nichols, who, while noted for being a successful Broadway director, was still an unknown in Hollywood. Producer Lawrence Turman, who wanted only Nichols to direct it, was continually turned down for financing. He then contacted Levine, who said he would finance the film because he had associated with Nichols on The Knack, and because he heard that Elizabeth Taylor specifically wanted Nichols to direct her and Richard Burton in Virginia Woolf. With financing assured, Nichols suggested Buck Henry for screenwriter, although Henry's experience had also been mostly in improvised comedy, and had no writing background. Nichols said to Henry, "I think you could do it; I think you should do it."

Nichols also took a chance on using Dustin Hoffman, who had no film experience, for the lead, when others had suggested using known star Robert Redford. Hoffman credits Nichols for having taken a great risk in giving him, a relative unknown, the starring role: "I don't know of another instance of a director at the height of his powers who would take a chance and cast someone like me in that part. It took tremendous courage." The quality of the cinematography was also influenced by Nichols, who chose Oscar winner Robert Surtees to do the photography. Surtees, who had photographed major films since the 1920s, including Ben-Hur, said later, "It took everything I had learned over 30 years to be able to do the job. I knew that Mike Nichols was a young director who went in for a lot of camera. We did more things in this picture than I ever did in one film."

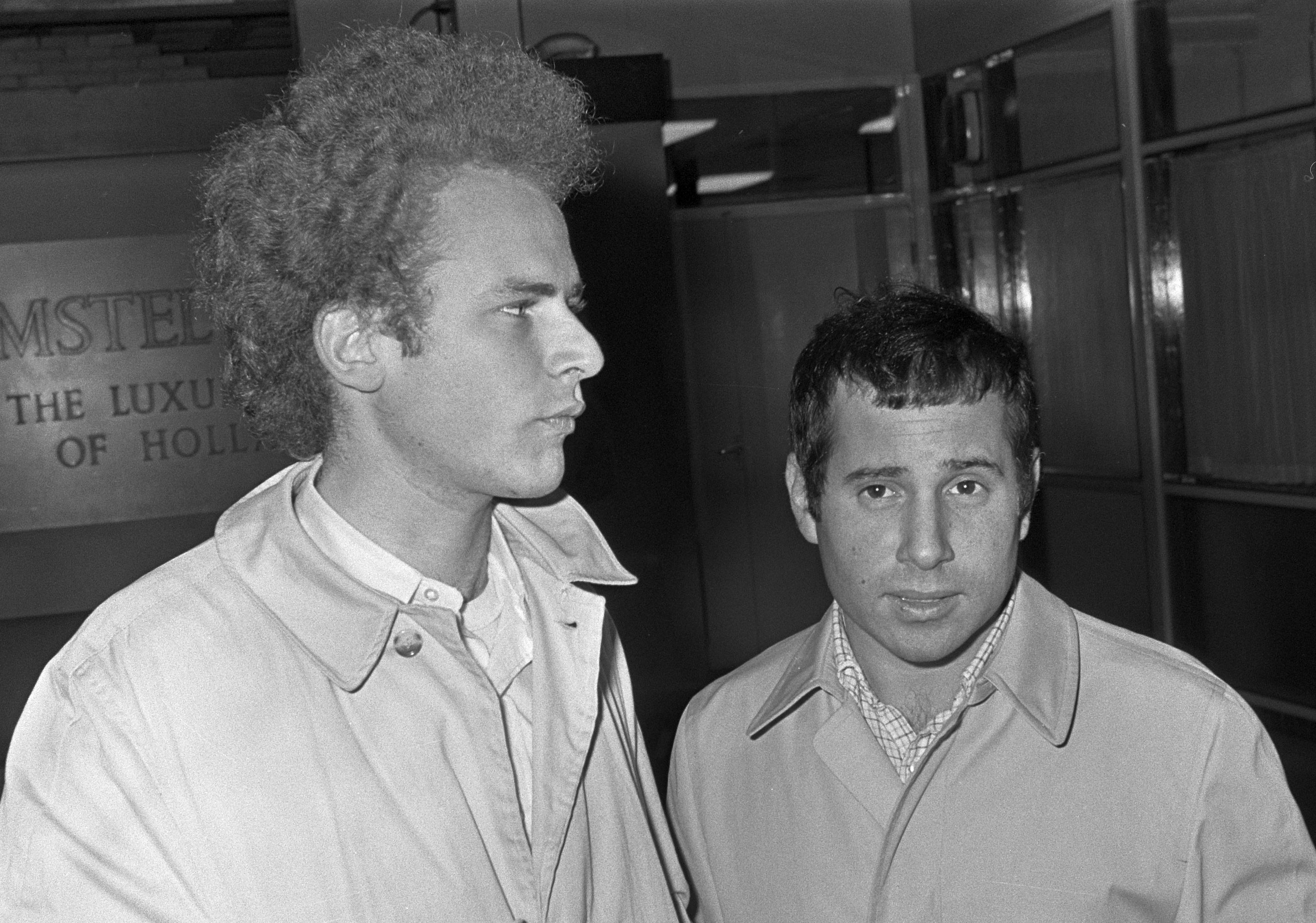
Nichols chose Simon & Garfunkel to write the music for The Graduate

Nichols also chose the music by Simon and Garfunkel. When Paul Simon was taking too long to write new songs for the film, he used existing songs, originally planning to replace them with newly written ones. In the end only one new song was available, and Nichols used the existing previously released songs. At one point, when Nichols heard Paul Simon's song, "Mrs. Roosevelt", he suggested to Simon that he change it to "Mrs. Robinson". The song won a Grammy after the film was released and became America's number 1 pop song. Nichols selected all the numerous songs for the film and chose which scenes they would be used in. The placement and selection of songs would affect the way audiences understood the film. Even actor William Daniels, who played Hoffman's father, remembers that after first hearing the songs, especially "The Sound of Silence", he thought, "Oh, wait a minute. That changed the whole idea of the picture for me," suddenly realizing the film would not be a typical comedy.

Nichols had previously returned to Broadway to direct The Apple Tree, starring Second City alumna, Barbara Harris. After doing The Graduate, he again returned to the Broadway stage with a revival of Lillian Hellman's The Little Foxes in 1967, which ran for 100 performances. He then directed Neil Simon's Plaza Suite in 1968, earning him another Tony Award for Best Director. He also directed the short film Teach Me! (1968), which starred actress Sandy Dennis. In 1969 his film production company, Friwaftt, was acquired by Avco Embassy, the distributor of The Graduate, who also appointed him to the board of directors. Friwaftt stood for "Fools rush in where angels fear to tread."

Nichols's next film was a big-budget adaptation of Joseph Heller's novel Catch-22 (1970), followed by Carnal Knowledge (1971) starring Jack Nicholson, Ann-Margret, Art Garfunkel and Candice Bergen. Carnal Knowledge was highly controversial upon release because of the casual and blunt depiction of sexual intercourse. In Georgia, a theatre manager was convicted in 1972 of violating the state's obscenity statutes by showing the film, a conviction later overturned by the U.S. Supreme Court in Jenkins v. Georgia.

=== 1971–1989: Rise to prominence and stardom ===
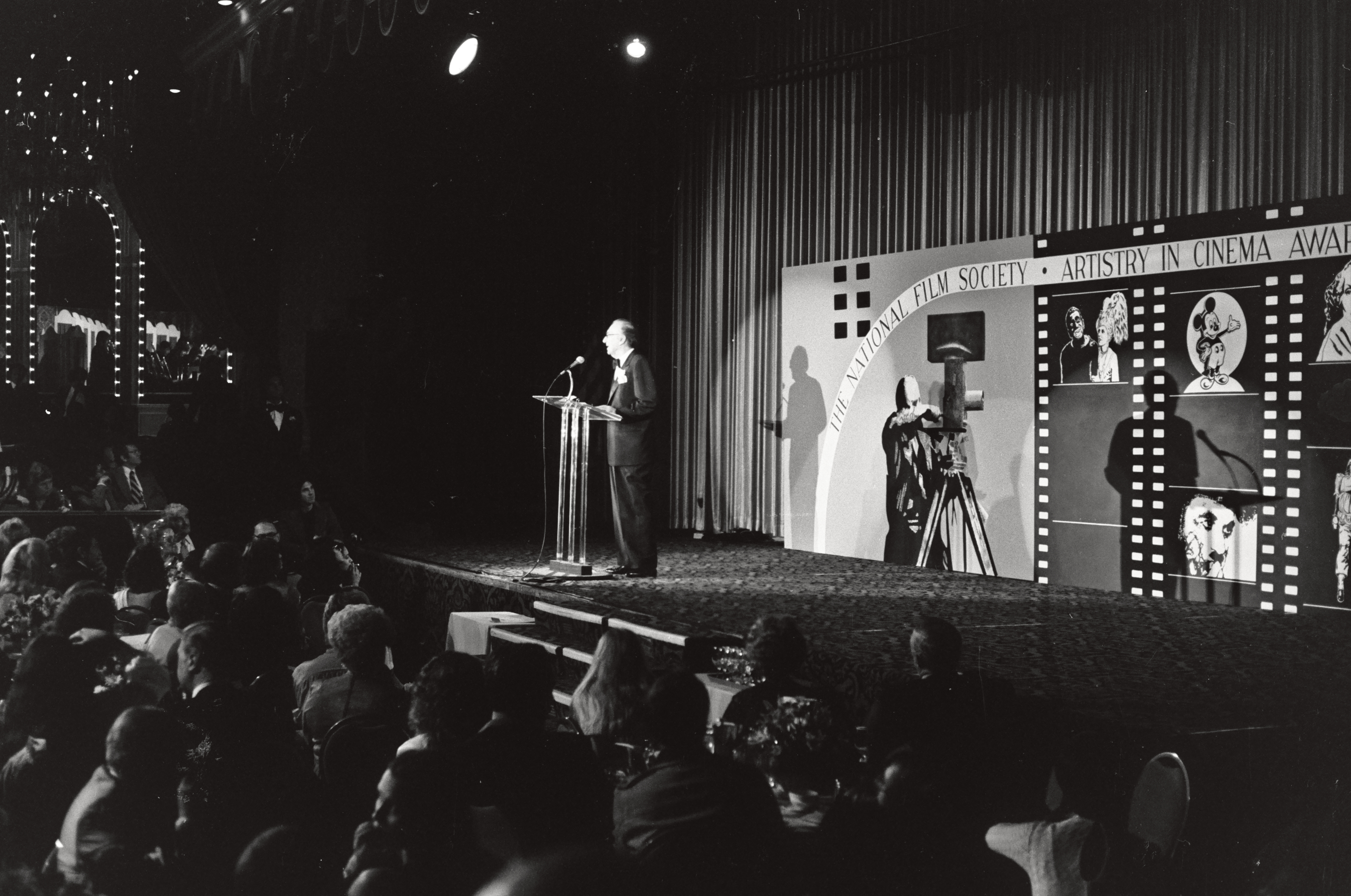
Nichols at the National Film Society in 1979

Nichols returned to Broadway to direct Neil Simon's The Prisoner of Second Avenue in 1971. The play won Nichols another Tony Award for Best Director. In 1973, Nichols directed a revival of Anton Chekhov's Uncle Vanya on Broadway starring George C. Scott and with a new translation by himself and Albert Todd. In 1973 Nichols directed the film The Day of the Dolphin starring George C. Scott, based on the French novel Un animal doué de raison (lit. A Sentient Animal) by Robert Merle and adapted by Buck Henry. The film was not successful financially and received mixed reviews from critics. Nichols next directed The Fortune (1975), starring Warren Beatty, Jack Nicholson and Stockard Channing. Again, the film was a financial failure and received mostly negative reviews. In 1975, Nichols began filming Bogart Slept Here, an original screenplay by Neil Simon. The film starred Robert De Niro and Simon's wife, Marsha Mason. After one week of filming, displeased with the results, Nichols and the studio fired De Niro and shut the production down. Simon would retool the script two years later as The Goodbye Girl. Nichols would not direct another narrative feature film for eight years.

Nichols returned to the stage with two moderately successful productions in 1976; David Rabe's Streamers opened in April and ran for 478 performances. Trevor Griffiths's Comedians ran for 145 performances. In 1976 Nichols also worked as Executive Producer to create the television drama Family for ABC. The series ran until 1980. In 1977, Nichols produced the original Broadway production of the hugely successful musical Annie, which ran for 2,377 performances until 1983. Nichols won the Tony Award for Best Musical. Later in 1977, Nichols directed D.L. Coburn's The Gin Game. The play ran for 517 performances and won a Tony Award for Best Actress for Jessica Tandy.

In 1980, Nichols directed the documentary Gilda Live, a filmed performance of comedian Gilda Radner's one-woman show Gilda Radner Live on Broadway. It was released at the same time as the album of the show, both of which were successful. Nichols was then involved with two unsuccessful shows: he produced Billy Bishop Goes to War, which opened in 1980 and closed after only twelve performances, and directed Neil Simon's Fools, in 1981, which closed after forty performances. Returning to Hollywood, Nichols's career rebounded in 1983 with the film Silkwood, starring Meryl Streep, Cher and Kurt Russell, based on the life of whistleblower Karen Silkwood. The film was a financial and critical success, with film critic Vincent Canby calling it "the most serious work Mike Nichols has yet done." The film received five Academy Award nominations, including a Best Director nomination for Nichols.

That same year, Nichols and Peter Stone helped to fix up and rewrite the musical My One and Only just days before its Boston premiere. The show eventually went to Broadway and ran for 767 performances, winning Tony Awards for Best Actor, Best Choreography (both for Tommy Tune) and Best Supporting Actor (Charles "Honi" Coles). In 1984, Nichols directed the Broadway premiere of Tom Stoppard's The Real Thing. The New York Times critic Frank Rich wrote that "The Broadway version of The Real Thing—a substantial revision of the original London production—is not only Mr. Stoppard's most moving play, but also the most bracing play that anyone has written about love and marriage in years." The play was nominated for seven Tony Awards and won five, including a Best Director Tony for Nichols. Nichols followed the success with the Broadway premiere of David Rabe's Hurlyburly, also in 1984. It was performed just two blocks away from the theater showing The Real Thing. It was nominated for three Tony Awards and won Best Actress for Judith Ivey.

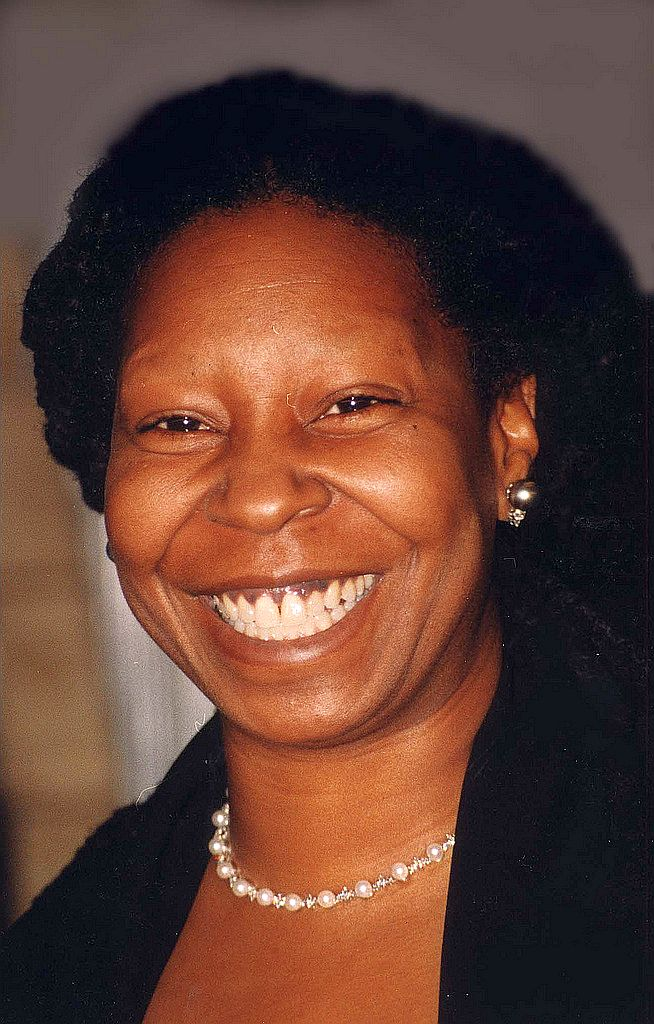
Whoopi Goldberg credits Nichols with discovering her after seeing her perform her one-woman show in 1983

In 1983, Nichols had seen comedian Whoopi Goldberg's one woman show, The Spook Show, at Dance Theater Workshop and wanted to help her expand it. Goldberg's self-titled Broadway show opened in October 1984 and ran for 156 performances. Rosie O'Donnell later said that Nichols had discovered Goldberg while she was struggling as a downtown artist: "He gave her the entire beginning of her career and recognized her brilliance before anyone else." In 1986 Nichols directed the Broadway premiere of Andrew Bergman's Social Security and in 1988 directed Waiting for Godot, starring Robin Williams and Steve Martin. Williams cited Nichols and May as among his early influences for performing intelligent comedy.

In 1986, Nichols directed the film Heartburn, which received mixed reviews, and starred Meryl Streep and Jack Nicholson. In 1988, Nichols completed two feature films. The first was an adaptation of Neil Simon's autobiographical stage play Biloxi Blues starring Matthew Broderick, also receiving mixed critical reviews. Nichols directed one of his most successful films, Working Girl, which starred Melanie Griffith, Harrison Ford and Sigourney Weaver. The film was a huge hit upon its release, and received mostly positive reviews from critics. It was nominated for six Academy Awards (including Best Director for Nichols) and won the Academy Award for Best Song for Carly Simon's "Let the River Run". At one point in the 1980s, Nichols—prone to bouts of depression—reported that he had considered suicide, a feeling apparently brought on by a psychotic episode he experienced after taking the drug Halcion.

=== 1990–1999: Established career ===
In the 1990s, Nichols directed several more successful, well-received films including Postcards from the Edge (1990) starring Meryl Streep and Shirley MacLaine; Primary Colors (1998) starring John Travolta and Emma Thompson; and The Birdcage (1996), an American remake of the 1978 French film La Cage aux Folles starring Robin Williams, Nathan Lane, Gene Hackman and Dianne Wiest. Both The Birdcage and Primary Colors were written by Elaine May, Nichols's comedy partner earlier in his career. Other films directed by Nichols include Regarding Henry (1991) starring Harrison Ford and Wolf (1994) starring Jack Nicholson and Michelle Pfeiffer. When he was honored by Lincoln Center in 1999 for his life's work, Elaine May—speaking once again as his friend—served up the essence of Nichols with the following:

So he's witty, he's brilliant, he's articulate, he's on time, he's prepared and he writes. But is he perfect? He knows you can't really be liked or loved if you're perfect. You have to have just enough flaws. And he does. Just the right, perfect flaws to be absolutely endearing.

=== 2000–2016: Career expansion and later work ===
In the 2000s, Nichols directed the films What Planet Are You From? (2000), Closer (2004) and Charlie Wilson's War (2007), a political drama that was ultimately his final feature film. What Planet Are You From? received mixed reviews from critics, while Closer and Charlie Wilson's War received generally positive reviews and were both nominated for Academy Awards, BAFTA and Golden Globe awards.

Nichols also directed widely acclaimed adaptations of Wit (2001) and Angels in America (2003) for television, winning Emmy Awards for both of them. For his direction of the Broadway musical Spamalot, he won the Tony Award for Best Direction of a Musical in 2005.

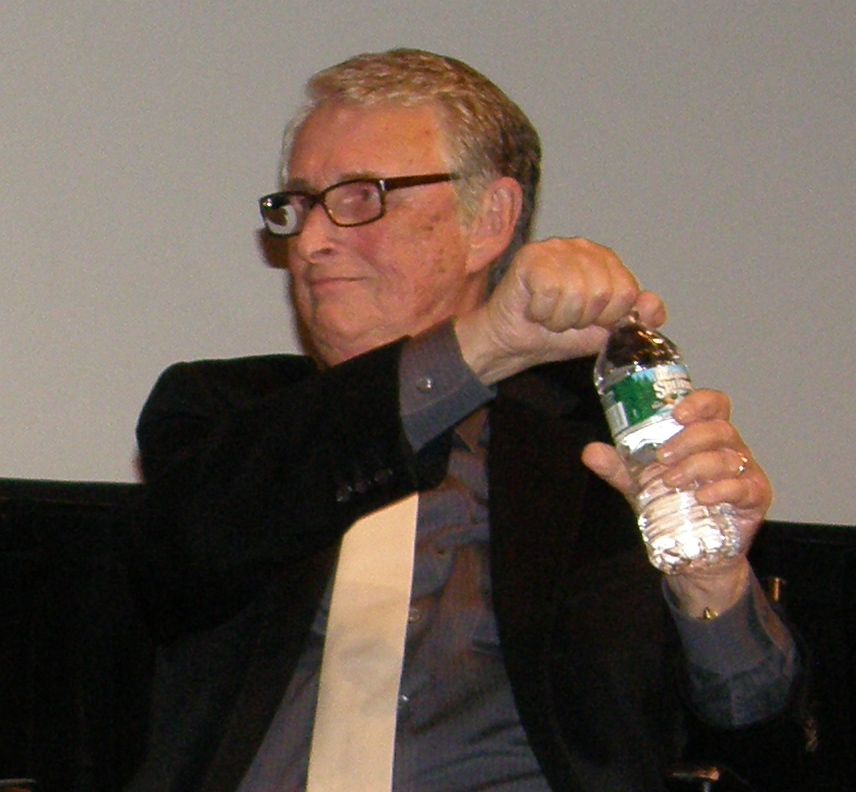
Nichols in 2010

In 2012, Nichols won the Best Direction of a Play Tony Award for a revival of Arthur Miller's Death of a Salesman. In 2013, he directed Daniel Craig and Rachel Weisz in a Broadway revival of Harold Pinter's Betrayal. The play began previews of its limited run on October 1, 2013 at the Ethel Barrymore Theatre, opened on October 27, and closed on January 4, 2014.

Among projects that remained uncompleted when he died, in April 2013 it was announced that Nichols was in talks to direct a film adaptation of Jonathan Tropper's novel One Last Thing Before I Go. The film was to be produced by J. J. Abrams, who previously wrote the Nichols-directed film Regarding Henry (1991). In July 2014, it was announced that Nichols and Streep would reunite for an HBO film of Terrence McNally's 1985 play Master Class, with Nichols directing Streep in the starring role of opera singer Maria Callas.

Nichols was a contributing blogger at The Huffington Post. He was also a co-founder of The New Actors Workshop in New York City, where he occasionally taught. In addition, he remained active in the Directors Guild of America, interviewing fellow film director Bennett Miller on stage in October 2011 after the Guild's screening of Miller's Moneyball.

In January 2016, PBS aired Mike Nichols: American Masters, an American Masters documentary about Nichols directed by his former improv partner, Elaine May. On February 22, 2016, HBO aired the documentary Becoming Mike Nichols.

== Directing style ==
After his early successes as a stage and film director, Nichols had developed a reputation as an auteur who likes to work intimately with his actors and writers, often using them repeatedly in different films. Writer Peter Applebome noted that "few directors have such a gift for getting performances out of actors." During a half-year period in 1967 he had four hit plays running simultaneously on Broadway, during which time his first Hollywood feature, Who's Afraid of Virginia Woolf?, had also become a popular and critical success. Combined with his second film, The Graduate, in 1967, the two films had already earned a total of 20 Oscar nominations, including two for Best Director, and winning it for The Graduate.

Nichols was able to get the best out of actors regardless of their acting experience, whether an unknown such as Dustin Hoffman or a major star like Richard Burton. For his first film, Who's Afraid of Virginia Woolf?, each of the four actors was nominated for an Oscar, with Elizabeth Taylor and Sandy Dennis winning. Burton later said, "I didn't think I could learn anything about comedy—I'd done all of Shakespeare's. But from him I learned," adding, "He conspires with you to get your best."

However, it was Taylor who chose Nichols to be their director, because, writes biographer David Bret, "she particularly admired him because he had done a number of ad-hoc jobs to pay for his education after arriving in America as a seven-year-old Jewish refugee." Producer Ernest Lehman agreed with her choice: "He was the only one who could handle them," he said. "The Burtons were quite intimidating, and we needed a genius like Mike Nichols to combat them." Biographer Kitty Kelley says that neither Taylor nor Burton would ever again reach the heights of acting performance they did in that film.

The same style of directing was used for The Graduate, where, notes film historian Peter Biskind, Nichols took Dustin Hoffman, with no movie acting experience, along with Anne Bancroft, Katharine Ross and others, and managed to get some of their finest acting on screen. This ability to work closely with actors would remain consistent throughout his career. Hoffman credits Nichols for permitting the realistic acting needed for the satirical roles in that film:

It's Nichols's style—he walks that edge of really going as far as he can without falling over the cliff, into disbelief. It's not caricature. That's the highest compliment for satire.

In a similar way, Jeremy Irons, who acted in the play The Real Thing, said that Nichols creates a very "protective environment: he makes you feel he's only there for you," while Ann-Margret, for her role in Carnal Knowledge, felt the same: "What's wonderful about Mike is that he makes you feel like you're the one that's come up with the idea, when it's actually his."

== Personal life ==
Nichols was married four times; the first three ended in divorce, the last upon his death.

Nichols's first marriage was to Patricia Scot; they were married from 1957 to 1960. His second was to Margot Callas, a former "muse" of the poet Robert Graves, from 1963 to 1974. The couple had a daughter together. His third marriage, in 1975, to Annabel Davis-Goff, produced two children; it ended in divorce in 1986. His fourth was to former Good Morning America and ABC World News anchor Diane Sawyer, whom he married on April 29, 1988. None of his wives were Jewish and his children were not brought up according to a religion, but they identify as Jewish.

Nichols had a lifelong interest in Arabian horses. From 1968 to 2004, he owned a farm in Connecticut and was a noted horse breeder. He also imported quality Arabian horses from Janów Podlaski Stud Farm in Poland, some of which sold for record-setting prices. While in high school, Nichols had been an instructor at the Claremont Riding Academy in Manhattan's Upper West Side and also had "ridden in horse shows in Chicago."

In 2009, Nichols signed a petition in support of releasing director Roman Polanski, who had been detained while traveling to a film festival in relation to his 1977 sexual abuse charges, which the petition argued would undermine the tradition of film festivals as a place for works to be shown "freely and safely", and that arresting filmmakers traveling to neutral countries could open the door "for actions of which no-one can know the effects."}

== Death and legacy ==
Nichols died of a heart attack on November 19, 2014, at his apartment in Manhattan. During the 87th annual Academy Awards on February 22, 2015, Nichols was featured in the In Memoriam segment, in anchor position. Nichols left John Frederick Herring Sr.'s painting "Horse with Groom" to his son Max.

When Nichols died, many celebrities paid tribute to him, including Whoopi Goldberg, Steven Spielberg, Tom Hanks, Meryl Streep, Kevin Spacey and Tom Stoppard. On November 8, 2015, stars and artists gathered at New York's IAC Building to pay tribute to Nichols. Hosts for the private event included Elaine May and Lorne Michaels. Eric Idle and John Cleese performed. Guests included Streep, Robert De Niro, Al Pacino, Natalie Portman, Carly Simon, Nathan Lane and Christine Baranski.

In 2017, during an Oscars Actress Roundtable with The Hollywood Reporter, Amy Adams, Natalie Portman, and Annette Bening spoke about the effect Nichols had on their lives. In 2020 Woody Allen described Nichols as "maybe the best comedy director ever on the stage."

== Filmography and theatre credits ==
Directed features
Year	Title	Distribution
1966	Who's Afraid of Virginia Woolf?	Warner Bros.
1967	The Graduate	Embassy Pictures
1970	Catch-22	Paramount Pictures
1971	Carnal Knowledge	Embassy Pictures
1973	The Day of the Dolphin	Embassy Pictures
1975	The Fortune	Columbia Pictures
1980	Gilda Live	Warner Bros.
1983	Silkwood	20th Century Fox
1986	Heartburn	Paramount Pictures
1988	Biloxi Blues	Universal Pictures
1988	Working Girl	20th Century Fox
1990	Postcards from the Edge	Columbia Pictures
1991	Regarding Henry	Paramount Pictures
1994	Wolf	Columbia Pictures
1996	The Birdcage	Metro-Goldwyn-Mayer
1998	Primary Colors	Universal Pictures
2000	What Planet Are You From?	Sony Pictures Releasing
2004	Closer	Sony Pictures Releasing
2007	Charlie Wilson's War	Universal Pictures

== Discography ==
- Improvisations to Music (1958) Mercury ASIN B000W0V9BW
- An Evening with Mike Nichols and Elaine May (1960) Mercury ASIN B000W06CCS
- Mike Nichols & Elaine May Examine Doctors (1961) Mercury MG 20680/SR 60680 ASIN B000W0AGDY
- In Retrospect (1962) Universal Music Group, compilation, re-released as compact disc in 1996 ASIN B000001EKT

== Awards and honors ==
Nichols is one of the few entertainers to have won the EGOT, the Emmy, Grammy, Oscar, and Tony.

Nichols received five Academy Award nominations, winning Best Director for The Graduate (1967). He was also nominated for his work on Who's Afraid of Virginia Woolf? (1966), Silkwood (1983), Working Girl (1988) and for producing The Remains of the Day (1993). For his collaborations with Elaine May, Nichols was nominated for three Grammy Awards winning for Best Comedy Album in 1962. Nichols, also known for his extensive work on Broadway, received 16 Tony Award nominations, winning eight times for Barefoot in the Park (1964), Luv/The Odd Couple (1965), Plaza Suite (1968), The Prisoner of Second Avenue (1972), Annie (1977), The Real Thing (1984), Monty Python's Spamalot (2005), and Death of a Salesman (2012). Nichols also received Primetime Emmy Awards for directing and producing the HBO television film Wit (2001) and miniseries Angels in America (2003).

In 1989 Nichols was presented the Golden Plate Award of the American Academy of Achievement by Awards Council member Diane Sawyer. He also received a Gala tribute from Film Society of Lincoln Center in 1999. In 2001, he received the Peabody Award for his HBO television film Wit which starred Emma Thompson. In 2003 he was awarded with the Kennedy Center Honors where he was honored by Elaine May, Meryl Streep, Candice Bergen, and Tom Stoppard. In 2010 he was honored with the American Film Institute Lifetime Achievement Award where he was honored by Elaine May, Nora Ephron, Meryl Streep, Emma Thompson, Julia Roberts, Candice Bergen, Jack Nicholson, Dustin Hoffman, Tom Hanks, Robin Williams, Harrison Ford, and Shirley MacLaine.

Awards and nominations received by Nichols's films
Year	Title	Academy Awards		BAFTA Awards		Golden Globe Awards	
Year	Title	Nominations	Wins	Nominations	Wins	Nominations	Wins
1966	Who's Afraid of Virginia Woolf?	13	5	3	3	7	
1967	The Graduate	7	1	7	5	7	5
1970	Catch-22			2			
1971	Carnal Knowledge	1				3	1
1973	The Day of the Dolphin	2				1	
1975	The Fortune					1	
1983	Silkwood	5		2		5	1
1988	Working Girl	6	1	3		6	4
1990	Postcards from the Edge	2		3		3	
1996	The Birdcage	1				2	
1998	Primary Colors	2		3	1	2	
2001	Wit					2	
2003	Angels in America					7	5
2004	Closer	2		3	1	5	2
2007	Charlie Wilson's War	1		1		5	
Total		43	7	27	10	56	17

=== Direction for Oscar-related performances ===
Nichols has directed multiple Oscar winning and nominated performances.

Year	Performer	Film	Result
Academy Award for Best Actor
1967	Richard Burton	Who's Afraid of Virginia Woolf?	Nominated
1968	Dustin Hoffman	The Graduate	Nominated
Academy Award for Best Actress
1967	Elizabeth Taylor	Who's Afraid of Virginia Woolf?	Won
1968	Anne Bancroft	The Graduate	Nominated
1984	Meryl Streep	Silkwood	Nominated
1989	Melanie Griffith	Working Girl	Nominated
1991	Meryl Streep	Postcards from the Edge	Nominated
Academy Award for Best Supporting Actor
1967	George Segal	Who's Afraid of Virginia Woolf?	Nominated
2005	Clive Owen	Closer	Nominated
2008	Philip Seymour Hoffman	Charlie Wilson's War	Nominated
Academy Award for Best Supporting Actress
1967	Sandy Dennis	Who's Afraid of Virginia Woolf?	Won
1968	Katharine Ross	The Graduate	Nominated
1972	Ann-Margret	Carnal Knowledge	Nominated
1984	Cher	Silkwood	Nominated
1989	Joan Cusack	Working Girl	Nominated
1989	Sigourney Weaver	Working Girl	Nominated
1999	Kathy Bates	Primary Colors	Nominated
2005	Natalie Portman	Closer	Nominated

== See also ==
- Mike Nichols's unrealized projects
- List of atheists in film, radio, television and theater
- List of people who have won Academy, Emmy, Grammy, and Tony Awards

== Bibliography ==
- Carter, Ash; Kashner, Sam (2019). Life Isn't Everything: Mike Nichols, as Remembered by 150 of His Closest Friends. New York: Henry Holt & Company. p. 368. ISBN 9781250112873.
- Harris, Mark (2021). Mike Nichols: A Life (First ed.). New York: Penguin Press. p. 688. ISBN 9780399562242.
- Schuth, H. Wayne (1978). Mike Nichols. Boston: Twayne Publishers. ISBN 9780805792553.
- Stevens, Kyle (2015). Mike Nichols: Sex, Language and the Reinvention of Psychological Realism. Oxford University Press. ISBN 9780199375813.
- Whitehead, J. W. (2014). Mike Nichols and the Cinema of Transformation. Jefferson, North Carolina: McFarland. ISBN 9780786471454.
