= Becoming Mike Nichols =

- Directed by: Douglas McGrath
- Starring: Mike Nichols; Jack O'Brien
- Music by: David Lawrence
- Original language: English

Production
- Producer: Ellin Baumel
- Cinematography: Tim Orr
- Editor: Camilla Toniolo
- Running time: 72 minutes
- Production company: HBO Documentary Films

Original release
- Network: HBO
- Release: February 22, 2016

Becoming Mike Nichols is a 2016 documentary film directed by Douglas McGrath about the life of Mike Nichols. It premiered at the Sundance Film Festival on January 29, 2016, and was later broadcast on HBO on February 22, 2016.

== Participants ==
- Mike Nichols
- Jack O'Brien

== Production ==
The film contains interviews between Jack O'Brien and Mike Nichols filmed in the months before the death of Mike Nichols in 2014. The interviews were held on two nights, one with an audience and one without. Both interviews were held at the Golden Theatre in New York City where An Evening with Mike Nichols and Elaine May premiered 54 years earlier.

== Release ==
The film premiered at the Egyptian Theater on January 29, 2016, as part of the Sundance Film Festival. It was later broadcast on HBO on February 22, 2016.

== Reception ==
Jeremy Kinser of Sundance Institute called it a "thoroughly engaging film" that "explores Nichols unique creative process".

Guy Lodge of Variety called it an "oddly truncated overview of his early career."

Brian Tallerico of RogerEbert.com gave the film two and a half stars, writing that it "falls short of its potential beyond the clearly interesting source of trivia it provides".

Kevin Crust of the Los Angeles Times wrote that "The real value of the documentary from Douglas McGrath lies in charting Nichols’ creative trajectory".

Charles Kaiser of The Guardian called the film a "fitting tribute to a great director".

Todd McCarthy of The Hollywood Reporter called the film "A short, funny and illuminating interview-based documentary that will leave theater and film mavens satisfied and hungry for more."

Brandon Nowalk of The A.V. Club called the film "this year's second best Mike Nichols doc".

John Fink of thefilmstage.com gave the film a B+, calling it "brief and engaging".
