= Douglas McGrath =

American writer, director, and actor (1958–2022)

- Born: Douglas Geoffrey McGrath; February 12, 1958; Midland, Texas, U.S.
- Died: November 3, 2022 (aged 64); New York City, U.S.
- Education: Princeton University
- Occupations: Playwright, director, actor
- Years active: 1980–2022
- Notable work: Bullets Over Broadway; Beautiful: The Carole King Musical
- Spouse: Jane Read Martin
- Children: 1

Douglas Geoffrey McGrath (February 12, 1958 – November 3, 2022) was an American screenwriter, film director, and actor. He received various accolades, including nominations for an Academy Award, BAFTA Award, Tony Award, and Primetime Emmy Award.

McGrath started his career as a writer for Saturday Night Live from 1980 to 1981. He co-wrote with Woody Allen the film Bullets Over Broadway (1994), for which he received a nomination for the Academy Award for Best Original Screenplay as well as BAFTA and Writers Guild of America Award nominations. He then directed such films as Emma (1996), Company Man (2000), Nicholas Nickleby (2002), and Infamous (2006). He also appeared in such films as Quiz Show (1994), The Daytrippers (1996), Happiness (1998), The Insider (1999), and Michael Clayton (2007).

His television appearances included a recurring role as Principal Toby Cook in Lena Dunham's series Girls from 2015 to 2016. He also appeared in the comedy series Crisis in Six Scenes (2016), and the limited series Godless (2017).

McGrath received a nomination for Tony Award for Best Book of a Musical for the Broadway musical Beautiful: The Carole King Musical in 2014. He directed the documentaries His Way (2011) and Becoming Mike Nichols (2016). He wrote political commentary, such as "The Flapjack File", a column for The New Republic, as well as articles for The New Yorker, The New York Times, and Vanity Fair.

== Early life and education ==
Doug McGrath was the son of Beatrice and R. Searle McGrath, an independent oil producer from Midland, Texas. He was an alumnus of Trinity School of Midland, The Choate School, and Princeton University. At Princeton, he was a member of the Princeton Triangle Club and joined its board of directors after graduation.

== Career ==
McGrath started his career as a writer on the sixth season of Saturday Night Live from 1980 to 1981. Fellow writers that season included Brian Doyle-Murray, Mason Williams, and Jean Doumanian. The season was universally panned. McGrath wrote an episode of L.A. Law, titled "One Rat, One Ranger". In 1993, he wrote the screenplay for the 1993 remake of Born Yesterday. The film received mixed reviews with many comparing it to the 1950 film of the same name.

The following year, he started the first of his many collaborations with Woody Allen, co-writing his musical comedy film Bullets Over Broadway. Janet Maslin of The New York Times described the film as "a bright, energetic, sometimes side-splitting comedy with vital matters on its mind, precisely the kind of sharp-edged farce [Allen] has always done best." McGrath along with Allen received the nomination for the Academy Award for Best Original Screenplay. They also received BAFTA Award, Independent Spirit Award, and Writers Guild of America Award nominations. He continued his relationship with Allen acting in several of his films including Celebrity (1998), Small Time Crooks (2000), Hollywood Ending (2002), Café Society (2016), and Rifkin's Festival (2020).

He had additional success as both a writer and director of the film adaptation of Jane Austen's novel Emma (1996). The film gained critical acclaim, and McGrath received a Writers Guild of America Award nomination. During this time, he had supporting roles in Robert Redford's Quiz Show (1994), Greg Mottola's The Daytrippers (1996), Todd Solondz's Happiness (1998), and Michael Mann's The Insider (1999).

McGrath continued his career as a director with the comedy Company Man (2000). He returned to directing with the film adaptation of Charles Dickens' Nicholas Nickleby (2002). Roger Ebert praised McGrath for his adaptation, writing "The movie is jolly and exciting and brimming with life, and wonderfully well-acted." He then directed the film Infamous focusing on the life of Truman Capote. The film instantly drew comparisons to the Bennett Miller film Capote (2005), which was released the previous year. In his review in The New York Times, A.O. Scott called the film "well worth your attention. It is quick-witted, stylish and well acted… warmer and more tender, if also a bit thinner and showier, than Capote… it is in the end more touching than troubling." During this time he appeared in the dramas Michael Clayton (2007), and Solitary Man (2009).

McGrath also was known for his documentaries, including His Way which profiled film producer and talent manager Jerry Weintraub and for Becoming Mike Nichols (2016). In 2011, he directed I Don't Know How She Does It. The film received mixed reviews, and it is considered a box-office bomb. During this time. he had a recurring role as Principal Toby Cook in the series Girls from 2015 to 2016. He also appeared in Woody Allen's series Crisis in Six Scenes (2016) and the limited series Godless (2017).

In 2014, McGrath wrote the book for the Broadway musical Beautiful: The Carole King Musical. The musical received critical acclaim, and McGrath earned a Tony Award for Best Book of a Musical nomination as well Drama Desk Award and Outer Critics Circle Award nominations. In 2022, he wrote his one-man show, Everything's Fine which was directed by John Lithgow and premiered Off-Broadway at the DR2 Theatre. McGrath suffered a heart attack and died during the production's run.

== Personal life and death ==
In 1995, McGrath married Jane Read Martin, a former assistant of Woody Allen and sister of author Ann M. Martin. They had one son.

McGrath died of a heart attack at his office in Manhattan on November 3, 2022, at the age of 64. He had been performing Off-Broadway in his solo autobiographical show Everything's Fine directed by John Lithgow at the Daryl Roth Theatre, a run which was cut short by his death.

== Partial filmography ==
Film

Year	Title	Director	Writer
1993	Born Yesterday	No	Yes
1994	Bullets Over Broadway	No	Yes
1996	Emma	Yes	Yes
2000	Company Man	Yes	Yes
2002	Nicholas Nickleby	Yes	Yes
2006	Infamous	Yes	Yes
2011	I Don't Know How She Does It	Yes	No
2016	Becoming Mike Nichols	Yes	No

Television

Year	Title	Director	Writer	Notes
1980-1981	Saturday Night Live	No	Yes	12 episodes
1989	L.A. Law	No	Yes	Episode "One Rat, One Ranger"
2011	His Way	Yes	No	Documentary film

Play writer

- Checkers (2012) (play about young Richard Nixon)

Musical book writer

- Beautiful: The Carole King Musical (2014) (musical book)

Actor

- Quiz Show (1994) – Snodgrass
- The Daytrippers (1996) – Chap
  - aka En route vers Manhattan
- Prix Fixe (1997) – Bob Waterman
- Happiness (1998) – Tom
- Celebrity (1998) – Bill Gaines
- The Insider (1999) – Private Investigator
- Company Man (2000) – Alan Quimp
- Small Time Crooks (2000) – Frenchy's Lawyer
- Hollywood Ending (2002) – Barbecue Guest
- Michael Clayton (2007) – Jeff Gaffney
- Solitary Man (2009) – Dean Edward Gitleson
- Girls (2015–2016) - Principal Toby Cook
- Café Society (2016) – Norman
- Crisis in Six Scenes (2016) - Doug
- Godless (2017) - Edward Solomon
- Rifkin's Festival (2020) – Gil Brenner

== Awards and nominations ==
Year	Award	Category	Work	Result
1994	Academy Awards	Best Original Screenplay	Bullets Over Broadway	Nominated
1994	BAFTA Award	Best Original Screenplay	Bullets Over Broadway	Nominated
1994	Independent Spirit Award	Best Screenplay	Bullets Over Broadway	Nominated
1994	Writers Guild of America Awards	Best Original Screenplay	Bullets Over Broadway	Nominated
1996	Writers Guild of America Awards	Best Adapted Screenplay	Emma	Nominated
2014	Tony Award	Best Book of a Musical	Beautiful: The Carole King Musical	Nominated
2016	Primetime Emmy Award	Outstanding Documentary or Nonfiction Special	Becoming Mike Nichols	Nominated

== Bibliography ==
=== Books ===
- Flippin, Royce & Douglas McGrath (1981). Save an alligator, shoot a preppie : a terrorist guide. Drawings by Frank Williams. New York: A & W Visual Library.

=== Essays and reporting ===
- McGrath, Douglas (October 10, 2016). "The Pences visit Manhattan". Shouts & Murmurs. The New Yorker. Vol. 92, no. 32. p. 47.
