= His Way (film) =

2011 television documentary film about Jerry Weintraub

- Directed by: Douglas McGrath
- Starring: Jerry Weintraub
- Music by: Rachel Portman
- Country of origin: United States
- Original language: English

Production
- Producers: Graydon Carter; Alan Polsky; Gabe Polsky
- Cinematography: Tim Orr
- Running time: 87 minutes

Original release
- Release: March 4, 2011

His Way is a 2011 television documentary film about Jerry Weintraub, an American film producer and former chairman and CEO of United Artists. The film was directed by Douglas McGrath.

The film features interviews with Weintraub, Jane Morgan, George H. W. Bush, Barbara Bush, George Clooney, Brad Pitt, Julia Roberts, Elliott Gould, Ellen Barkin, James Caan, Matt Damon and Bruce Willis.
