= Nichols and May =

American comedy duo

- An Evening with Mike Nichols and Elaine May, Playbill (1961)
- Notable work: Improvisations to Music (1958) An Evening with Mike Nichols and Elaine May (1960), Mike Nichols & Elaine May Examine Doctors (1961), In Retrospect (1962)

Comedy career
- Years active: 1958–1962, 1971, 1977
- Medium: Television appearances; theatre; audio recordings; literature
- Genres: Satire; American culture; American politics; surreal humour; black comedy; intellectual humor
- Members: Elaine May; Mike Nichols

Nichols and May was an American improvisational comedy duo act developed by Mike Nichols (1931–2014) and Elaine May (born 1932). Their three comedy albums reached the Billboard Top 40 between 1959 and 1962. Many comedians have cited them as key influences in modern comedy. Woody Allen declared, “the two of them came along and elevated comedy to a brand-new level".

== Partnership ==
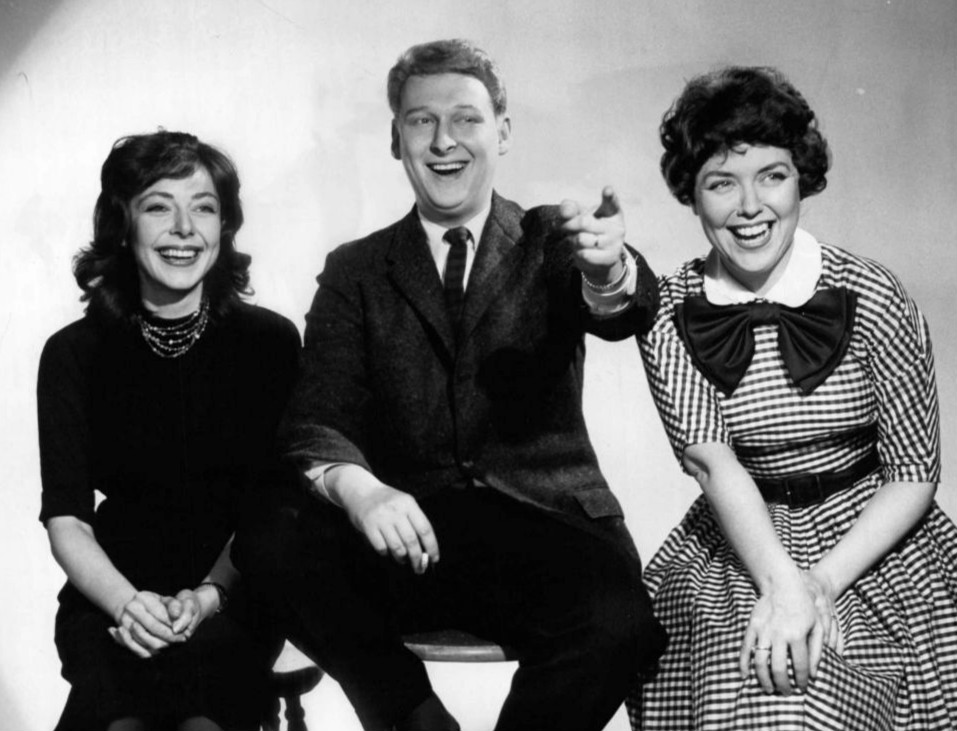
Nichols and May with Dorothy Loudon (r.) in 1959

=== Development ===
Nichols and May met as students at the University of Chicago in the early 1950s. They began their career together at The Compass Players, a predecessor to Chicago's Second City which included Paul Sills, Del Close, Loretta Chiljian, and Nancy Ponder. Nichols dropped out of college in 1953 and moved to New York in 1954 to study acting with Lee Strasberg. May remained in Chicago at Compass, and Nichols returned in 1955. For a short time they worked as a trio with Shelley Berman, but Nichols felt a duo worked better for their style.

Both Nichols and May held various jobs and pursued their craft until 1957, when Compass began an expansion to St. Louis, Missouri. Nichols rejoined the company but was fired in 1958, because May objected to Nichols's treatment of Close, and because the producer suspected Nichols and May were honing an act they planned to take with them. They soon auditioned for agent Jack Rollins in New York, and within weeks they were booked on The Steve Allen Show and Omnibus. Soon they were touring the country and doing voiceover work for ads, most notably a cartoon campaign for Jackson Brewing Company and Narragansett Brewing Company.

=== On Broadway ===
On October 6, 1960, Nichols and May opened on Broadway in An Evening with Mike Nichols and Elaine May at The John Golden Theatre. The show ran for 306 performances, and closed on July 1, 1961.

=== Comedy albums ===
Their 1958 album Improvisations to Music featured the pianist Marty Rubenstein playing improvisations to existing classical and popular songs, as well as original material, with humorous conversations by Nichols and May. Their 1960 album An Evening with Mike Nichols and Elaine May was a recording of their Broadway debut and won a Grammy Award for Best Comedy Performance. Their next album Mike Nichols & Elaine May Examine Doctors was also nominated for a Grammy. Nichols and May grew in fame quickly, and in 1962, for John F. Kennedy's birthday, they performed, alongside Marilyn Monroe. They also recorded a series of short sketches for the radio program Monitor, which were aired over several years in the 1960s.

=== Disbandment ===
The duo discontinued the act in 1961, with each pursuing different careers. Nichols worked as a film and theatre director, and directed such films as Who's Afraid of Virginia Woolf? and The Graduate, for which he won the Academy Award for Best Director. May appears in an uncredited cameo in "The Graduate." May primarily worked as a screenwriter, writing such films as A New Leaf, which she also directed, and Heaven Can Wait.

=== Reunions ===
The duo continued to sporadically reunite after 1961. In the early 1960s they appeared several times on NBC's The Jack Paar Program. The duo reunited in 1972 at New York's Madison Square Garden for the all-star Together For McGovern rally for Senator George McGovern's presidential campaign. They also took the stage at President Jimmy Carter's 1977 inaugural gala. They appeared together in a 1980 stage revival of Who's Afraid of Virginia Woolf? in New Haven, Connecticut. May also wrote the screenplays to The Birdcage (1996) and Primary Colors (1998), both of which Nichols directed.

== Nichols and May: Take Two ==
In 1996, the PBS series American Masters released a 90-minute documentary film on Nichols and May, titled Nichols and May: Take Two on PBS. The documentary was directed by Phillip Schopper, and features several celebrities and entertainers such as Steve Martin, Robin Williams, Richard Lewis, Tom Brokaw, Arthur Penn, Jack Rollins and Steve Allen. The documentary features rare clips of their comedy sketches in which their combination of great comic timing and natural improvisational ability is showcased. Steve Martin observed, "I had never actually heard someone deliver irony just in the tone of their voice." The Chicago Tribune critic noted, "Unlike many films of this kind it understands, too, the importance of including full-length routines, rather than mere snippets." To this date, there remains no DVD or VHS copy available to own.

== Influence and legacy ==
In an interview with Vanity Fair, Nichols and May said their comic heroes were Sid Caesar, Imogene Coca, Lenny Bruce and Mort Sahl.

In Vanity Fair, Woody Allen declared, "Individually, each one is a genius, and when they worked together, the sum was even greater than the combination of the parts—the two of them came along and elevated comedy to a brand-new level".

In Netflix's comedy special Jerry Before Seinfeld, Jerry Seinfeld displayed his personal standup comedy albums he collected as a kid, which include Nichols and May's Improvisations to Music.

In an interview with Pitchfork, standup comedian John Mulaney, described Mike Nichols & Elaine May Examine Doctors (1961) as one of his favorite comedy albums of all time. Mulaney stated, "I got this album for Christmas when I was in junior high. The last track, “Nichols and May at Work,” is an outtake from recording the album, they were just improvising dialog in a studio. They're trying to do a piece where a son goes to his mother and says that he wants to become a registered nurse. It's something you just have to experience, because two people that funny laughing that hard is really, really, really funny. I think it might be the happiest thing ever recorded."

== Discography ==
- Improvisations to Music (1958) Mercury ASIN B000W0V9BW
- An Evening with Mike Nichols and Elaine May (1960) Mercury OCM2200/OCS6200/OCMC2200 ASIN B000W06CCS
- Mike Nichols & Elaine May Examine Doctors (1961) Mercury MG 20680/SR 60680 ASIN B000W0AGDY
- In Retrospect (1962) Polygram, compilation, re-released as compact disc in 1996 ASIN B000001EKT
- The Best of Mike Nichols & Elaine May (1965) Mercury SR60997/MG20997/MG60997/20031MCL, compilation ASIN B004VNGZ88
