= Teach Me! =

- Directed by: Mike Nichols
- Distributed by: Leo-Todd Pictures
- Release date: 1968
- Running time: 20 minutes
- Country: United States
- Language: English

Teach Me! is a 1968 short film (20 minutes) written and directed by Mike Nichols and starring Sandy Dennis.

== Summary ==
A beginning teacher discovers in her first year's experience in a large, inner city high school that the satisfaction and rewards of motivating disadvantaged students outweigh the environmental problems and handicaps.

== See also ==
- List of American films of 1968
