= Regarding Henry =

1991 film by Mike Nichols

- Promotional release poster
- Directed by: Mike Nichols
- Written by: Jeffrey Abrams
- Produced by: Mike Nichols; Scott Rudin
- Starring: Harrison Ford; Annette Bening
- Cinematography: Giuseppe Rotunno
- Edited by: Sam O'Steen
- Music by: Hans Zimmer
- Distributed by: Paramount Pictures
- Release date: July 12, 1991
- Running time: 107 minutes
- Country: United States
- Language: English
- Budget: $25 million
- Box office: $87.9 million

Regarding Henry is a 1991 American drama film directed by Mike Nichols and written by J.J. Abrams. It stars Harrison Ford as a New York City lawyer from a dysfunctional family, who struggles to regain his memory and recover his speech and mobility after he survives a shooting, inadvertently restoring his family's integrity in the process.

The supporting cast includes Annette Bening, Mikki Allen, Bill Nunn, Rebecca Miller, Bruce Altman, and Elizabeth Wilson. Regarding Henry was released by Paramount Pictures on July 12, 1991. The film received mixed reviews, with praise for the cast and Ford's performance but criticism for its perceived sentimentality. It grossed $87.9 million at the box office on a production budget of $25 million.

== Plot ==
Ambitious, callous, narcissistic, and at times unethical, Henry Turner is a wealthy successful Manhattan lawyer whose obsession with his work leaves him little time for his socialite wife, Sarah, and troubled preteen daughter, Rachel. He has just won a malpractice suit, defending a hospital against a plaintiff who claims, but is unable to prove, that he warned doctors about a pre-existing condition.

Running out to a convenience store to buy cigarettes one night, Henry is shot when he interrupts a robbery. One bullet hits his right frontal lobe, while the other hits his left subclavian artery, causing excessive internal bleeding and cardiac arrest. He experiences anoxia, resulting in brain damage.

Henry survives, but can neither move nor talk, and he suffers retrograde amnesia. While in a nursing facility, he slowly regains movement and speech with the help of a physical therapist named Bradley. His recovery creates a financial burden for his family. Upon returning home, he is almost childlike. As he forges new relationships with his family, he realizes he does not like who he once was.

Sarah enrolls Rachel in an out-of-town elite school, though she is now reluctant to go, because she and Henry now have a good relationship. At orientation, Henry tells Rachel a lie to help her adjust to the new school. He and Sarah grow closer, as they were when they first met. Henry also misses Rachel.

Henry's firm allows him to return out of deference to his previous contributions. Sarah suggests they relocate to a smaller, less expensive residence. As his firm essentially assigns him only low-level work, he realizes he no longer wants to be a lawyer. While at a dinner party, they overhear several friends making derogatory comments about him.

While going through his closet, Henry finds a former colleague's letters to Sarah, disclosing they had an affair. He confronts Sarah, and she admits to the brief affair, but reminds him that they had been unhappy in their marriage for a long time. He becomes angry and leaves home, finding himself drawn to the Ritz hotel.

While Henry thinks things over in a room, he hears a knock at the door. It is Linda, a fellow attorney, who has followed him there. She reveals that they had been having an affair, and they had met twice a week in that room. She also says he was going to leave Sarah for her. He does not want to hear it and leaves.

Henry gives the documents that his firm suppressed to the plaintiff that proves their case, and he apologizes. He then resigns from the firm. He realizes that, as Sarah had said, everything had been wrong before, but it is now so much better. They reconcile, then go to Rachel's school to withdraw her. She is overjoyed to go home with them.

== Cast ==
- Harrison Ford as Henry Turner
- Annette Bening as Sarah Turner
- Bill Nunn as Bradley
- Rebecca Miller as Linda
- Bruce Altman as Bruce
- Mikki Allen as Rachel Turner
- Elizabeth Wilson as Jessica
- Donald Moffat as Charlie Cameron
- James Rebhorn as Dr. Sultan
- Robin Bartlett as Phyllis
- John Leguizamo as Convenience Store Robber
- J. J. Abrams as Delivery Boy (as Jeffrey Abrams)

== Production ==
The film was shot on location in New York City, White Plains, and Millbrook.

== Music ==
=== Original soundtrack ===
Regarding Henry: Music From the Motion Picture Soundtrack was released on August 6, 1991, on Capitol Records/EMI Records.

Regarding Henry: Music from the Motion Picture Soundtrack

Soundtrack album by Hans Zimmer
- Released: August 6, 1991
- Recorded: Mid 1990 - Early 1991
- Studios: Media Ventures Studio (Los Angeles, California); Right Track Recording (Manhattan, New York)
- Genres: Film score, instrumental pop, doo-wop, soft rock
- Length: 37:39
- Label: Capitol/EMI
- Producers: Hans Zimmer, Jay Rifkin

==== Track listing ====
1. "Walkin' Talkin' Man"
2. "A Cold Day in NY"
3. "Blowfish"
4. "Ritz"
5. "Henry Vs Henry"
6. "Ritz Part II"
7. "I Don't Like Eggs"
8. "Gotta Get Me Some of That"
9. "Central Park, 6PM"
10. "Buddy Grooves"

==== Personnel ====
- Hans Zimmer: composer, arranger, keyboards, synthesizer, programming (Akai, Yamaha DX Series, Steinberg)
- Kathy Lenski: violin
- Kirke Godfrey: drum programming, percussion
- Bruce Fowler: arranger [strings], percussion
- Kyle Eastwood: bass guitar, synthesized bass
- Walt Fowler: horns
- Bobby McFerrin: background vocals
- Jay Rifkin: recording engineer, mixing engineer
- Mike Stevens, Nico Golfar: assistant recording engineers

== Reception ==
=== Critical reception ===
Initial critical reception was mixed. Vincent Canby of The New York Times described the film as "a sentimental urban fairy tale" that "succeeds neither as an all-out inspirational drama nor as a send-up of American manners."

Roger Ebert of the Chicago Sun-Times rated the film two out of four stars and commented, "There is possibly a good movie to be found somewhere within this story, but Mike Nichols has not found it in Regarding Henry. This is a film of obvious and shallow contrivance, which aims without apology for easy emotional payoffs, and tries to manipulate the audience with plot twists that belong in a sitcom." Ebert also described the way it makes a connection between Ritz Crackers and the Ritz-Carlton hotel (which reveals that Henry's affair had in fact been deeply embedded in his apparently lost memories) as "especially annoying", apparently regarding it as comic.

Rita Kempley of The Washington Post called the film "a tidy parable of '90s sanctimony", while Peter Travers of Rolling Stone described it as a "slick tearjerker" that "has a knack for trivializing the big issues it strenuously raises", although he praised Ford's performance.

Variety gave a positive review, calling the film "a subtle emotional journey impeccably orchestrated by director Mike Nichols and acutely well-acted."

The review aggregator website Rotten Tomatoes reported a 49% approval rating based on 35 reviews, with an average rating of 5.1/10. The site's critics consensus reads, "Although Harrison Ford makes the most of an opportunity to dig into a serious role, Regarding Henry is undermined by cheap sentiment and clichés." On Metacritic, the film has a weighted average score of 47 out of 100 based on 23 critics, indicating "mixed or average reviews". Audiences polled by CinemaScore gave the film an average grade of "A−" on an A+ to F scale.

=== Box office ===
The film opened in 800 theaters in the United States on July 12, 1991, and grossed $6,146,782 on its opening weekend, ranking seventh at the US box office. It eventually grossed $43,001,500 in the United States and Canada. It grossed $44.9 million internationally for a worldwide total of $87.9 million.

=== Accolades ===
The London Film Critics' Circle named Annette Bening Newcomer of the Year for her work in the film, in addition to Guilty by Suspicion, The Grifters, Valmont, and Postcards from the Edge. The film was nominated for the Young Artist Award for Best Family Motion Picture - Drama, and Mikki Allen was nominated Best Young Actress Starring in a Motion Picture.

== Home media ==
The film was released on Region 1 DVD on September 9, 2003. It is in anamorphic widescreen format with audio tracks in English and French and subtitles in English. Australian premium label Imprint Films released the film on Blu-ray in April 2021.

== See also ==
- List of films featuring diabetes
- Memento (film)
- The Vow (2012 film)
