= Jack Rollins (producer) =

American film producer (1915–2015)

- Rollins in 1984
- Born: Jacob Rabinowitz; March 23, 1915; Brooklyn, New York, U.S.
- Died: June 18, 2015 (aged 100); Manhattan, New York, U.S.
- Occupations: Film and television producer and talent manager
- Years active: 1952–2015
- Military career
- Allegiance: United States
- Branch: United States Army
- Service years: World War II
- Rank: Sergeant
- Conflicts: China Burma India Theater

Jack Koeppel Rollins (born Jacob Rabinowitz; March 23, 1915 – June 18, 2015) was an American film and television producer and talent manager of comedians and television personalities. His first major success came in the 1950s when he managed actor and singer Harry Belafonte. Rollins co-wrote the song "Man Piaba" with Belafonte on his debut RCA Victor album Mark Twain and other Folk Favorites, released in 1954. In 1958, he helped create and promote the comedy duo Nichols and May. He went on to help shepherd the careers of several prominent comedians with his partner Charles H. Joffe, beginning in 1960 with Woody Allen and later with Dick Cavett, Billy Crystal, David Letterman, and Robin Williams.

Rollins' work as a film and television producer was closely tied to the artists that he managed. He was credited as an executive producer on many of the films directed by Woody Allen from 1969 to 2015. From 1970 to 1972, he was an executive producer on ABC's The Dick Cavett Show and, from 1982 to 1992, he was an executive producer of the NBC series Late Night with David Letterman. Between the two shows, he was nominated for a Primetime Emmy Award ten times.

== Life and career ==
Born Jacob Rabinowitz in Brooklyn, Rollins was the son of Yiddish-speaking immigrants from Russia. In 1933, he graduated from Thomas Jefferson High School, and in 1937 earned a bachelor's degree from the City College of New York. He spent two years working for an orphanage in Chicago before being drafted into the United States Army during World War II.

Rollins worked as a decoder of communications in India during the war where one of his commanding officers was actor Melvyn Douglas. Rollins assisted Douglas in staging shows and developed a friendship with him. While stationed in India as a sergeant in 1944, he participated in radio programs to entertain troops. After the war, Douglas assisted Rollins in developing the professional contacts he needed to begin working as a producer on Broadway.

Rollins' work as a Broadway producer during the late 1940s and early 1950s proved to be difficult and ultimately unfruitful. He abandoned this pursuit in 1951 when he established a one-man talent agency in Midtown Manhattan. He worked with the then-unknown Harry Belafonte. He later became partners with Charles H. Joffe and they successfully managed the careers of several artists, most of whom were comedians, among them Woody Allen, Dick Cavett, Billy Crystal, Robert Klein, David Letterman, Robin Williams, and the comedy duo Nichols and May. Joffe focused more on Allen, with Rollins focusing on others. He was approached in the early 1960s by legendary comedian Lenny Bruce concerning management and possible representation. According to Rollins' wife, Jane, Rollins declined due to Bruce's personal issues.

In his 2005 Cecil B. DeMille Award acceptance speech, Robin Williams referred to Jack Rollins as 'the most ethical man in show business'.

Rollins was producer for The David Letterman Show (1980) and Late Night with David Letterman from its inception in 1982 until 1992.

Rollins was a close friend of jazz pianist Bill Evans, with whom he owned a racehorse named 'Annie Hall'. Rollins died on June 18, 2015.

== Filmography ==
=== Executive producer ===
Film

Year	Title	Notes
1969	Don't Drink the Water	Director: Howard Morris
1969	Take the Money and Run	Director: Woody Allen
1971	Bananas	Director: Woody Allen
1972	Play It Again, Sam	Director: Herbert Ross
1972	Everything You Always Wanted to Know; About Sex* (*But Were Afraid to Ask)	Director: Woody Allen
1973	Sleeper	Director: Woody Allen
1975	Love and Death	Director: Woody Allen
1976	The Front	Director: Martin Ritt
1977	Annie Hall	Director: Woody Allen
1978	Interiors	Director: Woody Allen
1979	Manhattan	Director: Woody Allen
1980	Stardust Memories	Director: Woody Allen
1982	A Midsummer Night's Sex Comedy	Director: Woody Allen
1983	Zelig	Director: Woody Allen
1984	Broadway Danny Rose	Director: Woody Allen
1985	The Purple Rose of Cairo	Director: Woody Allen
1986	Hannah and Her Sisters	Director: Woody Allen
1987	Radio Days	Director: Woody Allen
1987	September	Director: Woody Allen
1988	Another Woman	Director: Woody Allen
1989	New York Stories	Segment: Oedipus Wrecks
1989	Crimes and Misdemeanors	Director: Woody Allen
1990	Alice	Director: Woody Allen
1991	Shadows and Fog	Director: Woody Allen
1992	Husbands and Wives	Director: Woody Allen
1993	Manhattan Murder Mystery	Director: Woody Allen
1994	Bullets over Broadway	Director: Woody Allen
1995	Mighty Aphrodite	Director: Woody Allen
1996	Everyone Says I Love You	Director: Woody Allen
1997	Deconstructing Harry	Director: Woody Allen
1998	Celebrity	Director: Woody Allen
1999	Sweet and Lowdown	Director: Woody Allen
2000	Small Time Crooks	Director: Woody Allen
2001	The Curse of the Jade Scorpion	Director: Woody Allen
2002	Hollywood Ending	Director: Woody Allen
2003	Anything Else	Director: Woody Allen
2004	Melinda and Melinda	Director: Woody Allen
2005	Match Point	Director: Woody Allen
2006	Scoop	Director: Woody Allen
2007	Cassandra's Dream	Director: Woody Allen
2008	Vicky Cristina Barcelona	Director: Woody Allen
2009	Whatever Works	Director: Woody Allen
2010	You Will Meet a Tall Dark Stranger	Director: Woody Allen
2011	Midnight in Paris	Director: Woody Allen
2012	To Rome with Love	Director: Woody Allen
2013	Blue Jasmine	Director: Woody Allen
2014	Magic in the Moonlight	Director: Woody Allen
2015	Irrational Man	Director: Woody Allen

Television

Year	Title	Notes
1969	The Woody Allen Special	Comedy Special
1969-1971	The Dick Cavett Show	8 episodes
1982	The Marx Brothers in a Nutshell	Television documentary
1982-1992	Late Night with David Letterman	263 episodes
1986	David Letterman's 2nd Annual Holiday Film Festival	Television Special
1988	Late Night with David Letterman: 6th Anniversary Special	Television Special
1989	Late Night with David Letterman: 7th Anniversary Special	Television Special

=== As an actor ===
Year	Title	Role	Notes	Ref.
1980	To Woody Allen from Europe with Love	Himself	Documentary	
1980	Stardust Memories	Studio Executive		
1984	Broadway Danny Rose	Jack Rollins		
1996	Nichols and May: Take Two	Himself	Documentary, PBS	
2004	Funny Already: A History of Jewish Comedy	Himself	TV-Movie documentary	
2011	Woody Allen: A Documentary	Himself	Documentary, PBS	

== Awards and nominations ==
Year	Award	Category	Nominated work	Result	Ref.
1970	Primetime Emmy Award	Outstanding Variety Series	The Dick Cavett Show	Nominated	
1971	Primetime Emmy Award	Outstanding Variety Series - Talk	The Dick Cavett Show	Nominated	
1981	Daytime Emmy Awards	Outstanding Variety Series	The David Letterman Show	Nominated	
1984	Primetime Emmy Award	Outstanding Variety, Music or Comedy Program	Late Night with David Letterman	Nominated	
1985	Primetime Emmy Award	Outstanding Variety, Music or Comedy Program	Late Night with David Letterman	Nominated	
1986	Primetime Emmy Award	Outstanding Variety, Music or Comedy Program	Late Night with David Letterman	Nominated	
1987	Primetime Emmy Award	Outstanding Variety, Music or Comedy Program	Late Night with David Letterman	Nominated	
1988	Primetime Emmy Award	Outstanding Variety, Music or Comedy Program	Late Night with David Letterman	Nominated	
1988	Primetime Emmy Award	Outstanding Variety, Music or Comedy Program	Late Night with David Letterman: The 6th Anniversary Special	Nominated	
1989	Primetime Emmy Award	Outstanding Variety, Music or Comedy Program	Late Night with David Letterman	Nominated	
1990	Primetime Emmy Award	Outstanding Variety, Music or Comedy Program	Late Night with David Letterman	Nominated	
1991	Primetime Emmy Award	Outstanding Variety, Music or Comedy Program	Late Night with David Letterman	Nominated	
1992	Primetime Emmy Award	Outstanding Variety, Music or Comedy Program	Late Night with David Letterman	Nominated	
1994	CableACE Award	Best Stand-Up Comedy Special	Rick Reynolds: Only the Truth Is Funny	Nominated	
