= In Retrospect (Nichols and May album) =

Compilation album by Nichols and May
- Released: 1962
- Recorded: 1962
- Genre: Comedy
- Length: 1:04:50
- Label: Mercury Records

Nichols and May chronology
Mike Nichols & Elaine May Examine Doctors (1961)	In Retrospect (1962)

In Retrospect is the final comedy album by Nichols and May. It is a "best of" compilation album of their first three albums.

== Track listing ==
1. Telephone - 8:13
2. Adultery - 7:52
3. Disc Jockey - 9:06
4. Mother and Son - 6:33
5. A Little More Gauze - 3:34
6. Morning Rounds - 1:42
7. Merry Christmas, Doctor - 3:43
8. Physical - 5:11
9. Cocktail Piano - 4:41
10. Bach to Bach - 5:31
11. Second Piano Concerto (The Dentist) - 5:02
12. Nichols and May at Work - 4:30
