= Mike Nichols & Elaine May Examine Doctors =

Studio album by Nichols and May
- Released: 1961
- Recorded: 1961
- Genre: Comedy
- Length: 34:37
- Label: Mercury Records

Nichols and May chronology
An Evening with Mike Nichols and Elaine May (1960)	Mike Nichols & Elaine May Examine Doctors (1961)	In Retrospect (1962)

Mike Nichols & Elaine May Examine Doctors is a comedy album by Nichols and May.

The ten episodes heard here were originally aired on NBC Radio's Monitor program. The final track is an outtake of Nichols and May improvising.

The track "The Von Brauns at Home", featuring German characters pretending to be Americans, was in the original release but not included in subsequent pressings.

== Track listing ==
1. A Little More Gauze - 3:29
2. Interrupted Hour - 4:35
3. The Von Brauns at Home* - 1:05
4. Merry Christmas, Doctor - 3:38
5. Morning Rounds - 1:57
6. Transference - 2:00
7. Calling Dr. Marx - 2:39
8. Thank You Very Much - 2:34
9. Out of Africa - 2:59
10. Bedside Manner - 1:11
11. Physical - 5:06
12. Nichols and May at Work - 4:29

== Influence ==
In an interview with Pitchfork Magazine, standup comedian John Mulaney described Mike Nichols & Elaine May Examine Doctors (1961) as one of his Favorite Comedy Albums of all time. Mulaney stated, "I got this album for Christmas when I was in junior high. The last track, 'Nichols and May at Work,' is an outtake from recording the album, they were just improvising dialog in a studio. They’re trying to do a piece where a son goes to his mother and says that he wants to become a registered nurse. It’s something you just have to experience, because two people that funny laughing that hard is really, really, really funny. I think it might be the happiest thing ever recorded."

In 2014, John Mulaney tweeted in remembrance when Mike Nichols died: "The last track on Nichols and May Examine Doctors, 'Nichols and May at Work.' The best comedy moment on tape. RIP Mike Nichols."
