= Improvisations to Music =

Studio album by Nichols and May
- Released: December 15, 1958
- Genre: Comedy
- Length: 34:07
- Label: Mercury Records
- Producer: Jack Tracy

Nichols and May chronology
Improvisations to Music (1958)	An Evening with Mike Nichols and Elaine May (1960)

Improvisations to Music is the first comedy album by Nichols and May. It was released on December 15, 1958, by Mercury Records.

The sketches were recorded improvised along with the accompaniment of Marty Rubenstein on piano. The album peaked at 39 on the Billboard 200.

== Track listing ==
1. Cocktail Piano (4:37)
2. Mysterioso (4:38)
3. Second Piano Concerto (The Dentist) (4:57)
4. Everybody's Doing It Now (2:40)
5. Bach to Bach (5:28)
6. Tango (2:28)
7. Sonata for Piano and Celeste (5:37)
8. Chopin (3:42)
