= Who's Afraid of Virginia Woolf? (film) =

1966 film by Mike Nichols

- Theatrical release poster
- Directed by: Mike Nichols
- Screenplay by: Ernest Lehman
- Based on: Who's Afraid of Virginia Woolf? (1962 play) by Edward Albee
- Produced by: Ernest Lehman
- Starring: Elizabeth Taylor; Richard Burton; George Segal; Sandy Dennis
- Cinematography: Haskell Wexler
- Edited by: Sam O'Steen
- Music by: Alex North
- Color process: Black and white
- Distributed by: Warner Bros. Pictures
- Release date: June 21, 1966
- Running time: 132 minutes
- Country: United States
- Language: English
- Budget: $7.5 million
- Box office: $33.7 million

Who's Afraid of Virginia Woolf? is a 1966 American drama film directed by Mike Nichols in his film directorial debut, produced and adapted by Ernest Lehman from Edward Albee's 1962 play. It stars Elizabeth Taylor as Martha, Richard Burton as George, George Segal as Nick, and Sandy Dennis as Honey. The film depicts a late-night gathering at the home of a college professor and his wife.

The film was released by Warner Bros. Pictures on June 21, 1966, and was both a major critical and commercial success. It was nominated for 13 Academy Awards, including Best Picture and Best Director for Mike Nichols. It is one of only three films to be nominated in every possible category at the Academy Awards (the others are Cimarron and Sinners). All four main actors were nominated in their respective acting categories, the first time a film's entire credited cast was nominated.

The film won five Oscars: a second Academy Award for Best Actress for Taylor, Best Supporting Actress for Dennis, Best Cinematography, Best Black and White Art Direction and Best Costume Design.

In 2013, the film was selected by the Library of Congress for preservation in the United States National Film Registry as being "culturally, historically, or aesthetically significant".

== Plot ==
George, an associate professor of history at a small New England college, and his wife Martha, the daughter of the university president, return home drunk from a party. Martha has invited a young married couple she met at the party for a drink. Surmising that the invited husband is the blond, athletic new professor, George is reluctant, but Martha gives him no option.

The guests arrive — Nick, a biology professor, and his wife, Honey — just before 2:30 a.m. As the four drink, Martha and George engage in back and forth scathing verbal abuse in front of Nick and Honey. The younger couple is first embarrassed and later entangled. Martha angers George by telling Honey about their son, who will celebrate his 16th birthday the next day. Martha's divulging of this information sets off another fight between the two and the women leave the room.

Alone with George, Nick confesses that he was attracted to Honey for her family's money and married her only because he mistakenly believed she was pregnant. George describes his own marriage as one of never-ending accommodation and adjustment, then admits he considers Nick a threat. George also tells a story about a boy he grew up with who had accidentally killed his mother and, years later, his father, and lived out his days in a mental hospital. Nick admits that he aims to charm and sleep his way to the top and jokes that Martha would be a good place to start.

When their guests propose leaving, a drunken George insists on driving them home. The four approach a roadhouse, and Honey suggests they stop to dance. While Honey and George watch, Martha suggestively dances with Nick while continually mocking George. George finally unplugs the jukebox and announces the game is over. In response, Martha alludes to George’s having murdered his parents like the protagonist in his unpublished novel, prompting George to physically attack Martha until Nick pulls him away. George comments that since they've already played "humiliate the host", and it’s not yet time for "hump the hostess", they should try playing "get the guests". He adds that he's written a second novel about a teacher and his wife who marry because of her false pregnancy and family money. Honey realizes Nick has told George about their past and runs from the room.

Another argument, in which George warns Martha to stop the verbal attacks and Martha claims that George married her for the verbal sparring, leads to the two declaring “total war”. Martha drives off with Nick and Honey, leaving George to make his way back home on foot. He arrives to see the silhouettes of Martha and Nick together in the bedroom window and Honey distraught in the front yard. Through Honey's drunken babbling, George begins to suspect that her pregnancy was real and had been terminated secretly by abortion. Furthermore, he conjectures that Honey’s regular propensity to vomit, observed by Nick when Honey vomited earlier in the evening, flagged other secretly terminated pregnancies of which Nick remained unaware.

Inside, Martha accuses Nick of being sexually inadequate, which he blames on the large amount of liquor he has consumed. With the quartet together again, Martha and George resume arguing about their son, with each making lurid accusations about how the other negatively affected him. George finally ends the back and forth by dramatically announcing that he has received a telegram saying their son has been killed in a car accident.

As Martha begs George not to "kill" their son, Nick realizes the truth: Martha and George had been unable to have children and filled the void with an imaginary son. George explains that their one mutually agreed upon rule was to never mention the son to anyone else. George "killed" him because Martha broke that rule by mentioning him to Honey, dangerously confusing fantasy and reality. “Get the Guests”, unearthing Honey and Nick’s secrets, has neutralized their ability to gossip.

The young couple departs awkwardly at dawn, leaving George and Martha alone. George starts singing the song "Who's Afraid of Virginia Woolf?", and Martha responds, "I am, George, I am", while the two hold hands.

== Cast ==
The film features only four credited actors (as in the opening credits):

- Elizabeth Taylor as Martha
- Richard Burton as George
- George Segal as Nick
- Sandy Dennis as Honey

== Production ==
=== Development ===
The film's title alludes to the English novelist Virginia Woolf. She died by suicide at age 59 in 1941, leaving a note in which she expressed love for her husband Leonard Woolf and sorrow for the anguish she was causing him. Twenty years later, playwright Edward Albee corresponded with him, asking permission to use his late wife's name in the title of a new play, according to literary critic Leon Edel, an acquaintance of Leonard Woolf. Woolf granted permission, according to Edel.

Albee's 1962 play was filled with dialogue that violated the standard moral guidelines for films at the time, including multiple instances of "goddamn" and "son of a bitch", along with "screw you", "up yours", "monkey nipples" and "hump the hostess". It opened on Broadway during the Cuban Missile Crisis, and audiences who had gone to the theater to forget the threat of nuclear war were shocked by the provocative language and situations that had not been seen before outside of experimental theater.

The immediate reaction of the theater audiences, eventually voiced by critics, had been that Albee had created a play that would be a great success on Broadway, but could never be filmed in its existing form. Neither the audience nor the critics understood how much the Hollywood landscape was changing in the 1960s, and that it could no longer live with any meaningful Production Code. In bringing the play to the screen, Ernest Lehman decided he would not change the dialogue that had shocked veteran theatergoers in New York only four years earlier. Despite serious opposition to this decision, Lehman prevailed.

=== Casting ===
The choice of Elizabeth Taylor—at the time regarded as one of the most beautiful women in the world—to play the frumpy, fifty-ish Martha surprised many, but the actress gained 30 pounds (13.6 kg) for the role. When Warner Bros. head Jack L. Warner approached Albee about buying the film rights for the play, he told Albee that he wanted to cast Bette Davis and James Mason in the roles of Martha and George. In the script, Martha references Davis and quotes her famous "What a dump!" line from the film Beyond the Forest (1949). Albee was delighted by this cast, believing that "James Mason seemed absolutely right...and to watch Bette Davis do that Bette Davis imitation in that first scene—that would have been so wonderful". However, fearing that the talky, character-driven story would land with a resounding thud—and that audiences would grow weary of watching two hours of screaming between a harridan and a wimp—Nichols and Lehman cast stars Elizabeth Taylor and Richard Burton. Edward Albee was surprised by the casting decision, but later stated that Taylor was quite good and Burton was incredible. In the end, though, he still felt that "with Mason and Davis you would have had a less flashy and ultimately deeper film".

=== Filming ===
Filming began on July 26, 1965, and around that time the Catholic Legion of Motion Pictures (formerly the Catholic Legion of Decency), issued a preliminary report announcing that, if what they heard was true, they might have to issue Virginia Woolf with the once-dreaded "condemned" rating, although they promised to wait to see the film. The Motion Picture Association of America (MPAA) followed with an even stronger statement, warning the studio—without promising to wait for a screening—that if they were really thinking of leaving the Broadway play's language intact, they could forget about getting a seal of approval.

Most of the film's exteriors were shot on location at Smith College in Northampton, Massachusetts. Nichols insisted on this for verisimilitude, but later stated that he had made an error, that the location added nothing artistically, and that these scenes could as well have been shot on any soundstage. (Interior scenes indeed were filmed on a soundstage on the Warner Brothers lot in Burbank, California.)

By December 13, 1965, all of the filming had wrapped, both in Northampton, Massachusetts and in Burbank, California.

=== Music ===
The film's music is an original score by Alex North. At the time of the film's release, Warner Bros. Records released a gatefold two-LP record soundtrack album set that included the entire film's dialogue as the "Deluxe Edition Two-Record Set". The music was issued as a one-LP release that featured 11 tracks of North's score.

== Differences from the play ==
The film adaptation differs slightly from the play, which has only four characters. The minor characters of the roadhouse owner, who has only a few lines of dialogue, and his wife, who serves a tray of drinks and leaves silently, were played by the film's gaffer, Frank Flanagan, and his wife, Agnes.

The play is set entirely in Martha and George's house. In the film, one scene takes place at the roadhouse, one in George and Martha's yard, and one in their car. Despite these minor deviations, however, the film is extremely faithful to the play. The filmmakers used the original play as the screenplay and, aside from toning down some of the profanity slightly—Martha's "Screw you!" (which, in the 2005 Broadway revival, is "Fuck you!") becomes "God damn you!"—virtually all of the original dialogue remains intact, although a major monologue by Martha is cut. In the version released in the UK, "Screw you" is kept intact; in an interview at the time of the release, Taylor referred to this phrase as pushing boundaries.

Nick is never referred to or addressed by name during the film or the play.

== Distribution ==
Warner Bros. studio executives sat down to look at a rough cut, without music, and a Life magazine reporter was present. He printed the following quote from one of the studio chiefs: "My God! We've got a seven million dollar dirty movie on our hands!"

The film was considered groundbreaking for having a level of profanity and sexual implication unheard of at that time. Jack Valenti, who had just become president of the MPAA in 1966, had arranged to update the old Production Code. For the film to be released with MPAA approval, Warner Bros. agreed to deletions of certain profanities and to have a special warning placed on all advertisements for the film, indicating adult content. In addition, all contracts with theatres exhibiting the film included a clause to prohibit anyone under 18 from admittance without adult supervision. Even the National Catholic Office for Motion Pictures (NCOMP) refused to "condemn" the film, with the office ruling it "morally unobjectionable for adults, with reservations". This film and Michelangelo Antonioni's Blow-Up (1966) led Valenti to begin work on the MPAA film rating system that went into effect on November 1, 1968. It is also said that Jack L. Warner chose to pay a fine of $5,000 in order to remain as faithful to the play (and its profanity) as possible.

=== Theatrical release ===
Who's Afraid of Virginia Woolf? premiered on June 21, 1966, at the Pantages Theatre in Hollywood. The film went on to become a financial success, earning a North American rental gross of $14.5 million, which made it the third-highest-grossing film of the year.

=== Home media ===
The film was first released on DVD in North America on October 1, 1997. It has since been re-released in a two-disc special edition that was concurrently released across North America and much of Europe. To coincide with the film's 50th anniversary, Warner Archive Collection released a manufacture-on-demand Blu-ray on May 3, 2016, that was sold exclusively to online retailers.

== Critical reception ==
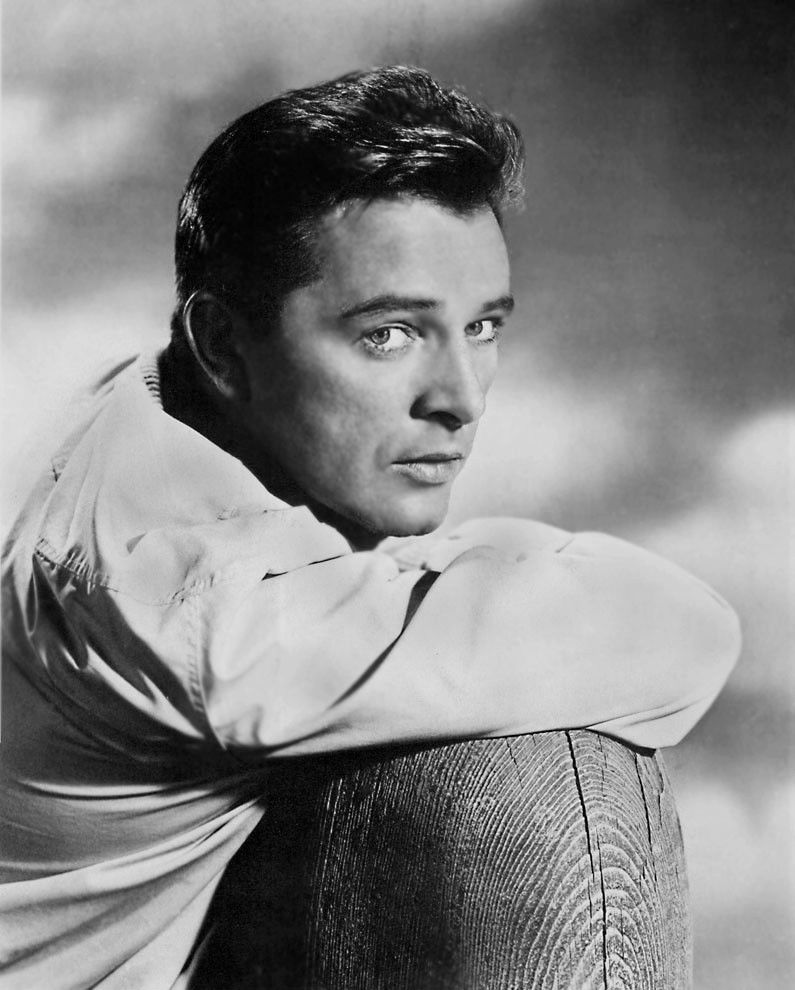
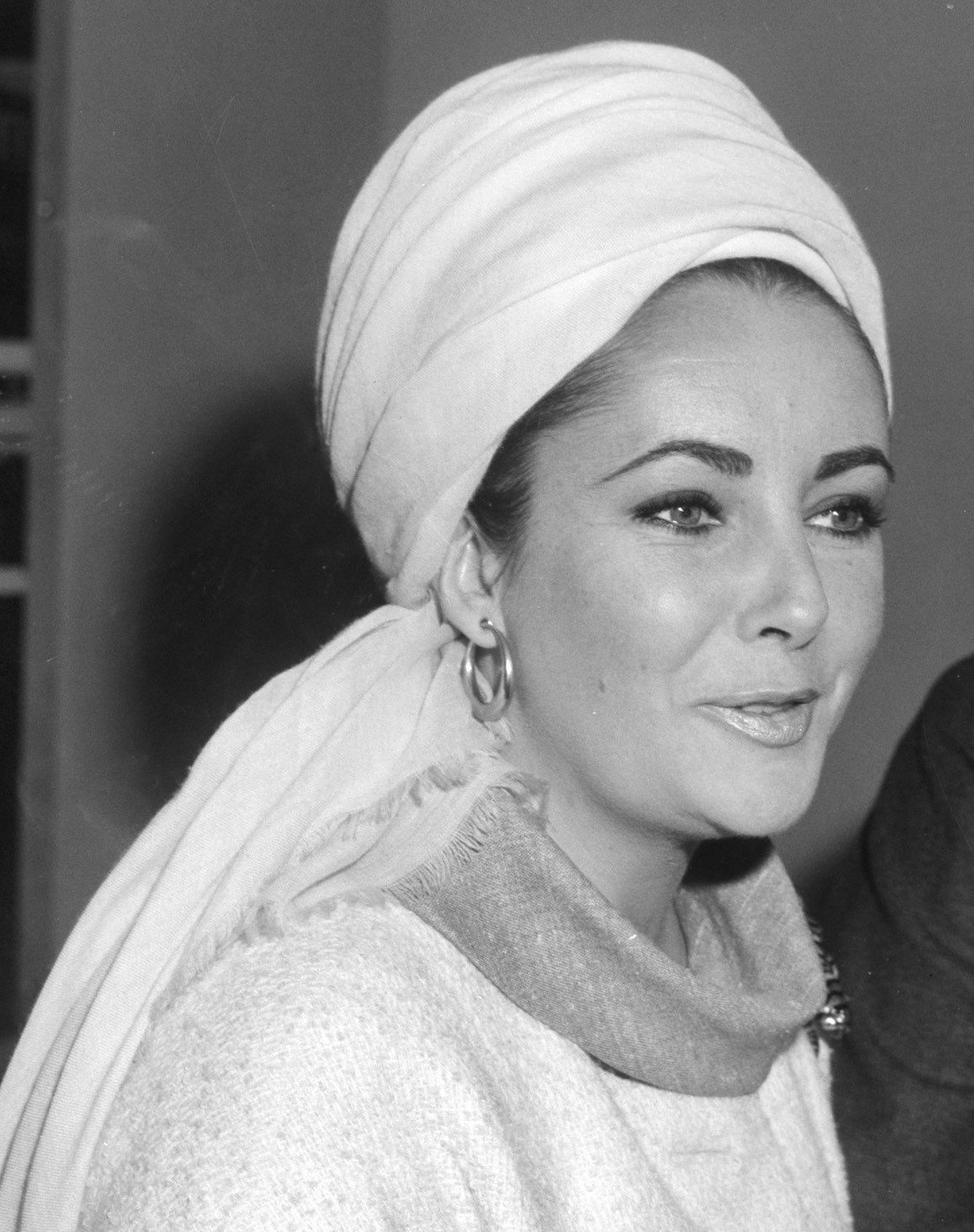
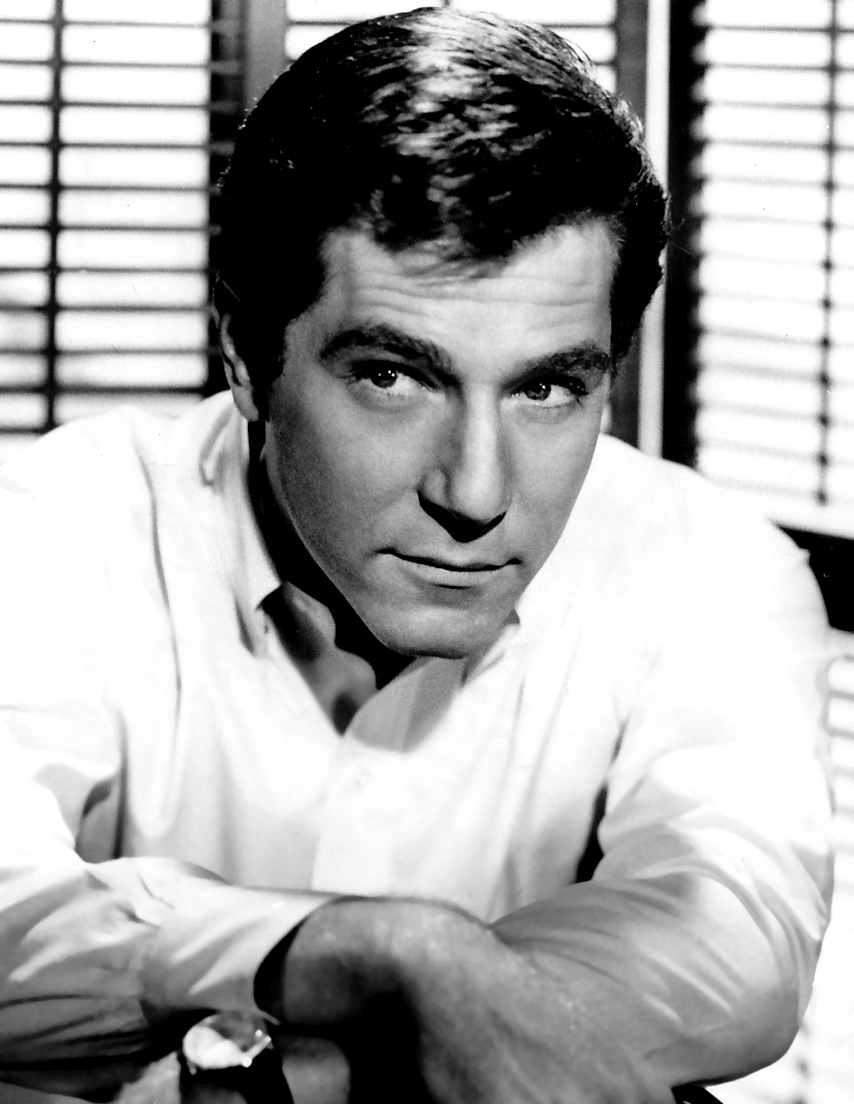
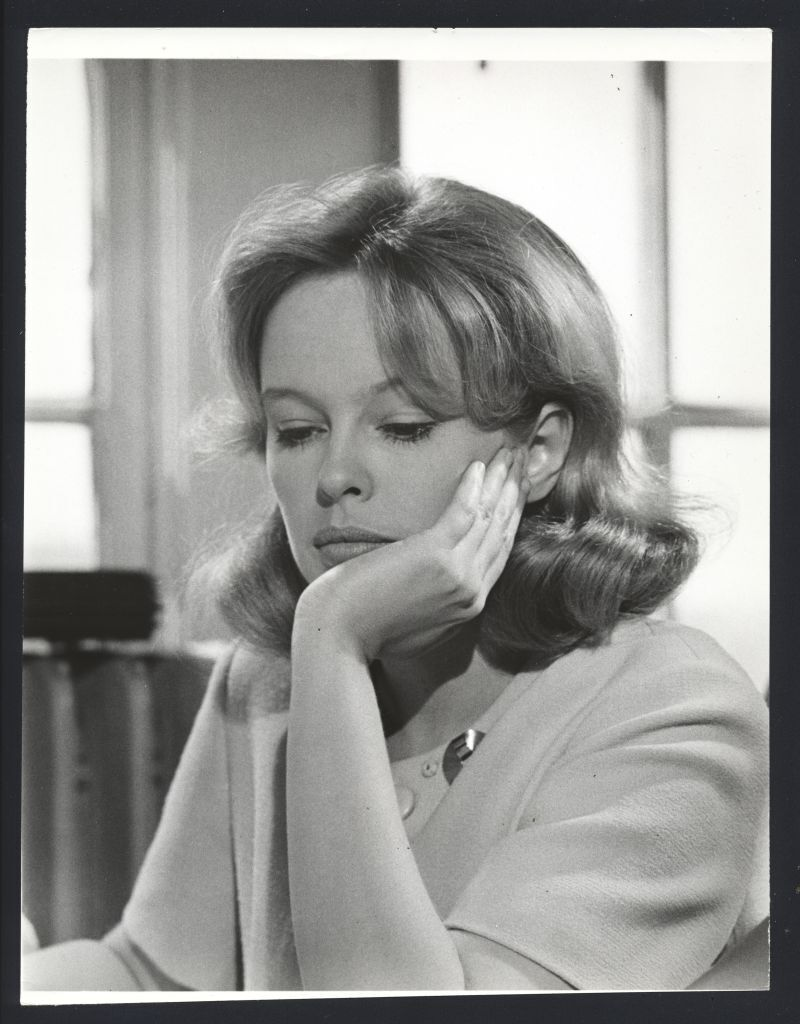
The performances of the entire cast (Richard Burton, Elizabeth Taylor, George Segal and Sandy Dennis) garnered widespread critical acclaim, earning them all Academy Award nominations for Best Actor, Best Actress, Best Supporting Actor and Best Supporting Actress, respectively, with Taylor and Dennis winning in their categories.

Arthur D. Murphy of Variety wrote the film was a "[k]een adaptation and handsome production by Ernest Lehman, outstanding direction by Mike Nichols in his feature debut, and four topflight performances score an artistic bullseye." He praised Taylor's performance, writing that her "characterization is at once sensual, spiteful, cynical, pitiable, loathsome, lustful and tender". James Powers of The Hollywood Reporter wrote the film "is an instant film classic, and Warner Bros. deserves the highest credit for making it a movie without compromise." Powers wrote that Taylor "reaches the fullest of her powers as Martha. The actress' beauty and the richness of her personal life have repeatedly obscured the fact that she can be, when she cares to be, an actress of extraordinary power... Miss Taylor is a prime reason the film seems so very seldom a drama, and almost always a violation of privacy, captured with hidden cameras and microphones." Kate Cameron of the New York Daily News wrote Taylor gave "the outstanding acting role of her career" and was "nothing less than brilliant" as Martha.

Stanley Kauffmann of The New York Times praised Nichols's direction, writing he had "minimized the 'stage' feeling, and he has given the film an insistent presence, good phrasing and a nervous drive. It sags toward the end, but this is because the third act of the play sags." Of Burton's performance, Kauffmann noted he was "utterly convincing as a man with a great lake of nausea in him, on which he sails with regret and compulsive amusement"; he also praised Taylor for delivering "the best work of her career". A review in Time magazine noted Nichols "does more to enrich Virginia Woolf emotionally. Beneath the surface battles of this love-hate saga, he subtly works in evidence of the rough affection between George and Martha, their easy habits of togetherness and mellowed private jokes; and the characters develop more recognizable human frailty than they ever showed on stage."

In his review for The New York Times, Bosley Crowther wrote, "Miss Taylor and Mr. Burton are splendid, providing quite as much as the play permits of sharp psychological dissection of the older, corrosive pair. Perhaps Mr. Nichols's direction allows them to punch too hard at times." He also expressed disappointment that Nichols "was not able to get more from the roles of the other couple, whom George Segal and Sandy Dennis play." Andrew Sarris of The Village Voice felt the "movie isn't all that good, but it's reasonably entertaining and effective within certain limitations, some evitable and some inevitable. Why Jack Warner should be applauded for bringing a Broadway hit to the screen is a bit beyond me."

On the review aggregator website Rotten Tomatoes, the film has an approval rating of 96% based on 45 reviews, with an average rating of 8.80/10. The website's critical consensus reads, "Led by a volcanic performance from Elizabeth Taylor, Who's Afraid of Virginia Woolf? is a scathing adaptation of the Edward Albee play that serves as a brilliant calling card for debuting director Mike Nichols." At Metacritic, which assigns a weighted mean rating to reviews, the film has a score of 75 based on 11 critics, indicating "generally favorable" reviews.

The Japanese filmmaker Akira Kurosawa cited Who's Afraid of Virginia Woolf? as one of his 100 favorite films.

== Accolades ==
The film is one of only three films (together with Cimarron and Sinners) to be nominated in every possible category at the Academy Awards. Each of the four actors was nominated for an Oscar, and Elizabeth Taylor and Sandy Dennis won, for Best Actress and Supporting Actress, respectively. The film also won the Black and White Cinematography award for Haskell Wexler's stark, black-and-white camera work (it was the last film to win before the two cinematography categories were combined into one), Best Costume Design and for Best Art Direction (Richard Sylbert, George James Hopkins). It was the first film to have its entire credited cast be nominated for acting Oscars, a feat only accomplished two other times, with Sleuth in 1972 and Give 'em Hell, Harry! in 1975.

Award	Category	Nominee(s)	Result	Ref.
Academy Awards	Best Picture	Ernest Lehman	Nominated	
Academy Awards	Best Director	Mike Nichols	Nominated	
Academy Awards	Best Actor	Richard Burton	Nominated	
Academy Awards	Best Actress	Elizabeth Taylor	Won	
Academy Awards	Best Supporting Actor	George Segal	Nominated	
Academy Awards	Best Supporting Actress	Sandy Dennis	Won	
Academy Awards	Best Screenplay – Based on Material from Another Medium	Ernest Lehman	Nominated	
Academy Awards	Best Art Direction – Black-and-White	Art Direction: Richard Sylbert; Set Decoration: George James Hopkins	Won	
Academy Awards	Best Cinematography – Black-and-White	Haskell Wexler	Won	
Academy Awards	Best Costume Design – Black-and-White	Irene Sharaff	Won	
Academy Awards	Best Film Editing	Sam O'Steen	Nominated	
Academy Awards	Best Original Music Score	Alex North	Nominated	
Academy Awards	Best Sound	George Groves	Nominated	
American Cinema Editors Awards	Best Edited Feature Film	Sam O'Steen	Nominated	
Bambi Awards	Best Actor – International	Richard Burton	Won	
Bambi Awards	Best Actress – International	Elizabeth Taylor	Won	
British Academy Film Awards	Best Film	Mike Nichols	Won	
British Academy Film Awards	Best British Actor	Richard Burton	Won	
British Academy Film Awards	Best British Actress	Elizabeth Taylor	Won	
Directors Guild of America Awards	Outstanding Directorial Achievement in Motion Pictures	Mike Nichols	Nominated	
Golden Globe Awards	Best Motion Picture – Drama		Nominated	
Golden Globe Awards	Best Actor in a Motion Picture – Drama	Richard Burton	Nominated	
Golden Globe Awards	Best Actress in a Motion Picture – Drama	Elizabeth Taylor	Nominated	
Golden Globe Awards	Best Supporting Actor – Motion Picture	George Segal	Nominated	
Golden Globe Awards	Best Supporting Actress – Motion Picture	Sandy Dennis	Nominated	
Golden Globe Awards	Best Director – Motion Picture	Mike Nichols	Nominated	
Golden Globe Awards	Best Screenplay – Motion Picture	Ernest Lehman	Nominated	
Grammy Awards	Best Original Score Written for a Motion Picture or Television Show	Alex North	Nominated	
Kansas City Film Critics Circle Awards	Best Film		Nominated	
Kansas City Film Critics Circle Awards	Best Actress	Elizabeth Taylor	Won	
Laurel Awards	Top Drama		Won	
Laurel Awards	Top Male Dramatic Performance	Richard Burton	Won	
Laurel Awards	Top Female Dramatic Performance	Elizabeth Taylor	Won	
Laurel Awards	Top Male Supporting Performance	George Segal	Nominated	
Laurel Awards	Top Female Supporting Performance	Sandy Dennis	Won	
National Board of Review Awards	Top Ten Films		4th Place	
National Board of Review Awards	Best Actress	Elizabeth Taylor	Won	
National Film Preservation Board	National Film Registry		Inducted	
National Society of Film Critics Awards	Best Film		Nominated	
National Society of Film Critics Awards	Best Actor	Richard Burton	2nd Place	
New York Film Critics Circle Awards	Best Film		Nominated	
New York Film Critics Circle Awards	Best Actor	Richard Burton	Nominated	
New York Film Critics Circle Awards	Best Actress	Elizabeth Taylor	Won (Note: Tied with Lynn Redgrave for Georgy Girl.)	
Online Film & Television Association Awards	Hall of Fame – Motion Picture		Inducted	
Writers Guild of America Awards	Best Written American Drama	Ernest Lehman	Won	

In AFI's 100 Years...100 Movies (10th Anniversary Edition), Who's Afraid of Virginia Woolf? ranked No. 67.

In 2013, the film was selected for preservation in the United States National Film Registry by the Library of Congress as being "culturally, historically, or aesthetically significant".

The February 2020 issue of New York Magazine lists Who's Afraid of Virginia Woolf? as among "The Best Movies That Lost Best Picture at the Oscars."

Paul Mavis of DVD Talk, reviewing Warner Bros.'s 2006 Elizabeth Taylor and Richard Burton: The Film Collection disc release of Who's Afraid of Virginia Woolf?, wrote, "Who's Afraid of Virginia Woolf? exists now as one of the seminal dramas of the modern screen. And its existence counterbalances every gauche public display the Burtons perpetrated, every ream of wasted newsprint devoted to their sometimes silly, outsized lives, and every mediocre film they made before and after its production. It is the peak of their collective and individual careers. And they would never recover from it."

== See also ==
- List of American films of 1966
- List of films with all four Academy Award acting nominations
