= An Evening with Mike Nichols and Elaine May =

Live album by Nichols and May
- Released: 1960
- Recorded: 1960
- Genre: Comedy
- Length: 31:29
- Label: Mercury Records
- Producer: Arthur Penn

Nichols and May chronology
Improvisations to Music (1959)	An Evening with Mike Nichols and Elaine May (1960)	Mike Nichols & Elaine May Examine Doctors (1961)

An Evening with Mike Nichols and Elaine May is a live comedy album by Nichols and May.

The album features selected pieces from the Broadway presentation of An Evening with Mike Nichols and Elaine May. The show opened October 8, 1960, in the Golden Theatre and was a smash with reviewers and audiences.

It peaked at 10 on the Billboard 200 and won the Grammy Award in 1962 for Best Comedy Performance Single or Album, Spoken or Musical.

== Track listing ==
1. Telephone - 8:10
2. Adultery - 7:47
3. Disc Jockey - 9:02
4. Mother and Son - 6:30
