= List of awards and nominations received by Elaine May =

List of accolades received by Elaine May
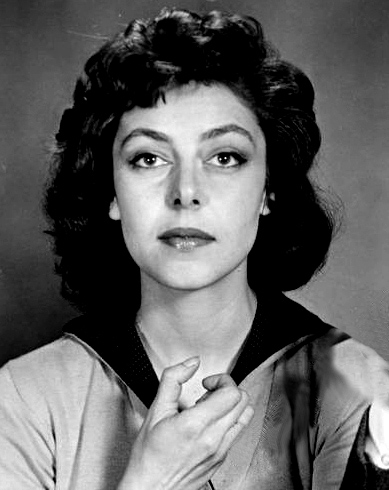
- May in 1959
Accolades
Award	Wins	Nominations
Academy Awards	1	3
BAFTA Film Awards	1	1
Golden Globes	0	1
Grammy Awards	1	4
Tony Awards	1	41

Totals (Note: Certain award groups do not simply award one winner. They acknowledge several different recipients, have runners-up, and have third place. Since this is a specific recognition and is different from losing an award, runner-up mentions are considered wins in this award tally. For simplification and to avoid errors, each award in this list has been presumed to have had a prior nomination.)
- Wins: 15
- Nominations: 29

Elaine May is an American comedian, writer, director, producer and actor. Known for her work on stage and screen she has received various accolades including a British Academy Film Award, a Grammy Award, a Tony Award, and a Writers Guild of America Award as well as nominations for a competitive Academy Award and Golden Globe Award. She has received several honors including the National Medal of Arts in 2013, the Laurel Award for Screenwriting Achievement in 2016, and the Academy Honorary Award in 2021.

May began her career as a improvisational comedian where she was a founding member of the Compass Players. She often collaborated with Mike Nichols during the 1960s and together, they performed onstage from clubs in Greenwich Village to the Broadway stage. They released several comedy albums and won the Grammy Award for Best Comedy Album for An Evening with Mike Nichols and Elaine May (1962). They were also Grammy-nominated for their comedy albums Improvisations to Music (1958) and Mike Nichols & Elaine May Examine Doctors (1961).

On film, she started her career as a comedic actress in a string of films including her black comedy film A New Leaf (1971) for which she was nominated for the Golden Globe Award for Best Actress in a Motion Picture – Musical or Comedy. She expanded her career as a writer and director and later received two Academy Award for Best Adapted Screenplay nominations for her work on Warren Beatty's fantasy comedy-drama Heaven Can Wait (1978) and Mike Nichols' political satire Primary Colors (1998), the later of which earned the BAFTA Award for Best Adapted Screenplay. She received the Laurel Award for Screenwriting Achievement in 2016 and the Academy Honorary Award in 2021.

On the Broadway stage, she portrayed an elderly woman with dementia in the revival of the Kenneth Lonergan memory play The Waverly Gallery (2019) for which she earned the Tony Award for Best Actress in a Play and the Drama Desk Award for Outstanding Actress in a Play as well as a nomination for the Drama League Distinguished Performance Award. As a playwright and director, she previously won the Drama Desk Award for Most Promising Playwright and two Outer Critics Circle Awards for Special Theatrical Production and Best Direction for her play Adaptation (1969).

She was honored with the National Medal of Arts in 2013 from President Barack Obama in a ceremony in The White House. She was awarded for her "groundbreaking wit and a keen understanding of how humor can illuminate our lives, Ms. May has evoked untold joy, challenged expectations, and elevated spirits across our Nation." May was awarded the In 2019, May's film A New Leaf was selected by the Library of Congress for preservation in the United States National Film Registry for being "culturally, historically, or aesthetically significant".

== Major associations ==
=== Academy Awards ===
Year	Category	Nominated work	Result	Ref.
1978	Best Adapted Screenplay	Heaven Can Wait	Nominated	
1998	Best Adapted Screenplay	Primary Colors	Nominated	
2021	Academy Honorary Award	—N/a	Honored	

=== BAFTA Awards ===
Year	Category	Nominated work	Result	Ref.
British Academy Film Awards
1999	Best Adapted Screenplay	Primary Colors	Won	

=== Golden Globe Awards ===
Year	Category	Nominated work	Result	Ref.
1971	Best Actress – Comedy or Musical	A New Leaf	Nominated	

=== Grammy Awards ===
Year	Category	Nominated work	Result	Ref.
1959	Best Performance, Documentary or Spoken Word	Improvisations to Music	Nominated	
1959	Best Comedy Album	Improvisations to Music	Nominated	
1962	Best Comedy Album	An Evening with Mike Nichols and Elaine May	Won	
1963	Best Comedy Album	Mike Nichols & Elaine May Examine Doctors	Nominated	

=== Tony Awards ===
Year	Category	Nominated work	Result	Ref.
2019	Best Actress in a Play	The Waverly Gallery	Won	

== Miscellaneous awards ==
Award	Year	Category	Nominated work	Result	Ref.
Chlotrudis Society	2001	Best Supporting Actress	Small Time Crooks	Nominated	
National Society of Film Critics	2000	Best Supporting Actress	Small Time Crooks	Won	
Online Film Critics Society	1998	Best Adapted Screenplay	Primary Colors	Nominated	
Online Film Critics Society	2000	Best Supporting Actress	Small Time Crooks	Nominated	
Saturn Awards	1978	Best Writing	Heaven Can Wait (shared with Warren Beatty)	Won	
USC Scripter Awards	1999	Primary Colors (based on the novel Primary Colors)	Elaine May (screenwriter), Joe Klein (author)	Nominated	
Writers Guild of America	1971	Best Adapted Comedy	A New Leaf	Nominated	
Writers Guild of America	1978	Best Adapted Comedy	Heaven Can Wait (shared with Warren Beatty)	Won	
Writers Guild of America	1996	Best Adapted Screenplay	The Birdcage	Nominated	
Writers Guild of America	1998	Best Adapted Screenplay	Primary Colors	Nominated	

== Theatre awards ==
Award	Year	Category	Nominated work	Result	Ref.
Drama Desk Award	1969	Most Promising Playwright	Adaptation	Won	
Drama Desk Award	2019	Outstanding Actress in a Play	The Waverly Gallery	Won	
Drama League Award	2019	Distinguished Performance Award	The Waverly Gallery	Nominated	
Outer Critics Circle Award	1969	Special Theatrical Award	Adaptation / Next	Won	
Outer Critics Circle Award	1969	Outstanding Direction of a Play	Adaptation / Next	Won	
Outer Critics Circle Award	2019	Outstanding Actress in a Play	The Waverly Gallery	Won	

== Honorary awards ==
Organizations	Year	Award	Result	Ref.
Academy of Motion Picture Arts and Sciences	2021	Academy Honorary Award	Honored	
American Comedy Awards	1994	Lifetime Achievement Award	Honored	
Los Angeles Film Critics Association	2019	Career Achievement Award	Honored	
President Barack Obama	2013	National Medal of Arts	Honored	
Writers Guild of America Awards	2016	Laurel Screenwriting Award	Honored	
