= Mikey and Nicky =

1976 American neo-noir film

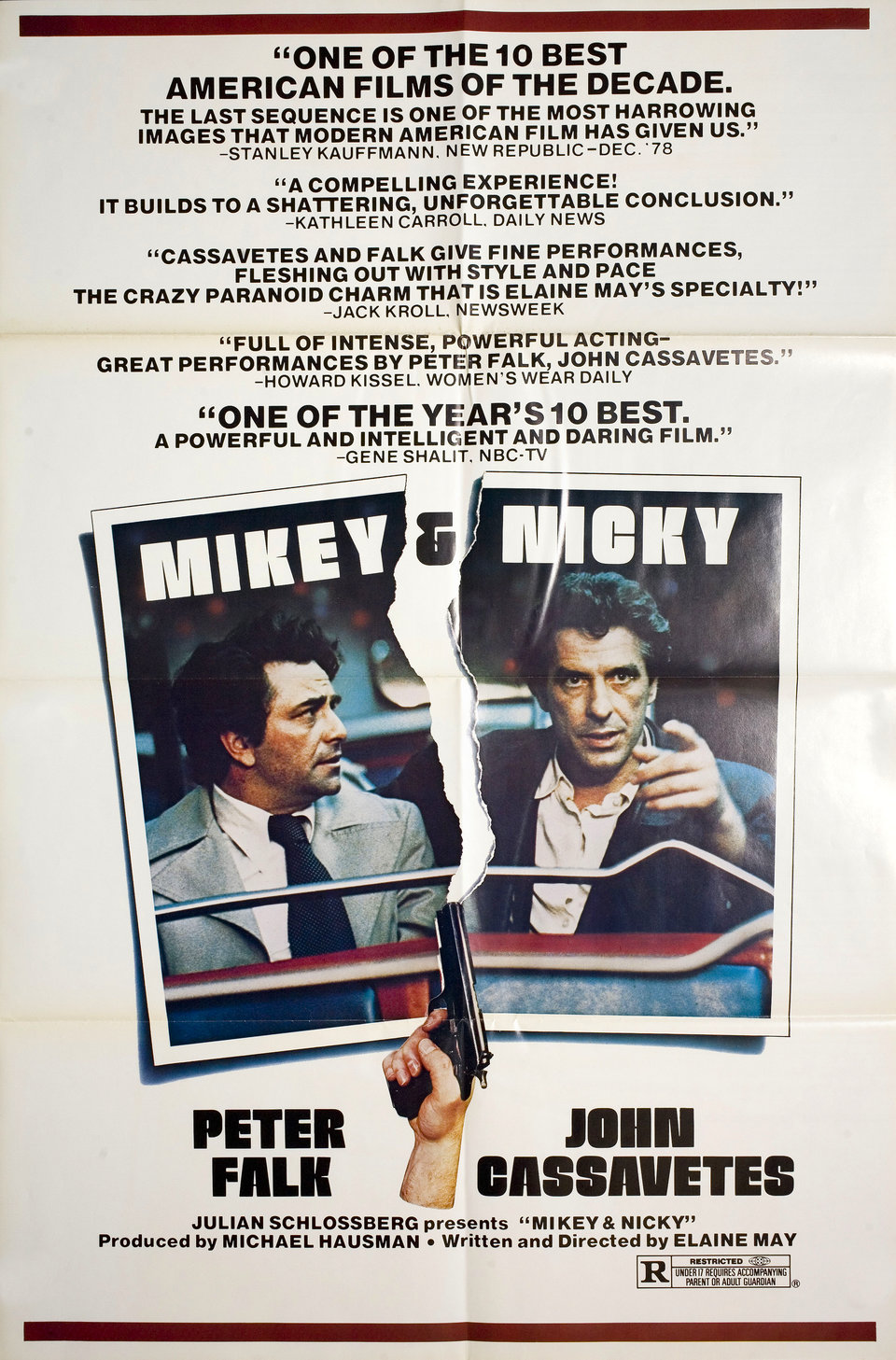
- Theatrical release poster
- Directed by: Elaine May
- Written by: Elaine May
- Produced by: Michael Hausman
- Starring: Peter Falk; John Cassavetes
- Cinematography: Bernie Abramson; Lucien Ballard; Victor J. Kemper
- Edited by: John Carter; Sheldon Kahn
- Music by: John Strauss
- Production company: Castle Hill Productions
- Distributed by: Paramount Pictures
- Release date: December 21, 1976
- Running time: 106 minutes
- Country: United States
- Language: English
- Budget: $4.3 million

Mikey and Nicky is a 1976 American crime drama film written and directed by Elaine May. It stars John Cassavetes as desperate small-time Philadelphia mobster Nicky Godolin and Peter Falk as his longtime friend Mikey Mittner. The supporting cast features Ned Beatty, Carol Grace, Rose Arrick and noted acting teacher Sanford Meisner.

The production ran over its schedule and budget, leading to tensions between May and Paramount Pictures, who revoked her final cut privilege. When finally released on December 21, 1976, the film bombed at the box office, which led to May not directing again for a decade. Her director's cut of the film was screened in 1978, and remastered and released by the Criterion Collection in 2019.

== Plot ==
Holed up in a cheap hotel room in Philadelphia, local gangster Nicky Godolin phones his Jewish-American childhood friend, Mikey Mittner. At the hotel, Nicky tells Mikey that there is a contract for his life because he stole money from his boss, a mobster named Dave Resnick. Mikey helps Nicky by feeding him antacid tablets and buying him milk to help treat Nicky’s ulcers. Mikey starts to help Nicky plan his escape out of Philadelphia, but their travel plans stall.

Nicky and Mikey head to the local bar. A contract killer named Warren Kinney, who Resnick has hired, gets a call from Mikey, revealing Mikey as the one who is assisting the assassination. Nicky suggests leaving the tavern to find female companions as dates but Mikey insists on finishing his beer to stall. Nicky agitatedly leaves the bar anyways, suggesting they go to meet a woman. Mikey agrees, but not before calling his wife Annie on the phone to tell her he will be home late. Meanwhile, Kinney follows Nicky and Mikey, but he is unable to track their whereabouts, calling Annie to find where the duo is going next. Mikey and Nicky visit a predominantly African-American bar so Mikey can call Annie, but leave after Nicky attempts to instigate a fight. Nicky proposes they go to a late-night movie theater, but while taking a city bus to the theater, Nicky assaults the driver.

Mikey and Nicky get off the bus a few stops before the theater and enter a graveyard. They find the gravestone of Nicky's mother, and they discuss intimate shared childhood memories. It is revealed that Mikey and Nicky have had many interpersonal conflicts throughout the years. The two men travel to the home of Nellie, a woman Nicky has been having an affair with. Nicky has sex with her while Mikey is in the room. Upon Nicky's suggestion that Nellie is a prostitute, Mikey also attempts to have sex with Nellie, but she bites Mikey's lip, causing Mikey to slap her.

Embarrassed, Mikey blames Nicky for Nellie's rejection and the two men fight in the street. Nicky slams Mikey's wristwatch, a gift from his father, on the ground and breaks it. Mikey says he no longer wants to be friends, and the two men part ways acrimoniously. Mikey meets Kinney in Kinney’s car at the late-night theater, who has been there for hours waiting to assassinate Nicky. They search the streets for Nicky but cannot locate him. At the same time, Nicky goes back to meet with Nellie. Resnick tells Mikey to go home and instructs Kinney to patrol the block surrounding Mikey's house in case Nicky goes there to make amends.

While at home, Mikey shares with Annie that he believes his late brother, who died at ten years old from scarlet fever, was only given his father’s watch because his brother would soon die. Nicky eventually shows up to the house early in the morning, and demands to be let inside. Mikey instructs Annie to tell Nicky that he's not home, pushing furniture against the door to prevent Nicky from entering. Kinney pulls up and shoots Nicky dead.

== Cast ==
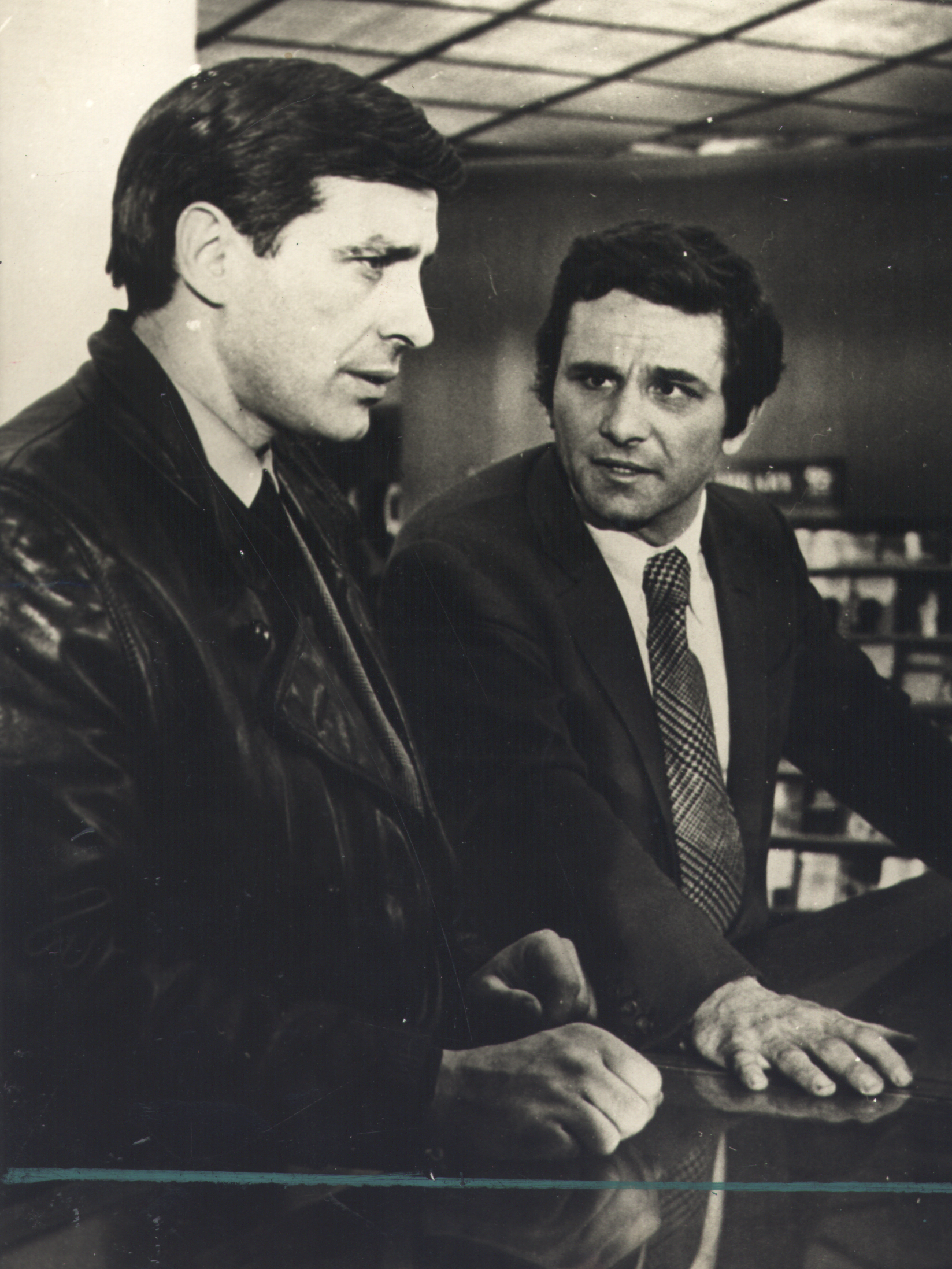
Lead actors John Cassavetes (left) and Peter Falk (right) in 1971

- Peter Falk as Mikey Mittner
- John Cassavetes as Nicky Godolin
- Ned Beatty as Warren Kinney
- Rose Arrick as Annie Mittner
- Carol Grace as Nellie
- William Hickey as Sid Fine
- Sanford Meisner as Dave Resnick
- Joyce Van Patten as Jan Godolin
- M. Emmet Walsh as Bus Driver

== Production ==
The film's original $1.6 million budget grew to $2.2 million, causing original producers Palomar Pictures and distributor Twentieth Century-Fox Film Corporation to drop the project. Elaine May had agreed to deduct any over-budget costs from her salary in exchange for final cut privilege. Paramount picked up the film, with studio president Frank Yablans forming "an ironclad deal" with May for a $1.8 million budget; the agreement also stipulated that the completed film must be delivered to the studio no later than June 1, 1974. May originally cast Yablans as a gangster, but Charles Bluhdorn, the chairman of parent company Gulf+Western, was not amused, and demanded that she recast. Principal photography (which took place at night) began in Philadelphia in May 1973, lasting through August, and continued in Los Angeles from January to March 1974.

The shoot lasted 110 days of filming in both Philadelphia and Los Angeles, leading towards 1.5 million feet of film being used, almost three times as much as was shot for Gone with the Wind. The film was prolonged further with nearly 2 years of editing due to lawsuits between May and Paramount. By using three cameras that she sometimes left running for hours, May captured spontaneous interaction between Peter Falk and John Cassavetes. At one point, Cassavetes and Falk had both left the set and the cameras remained rolling for several minutes. A new camera operator said "Cut!" only to be immediately rebuked by May for usurping what is traditionally a director's command. He protested that the two actors had left the set. "Yes", replied May, "but they might come back". By the time production wrapped, the budget had grown to nearly $4.3 million. Due to May missing the film's delivery date, litigation between her and Paramount began in 1975, with the studio gaining possession of the film and negating May's final cut privilege.

=== Post-production ===
When Paramount assumed control over Mikey and Nicky, May, who had unsuccessfully sued the studio once before to have her name removed from A New Leaf after being unhappy with their cut, hid two important reels of footage in her husband's friend's garage in Connecticut. Although Paramount traced the reels to the garage, the company had no legal jurisdiction to search a house outside of the state of New York. May eventually returned the reels and allowed Paramount to create its cut; she did not direct again for over a decade.

== Release ==
Angered by May's contentiousness during filming and editing, Paramount booked the completed film into theaters for a few days to satisfy contractual obligations, but did not give the film its full support. Paramount's cut, riddled with continuity errors, was released to the ridicule of critics. This led John Simon to call the film "a celluloid death wish" in a 1976 article in New York magazine. In 1978, Julian Schlossberg, who had previously worked in acquisitions for Paramount before starting his own company, Castle Hill Productions, purchased the rights from the studio with May and Falk.

A new version of the film, approved by May, was shown at the Museum of Modern Art in New York City for the Directors Guild of America fiftieth anniversary tribute on November 17, 1986. The film was also shown in Park City, Utah, at the United States Film Festival's Tribute to John Cassavetes on January 25, 1989. The film was released on Blu-ray and DVD by The Criterion Collection in 2019.

== Reception ==
On review aggregator website Rotten Tomatoes, the film holds an approval rating of 88% based on 25 reviews, with an average rating of 7.6/10. According to Metacritic, which assigned a weighted average score of 81 out of 100 based on 15 critics, the film received "universal acclaim". In 2018, The Guardian praised the film as 'a neglected gem of 70s cinema', granting it a five star review.

Leonard Maltin gave the film 21/2-stars-out-of-4, calling it a "Ragged film" that "improves as it goes along" with "superb performances by Falk and Cassavetes." Ben Sachs of the Chicago Reader wrote: "May allows the improvisational rhythms of her actors to establish the surface realism of the film, but beneath the surface lies a tight, poetically stylized screenplay that leads the two characters, as they pass a fearful, frenzied night together, back over the range of their lives, from infancy to adulthood. What emerges is a profound, unsentimental portrait of male friendship-and of its ultimate impossibility." A retrospective review from Richard Brody for The New Yorker stated: "This hard-nosed masterpiece, from 1976, was written and directed by the doyenne of loopy comedy, Elaine May, who borrowed the scarily intense and spontaneous performance style of Cassavetes’s films to expose the cruelty of their male bravado—the ugliness of what his men do to women and what his women take from men. The wild emotional swings render the inevitable conclusion all the more shattering, as the film lays bare the price of friendship and the gall of betrayal. In May’s view, it takes a real man to stop being one of the guys."

Vincent Canby of The New York Times found much to criticize: "It's a melodrama about male friendship told in such insistently claustrophobic detail that to watch it is to risk an artificially induced anxiety attack. It's nearly two hours of being locked in a telephone booth with a couple of method actors who won't stop talking, though they have nothing of interest to say, and who won't stop jiggling around, though they plainly aren't going anywhere. They just seem to be carrying on—making elaborate actor fusses—in front of the camera. Miss May is a witty, gifted, very intelligent director. It took guts for her to attempt a film like this, but she failed."
