= Nichols and May: Take Two =

American documentary television special

- Genre: Documentary
- Directed by: Phillip Schopper
- Music by: Benson Taylor
- Country of origin: United States
- Original language: English
- No. of episodes: 1

Production
- Executive producers: Susan Lacy; Karen Bernstein; Tamar Hacker; Cynthia Reed
- Producer: Julian Schlossberg
- Editor: Phillip Schopper
- Running time: 60 minutes
- Production companies: WNET Thirteen; American Masters; Eagle Rock Entertainment

Original release
- Network: PBS
- Release: May 22 – May 22, 1996

Nichols and May: Take Two is a 1996 documentary film directed by Phillip Schopper about the comedy sketch team starring Mike Nichols and Elaine May, often referred to as Nichols and May.

The documentary series premiered as part of the American Masters series PBS. Documentary about the influential comedy team known as Nichols and May, includes highlights of the team's many television appearances, featuring recently discovered kinescopes of live performances not seen since their original television broadcasts in the late 1950s and 60s. Four of their radio sketches have been re-created with new animation created especially for the program. The documentary also features insights from fellow comedians Steve Martin, Robin Williams, Richard Lewis, and Steve Allen.

== Summary ==
The documentary highlights the comedy team's roots and eventual influence throughout the comedy world. Together they used sketch comedy and improv comedy in a way no other artist had done before. They refined their act for clubs and television appearances. Together they made three comedy albums which were recorded in their nightclub and radio acts. The special features extended excerpts of some of the classic routines, which were performed everywhere from the Blue Angel club in Greenwich Village to The Steve Allen Show on NBC.

== Participants ==
Comedians, collaborators, who were interviewed include:

- Mike Nichols (archival footage)
- Elaine May (archival footage)
- Steve Martin
- Robin Williams
- Steve Allen
- Richard Lewis
- Arthur Penn
- Tom Brokaw
- Jack Rollins
- Jules Feiffer

== Production ==
Susan Lacy, executive producer on the project and creator of American Masters series stated, "I've been wanting to do them for a long time, and they never have wanted to do this." Nichols and May had repeatedly been notoriously publicity-shy and resisted allowing anyone to compile an anthology of their comedy work. According to the New York Times profile on the project, "Ms. Lacey decided to bide her time, feeling certain that if Mr. Nichols and Ms. May did relent, they would be naturals for the WNET biographical series, which has profiled 85 people over the last decade." She stated "In their own way, they were a watershed, there isn't a working comedian today, from Woody Allen to Robin Williams, who doesn't say that Nichols and May opened their eyes. Whenever there's creative work that lasts, it's because it has an essential humanity that does not age. Mother-in-law jokes age, but if you are dealing, the way they did, with human experiences that do not age, it resonates."

== Reception ==
Critic for Variety Tony Scott praised the documentary and its subjects writing, "They were introducing a comedy style on a grand scale — improvisational as well as semi-set (but always changing) pieces. Separately, they're masterful; together, knowing where the personal laugh was, they were incomparable."

The Chicago Tribune critic noted, "Unlike many films of this kind it understands, too, the importance of including full-length routines, rather than mere snippets."

Entertainment Weekly described the release of the documentary as "uncannily timely" and noted "The airing of Take Two also coincides with the recent CD release of the duo's best-known recordings. Comedy ages notoriously badly, but Nichols and May's adroit work remains fresh and juicy."

== Release ==
Since its original airing on PBS, there has been no physical version of the film released to the public. The film has been shown on Turner Classic Movies, and has been featured at the Jewish Film Festival and TCM's 2021 Film Festival.
