= Phillip Schopper =

American film editor

Phillip Schopper is an Emmy-award winning film editor.

== Early life and education ==
Phillip Schopper was born in Phoenix, Arizona, where he began his acting career. He began making films as a child using his parents' 8mm camera.

Schopper later studied at the University of Arizona and American Academy of Dramatic Arts.

== Career ==
Schopper began his career as Bruce Davison's understudy in an off-Broadway play called A Home Away From and later that year he was cast as the juvenile lead (Tad Springer) in the National Company touring production of the hit Broadway play, Spofford, written and directed by the legendary Broadway director, Herman Shumlin.

His first feature-length film editing project was the 1976 music documentary Heartworn Highways. During his career, Schopper has been involved in the production or post-production of several notable films, such as Prince of the City, Resurrection, Nine to Five, Reds, and Ishtar.

Schopper has worked as an editor on projects for networks such as PBS, Bravo, and A&E Network. For PBS he edited and directed two programs for the American Masters series, Nichols and May: Take Two, and The Lives of Lillian Hellman. While at ABC, he was an editor for the DuPont Award-winning series Hopkins 24/7 and the Emmy-nominated series NYPD 24/7. Schopper has also edited several documentaries for HBO, including the Emmy-winning Teddy: In His Own Words and the Emmy-nominated Gloria: In Her Own Words, which profiles Gloria Steinem.

In 2013, the HBO documentary Nixon by Nixon, received three nominations at the News and Documentary Emmys, including Outstanding Editing.

In 2014, Schopper co-directed and edited All About Ann: Governor Richards of the Lone Star State, which was released on HBO. The film premiered at the Tribeca Film Festival. A year later, he edited along with Angela Gandini HBO documentary San Francisco 2.0 which was nominated for Long Form Emmy in the same year.

In 2018, Schopper, along with Sabine Krayenbuhl, and Brad Fuller, edited The Price of Everything, an Emmy and Sundance Film Festival Grand Jury award nominated film about the contemporary art world.

In 2020, Schopper along with Simon Ardizzone edited Kill Chain: The Cyber War on America's Elections which was nominated for Video Source Award and News and Documentary Emmy nominee (for Outstanding Investigative Documentary) in 2021.

Schopper is also a member of the American Cinema Editors.

== Filmography ==
- Heartworn Highways (1976)
- The Lost Honor of Kathryn Beck (1984)
- Ishtar (1987)
- In the Spirit (1990)
- The Emperor's New Clothes (1992)
- Reunion (1994)
- Nichols and May: Take Two (1996)
- The Lives of Lillian Hellman (1998)
- Shakespeare's Women & Claire Bloom (1999)
- The Saffron Limited (2005)
- Gloria: In Her Own Words (2011)
- Beyond 9/11: Portraits of Resilience (2011)
- Nixon By Nixon: In His Own Words (2014)
- All About Ann: Governor Richards of the Lone Star State (2014)
- San Francisco 2.0 (2015)
- The Price of Everything (2018)
- Kill Chain: The Cyber War on America's Elections (2020)
- Return to Space (2022)
