= Jack Ritchie =

American writer (1922–1983)

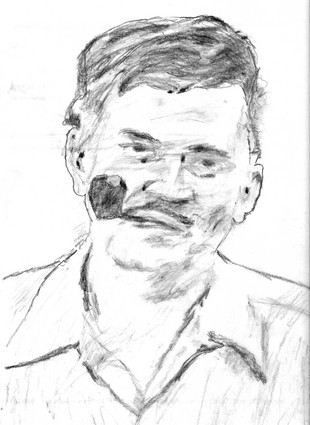
- Pencil sketch of Ritchie
- Born: John George Reitci; February 26, 1922; Milwaukee, Wisconsin, United States
- Died: April 25, 1983 (aged 61); Milwaukee, Wisconsin, United States
- Occupation: Short story writer
- Spouse: Rita Ritchie (nee Krohne)
- Writing career
- Language: English
- Genre: Crime fiction
- Notable awards: Edgar Award, 1982

John George Reitci (February 26, 1922 – April 25, 1983) was an American writer, primarily known for his vast output of crime fiction short stories under the pen name Jack Ritchie. He completed one novel shortly before his death; it was published posthumously in 1987.

== Personal life ==
=== Early life ===
Jack Ritchie was born in a room behind his father's tailor shop in Milwaukee, Wisconsin on February 26, 1922. After attending Boys Technical High School, Ritchie enrolled at the Milwaukee State Teachers College for two years. During the Second World War, he enlisted or was drafted into the United States Army in 1942 and was stationed in the Central Pacific for two years, serving for much of that period on the island of Kwajalein. It was here that he first discovered crime and mystery fiction. To pass the time, he read many mystery books and it was through this that he grew to love the genre.

At the end of the war, Ritchie returned to his hometown of Milwaukee. After trying unsuccessfully to go back to college under the G.I. Bill, Ritchie worked for a time in his father's shop. Not wishing to pursue a tailor's career, Ritchie decided to try writing stories for a living. Ritchie's mother, Irma Reitci, also wrote short stories and she introduced him to a literary agent, Larry Sternig, to whom Jack gave a copy of a story he had just written. Sternig recognised Ritchie's writing ability at once and sold the story, "Always the Season", to the New York Daily News in 1953. (Note: "Always the Season" describes how two female legal secretaries orchestrate a meet cute for the younger with the junior partner of a law firm.) According to Ritchie, to gauge his talent, he decided to spend a year writing fifty stories, submitting one per week, and if none of them sold, he would give up on being an author. The eighth story was sold, cementing his career as a writer.

=== Family ===
Ritchie was introduced by Sternig to a fellow writer, Rita Krohne at a New Year's Eve party; they were married in 1954. Writing as Rita Ritchie, she published her first book, "The Year of the Horse", in 1957; it was followed by a series of historical adventure novels for children. (Note: Historical fiction novels by Rita Ritchie include: — (1957). The Year of the Horse. New York, New York: E.P. Dutton & Company, Inc.; — (1958). The Golden Hawks of Genghis Khan. New York, New York: E.P. Dutton & Company, Inc.; — (1959). The Enemy at the Gate. New York, New York: E.P. Dutton & Company, Inc. LCCN 59-11500.; — (1960). Secret Beyond the Mountains. New York, New York: E.P. Dutton & Company, Inc. LCCN 60-11862.; — (1963). Ice Falcon. New York, New York: W.W. Norton & Company, Inc. LCCN 63-7987.) The couple made their living from the combined income of their freelance writing, though Jack Ritchie stated that they never collaborated on any of their stories.

Ritchie and his wife lived in various Milwaukee locales throughout the 1950s. Their first home together was a secluded log cabin on Washington Island. With the birth of their first child in 1957, the Ritchies relocated to a larger house on the island. In 1964, they moved back to the mainland, living in a farmhouse just west of Jefferson and raising a family of four children.

While his wife took part-time work to supplement the family income, Jack dedicated himself to the writing of stories. Ritchie moved to Fort Atkinson, Wisconsin after he and his wife divorced in 1978.

=== Interests ===
Ritchie was an avid reader of non-fiction books and had a particular interest in history. He was also a fan of word puzzles and did the crossword in the Milwaukee Journal religiously. When asked about influences on his work, Ritchie stated that he admired the writings of Agatha Christie, John D. MacDonald, Raymond Chandler, and Donald E. Westlake.

=== Death ===
Shortly after completing his only novel, Tiger Island, Jack Ritchie died of a heart attack at the Veterans Administration Hospital in Milwaukee. Ritchie was given a private, military funeral in Milwaukee on April 27, 1983.

== Career ==
=== Short stories ===
Untitled

When it was all over, only two people remained on the face of the earth. After twenty years, the older man died.

— Reportedly the shortest story by Jack Ritchie, quoted in the introduction to Little Boxes of Bewilderment (1989)

Jack Ritchie was a prolific writer of short stories, published in an extraordinary variety of periodicals and newspapers. His first published story was "Always the Season", which ran in the December 29, 1953 issue of the New York Daily News. He contributed several "hard-boiled" detective and crime fiction stories to Manhunt magazine throughout the 1950s; other stories appeared in such diverse publications as The Philadelphia Inquirer, Stag, New York Daily Mirror, Smashing Detective Stories, and Good Housekeeping. Ultimately, Ritchie published well over 500 stories.

Ritchie's prolific output to many publications can be attributed to his lifelong agent, Larry Sternig, who would promptly send out manuscripts whenever a new publication appeared on the scene. However, Ritchie sold more stories to Alfred Hitchcock's Mystery Magazine than any other periodical: 123 stories over a period of 23 years, 1959–1982. (Note: As an example, in the November 1960 issue, Ritchie published two stories: "Politics Is Simply Murder" and "9 From 12 Leaves 3", the latter published under the pseudonym Steve O'Connell. "Politics Is Simply Murder" tells the tale of Rodney Boland, a contract killer engaged by and ultimately entangled with both a wife and husband for conflicting reasons. In "9 From 12 Leaves 3", the narrator, Henry, plots to kill the remaining two members of a private club formed originally from a dozen men, but learns his fellow survivors also have secrets.) One of these tales, "The Green Heart", (Note: "The Green Heart", first published in the March 1963 issue of Alfred Hitchcock's mystery magazine, is narrated by William, a gold-digging husband who plots to murder his wife Henrietta, but finds himself protecting her innocent heart instead.) was adapted by director/star Elaine May into the cult movie classic A New Leaf co-starring Walter Matthau. "The Green Heart" was also adapted into a musical by Charles Busch and Rusty Magee in 1997. Other stories from AHMM were used in the popular television series Alfred Hitchcock Presents. Nearly all of Ritchie's stories have been reprinted in periodicals and anthologies, with one story, "For All the Rude People", (Note: "For All the Rude People", first published in the June 1961 issue of Alfred Hitchcock's mystery magazine, documents the vigilante justice of Mr. L. Turner, who sharply departs from "a bland life" following his diagnosis with a terminal illness.) being re-published 12 times.

For Boys' Life, Ritchie regularly wrote stories about comic interactions with exchange students from Liechtenstein, set at fictional Robert Louis Stevenson High School in Wisconsin. (Note: In "When I Look Back, I See Everybody" (Boys' Life, September 1967), the narrator Jerry repeatedly refers to a water fountain using a region-specific dialect as a "bubbler".) In the early 1970s, Ritchie created two popular recurring characters, the vampire-sleuth Cardula, an anagram of Dracula, and Detective Henry Turnbuckle, (Note: The character was initially named Henry H. Buckle in his first appearances, published in 1971; all 30 Turnbuckle stories were collected into the anthology The Adventures of Henry Turnbuckle (1987).) both of whom would feature in some of Ritchie's best known stories. More television adaptations followed, with several stories serving as the basis for episodes of the show Tales of the Unexpected. One of Ritchie's stories, "The Absence of Emily", (Note: "The Absence of Emily", first published in the January 28, 1981 issue of Ellery Queen's Mystery Magazine, is told by Albert, who is suspected of foul play by his neighbor and cousin-in-law Millicent after his wife Emily's extended absence.) which won the Edgar Award in 1982, has been filmed twice. Throughout the 1970s, Ritchie continued to contribute stories to various publications, most often to Ellery Queen's Mystery Magazine. Ritchie was also a lifelong member of the Council for Wisconsin Writers, from which he won three awards for his short fiction.

Ritchie's short stories have been collected in multiple anthologies. There are four anthology monographs in English, three of which were published posthumously: A New Leaf and other stories (1971), The Adventures of Henry Turnbuckle (1987), Little Boxes of Bewilderment (1989), and The Best of Manhunt 4 (2022). After his death, new stories continued to be published posthumously, the most recent being "The Fabricator", which appeared in the May, 2009 issue of the Alfred Hitchcock Mystery Magazine. (Note: In "The Fabricator", Mr. Winters demands his personal secretary Clarence engage a contract killer to punish Leander McCullum, who had expelled Winters from a private club for cheating at gin rummy.)

=== Novel ===
Ritchie's only novel, Tiger Island, was published in 1987, four years after his death.

=== Reception ===
Several prominent editors and authors in the mystery field who have praised Ritchie include Alfred Hitchcock, Donald E. Westlake, Anthony Boucher, Francis M. Nevins Jr., and Edward D. Hoch. Westlake said he was "a brilliant man in the wrong pew, a miniaturist in an age of elephantiasis". Boucher praised his "exemplary neatness. No word is wasted, and many words serve more than one purpose."
