= Carrie Courogen =

American writer

Carrie Courogen is an American writer, editor, and director.

== Career ==
Courogen has written for several media outlets that include Air Mail, Glamour, Teen Vogue, Vanity Fair, and Vice. She has worked for Condé Nast and currently works as a contributing editor for Bright Wall/Dark Room. In 2024 Courogen published her first book, a biography on American actress and comedian Elaine May entitled Miss May Does Not Exist. The book was nominated for the 2024 John Leonard Prize for Best First Book from the National Book Critics Circle.

== Works ==
=== Books ===
- "Liz Phair", in Go All the Way (2019, Barnacle Book, ISBN 978-1-945572-78-4)
- Miss May Does Not Exist (2024, St. Martin's Press, ISBN 978-1-250-27922-4)

=== Other works ===
- "1987 with Carrie Courogen", A Very Good Year, June 2, 2024.
