= Mike Nichols: American Masters =

- Written by: Susan Lacy
- Directed by: Elaine May
- Starring: Mike Nichols
- Original language: English

Production
- Producers: Julian Schlossberg; Michael Kantor; Roy Furman
- Cinematography: Michael Claeys
- Editors: Michael Claeys; Phillip Schopper
- Running time: 54 minutes
- Production companies: Jumer Productions; Witnesses Documentary Productions; Bennington Productions; Thirteen Productions

Original release
- Network: PBS
- Release: January 29, 2016

Mike Nichols: American Masters is a 2016 documentary film directed by Elaine May about the life of Mike Nichols broadcast on the PBS series American Masters. It is derived from a lengthy interview with Nichols conducted by producer Julian Schlossberg. Brian Lowry of Variety has called it "the last memorable Nichols-May collaboration." Richard Brody said that although it is not a major contribution to May's life's work, it "is nonetheless distinctive in its sparseness, its fixed and almost obsessive concentration on Nichols’s face and voice... [it's] May’s highest tribute to Nichols."

== Participants ==
- Mike Nichols
- Renata Adler
- Emanuel Azenberg
- Bob Balaban
- Alec Baldwin
- Matthew Broderick
- James L. Brooks
- Stanley Donen
- Jules Feiffer
- Tom Hanks
- Alex Hassilev
- Dustin Hoffman
- Tony Kushner
- Nathan Lane
- Frank Langella
- Elaine May
- Jack Rollins
- Neil Simon
- Paul Simon
- Steven Spielberg
- Meryl Streep
- Robin Williams
