= In the Spirit (film) =

- Film poster
- Directed by: Sandra Seacat
- Written by: Jeannie Berlin; Laurie Jones
- Produced by: Beverly Irby; Julian Schlossberg
- Starring: Jeannie Berlin; Olympia Dukakis; Peter Falk; Melanie Griffith; Elaine May; Marlo Thomas
- Cinematography: Richard Quinlan
- Edited by: Brad Fuller
- Music by: Patrick Williams
- Distributed by: Academy Entertainment
- Release date: April 6, 1990 (USA)
- Running time: 94 minutes
- Country: United States
- Language: English

In the Spirit is a 1990 American comedy film starring Marlo Thomas and Elaine May, directed by noted acting coach Sandra Seacat, with a screenplay co-authored by May's daughter Jeannie Berlin and Laurie Jones, both of whom also appear in the film. Supposedly, May secretly directed the film.

== Plot ==
Reva Prosky, a New Age devotee and Manhattanite who is an advocate of healing crystals and vegetarianism, goes about "improving" the lifestyles of everyone she meets, including her neighbor Crystal, a prostitute who wants to become a bartender. Marianne Flan has recently moved to New York City with her husband Roger after his firing from his job. The dissimilar Reva and Marianne are thrown together when the former is recommended to help decorate the latter’s new apartment. Although it is only supposed to take a few days, the renovation ends up becoming a drawn-out, months-long debacle. Marianne and Roger are forced to move in with Reva, who increasingly annoys the couple with her quirky behavior.

One day, Crystal is found murdered in her apartment. Just before her death, she apparently expressed interest in a newspaper article about the mafia, then left her datebook at Reva’s place. At the same time, Roger leaves Marianne for his former wife. Blaming Reva for all of her woes, Marianne moves back into her uninhabitable apartment. However, both women’s apartments are broken into. Believing the break-ins are related to Crystal’s murder, the pair set out to solve the mystery of her death.

== Cast ==
- Marlo Thomas as Reva Prosky
- Elaine May as Marianne Flan
- Jeannie Berlin as Crystal
- Peter Falk as Roger Flan
- Olympia Dukakis as Sue
- Melanie Griffith as Lureen
- Phil Harper as Homeless Executive
- Steve Powers as Documentary Interviewer
- Hope Cameron as New Age Lecturer
- David Eigenberg as Handyman #1
- Mark Boone Junior as 2nd Policeman
- Gary Swanson as 1st Detective
- Rockets Redglare as Bartender
- Roy Nathanson as Accident Bystander
- Christopher Durang as Ambulance Attendant

== Critical reception ==
In a mixed review, Sheila Benson of the Los Angeles Times wrote that Jeannie Berlin, "co-writer of the screenplay with Laurie Jones, has her mother Elaine May’s timing, her deadpan, her enormous eyes and her briskly unforgiving slant on life. If their screenplay could keep up the pace of the movie’s first half, she and Jones would have a grand-slam home run." Benson said Peter Falk provides the film's funniest performance, and lamented when his character exits the film. Janet Maslin of The New York Times criticized the directing and editing of the film, writing "The camera is treated as if it were radioactive, never being allowed to linger where a performer might be heard clearly or shown off to good advantage".

TV Guide reviewed the film positively and wrote, "For all its shortcomings, this raggedly amusing farce offers more laughs than most smoothly crafted Hollywood assembly line comedies." Its lone criticism was the script's "failure to follow through with its amusing premise and clever structure. After setting up a wonderful satire of the New Age set and framing it with telling narration, the film then abandons both and becomes a conventional buddy movie." The review added: "May's performance as the downwardly mobile executive's wife is one of the most outrageously funny exhibitions of comic acting in years. Because of the script's adventurousness and the cast's sparkle, In The Spirit emerges as an off-the-wall surprise. If reincarnation is a reality, then it's just possible that the spirit of screwball comedy lives again in In the Spirit." Dave Kehr of the Chicago Tribune gave the film three stars and called it "occasionally incoherent, entirely unaccountable and often very funny".
