= Elaine May =

American actress and comedian (born 1932)

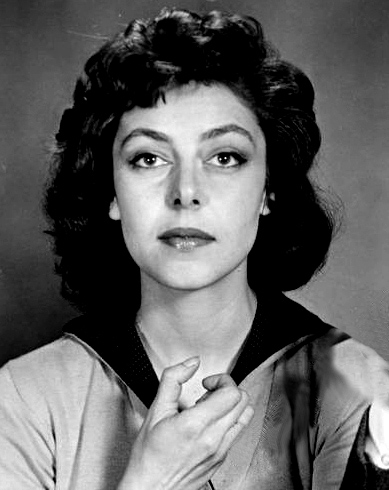
- May performing in 1959
- Born: Elaine Iva Berlin; April 21, 1932 (age 94); Philadelphia, Pennsylvania, U.S.
- Other names: Esther Dale, Elly May
- Occupations: Actress; comedian; writer; film director
- Years active: 1955–present
- Known for: A New Leaf (1971); The Heartbreak Kid (1972); Mikey and Nicky (1976); Ishtar (1987)
- Spouses: Marvin Irving May (m. 1948; div. 1960); Sheldon Harnick (m. 1962; div. 1963); David L. Rubinfine (m. 1963; died 1982)
- Partner: Stanley Donen (1999–2019; his death)
- Children: Jeannie Berlin
- Awards: Full list

Elaine Iva May (née Berlin; born April 21, 1932) is an American actress, comedian, writer, and director. She first gained fame in the 1950s for her improvisational comedy routines with Mike Nichols before going on to write and direct several critically acclaimed films. She has received numerous awards, including a BAFTA Award, a Grammy Award, and a Tony Award. She was honored with the National Medal of Arts from President Barack Obama in 2013, and an Honorary Academy Award in 2022.

In 1955, May moved to Chicago and became a founding member of the Compass Players, an improvisational theater group. She began working alongside Nichols and in 1957, they both quit the group to form their own stage act, Nichols and May. In New York, they performed nightly in clubs in Greenwich Village alongside Joan Rivers and Woody Allen, as well as on the Broadway stage. They also made regular appearances on television and radio broadcasts. They released multiple comedy albums and received four Grammy Award nominations, winning Best Comedy Album for An Evening with Mike Nichols and Elaine May in 1962. Their collaboration was covered in the PBS documentary Nichols and May: Take Two (1996).

May infrequently acted in films, including Luv, Enter Laughing (both 1967), California Suite (1978), and Small Time Crooks (2000). She became the first female director with a Hollywood deal since Ida Lupino when she directed the 1971 black screwball comedy A New Leaf. Experimenting with genres, she directed the dark romantic comedy The Heartbreak Kid (1972), the gangster film Mikey and Nicky (1976), and adventure comedy Ishtar (1987). May later earned acclaim writing the screenplays for Warren Beatty's Heaven Can Wait (1978), and Mike Nichols' The Birdcage (1996) and Primary Colors (1998). Heaven Can Wait and Primary Colors each earned her a nomination for the Academy Award for Best Adapted Screenplay, while the latter won her the BAFTA Award for Best Adapted Screenplay.

May returned to acting in Woody Allen's Amazon Prime series Crisis in Six Scenes (2016) and on Broadway in the revival of the Kenneth Lonergan play The Waverly Gallery (2018) the latter of which earned her the Tony Award for Best Actress in a Play. The win made May the second-oldest performer behind Lois Smith to win a Tony Award for acting. In 2022, the Academy of Motion Pictures Arts and Sciences gave May an Honorary Academy Award for her "bold, uncompromising approach to filmmaking, as a writer, director, and actress".

== Early years and personal life ==
Elaine Iva Berlin was born on April 21, 1932, in Philadelphia, Pennsylvania, the daughter of Jewish parents, theater director and actor Jack Berlin and actress Ida (Aaron) Berlin. As a child, May performed with her father in his traveling Yiddish theater company, which he took around the country. Her stage debut on the road was at the age of three, and she eventually played the character of a generic little boy named Benny.

Because the troupe toured extensively, May had attended over fifty schools by the time she was ten, having spent as little as a few weeks enrolled at any one time. May said she hated school and would spend her free time at home reading fairy tales and mythology. Her father died when she was eleven years old, and then she and her mother moved to Los Angeles, where May later enrolled in Hollywood High School. She dropped out when she was fourteen years old. Two years later, at the age of sixteen, she married Marvin May, an engineer and toy inventor. They had one child, Jeannie Berlin (born 1949), who became an actress and screenwriter. The couple divorced in 1960, and she married lyricist Sheldon Harnick in 1962; they divorced a year later. In 1964, May married her psychoanalyst, David L. Rubinfine; they remained married until his death in 1982.

May's long-time companion was director Stanley Donen, from 1999 until his death in 2019. Donen said he proposed marriage "about 172 times".

== Career ==
=== 1950–1957: Stage career and Compass Players ===
After her marriage to Marvin May, she studied acting. She also held odd jobs during that period, such as a roof salesman, and tried to enroll in college. She learned, however, that colleges in California required a high school diploma to apply, which she did not have. After finding out that the University of Chicago was one of the few colleges that would accept students without diplomas, she set out with seven dollars and hitchhiked to Chicago.

Soon after moving to Chicago in 1950, May began informally taking classes at the university by auditing, sitting in without enrolling. She nevertheless sometimes engaged in discussions with instructors and once started a huge fight after saying that Socrates' apology was a political move. Mike Nichols, who was then an actor in the school's theatrical group, remembers her coming to his philosophy class, making "outrageous" comments, and leaving. They learned about each other from friends, eventually being introduced after one of his stage shows. The director Paul Sills brought May to Nichols and said, "Mike, I want you to meet the only other person on the campus of the University of Chicago who's as hostile as you are: Elaine May." Six weeks later, they bumped into each other at a train station in Chicago and soon began spending time together over the following weeks as "dead-broke theatre junkies."

In 1955, May joined a new, off-campus improvisational theater group in Chicago, The Compass Players, becoming one of its charter members. The group was founded by Sills and David Shepherd. Nichols later joined the group, wherein he resumed his friendship with May. At first, he was unable to improvise well on stage, but with inspiration from May, they began developing improvised comedy sketches together. Nichols remembered this period:

From then on it became mostly pleasure because of Elaine's generosity. The fact of Elaine—her presence—kept me going. She was the only one who had faith in me. I loved it... We had a similar sense of humor and irony... When I was with her I became something more than I had been before.

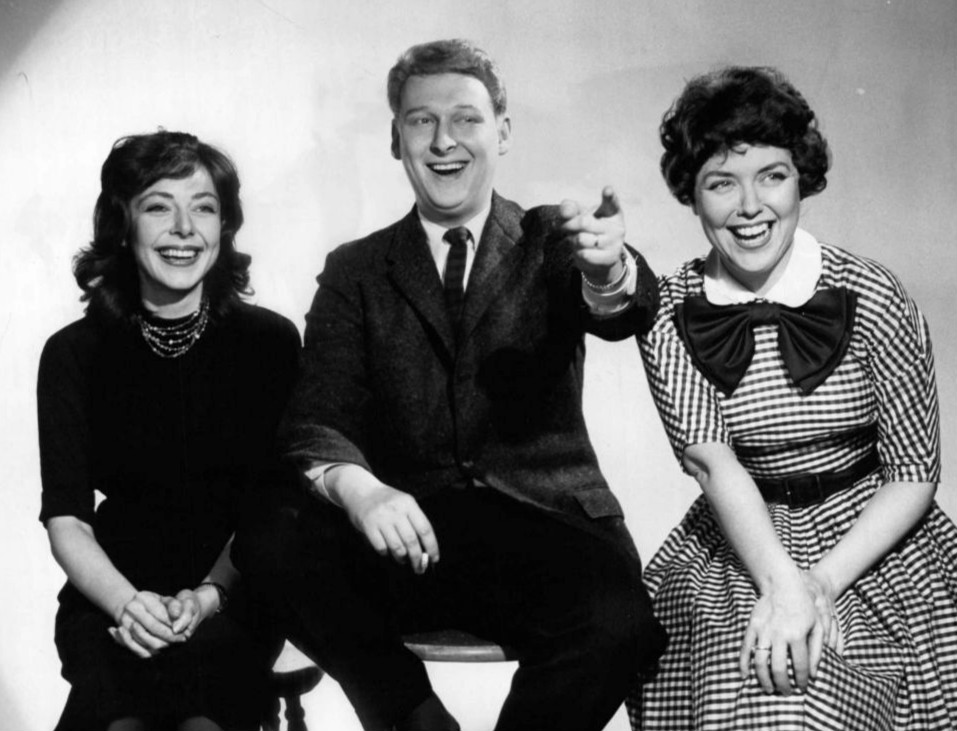
May, Nichols and Dorothy Loudon, 1959

May became prominent as a member of the Compass's acting group, a quality others in the group observed. Bobbi Gordon, an actor, remembers that she was often the center of attention: "The first time I met her was at Compass... Elaine was this grande dame of letters. With people sitting around her feet, staring up at her, open-mouthed in awe, waiting for 'The Word'." A similar impression struck Compass actor Bob Smith:

May would hold court, discussing her days as a child actor in the Yiddish theater, as men hung on her every word. Every guy who knew her was in love with her. You'd have been stupid not to have been.

As an integral member of their group, May was open to giving novices a chance, including the hiring of a black actor and generally making the group "more democratic". And by observing her high level of performance creativity, everyone's work was improved. "She was the strongest woman I ever met," adds Compass actor Nancy Ponder.

In giving all her attention to acting, however, she neglected her home life. Fellow actress Barbara Harris recalled that May lived in a cellar with only one piece of furniture, a ping-pong table. "She wore basic beatnik black and, like her film characters, was a brilliant disheveled klutz."

Group actor Omar Shapli was "struck by her piercing, dark-eyed, sultry stare. It was really unnerving", he says. Nichols remembers that "everybody wanted Elaine, and the people who got her couldn't keep her." Theater critic John Lahr agrees, noting that "her juicy good looks were a particularly disconcerting contrast to her sharp tongue."

"Elaine was too formidable, one of the most intelligent, beautiful, and witty women I had ever met. I hoped I would never see her again."

— Richard Burton

May's sense of humor, including what she found funny about everyday life, was different from others' in the group. Novelist Herbert Gold, who dated May, says that "she treated everything funny that men take seriously... She was never serious. Her life was a narrative." Another ex-boyfriend, James Sacks, says that "Elaine had a genuine beautiful madness." Nevertheless, states Gold, "she was very cute, a lot like Debra Winger, just a pretty Jewish girl."

May was considered highly intelligent. "She's about fifty percent more brilliant than she needs to be," says actor Eugene Troobnick. Those outside their theater group sometimes noticed that same quality. British actor Richard Burton, who was married to Elizabeth Taylor at the time, agreed with that impression after he first met May while he was starring in Camelot on Broadway.

=== 1957–1961: Nichols and May comedy team ===
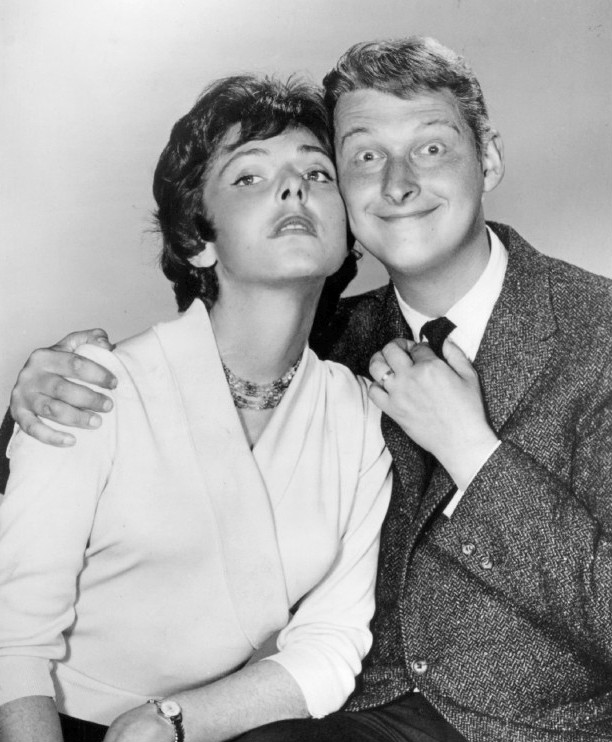
Nichols and May 1960

Nichols was personally asked to leave the Compass Players in 1957 because he and May became too good, which threw the company off balance, noted club manager Jay Landsman. Nichols was told he had too much talent. Nichols then left the group in 1957, with May quitting with him. They next formed their own stand-up comedy team, Nichols and May. After contacting some agents in New York, they were asked to audition for Jack Rollins, who would later become Woody Allen's manager and executive producer. Rollins said he was stunned by how good their act was:

Their work was so startling, so new, as fresh as could be. I was stunned by how really good they were, actually as impressed by their acting technique as by their comedy... They were totally adventurous and totally innocent, in a certain sense. That's why it was accepted. They would uncover little dark niches that you felt but had never expressed... I'd never seen this technique before. I thought, My God, these are two people writing hilarious comedy on their feet!

By 1960, they made their Broadway debut with An Evening with Mike Nichols and Elaine May, which later won a Grammy. After performing their act a number of years in New York's various clubs, and then on Broadway, with most of the shows sold out, Nichols could not believe their success:

We were winging it, making it up as we went along. It never even crossed our minds that it had any value beyond the moment. It was great to study and learn and work there. We were stunned when we got to New York... Never for a moment did we consider that we would do this for a living. It was just a handy way to make some money until we grew up.

His feelings were shared by May, who was also taken aback by their success, especially having some real income after living in near-poverty. She told a Newsweek interviewer, "When we came to New York, we were practically barefoot. And I still can't get used to walking in high heels."

The uniqueness of their act made them an immediate success in New York. Their style became the "next big thing" in live comedy. Charles H. Joffe, their producer, remembers that sometimes the line to their show went around the block. That partly explains why Milton Berle, a major television comedy star, tried three times without success to see their act. Critic Lawrence Christon recalls his first impression after seeing their act: "You just knew it was a defining moment. They caught the urban tempo, like Woody Allen did." They performed nightly at mostly sold-out shows, in addition to making TV program and commercial appearances and radio broadcasts. Their relatively brief time together as comedy stars led New York talk show host Dick Cavett to call their act "one of the comic meteors in the sky". Woody Allen said, "the two of them came along and elevated comedy to a brand-new level".

Technique

Theater program from 1961

Among the qualities of their act, which according to one writer made them a rarity, was that they used both "snob and mob appeal", which gave them a wide audience. Nachman explains that they presented a new kind of comedy team, unlike previous comedy duos which had an intelligent member alongside a much less intelligent one, as with Laurel and Hardy, Fibber McGee and Molly, Burns and Allen, Abbott and Costello, and Martin and Lewis.

What differentiated their style was that their stage performance created "scenes," a method very unlike the styles of other acting teams. Nor did they rely on fixed gender or comic roles, but instead adapted their own character to fit a sketch idea they came up with. They chose real-life subjects, often from their own life, which were made into satirical and funny vignettes.

This was accomplished by using subtle joke references which they correctly expected their audiences to recognize, whether through clichés or character types. They thereby indirectly poked fun at the new intellectual culture which they saw growing around them. They felt that young Americans were taking themselves too seriously, which became the subject of much of their satire.

Nichols structured the material for their skits, and May came up with most of their ideas. Improvisation became a fairly simple art for them, as they portrayed the urban couple's "Age of Anxiety" in their sketches, and did so on their feet. According to May, it was simple: "It's nothing more than quickly creating a situation between two people and throwing up some kind of problem for one of them."

Nichols noted that after coming up with a sketch idea, they would perform it soon after with little extra rehearsal or writing it down. One example he remembered was inspired simply from a phone call from his mother. I called Elaine and I said, "I've got a really good piece for us tonight." They created a six-minute-long, mostly improvised, "mother and son" sketch, which they performed later that night.

May helped remove the stereotype of women's roles on stage. Producer David Shepherd notes that she accomplished that partly by not choosing traditional 1950s female roles for her characters, which were often housewives or women working at menial jobs. Instead, she often played the character of a sophisticated woman, such as a doctor, a psychiatrist, or an employer. Shepherd notes that "Elaine broke through the psychological restrictions of playing comedy as a woman."

May and Nichols had different attitudes toward their improvisations, however. Where Nichols always needed to know where a sketch was going and what its ultimate point would be, May preferred exploring ideas as the scene progressed. May says that even when they repeated their improvisations, it was not rote but came from re-creating her original impulse. Such improvisational techniques allowed her to make slight changes during a performance. Although May had a wider improvisational range than Nichols, he was generally the one to shape the pieces and steer them to their end. For their recordings, he also made the decision of what to delete.

Team break-up

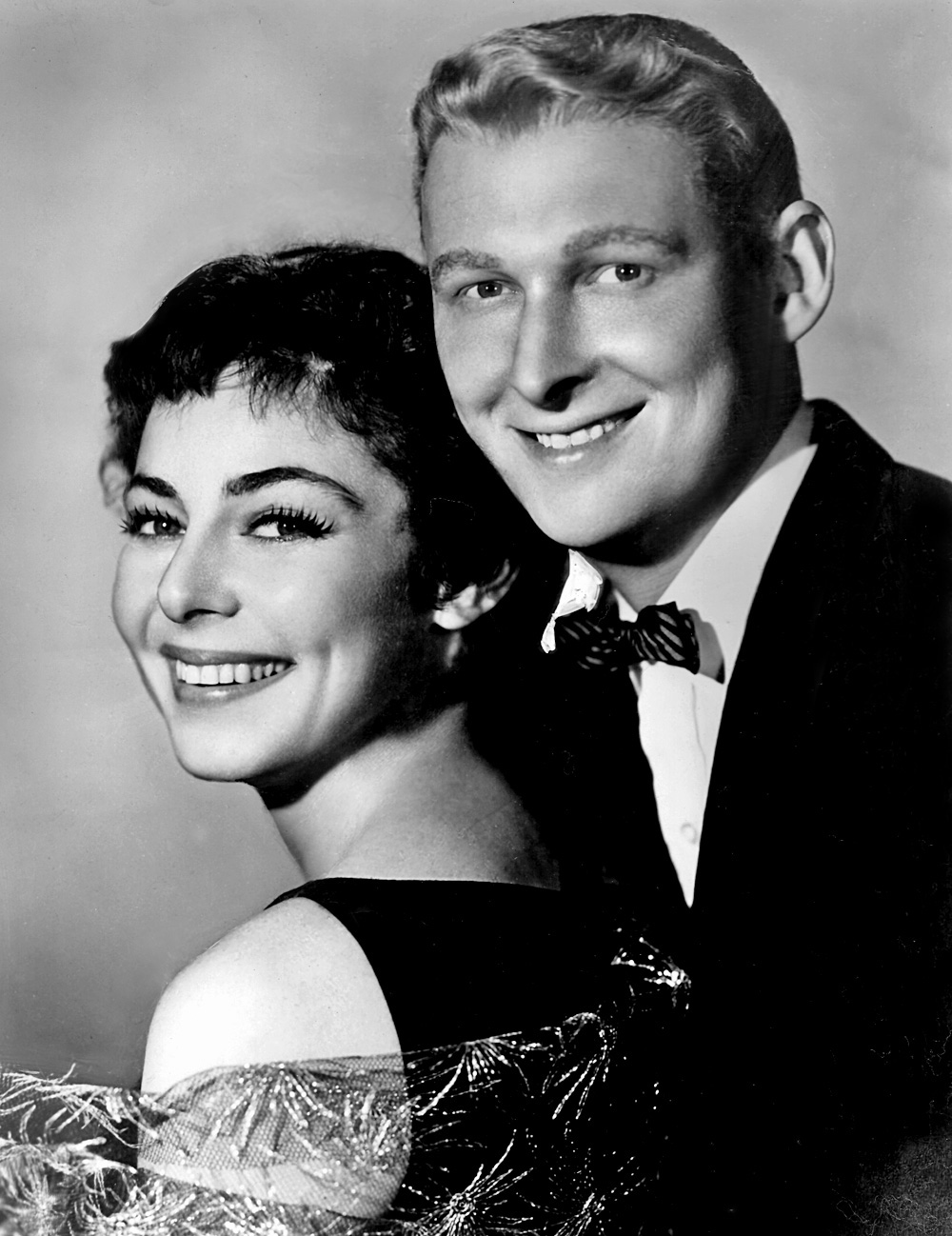
Nichols and May

Audiences were still discovering May and Nichols in 1961, four years after they arrived. However, at the height of their fame, they decided to discontinue their act that year and took their careers in different directions: Nichols became a leading Broadway stage and film director; May became primarily a screenwriter and playwright, with some acting and directing. Among the reasons they decided to call it quits was that keeping their act fresh was becoming more difficult. Nichols explained:

Several things happened. One was that I, more than Elaine, became more and more afraid of our improvisational material. She was always brave. We never wrote a skit, we just sort of outlined it: I'll try to make you, or we'll fight—whatever it was. We found ourselves doing the same material over and over, especially in our Broadway show. This took a great toll on Elaine.

"Nichols and May are perhaps the most ardently missed of all the satirical comedians of their era. When Nichols and May split up, they left no imitators, no descendants, no blueprints or footprints to follow. No one could touch them."

— Author Gerald Nachman

Nichols said that for him personally the breakup was "cataclysmic", and he went into a state of depression: "I didn't know what I was or who I was." There were only sporadic reunions such as a Madison Square Garden benefit for George McGovern for President in June 1972. The event, titled "Together Again for McGovern," also featured two musical groups that had recently broken up, Simon and Garfunkel and Peter, Paul and Mary, as well as singer Dionne Warwick. They also appeared in a 1980 stage production of Who's Afraid of Virginia Woolf? in New Haven, Connecticut.

Director Arthur Penn said of their sudden breakup, "They set the standard and then they had to move on." To New York talk show host Dick Cavett, "They were one of the comic meteors in the sky."

Nichols would re-unite with May when she wrote the screenplay and he directed The Birdcage. It "was like coming home, like getting a piece of yourself back that you thought you'd lost," he said. He adds that May had been very important to him from the moment he first saw her, adding that for her "improv was innate," and few people have that gift.

=== 1962–1969: Playwright and actor ===
May has also acted in comedy films, including Enter Laughing (1967), directed by Carl Reiner, and Luv (1967), costarring Peter Falk and Jack Lemmon. The latter film was not well received by critics, although Lemmon said he enjoyed working alongside May: "She's the finest actress I've ever worked with," he said. "And I've never expressed an opinion about a leading lady before... I think Elaine is touched with genius. She approaches a scene like a director and a writer." Film scholar Gwendolyn Audrey Foster notes that May is drawn to material that borders on dry Yiddish humor. As such, it has not always been well received at the box office. Her style of humor, in writing or acting, often has more to do with traditional Yiddish theater than traditional Hollywood cinema.

Following the break-up, May wrote several plays. Her greatest success was the one-act Adaptation (1969). Other stage plays she has written include Not Enough Rope, Mr Gogol and Mr Preen, Hotline (which was performed off-Broadway in 1995 as part of the anthology play Death Defying Acts), After the Night and the Music, Power Plays, Taller Than A Dwarf, The Way of All Fish, and Adult Entertainment. In 1969, she directed the off-Broadway production of Adaptation/Next.

=== 1970–1999: Career as a writer and director ===
May made her film writing and directing debut in 1971 with A New Leaf, a black comedy based on a short story which she read in an Alfred Hitchcock Mystery Magazine called "The Green Heart" which the author Jack Ritchie would later retitle "A New Leaf". The unconventional "romance" with Walter Matthau as a Manhattan bachelor faced with bankruptcy, also starred May herself as the awkward botanist-heiress, Henrietta Lowell, whom Matthau cynically woos and marries to salvage an extravagant lifestyle. Director May originally submitted a 180-minute work to Paramount, but the studio cut it back by nearly 80 minutes for release. Dissatisfied with the cuts, she fought studio exec Robert Evans to have her name removed, but was unsuccessful. The film has since become a cult classic. Vincent Canby cited the two-reelers of the 1930s and Depression-era screwball comedies when he called it "a beautifully and gently cockeyed movie that recalls at least two different traditions of American film comedy... The entire project is touched by a fine and knowing madness." May received a Golden Globe nomination for her portrayal of Henrietta.

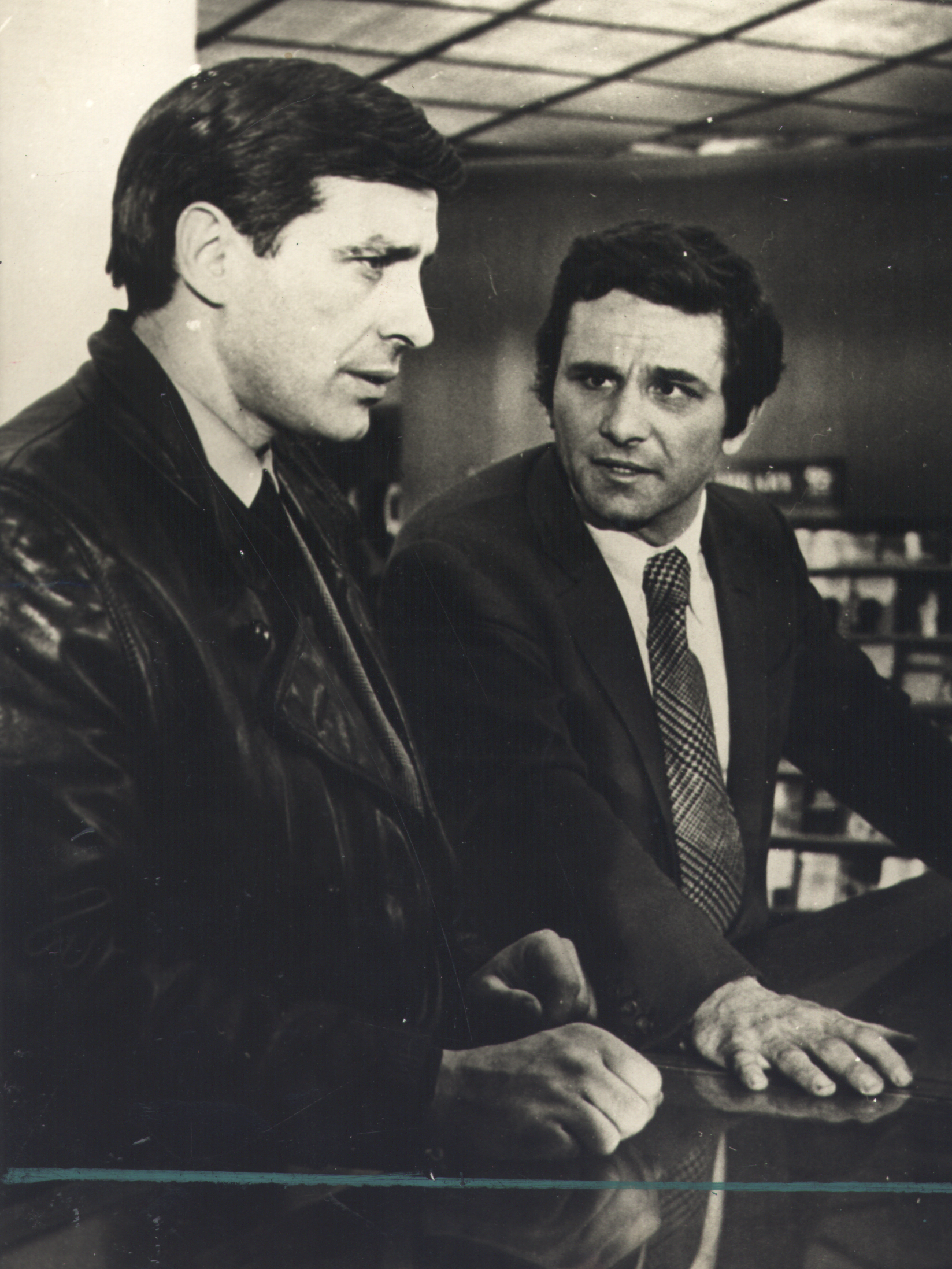
Mikey and Nicky lead actors John Cassavetes (left) and Peter Falk (right) in 1971

May quickly followed her debut film with 1972's The Heartbreak Kid. She limited her role to directing, using a screenplay by Neil Simon, based on a story by Bruce Jay Friedman. The film starred Charles Grodin, Cybill Shepherd, Eddie Albert, and May's own daughter, Jeannie Berlin. It was a major critical success, and holds a 90% fresh rating on Rotten Tomatoes. In 2000, it was listed at No. 91 on AFI's 100 Years... 100 Laughs list. May followed the two comedies by writing and directing the gangster film Mikey and Nicky, starring Peter Falk and John Cassavetes. Budgeted at $1.8 million and scheduled for a summer 1975 release, the film cost $4.3 million and was not released until December 1976. May ended up in a legal battle with Paramount Pictures over post-production costs, at one point hiding reels of the film in her husband's friend's Connecticut garage and later suing the company for $8 million for breach of contract. May worked with Julian Schlossberg to get the rights to the film and released a director's cut in 1980. In 2019, May worked with The Criterion Collection to create the newest director's cut. The film has gained appreciation by many critics and audiences in recent years.

In Herbert Ross's California Suite (1978), written by Neil Simon, she was reunited with A New Leaf co-star Walter Matthau, playing his wife Millie. In addition to writing three of the films she directed, May received an Oscar nomination for updating the 1941 film Here Comes Mr. Jordan as Heaven Can Wait (1978). May reunited with Nichols for a stage production of Who's Afraid of Virginia Woolf? in New Haven in 1980. She contributed (uncredited) to the screenplay for the 1982 megahit Tootsie, notably the scenes involving the character played by Bill Murray.

Warren Beatty worked with May on the comedy Ishtar (1987), starring Beatty and Dustin Hoffman. Largely shot on location in Morocco, the production was beset by creative differences among the principals and had cost overruns. Long before the picture was ready for release, the troubled production had become the subject of numerous press stories, including a long cover article in New York magazine. Some of the opposition to the film came from David Puttnam, the studio head, making Ishtar a prime example of studio suicide. The advance publicity was largely negative and, despite some positive reviews from the Los Angeles Times and The Washington Post, the film was a box office disaster. The film Ishtar has been positively re-evaluated in the 21st century by multiple publications including the Los Angeles Times, Slate, Indiewire, and The Dissolve. Richard Brody of The New Yorker called Ishtar a "wrongly maligned masterwork" and raved, "There's a level of invention, a depth of reflection, and a tangle of emotions in Ishtar which are reached by few films and few filmmakers."

May acted in the film In the Spirit (1990), in which she played a "shopaholic stripped of consumer power"; Robert Pardi has described her portrayal as a "study of fraying equanimity [that] is a classic comic tour de force." She also contributed to the screenplay for the drama Dangerous Minds (1995). May reunited with her former comic partner, Mike Nichols, for the 1996 film The Birdcage, an American adaptation of the classic French farce La Cage aux Folles. Their film relocated the story from France to South Beach, Miami. It was a major box office hit. May received her second Oscar nomination for Best Screenplay when she again worked with Nichols on the 1998 film Primary Colors.

=== 2000–2018: Return to acting and Broadway ===
May appeared in Woody Allen's Small Time Crooks (2000) where she played the character May Sloane, which Allen named after May when he wrote it, and with May being his first choice for the part. For her acting, she won the National Society of Film Critics award for Best Supporting Actress. Allen spoke of her as a genius, and of his ease of working with her: "She shows up on time, she knows her lines, she can ad-lib creatively, and is willing to. If you don't want her to, she won't. She's a dream. She puts herself in your hands. She's a genius, and I don't use that word casually." Nearly 15 years later, Allen ended up casting her to play his wife, Kay Munsinger, in his Amazon limited series, Crisis in Six Scenes, which was released in 2016.

In 2002, Stanley Donen directed her musical play Adult Entertainment with Jeannie Berlin and Danny Aiello at Variety Arts Theater in Manhattan. May wrote the one-act play George Is Dead, which starred Marlo Thomas and was performed on Broadway from late 2011 into 2012 as part of the anthology play Relatively Speaking along with two other plays by Woody Allen and Joel Coen, directed by John Turturro. Charles Isherwood of The New York Times praised May's entry describing it as "a delicious study in the bliss of narcissism". David Rooney of The Hollywood Reporter concurred describing George is Dead as the "strongest entry". Before he died in 2019, Donen was reported to be in pre-production for a new film, begun December 2013, to be co-written with May and produced by Nichols. A table reading of the script for potential investors included such actors as Christopher Walken, Charles Grodin, Ron Rifkin, and Jeannie Berlin.

When May's lifelong collaborator Nichols died in 2014, May stepped up to poignantly direct the 2016 TV documentary Mike Nichols: American Masters. That same year, she returned to acting, her first role since 2000, starring alongside her friend Woody Allen in his series Crisis in Six Scenes on Amazon Prime, Tim Goodman of The Hollywood Reporter praised their chemistry together writing, "The best episodes are the last two, when Crisis in Six Scenes becomes a full-blown farce and we get to see Allen and May playing accidental aging radicals, shuffling around Brooklyn".

In 2018, aged 86, May returned to Broadway after 60 years in a Lila Neugebauer-directed revival of Kenneth Lonergan's play The Waverly Gallery opposite Lucas Hedges, Joan Allen, and Michael Cera. The play ran at the John Golden Theatre, the same theatre where Nichols and May had started out almost 60 years earlier. May received rapturous reviews for her performance as the gregarious, dementia-ridden elderly gallery owner Gladys Green, with many critics remarking that she was giving one of the most extraordinary performances they had ever seen onstage. The show received a nomination for the Tony Award for Best Revival of a Play, while May herself won the Tony Award for Best Actress in a Play for her performance. She became the second oldest performer to win a Tony Award for acting.

=== 2019–present: Return to directing ===
The proposed stars of Crackpot
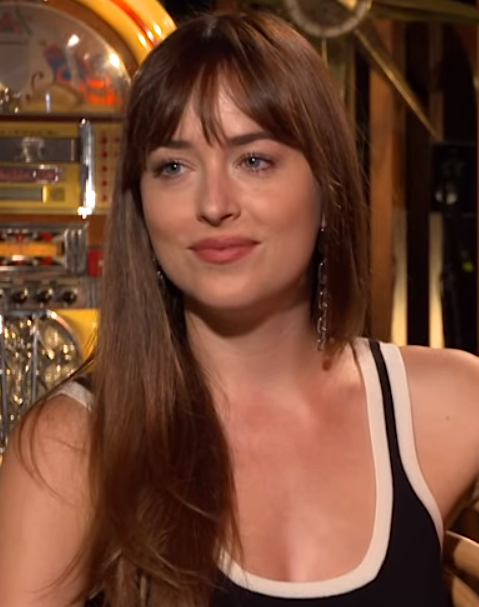
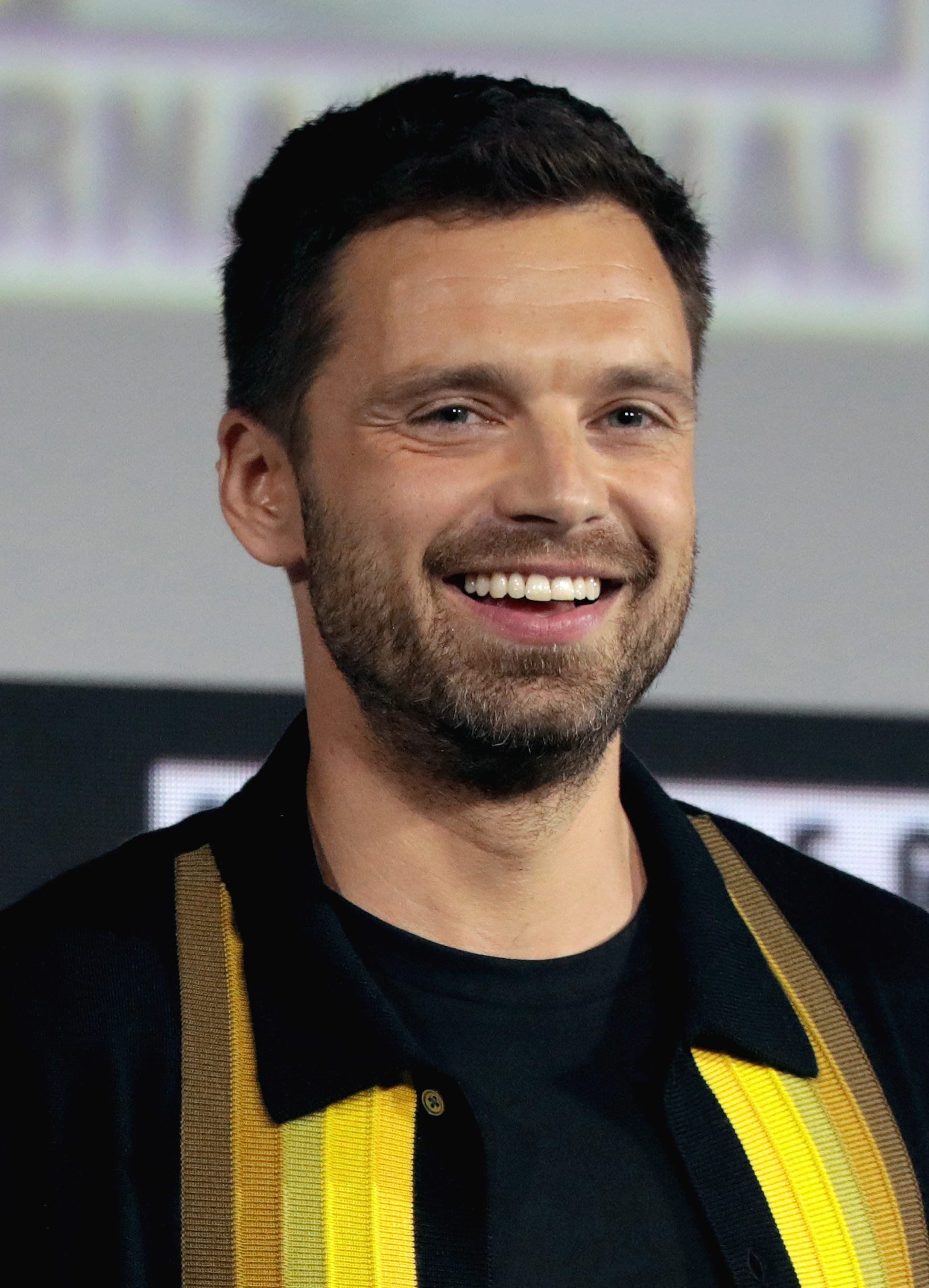
Dakota Johnson and Sebastian Stan

In 2019, it was announced that May is set to direct her first narrative feature in over thirty years. Little is known about the project other than its title, Crackpot, and that it is set to star Dakota Johnson, who announced the project at the 2019 Governors Awards. In 2024, Johnson stated that the film is still in development and she serves as the film's producer and star with May still set to direct. Later that year, Sebastian Stan was also attached to co-star, and said the primary impediment to production at that point was the film's insurers seeking a backup director, due to May's age, who could shadow the production and complete it if May was unable to. It was to begin production in fall 2025, though this never happened due to Johnson's failure to step in as stand-by director; owed to her preoccupation with her directorial debut A Tree Is Blue.

== Influence and legacy ==
Nichols and May created a new "Age of Irony" for comedy, which showed actors arguing contemporary banalities as a key part of their routine. That style of comedy was picked up and further developed by later comics such as Steve Martin, Bill Murray, and David Letterman. According to Martin, Nichols and May were among the first to satirize relationships. The word "relationship," notes Martin, was first used in the early sixties: "It was the first time I ever heard it satirized." He recalls that soon after discovering their recorded acts, he went to sleep each night listening to them. "They influenced us all and changed the face of comedy."

In Vanity Fair, Woody Allen declared, "Individually, each one is a genius, and when they worked together, the sum was even greater than the combination of the parts—the two of them came along and elevated comedy to a brand-new level."

Lily Tomlin was also affected by their routines and considers May to be her inspiration as a comedian: "There was nothing like Elaine May, with her voice, her timing, and her attitude," says Tomlin. "The nuances of the characterizations and the cultured types that they were doing completely appealed to me. They were the first people I saw doing smart, hip character pieces. My brother and I used to keep their 'Improvisations to Music' on the turntable twenty-four hours a day."

In an interview with Pitchfork Magazine, standup comedian John Mulaney described Mike Nichols & Elaine May Examine Doctors (1961) as one of his favorite comedy albums of all time. Mulaney stated, "I got this album for Christmas when I was in junior high. The last track, 'Nichols and May at Work,' is an outtake from recording the album, they were just improvising dialog in a studio. They're trying to do a piece where a son goes to his mother and says that he wants to become a registered nurse. It's something you just have to experience, because two people that funny laughing that hard is really, really, really funny. I think it might be the happiest thing ever recorded."

Filmmaker and film historian Peter Bogdanovich covered Elaine's filmography in his book Movie of the Week (1999). Bogdanovich praised all of her films and concluded with "Long live Elaine! Would that she could act and direct again in pictures. In 1998 I saw her perform off-Broadway in a couple of one-act plays she wrote (Power Plays), and her performances matched the comic genius of the writing." Other admirers of May's work include comedian Patton Oswalt, and directors Ben and Josh Safdie who both detailed their admiration for her and her work, in particular her film Mikey and Nicky (1976) through The Criterion Channel.

May's work as a director has been given a closer look in recent years with David Hudson, a writer for The Criterion Collection declaring her as a "criminally underappreciated moviemaker". In 2017 the Philadelphia Film Critics Circle created an award in her name given "to a deserving person or film that brings awareness to women's issues".

May's life and career are detailed in Miss May Does Not Exist: The Life and Work of Elaine May, Hollywood's Hidden Genius written by Carrie Courogen, which was released in June 2024 by St. Martin's Press, and was nominated for the 2024 National Book Critics Circle's best first book prize. The book takes its title from May's biographical blurb, as it appears on the back of Improvisations to Music.

== Filmography ==
=== Film ===
Year	Title	Director	Writer	Actress	Role	Notes
1967	Enter Laughing	No	No	Yes	Angela Marlowe	
1967	Luv	No	No	Yes	Ellen Manville	
1967	The Graduate	No	No	Uncredited	Girl with note for Benjamin	
1967	Bach to Bach	No	Yes	Yes	Woman	Short film
1971	A New Leaf	Yes	Yes	Yes	Henrietta Lowell	Directorial debut
1971	Such Good Friends	No	Yes	No	—N/a	Under pseudonym, Esther Dale
1972	The Heartbreak Kid	Yes	No	No	—N/a	
1976	Mikey and Nicky	Yes	Yes	Uncredited	Woman on TV (voice)	
1978	Heaven Can Wait	No	Yes	No	—N/a	
1978	California Suite	No	No	Yes	Millie Michaels	
1981	Reds	No	Uncredited	No	—N/a	
1982	Tootsie	No	Uncredited	No	—N/a	
1986	Labyrinth	No	Uncredited	No	—N/a	
1987	Ishtar	Yes	Yes	No	—N/a	
1990	In the Spirit	No	No	Yes	Marianne Flan	
1994	Wolf	No	No	Uncredited	Operator (voice)	
1995	Dangerous Minds	No	Uncredited	No	—N/a	
1996	The Birdcage	No	Yes	No	—N/a	
1998	Primary Colors	No	Yes	No	—N/a	
2000	Small Time Crooks	No	No	Yes	May	
2021	The Same Storm	No	No	Yes	Ruth Lipsman	
TBA	Crackpot	Yes	TBA	No	—N/a	

=== Television ===
Year	Title	Credit(s)	Role	Notes
1958	Omnibus	Performer	Herself	Episode: "The Suburban Review"
1958	DuPont Show of the Month	Actor	Candy Carter	Episode: "The Red Mill"
1959–60	The Tonight Show with Jack Paar	Herself	Guest	5 episodes
1960	What's My Line?	Herself	Mystery Guest	Episode: "Elaine May & Mike Nichols"
1962	President Kennedy's Birthday Salute	Performer	Herself	Television special
1964–65	The Jack Paar Program	Herself	Guest	6 episodes
1966	The Merv Griffin Show	Herself	Guest	Episode: "Peter Falk, Elaine May, & Mike Nichols"
1967	The Smothers Brothers Comedy Hour	Performer	Herself	Episode: #1.9
1996	Nichols and May: Take Two	Herself	Archival footage	American Masters documentary
2008	AFI: Tribute to Warren Beatty	Performer	Herself	Television special
2010	AFI: Tribute to Mike Nichols	Performer	Herself	Television special
2016	American Masters: Mike Nichols	Director	—N/a	Television documentary
2016	Crisis in Six Scenes	Actor	Kay Munsinger	6 episodes
2021	The Good Fight	Actor	Ruth Bader Ginsburg	2 episodes

=== Theatre ===
Year	Title	Credit(s)	Notes
1960	An Evening with Mike Nichols and Elaine May	Playwright, Performer	John Golden Theatre, Broadway
1962	3 x 3	Playwright	Maidman Playhouse, Off-Broadway
1966	The Office	Performer	Henry Miller's Theatre, Broadway
1969	Adaptation	Playwright, Director	Greenwich Mews Theatre, Off Broadway
1980	Who's Afraid of Virginia Woolf?	Performer (Martha)	Long Wharf Theatre
1991	Mr. Gogol and Mr. Preen	Playwright	Newhouse Theatre, Off Broadway
1992	Mike Nichols and Elaine May Together Again	Playwright, Performer	Brooks Atkinson Theatre, Broadway
1995	Death Defying Acts: Hotline	Playwright	Variety Arts Theatre, Off Broadway
1998	Power Plays	Playwright, Performer	Promenade Theatre, Off Broadway
2000	Taller Than a Dwarf	Playwright	Longacre Theater, Broadway
2002	Small Talks on the Universe	Playwright	Eugene O'Neill Theatre, Broadway
2002	Adult Entertainment	Playwright	Variety Arts Theatre, Off Broadway
2005	After the Night and the Music	Playwright	Samuel J. Friedman Theatre, Broadway
2011	Relatively Speaking: George is Dead	Playwright	Brooks Atkinson Theatre, Broadway
2018	The Waverly Gallery	Performer (Gladys Green)	John Golden Theatre, Broadway

== Discography ==
- Improvisations to Music (1958) Mercury ASIN B000W0V9BW
- An Evening with Mike Nichols and Elaine May (1960) Mercury ASIN B000W06CCS
- Mike Nichols & Elaine May Examine Doctors (1961) Mercury MG 20680/SR 60680 ASIN B000W0AGDY
- In Retrospect (1962) Polygram, compilation, re-released as compact disc in 1996 ASIN B000001EKT

== Awards and honors ==
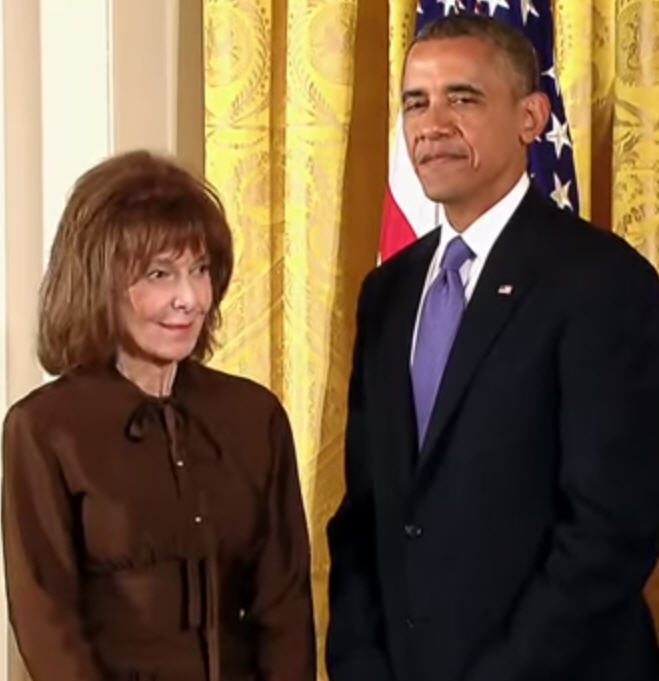
May receiving the Medal of Arts award from President Obama, July 13, 2013

For her acting in films, May's accolades include a nomination for a Golden Globe Award for Best Actress – Comedy or Musical for A New Leaf (1971), and winning the National Society of Film Critics Award for Best Supporting Actress for her role in Small Time Crooks (2000). On stage, May won the Tony Award for Best Actress in a Play for her performance as Gladys in the Broadway revival of Kenneth Lonergan's The Waverly Gallery in 2019. She also received a Drama League Award nomination and won a Drama Desk Award and an Outer Critics Circle Award for Outstanding Actress in a Play. That same year, May's film A New Leaf was selected by the Library of Congress for preservation in the National Film Registry for being "culturally, historically, or aesthetically significant".

May was awarded the National Medal of Arts for her lifetime contributions to American comedy by President Barack Obama, in a ceremony in the White House on July 10, 2013. She was awarded for her "groundbreaking wit and a keen understanding of how humor can illuminate our lives, Ms. May has evoked untold joy, challenged expectations, and elevated spirits across our Nation."

In January 2016, the Writers Guild of America-West announced that May would receive its 2016 Laurel Award for Screenwriting Achievement at the Writers Guild of America Award ceremony in Los Angeles on February 13.

In 2021, she was chosen to receive the Honorary Academy Award by the Board of Governors of the Academy of Motion Pictures Arts and Sciences, receiving the award for her "bold, uncompromising approach to filmmaking, as a writer, director and actress". She was honored at the annual Governors Awards alongside Samuel L. Jackson, Liv Ullmann, and Danny Glover on March 25, 2022. Bill Murray presented her with the award crediting her with "saving his life on multiple occasions professionally".
