= The Waverly Gallery =

Play

- Playbill cover from 2018 Broadway production
- Written by: Kenneth Lonergan

Premiere
- Date: 2000

The Waverly Gallery is a play by Kenneth Lonergan. It is considered a "memory play". The show, first produced Off-Broadway in 2000, follows a grandson watching his grandmother slowly die from Alzheimer's disease. The play was a finalist for the Pulitzer Prize for Drama in 2001.

== Summary ==
Gladys Green owns a small art gallery in Greenwich Village. She is in her 80s and showing signs of Alzheimer's disease. Don, a young artist, arrives for a showing of his work. The landlord wants to close the art gallery and replace it with a restaurant. How her family – daughter Ellen, son-in-law Howard and grandson Daniel – deals with her decline is told by the grandson.

(The minor character of the landlord, onstage at the Williamstown production, was dropped for the Off-Broadway 2000 production. He was included in a later production at the Pasadena Playhouse in 2002.)

== Cast ==
Role	Promenade Theatre Off-Broadway (2000)	John Golden Theatre Broadway (2018)
Gladys Green	Eileen Heckart	Elaine May
Daniel Green	Josh Hamilton	Lucas Hedges
Ellen Fine	Maureen Anderman	Joan Allen
Howard Fine	Mark Blum	David Cromer
Don Bowman	Anthony Arkin	Michael Cera

== Productions ==
The play opened Off-Broadway at the Promenade Theater on March 22, 2000, and closed on May 21, 2000. Directed by Scott Ellis, the play starred Eileen Heckart as Gladys Green and Josh Hamilton as Daniel. The play originally premiered at the Williamstown Theatre Festival, running from August 11, 1999, to August 22, 1999. Joanne Woodward filled in for an ailing Eileen Heckart in the final four performances.

The play premiered on Broadway at the John Golden Theatre on September 25, 2018, in previews, officially on October 25. The cast included Elaine May, Lucas Hedges, Joan Allen, Michael Cera, and David Cromer. The revival was directed by Lila Neugebauer. The play closed on January 27, 2019, after 109 performances.

== Critical reception ==
Charles Isherwood in Variety said, "The life trauma being depicted has an inherent pathos, and in Lonergan's hands, no small amount of comic potential. And yet, while Lonergan mines his subject with delicacy and wit, he runs out of dramatic ore well before the evening's end."

Ben Brantley in The New York Times called the play a "finely observed story of the predations of old age...[it] isn't so much a proper play as an essayistic memoir given dramatic form. It is nonetheless deeply theatrical. Mr. Lonergan ... has one of the keenest ears of any working playwright.... is also often deeply funny."

== Awards and nominations ==
=== 2000 Off-Broadway ===
The Waverly Gallery was a finalist for the Pulitzer Prize for Drama in 2001.

Awards and Nominations:

- The 2000 Drama Desk Awards - Outstanding Actress (Heckart) - Winner
- The 1999–2000 Obie Award - Performance (Heckart) - Winner
- The 2000 Lucille Lortel Award - Outstanding Actress (Heckart) - Winner
- The 2000 Drama League Award - Distinguished Performance (Heckart) - Winner
- The 2000 Outer Critics Circle Award, John Glassner Award (Lonergan) - Nominated

=== 2018 Broadway revival ===
2019 Drama Desk Awards

- Outstanding Revival of a Play - Winner
- Outstanding Actress in a Play (Elaine May) - Winner

2019 Tony Awards

- Tony Award for Best Revival of a Play - Nominated
- Tony Award for Best Actress in a Play (Elaine May) - Winner

On June 9, 2019, May won the Tony Award for Best Actress in a Play for her performance as Gladys in the Broadway revival of Kenneth Lonergan's The Waverly Gallery. She also received a Drama League Award nomination and won a Drama Desk Award and an Outer Critics Circle Award for Outstanding Actress in a Play.[66] That same year, May's film A New Leaf was selected by the Library of Congress for preservation in the National Film Registry for being "culturally, historically, or aesthetically significant".[67]
