= Small Time Crooks =

2000 film by Woody Allen

- Theatrical release poster
- Directed by: Woody Allen
- Written by: Woody Allen
- Produced by: Jean Doumanian
- Starring: Woody Allen; Tony Darrow; Hugh Grant; George Grizzard; Jon Lovitz; Elaine May; Michael Rapaport; Elaine Stritch; Tracey Ullman
- Cinematography: Zhao Fei
- Edited by: Alisa Lepselter
- Production company: Sweetland Films
- Distributed by: DreamWorks Pictures
- Release date: May 19, 2000
- Running time: 95 minutes
- Country: United States
- Language: English
- Budget: $25 million
- Box office: $29.9 million

Small Time Crooks is a 2000 American crime comedy film written and directed by Woody Allen. It stars Allen, Tony Darrow, Hugh Grant, George Grizzard, Jon Lovitz, Elaine May, Michael Rapaport, Elaine Stritch, and Tracey Ullman. The picture's plot has some similarities to that of the 1942 comedy film Larceny, Inc.

Small Time Crooks was the highest-grossing film directed by Allen at the North American box office between Crimes and Misdemeanors (1989) and Match Point (2005). The film was released by DreamWorks Pictures on May 19, 2000, and received positive reviews from critics while grossing $29.9 million against a $25 million budget.

Allen has never said whether the film's similarity to Larceny, Inc. was deliberate or if his film was in any way inspired by it. The plot also parallels episodes of at least two American TV series: Gomer Pyle ("Dynamite Diner") and Car 54, Where Are You? ("The White Elephant"). It is also the last Woody Allen film to have involvement from Jean Doumanian and Sweetland Films.

== Plot ==
Ray Winkler, an ex-convict who lives in a small apartment in Manhattan with his wife, Frances ("Frenchy"), and works as a dishwasher, comes up with a plan to rob a bank by leasing a building that used to house a pizzeria and, with his three cohorts, digging a tunnel to the bank from the building's basement. Frenchy is enlisted to sell cookies upstairs as a front for their scheme. Ray and Frenchy will then live their dream by retiring in Florida.

The robbery scheme soon proves to be a miserable failure, but the cookie business is so successful that Frenchy has to hire her cousin May Sloan as help. May inadvertently gives away the scheme to a police officer, who lets them off in exchange for a piece of the business. A year later, after expanding the cookie business into a franchise, they all become millionaires. Frenchy revels in her newfound wealth and status, but Ray is unhappy, preferring his old life and still dreaming of Florida.

Frenchy throws an extravagant dinner party in their new luxury apartment and overhears people making fun of her poor decorating taste and lack of culture. She approaches art dealer David Perrette and proposes paying him to train her and Ray so they can fit in with the American upper class. David takes them on various cultural outings such as museums and stage plays; Frenchy enjoys herself, but Ray hates every minute of it, eventually ceasing to participate in the outings with them.

David decides to use Frenchy to get her money, hoping to get her to divorce Ray and marry him. Ray spends an evening with May and they commiserate over how much they miss their old lives. David invites Frenchy to go to Europe with him for more cultural enlightenment. When she tells Ray about it, the ensuing argument leads them to get a divorce.

In Venice, Frenchy receives a phone call and is asked to return home urgently. There, she is told she has been defrauded by her accountants, who were running the business on her behalf. She has lost everything—her company, her home, and her savings—and is advised to file for bankruptcy. When David hears the news, he immediately drops Frenchy.

Meanwhile, Ray has gone back to being a crook, planning to steal a valuable necklace from a safe at a house party with May's help. He has a duplicate made, but through a series of circumstances at the party, gets the duplicate and the real necklace mixed up. As he and May are leaving the party, he learns what has happened to Frenchy.

Ray goes to see Frenchy. They say they regret how they acted and are still in love with one another. When she points out that they are broke, he shows her the necklace, still thinking he has the real one, but her newfound cultural knowledge enables her to tell the necklace is a fake; she breaks it to prove to Ray that it is made of glass. However, she then produces a very valuable cigarette case she once gave David as a gift, but stole from him after he dumped her, saying they can sell it and finally retire to Florida. They share a kiss.

== Cast ==
- Woody Allen as Ray Winkler, a.k.a. "The Brain"
- Tony Darrow as Tommy Walker
- Hugh Grant as David Perrette
- George Grizzard as George Blint
- Jon Lovitz as Benjamin "Benny" Bukowski
- Elaine May as May Sloane
- Michael Rapaport as Denny Doyle
- Elaine Stritch as Chi Chi Velasquez Potter
- Tracey Ullman as Frances "Frenchy" Fox-Winkler
- Brian Markinson as Officer Ken DeLoach
- Kristine Nielsen as Emily Bailey
- Larry Pine as Charles Bailey

== Soundtrack ==
- "With Plenty of Money and You" – Music by Harry Warren – Performed by Hal Kemp
- "Could It Be" – Written by Stephen Lang – Performed by Stephen Lang
- "Stompin' at the Savoy" – Written by Edgar M. Sampson, Benny Goodman & Chick Webb – Performed by Benny Goodman and His Orchestra
- "Music Makers" – Written by Harry James & Don Raye – Performed by Harry James
- Voices of Spring Waltzes Frühlingsstimmen op.11 – Written by Johann Strauss – Performed by Vienna State Opera Orchestra
- "Cocktails for Two" – Music by Arthur Johnston – Performed by Carmen Cavallaro
- "Tequila" – Written by Danny Flores – Performed by The Champs
- "The Modern Dance" – Written by Scott Marshall – Performed by Judith Cohn, Carol Genetti & Scott Marshall
- Prelude in B minor opus 32, #10 – Written by Sergei Rachmaninoff
- "Fascination" – Music by Fermo Dante Marchetti – Performed by Carmen Cavallaro
- "Mountain Greenery" – Music by Richard Rodgers – Performed by Lester Lanin
- "Zelda's Theme" – Written by André Previn – Performed by Dámaso Pérez Prado
- Sarabande From the Suite #2 for Solo violoncello In D Minor – Written by Johann Sebastian Bach
- "Lester Lanin Cha-Cha" – Written by Lester Lanin – Performed by Lester Lanin
- "This Could Be the Start of Something Big" – Written by Steve Allen – Performed by Lester Lanin
- "Just in Time" – Music by Jule Styne – Performed by Lester Lanin
- "Old Devil Moon" – Music by Burton Lane – Performed by Lester Lanin
- "The Hukilau Song" – Written by Jack Owens – Performed by Lester Lanin
- "Steady, Steady" – Written by Ronald Graham & Milton Shafer – Performed by Lester Lanin

== Reception ==
=== Box office ===
Small Time Crooks opened up on the same day as Dinosaur and Road Trip and was the highest-grossing film directed by Woody Allen at the North American box office between Crimes and Misdemeanors (1989) and Match Point (2005), with a gross of $17.2 million; the film became profitable for North American distributor DreamWorks Pictures. However, the film was also one of the few later Allen films which did less well outside the U.S. and Canada, and its global gross was $29.9 million.

=== Critical response ===
On the website Rotten Tomatoes, the film holds an approval rating of 66% based on 99 reviews, with an average rating of 7/10. The website's critics consensus reads, "Woody Allen rises from his recent slump with Small Time Crooks. A simple, funny movie, Crooks proves Allen still has the touch that made his name synonymous with off-beat comedy." Metacritic, which uses a weighted average, assigned the film a score of 69 out of 100, based on 32 critics, indicating "generally positive" reviews. Audiences surveyed by CinemaScore gave the film a grade "B" on scale of A to F.

Stephen Holden of The New York Times wrote: "In this sweet, funny wisp of a movie, Mr. Allen shucks off his fabled angst and returns in spirit to those wide-eyed days of yesteryear, before Chekhov, Kafka and Ingmar Bergman invaded his creative imagination."

Todd McCarthy of Variety magazine called it a "Breezy, enjoyable romp gratifyingly zigzags in directions that aren't apparent at the outset and features some intriguingly personal subtext for longtime Woody watchers."

Roger Ebert of the Chicago Sun-Times gave it 3 out of 4, and wrote: "Dumb as they (allegedly) are, the characters in Small Time Crooks are smarter, edgier and more original than the dreary crowd in so many new comedies."

=== Accolades ===
Tracey Ullman was nominated for the Golden Globe Award for Best Actress – Motion Picture Musical or Comedy at the 58th Golden Globe Awards, and Elaine May won the National Society of Film Critics Award for Best Supporting Actress at the 2000 National Society of Film Critics Awards.

== See also ==
- Woody Allen bibliography
- Woody Allen filmography
