= A New Leaf (film) =

1971 film directed by Elaine May

- Theatrical release poster
- Directed by: Elaine May
- Screenplay by: Elaine May
- Based on: "The Green Heart" by Jack Ritchie
- Produced by: Hillard Elkins; Howard W. Koch; Joseph Manduke
- Starring: Walter Matthau; Elaine May; Jack Weston; George Rose; James Coco; William Redfield
- Cinematography: Gayne Rescher
- Edited by: Don Guidice; Fredric Steinkamp
- Music by: Neal Hefti
- Distributed by: Paramount Pictures
- Release date: March 11, 1971
- Running time: 102 minutes
- Country: United States
- Language: English
- Budget: $1.8 million (planned) $4 million (final)
- Box office: $5 million (US/Canada) (rentals)

A New Leaf is a 1971 American black comedy film written and directed by Elaine May in her directorial debut, based on the short story "The Green Heart" by Jack Ritchie. It stars May, Walter Matthau, Jack Weston, George Rose and James Coco.

In the film, patrician New York City playboy Henry Graham has run out of money. He decides to find a wealthy bride, and finds shy heiress Henrietta Lowell. He takes control of her finances after their wedding, and fires her dishonest staff. He carefully plans to poison her, but even his own best laid plans go awry.

The film was a critical success on its initial release. However, despite several accolades, award nominations, and a run at Radio City Music Hall, A New Leaf fared poorly at the box office. However, it is now considered a cult classic. In 2019, the film was selected by the Library of Congress for preservation in the United States National Film Registry for being "culturally, historically, or aesthetically significant".

== Plot ==
Henry Graham, an idle New York patrician, has squandered his entire inheritance and is unequipped to provide for himself. For months, he dodges his exasperated accountant's phone calls, refusing to accept his ruination. His disgusted accountant writes off $550, paid from his own funds, finally to be rid of Henry. Henry's avaricious Uncle Harry, his contemptuous former guardian, rebuffs his appeal to borrow money. Henry's pragmatic valet suggests he marry into wealth. Deciding to marry then murder a wealthy wife, Henry wheedles a $50,000 loan from Uncle Harry to finance his courtship campaign of suitable heiresses. Terms of the usurious loan give Henry only six weeks to repay the money or forfeit everything he owns, worth $500,000 including his prized art collection.

Desperation sets in as several attempts to court a suitable mate fail. With only days remaining, Henry meets the answer to his prayers: clumsy, painfully shy, immensely wealthy Henrietta Lowell, a botany professor with no family. After she embarrasses herself by spilling tea on the carpet at a society party, Henry defends her, drives her home, and feigns interest in her work. Swept off her feet, she agrees to marry him within the week.

Henrietta's suspicious lawyer, Andy McPherson, opposes the union, however, and plots with Henry's uncle to frustrate the marriage plans. The good-natured Henrietta is so guileless that Andy's manipulations backfire. When Andy tells her about the $50,000 loan and the six-week deadline, Henry "reluctantly discloses" that he had intended to settle his debts before ending his life, but meeting Henrietta has made life worth living. When Andy points out that friends will believe Henry is marrying her for her money, Henrietta declares that Henry's debts will be paid before their marriage and he will be given unlimited access to her bank account—in her mind taking away mercenary motives. To Andy's exasperation, the madly-in-love Henrietta marries Henry. On their Caribbean honeymoon, Henrietta discovers what may be an unknown species of fern.

On their return, Henry takes charge of Henrietta's disorganized life. Immersing himself in sorting out Henrietta's accounts, he learns about managing a vast estate and taxes. He immediately fires her 17 household servants, who were colluding with Andy to bilk her through bloated salaries and outrageous expenses. Complicating Henry’s plans to poison Henrietta, the gardener informs him that Henrietta allows only organic gardening methods—no poisons are stocked.

When Henrietta discovers Henry has a Bachelor of Arts in history, she suggests Henry teach at her university, fantasizing about grading papers together in the evenings. He gruffly refuses. Henry hints to his valet that it is nearly time to dispose of his helpless wife; though a competent academic, she is so inept in life skills the valet checks her every morning for breakfast breadcrumbs when she leaves for work. Observing that Henrietta is a kind-hearted lady, the valet makes an appeal that taking care of Henrietta has given Henry a new competence he never had.

Henrietta's fern is confirmed as a new species; she names it Alsophila grahamii for Henry, and he is uncharacteristically touched by the tribute. She invites him to join her on her annual field trip, a canoe expedition in the Adirondacks. Henry sees this as the perfect opportunity to rid himself of her.

Their canoe is capsized by dangerous whitewater. Henry makes it to shore, but Henrietta clings to a fallen log, confessing that she cannot swim. He intends to leave her to her fate, but on the riverbank, he finds a specimen of the fern that Henrietta named after him. Realizing that he has fallen in love in spite of himself, he rescues her and resigns himself to a life together, promising to always be there to take care of her. He even agrees to consider teaching history.

== Cast ==
- Walter Matthau as Henry Graham
- Elaine May as Henrietta Lowell
- Jack Weston as Andy McPherson
- George Rose as Harold
- James Coco as Uncle Harry
- Doris Roberts as Mrs. Traggert
- Renée Taylor as Sharon Hart
- David Doyle as Mel
- William Redfield as Beckett
- Mark Gordon as John

== Production ==
Elaine May wrote A New Leaf from Jack Ritchie's short story "The Green Heart", but she never intended to act in or direct the picture. She was originally offered $200,000 for the script, but her agent cut a deal with Paramount so that May could direct and he could produce. She was paid only $50,000, as her agent convinced her that a first time director could not expect such a large sum of money.

May was told that she could not get the picture made without Walter Matthau, and that Paramount wanted Carol Channing to play the part of Henrietta Lowell. May protested, asserting that it was the man's movie and that the woman had to be someone who disappeared. She asked if she could pick the actress, and the studio declined, saying that instead, May could play Henrietta for the same money. Christopher Plummer and Cary Grant were in contention for the role of Henry Graham.

A New Leaf was filmed in both Maine and sections of New York City, including Lutèce restaurant on 50th Street in Manhattan and the interchange between the Long Island Expressway and Cross Island Parkway in the Oakland Gardens section of Queens. For this film, May consulted Dr. Dominick Basile, a botany professor at Columbia University. Dr. Basile wrote botanically accurate lines for the script and supplied the botanical equipment seen in the film. May also modeled Henrietta's office after his. It was co-produced by Aries Productions and Elkins Productions International Corporation, whose only other production was A Doll's House (1973).

Henry's onscreen home is filled with postwar art that at the time of filming would have been fairly recent. The movie's final credits crawl acknowledges several major New York art galleries - Marlborough Gerson, Inc., Edward R. Lubin, Inc., Andre Emmerich, and French and Company. The artwork most prominently visible in the film is Morris Louis's 1959 painting Multifarious, part of his Themes and Variations series.

=== Financial issues ===
In what would become a hallmark for Elaine May, the film's original $1.8 million budget shot up to over $4 million by the time it was completed. Shooting went 40 days over schedule, and editing took over ten months. Similar problems dogged her subsequent projects, Mikey and Nicky and Ishtar, the latter named by critics at the time as one of the worst films ever made.

During shooting, producer Howard W. Koch tried to have May replaced, but she had put a $200,000 (equivalent to $1.6 million in 2025) penalty clause into her contract, and he was persuaded to keep her.

=== Alternate versions ===
After May would not show Paramount Pictures a rough cut of the film ten months into editing, Robert Evans took away the film from her and recut it, although she had the right to approve the final cut in her contract. May's version was rumored to run 180 minutes, and contained the two murders in Ritchie's story, as well as subplots about misogyny. Evans shortened it to 102 minutes. Angered by the alterations, May tried to take her name off the film, and unsuccessfully sued Paramount to keep it from being released.

The original story included a subplot in which Henry discovers from the household accounts that Henrietta is being blackmailed on dubious grounds by lawyer Andy McPherson (Jack Weston), and another character played by William Hickey. Henry poisons both of them. This darkly casts Henry's eventual acceptance of a conventional life with Henrietta as his "sentence". Paramount eliminated this subplot. (In the early 1990s, head of Paramount Repertory Michael Schlesinger asked that the vaults be searched to see if the trims had survived, in the hopes of restoring May's original cut; nothing was found.)

Roger Ebert of the Chicago Sun-Times discussed this in his review: "Miss May is reportedly dissatisfied with the present version; newspaper reports indicate that her original cut was an hour longer and included two murders. Matthau, who likes this version better than the original, has suggested that writer-director-stars should be willing to let someone else have a hand in the editing. Maybe so. I'm generally prejudiced in favor of the director in these disputes. Whatever the merits of Miss May's case, however, the movie in its present form is hilarious, and cockeyed, and warm."

Vincent Canby of The New York Times remarked, "Not having seen Miss May's version, I can only say that the film I saw should be a credit to almost any director, though, theoretically at least, Miss May is right. The only thing that gives me pause is the knowledge that its success will probably be used in the future as an argument to ignore the intentions of other directors, but with far less happy results."

== Release ==
=== Critical reception ===
The film has received almost universal praise from critics. As of 2024, the film has an approval rating of 94% at review aggregator Rotten Tomatoes, based on 70 reviews. The website's critical consensus reads: "Elaine May is a comedic dynamo both behind and in front of the camera in this viciously funny screwball farce, with able support provided by Walter Matthau."

Roger Ebert of the Chicago Sun-Times gave the film four stars out of four, describing it as "hilarious, and cockeyed, and warm", further stating, "A New Leaf is, in fact, one of the funniest movies of our unfunny age."

In his review for The New York Times, Vincent Canby calls it "a beautifully and gently cockeyed movie that recalls at least two different traditions of American film comedy. The entire project is touched by a fine and knowing madness."

Gene Siskel of the Chicago Tribune called it "one of the funniest and most tender films I have ever seen", and placed the film at #2 on his retrospective list of the best movies of 1971.

Independent critic Leonard Maltin gave the film 2½ stars out of 4, calling it an "amusing comedy" with "many funny moments, and May is terrific, but it's wildly uneven".

Charles Champlin, writing for the Los Angeles Times, stated, "There are occasional moments which don't quite hang together, but the level of successful invention is marvelously high, and A New Leaf achieves the nutty and improbable grandeur of the best movie comedies of the past. Indeed, Elaine May carries us off into this crazy world of her own invention in a way that I'd come to think simply wasn't possible anymore."

Newsday stated, "A New Leaf is continuously enjoyable and frequently brilliant."

=== Awards ===
| Year | Award | Category | Work | Result | Winner | Ref. |
|---|---|---|---|---|---|---|
| 1971 | Golden Globe Awards | Best Motion Picture - Musical or Comedy | A New Leaf | Nominated | Fiddler on the Roof | |
| 1971 | Golden Globe Awards | Best Actress - Musical of Comedy | Elaine May | Nominated | Twiggy, The Boy Friend | |
| 1971 | Writers Guild of America Award | Best Comedy Adapted from Another Medium | Elaine May | Nominated | John Paxton, Kotch | |

- In 2019, the film was selected by the Library of Congress for preservation in the United States National Film Registry for being "culturally, historically, or aesthetically significant".

== See also ==
- List of films cut over the director's opposition
- 1971 in film
- The Heartbreak Kid - May's 1972 follow-up film
