= Castle Hill Productions =

US TV and film distribution company

- Type: Private
- Industry: Film, television
- Founded: 1978; 48 years ago
- Founder: Julian Schlossberg
- Defunct: 2009; 17 years ago
- Fate: Sold to Westchester Films (later purchased by Shout! Factory)
- Successor: Westchester Films (studio); Shout! Studios (library)
- Headquarters: New York City, New York

Castle Hill Productions was an independent television and film distribution company handling classic and independent films whose library spans eight decades.

== History ==
Founded in 1978 by Julian Schlossberg, Castle Hill Productions revived and restored over 200 classic motion pictures, many of which were originally United Artists releases and inherited from the family and/or estates of the films' original producers under the Caidin Film Company.

As the company grew, Castle Hill acquired the rights to many films by John Cassavetes, such as Faces and A Woman Under the Influence. Both Schlossberg and Gena Rowlands (Cassavetes' widow), through their company, Faces Distribution, have worked hard to revive the films for today's audiences in order for them to better appreciate the late director's work.

Castle Hill also bought the rights to many of the films of Elia Kazan and Orson Welles. In addition to their classic films, the company also distributed contemporary films (usually up to ten a year), and has been involved in in-house production, creating documentaries on filmmakers and news events.

The highest grossing contemporary film distributed by Castle Hill Productions was Left Luggage, bringing in $1,113,208.

== Closure and holdings ==
In 2009, Castle Hill closed. Most of their holdings sold to another independent company, Westchester Films, managed by Schlossberg.

Most distribution rights to the Castle Hill library are handled by either Warner Bros., Criterion (via Janus Films), or Image Entertainment.

In 2014, the Westchester/Castle Hill holdings were purchased by entertainment distribution company Shout! Factory.

== Key distributed films of Castle Hill ==
- Stagecoach
- A Night in Casablanca
- A Face in the Crowd
- Othello
- What's Up Tiger Lily
- Breaker Morant
- Baby Doll
- Followers
- Blue Moon
- Finding Home
- Jersey Guy
- Left Luggage
- Who Shot Pat?
