= Julian Schlossberg =

American film producer

Julian Schlossberg (born January 26, 1942) is an American motion pictures, theatre and television producer. He has been a college lecturer and television host regarding films, as well.

== Early life and education ==
Schlossberg was born in New York City to a Ukrainian-Jewish family.

Following a tour of duty in the United States Army, Schlossberg attended college at New York University, graduating with honors.

== Career ==
In 1964 he began his career in television at ABC as an assistant account representative in station clearance. After 10 months, he was promoted to head the department. In 1966 Schlossberg left ABC to become an account executive at Walter Reade Organization in the Television Division. He moved to the Theater division in 1969 as an assistant vice president. He later became the vice president and head film buyer.

In 1974, while working as an executive, Schlossberg began hosting Movie Talk, a four-hour nationally syndicated radio program aired in New York first on WMCA and subsequently on WOR. Over the next nine years, he interviewed hundreds of stars (many of whom rarely did interviews) such as Jack Nicholson, Dustin Hoffman and Warren Beatty. He also hosted Movie Talk on television, which aired in New York and Philadelphia on Wometco Home Theatre.

From 1976 to 1977 Schlossberg served as the vice president of World Wide Acquisition at Paramount Pictures. He was vice president of production in 1977, but in 1978, Schlossberg left Paramount.

=== Castle Hill Productions/Westchester Films/Shout! Factory ===
In 1978, Schlossberg established Castle Hill Productions, a film production and distribution company. They distributed over 500 first run and classic movies to theaters, pay TV, basic cable, home video, TV syndication and other motion picture outlets worldwide. It became one of the largest independent film distribution companies in the world.

Some of the features distributed by Castle Hill are three Elia Kazan features: Face in the Crowd, Baby Doll and America America; John Cassavetes' collection including Woman Under the Influence and Faces; Orson Welles' Othello, Woody Allen's What's Up Tiger Lily?, John Ford's Stagecoach, Alfred Hitchcock's Foreign Correspondent, Bruce Beresford's Breaker Morant, The Marx Brothers' A Night in Casablanca, Hell's Angels on Wheels and Rebel Rousers both starring Jack Nicholson, Glengarry Glen Ross starring Al Pacino, Death of a Salesman starring Dustin Hoffman, Seize the Day starring Robin Williams, presented with Martin Scorsese, Fellini's Intervista, two Academy Award nominees - A Great Day in Harlem and Al Hirschfeld: The Line King, and Academy Award winners Discreet Charm of the Bourgeoisie and Get Out Your Handkerchiefs. Many titles in this library were originally United Artists (UA) releases whose ownership had been passed on to their respective producers (and in some cases, their estates), and later acquired by Stanley Caidin, who in turn established the Caidin Film Company to manage this portion of the UA library.

Schlossberg established himself as a producer's representative for prominent figures such as Elia Kazan, Dustin Hoffman, John Cassavetes, and George C. Scott, Elaine May and Robert Duvall.

In 2006 Schlossberg sold Castle Hill Productions and started two new production and film distribution companies, Jumer Productions Inc. and Westchester Films Inc. Their libraries are managed in part by Janus Films.

Then, in 2014, Schlossberg sold the Westchester company and its library to Shout! Factory, though he will remain with the new owners as an adviser.

=== Record producer ===
Schlossberg also embarked on a career as a record executive when he and partner Danny Goldberg founded Gold Castle Records. The company went on to record artists such as Peter, Paul & Mary, Joan Baez, Don McLean, The Washington Squares, and Judy Collins.

=== Lecturer ===
Schlossberg has lectured about film at New York University, Tufts University, The New School, UCLA, The School of Visual Arts, Columbia University, Judith Crist's Seminar, Rutgers University, Cannes Film Festival and in the People's Republic of China. In 1971 he created and was the key speaker for The Business of Motion Pictures, a course which he ran for five years. Guest speakers included Otto Preminger, David Susskind, Maximilian Schell, Elia Kazan and many others.

=== Current projects ===
Schlossberg has created and is currently producing Witnesses to the 20th Century, a fourteen-hour series that examines the major historical events of the twentieth century from some of the prominent people who lived during it. He is also producing "100 Voices For 100 Years", 100 one-hour interviews with some of the most recognizable people from the 20th century.

Along with Meyer Ackerman he owns the motion picture rights to the musical Carnival based on the motion picture Lili.

He has published two memoirs that cover his entire career in all genres of show business, each with forewords by Elaine May: "Try Not to Hold it Against me: A Producer's life" (Beaufort Publishers, 2023) and "My First Book, Part 2" (Amazon Publications, 2024).

He also started an hour-long podcast in January 2024, "Julian Schlossberg's Movie Talk," in which he interviews international movie stars, writers and directors, many of who he has worked with during the course of his career. Guests have included Woody Allen, Alan Alda, and F. Murray Abraham, winner of the Best Actor Academy Award for [Amadeus] (1986).

== Credits ==
=== Features ===
- Widow's Peak (Executive Producer) starring Mia Farrow, Joan Plowright and Natasha Richardson - New Line feature
- In the Spirit (Producer) starring Peter Falk, Marlo Thomas, Melanie Griffith and Olympia Dukakis - Warner Brothers
- No Nukes (Co-Producer/Co-Director) rock documentary starring Bruce Springsteen, James Taylor, Carly Simon, Bonnie Raitt and Jackson Browne - Warner Brothers
- Bad Girls (Producer) - Trimark Pictures
- Ten from Your Show of Shows (Co-Creator) starring Sid Caesar and Imogene Coca - Continental Films
- Orson Welles' Othello (Presenter)

=== Television ===
- Mike Nichols: American Masters (Producer) - PBS American Masters. Directed by Elaine May - Nominated for an Emmy.
- Nichols & May: Take Two (Producer) about the comedy team of Mike Nichols and Elaine May - PBS American Masters
- The Lives of Lillian Hellman (Producer) - PBS American Masters
- Elia Kazan: A Director's Journey (Producer) nominated for an Emmy Award - AMC
- Claire Bloom's Shakespeare's Women (Producer) - Bravo
- Sex and Justice: The Highlights of the Anita Hill/Clarence Thomas Hearings (Producer/Co-Director) written and hosted by Gloria Steinem
- Going Hollywood: The War Years (Producer/Director) starring Van Johnson - Warner Brothers
- Going Hollywood: The '30s (Producer/Director) starring Robert Preston – AMC
- Hollywood Ghost Stories (Producer) starring John Carradine - HBO
- Hollywood Uncensored (Producer) starring Douglas Fairbanks, Jr. and Peter Fonda - HBO
- Steve Allen's Golden Age of Comedy (Producer) - HBO
- All the Best, Steve Allen (Producer) – HBO
- Slapstick Too (Producer) starring Eli Wallach – Castle Hill Productions

=== Theater ===
- Bullets Over Broadway: The Musical (Producer) written by Woody Allen, directed by Susan Stroman
- Relatively Speaking (Producer) three one acts written by Woody Allen, Ethan Coen and Elaine May, directed by John Turturro
- Sly Fox (Producer) starring Richard Dreyfuss, Eric Stoltz, Bronson Pinchot, written by Larry Gelbart, directed by Arthur Penn
- Fortune's Fool (Producer) starring Alan Bates and Frank Langella, directed by Arthur Penn
- Adult Entertainment (Producer) starring Danny Aiello, written by Elaine May, directed by Stanley Donen
- The Unexpected Man (Producer) starring Alan Bates and Eileen Atkins, directed by Matthew Warchus
- After the Night and the Music (Producer) written by Elaine May directed by Daniel Sullivan
- Madame Melville (Producer) starring Macaulay Culkin and Joely Richardson
- Taller than a Dwarf (Producer) starring Matthew Broderick and Parker Posey
- The Beauty Queen of Leenane (Producer)
- If Love were All (Producer) starring Twiggy and Harry Groener
- Tommy Tune: White Tie and Tails (Producer) starring Tommy Tune
- Power Plays (Producer) starring and written by Alan Arkin and Elaine May
- Death Defying Acts (Producer) three one-act plays by Woody Allen, Elaine May and David Mamet, starring Linda Lavin, directed by Michael Blakemore
- Vita and Virginia (Producer) starring Vanessa Redgrave and Eileen Atkins
- Tennessee Williams Remembered (Producer) starring Eli Wallach and Anne Jackson, directed by Gene Saks
- Below the Belt (Producer) starring Judd Hirsch and Robert Sean Leonard
- Jodie's Body (Producer) starring Aviva Jane Carlin
- Moscow Stations (Producer) starring Tom Courtenay
- The Passion of Frida Kahlo (Producer) starring Priscilla Lopez
- Cakewalk (Producer) starring Linda Lavin
- Word of Mouth (Producer) starring James Lecesne, directed by Eve Ensler
- It had to be You (Producer) starring and written by Renee Taylor and Joseph Bologna
- Moving Right Along (Producer) starring Marlo Thomas and Mark Rydell
- Our Lady of Sligo (Presenter) starring Sinéad Cusack
- The Right Kind of People (Producer) written by Charles Grodin
- Triptych (Producer) starring Ally Sheedy and Margaret Colin
- Street of Dreams (Co-Produced with Mike Nichols) starring James Naughton
- Terms of Endearment (Producer) starring Molly Ringwald.
- My Life on A Diet (Producer) starring Renee Taylor.
- Mornings at Seven (Producer) starring Tony Roberts, Judith Ivey, and Dan Lauria.

== Awards ==
Plays produced by Schlossberg have won many awards including six Tony Awards, two Obie Awards, seven Drama Desk Awards and five Outer Critics Circle Awards.

Schlossberg was awarded an Honorary Doctorate from Mercy University, in May 2025.
