= Staircase (film) =

1969 British film by Stanley Donen

- Theatrical release poster
- Directed by: Stanley Donen
- Screenplay by: Charles Dyer
- Based on: Staircase by Charles Dyer
- Produced by: Stanley Donen
- Starring: Rex Harrison; Richard Burton
- Cinematography: Christopher Challis
- Edited by: Richard Marden
- Music by: Dudley Moore
- Production company: Stanley Donen Films
- Distributed by: 20th Century Fox
- Release date: 20 August 1969 (New York)
- Running time: 96 minutes
- Country: United Kingdom
- Language: English
- Budget: $6,370,000
- Box office: $1,850,000 (US/Canada rentals)

Staircase (also known as L'Escalier) is a 1969 British comedy-drama film directed by Stanley Donen and starring Richard Burton and Rex Harrison. The screenplay was by Charles Dyer, adapted from his 1966 play of the same name.

The film concerns an ageing gay couple who own a barber shop in the East End of London. They discuss their loving but often volatile past together and ponder their possible future without each other, as Charles is about to go on trial for dressing as a woman in public.

The two main characters are named Charles Dyer (the name of the playwright/screenwriter) and Harry C. Leeds, which is an anagram of his name.

== Plot ==
Harry Leeds and Charles "Charlie" Dyer are queer hairdressers who have been a couple for twenty years. They both manage Chez Harry, a barbershop in London's East End, where Harry's bedridden invalid mother stays upstairs. Harry has alopecia and rather than wear a toupée, he wraps a bandage around his head. Charlie is an actor who appeared in one television commercial and constantly flaunts his acting profession every chance he gets. The two men endlessly hurl verbal insults at each other, including over a planned visit by Charlie's daughter Cassy.

One night, Charlie learns he has been summoned to court with a charge of lewd public behavior, for dressing in drag. The next morning, both men take a motorcycle ride to a park and discuss the topic of children. Later that night, Harry tends to his alopecia and reaffirms he will never wear a toupée. The next morning, Charlie visits his mother in a nursing home, though she does not recognize him. Harry consoles Charlie outside, and both men venture to another park filled with young adults. There, Charlie considers the harsh punishment if he is convicted.

On another night, Charlie invites a younger man, Jack, into their apartment. Feeling Charlie has been ungrateful, another argument erupts between the two men, as Harry has grown tired of Charlie airing his acting career and refusing to have Cassy meet him. After Jack leaves, Harry goes into the bathroom where Charlie finds him lying unconscious, though Harry recovers.

The next morning, before Charlie heads for his trial, he contemplates his life without Harry and prays. Harry comes downstairs wearing a dark-haired toupée and asks Charlie for his judgment. Charlie attempts to be kind about it but insults it when Harry prompts him to be honest, and Harry returns to wearing a bandage. Harry asks to accompany Charlie to his trial, but Charlie declines. As Charlie steps out, he calls for Harry and the two walk together.

== Cast ==
- Richard Burton as Harry C. Leeds
- Rex Harrison as Charles Dyer
- Cathleen Nesbitt as Harry's mother
- Beatrix Lehmann as Charles' mother
- Avril Angers as Miss Ricard
- Pat Heywood as Nurse
- Stephen Lewis as Jack
- Gwen Nelson as Matron
- Neil Wilson as Policeman
- Shelagh Fraser as Cub mistress
- Dermot Kelly as Gravedigger
- Jake Kavanagh as Choirboy
- Gordon Heath as Postman
- Michael Rogers as drag singer during opening song
- Royston Starr as drag singer during opening song

== Production ==
Produced by the Royal Shakespeare Company, Charles Dyer's play Staircase premiered on 2 November 1966. It was directed by Peter Hall and starred Paul Scofield and Patrick Magee. Stanley Donen had seen the play and reflected, "The material was superb, both the play and the screenplay. I wanted to make it with Paul Scofield, who played it onstage." Donen then sent the adapted script to Scofield, but he declined as he felt the role required personal interaction with the audience. Donen personally felt Scofield did not want to portray a homosexual on film. Donen then phoned Richard D. Zanuck at Twentieth Century-Fox, explaining his situation. During the call, Donen off-handedly mentioned Richard Burton and Rex Harrison for the two leading roles. Zanuck agreed, and suggested to send them the script. Harrison was paid $1 million, while Burton was paid $1.25 million plus a percentage of the box office gross.

Both actors refused to film in England in order to avoid paying a heavy percentage income tax. Meanwhile, Burton's wife Elizabeth Taylor had stipulated to have The Only Game in Town (1970) filmed in Paris so she would be in close proximity with him. The production sets for Staircase were filmed on sound stages at the Boulogne Studios in Paris.

== Reception ==
=== Box office ===
According to Fox records, the film required $10,675,000 in rentals to break even, and by 11 December 1970, had made $2,125,000. In September 1970, the studio reported a loss of $5,201,000 on the film.

=== Critical reaction ===
Vincent Canby of The New York Times wrote: "Although Burton and Harrison are interesting actors whose styles command attention even when the material does not, 'Staircase' is essentially a stunt movie ... Unlike Harry and Charlie, who eventually come to edgy terms with the emptiness of their lives, I couldn't quite come to terms with the emptiness of the movie.".

Variety wrote that "Harrison and Burton have dared risky roles and have triumphed," but noted that the film "comes uncomfortably close to being depressing."

Roger Ebert gave the film 1 star out 4, calling it "an unpleasant exercise in bad taste...[Donen] gives us no warmth, humor or even the dregs of understanding. He exploits the improbable team of Rex Harrison and Richard Burton as a sideshow attraction."

Gene Siskel of the Chicago Tribune gave it 3 stars out of 4, calling it "a satisfactory film achievement with a very good story. Richard Burton is marvelous in holding up Staircase. Rex Harrison is more of a broken step...[he] swishes and preens too much but controls the part as the movie progresses."

Stanley Kauffmann of The New Republic wrote: "Staircase is a flabby film that, as it goes along, seems to realize its flabbiness and grabs frantically at bits of sordidness to prove that it really is serious.."

Charles Champlin of the Los Angeles Times wrote: "We cannot will ourselves to forget that these are Harrison and Burton playing at being homosexuals. These are performances and even if they are good (as they are) and for the most part quite restrained (as they are), we still look at the craft and not into the tortured soul."

Gary Arnold of The Washington Post wrote: "Artistically, the depressing thing about 'Staircase' is that it has no surprises. We see everything coming a few beats or lines or minutes before the filmmakers and the stars, deliberately planting the clues and laying the groundwork and working up the old momentum, finally throw their best punches."

Penelope Gilliatt of The New Yorker wrote: "Written by someone else and directed by a man more fond, it could have been a love story, and it could have been wonderful. Instead of that, it comes out like some total-immersion course in Camp banter, conceived in a way that keeps signalling the heroes' freakishness. The lack of affection for them makes the film depressing ... Only Burton's acting runs deep and true and comic."

Nigel Andrews of The Monthly Film Bulletin wrote: "It is the air of unreality over the film that makes it finally so unsatisfying—the desultory studio street, the barber's shop permanently empty of customers, the sheer improbability of some of the acting (notably Beatrix Lehmann's grotesque cameo as Charlie's mother). If one were charitable, one could regard the whole thing as a vehicle, an opportunity for Harrison and Burton to show their paces in extravagant character roles ... Neither, however, can quite save the film from its inflated production values and the feeling that it has been cleaned up a little for popular consumption."

Leslie Halliwell said: "Unsatisfactorily opened-out and over-acted version of an effective two-hander play. Oddly made in France, so that the London detail seems all wrong."

== Legacy ==
The play inspired Jean Poiret to write, and star in, La Cage aux Folles, which was itself adapted into a film in 1978, into a musical in 1983, and remade as the 1996 film The Birdcage.

== Bibliography ==
- Silverman, Stephen M (1988). The Fox That Got Away: The Last Days of the Zanuck Dynasty at Twentieth Century-Fox. L. Stuart. ISBN 978-0-818-40485-6.
- Silverman, Stephen M. (1996). Dancing On the Ceiling: Stanley Donen and His Movies. Alfred P. Knopf. ISBN 0-679-41412-6.
