= Staircase (play) =

Play by Charles Dyer

Staircase is a two-character play by Charles Dyer about an ageing gay couple who own a barber shop in the East End of London. One of them is a part-time actor about to go on trial for propositioning a police officer. The action takes place over the course of one night as they discuss their loving but often volatile past together and possible future without each other.

Dyer began writing the play in the summer of 1963, while another of his plays, Rattle of a Simple Man, was enjoying a long West End run. He named his two characters Charles Dyer (after himself) and Harry C Leeds, which is an anagram of his name.

The play was premiered on 2 November 1966 at London's Aldwych Theatre. Produced by the Royal Shakespeare Company, it was directed by Peter Hall and starred Paul Scofield and Patrick Magee.

The Broadway production, directed by Barry Morse, opened on 10 January 1968 at the Biltmore Theatre, where it played for 12 previews and 61 performances. It starred Eli Wallach and Milo O'Shea. O'Shea was nominated for the Tony Award for Best Performance by a Leading Actor in a Play.

In June 2021, Two’s Company revived the play at Southwark Playhouse, London. Reviewing it for Everything Theatre, Darren Luke Mawdsley called it "the perfect reminder that the freedoms enjoyed today can never be taken for granted".

The play was profiled in William Goldman's book The Season: A Candid Look at Broadway.

French actor and playwright Jean Poiret had the idea of writing his 1973 play La Cage aux Folles, a farce about a middle-aged gay couple - later adapted into a 1978 film and a 1983 American musical - after seeing a French production of Staircase.

== Film adaptation ==
The play was adapted into a 1969 film by 20th Century Fox, also written by Dyer and directed by Stanley Donen, starring Rex Harrison and Richard Burton as the couple. The film was considered a critical and commercial failure.
