= Charles Dyer (playwright) =

English playwright, actor, and screenwriter (1928–2021)

- Born: Charles Raymond Dyer; 7 July 1928; Shrewsbury, England
- Died: 23 January 2021 (aged 92)
- Occupations: playwright, actor and screenwriter
- Spouse: Fiona Jean Thomson

Charles Raymond Dyer (7 July 1928 – 23 January 2021) was an English playwright, actor and screenwriter.

== Life and career ==
His first appearance was in 1948, at the Whitehall Theatre. His first play "Who On Earth", was published in 1953.

He died in January 2021 at the age of 92.

== Theatre ==
- 1948: Clubs Are Sometimes Trumps
- 1951: Who on Earth?
- 1953: Turtle in the Soup
- 1954: Jovial Parasite
- 1955: Single Ticket to Mars
- 1956: Wanted, One Body!
- 1956: Time, Murderer, Please
- 1957: Poison in Jest
- 1959: Prelude to Fury
- 1960: Red Cabbage and Kings
- 1962: La Crécelle (Rattle of a Simple Man)
- 1964: Gorillas Drink Milk
- 1966: Staircase; the French adaptation L'Escalier inspired Jean Poiret to write the comic play La Cage aux Folles
- 1971: Mother Adam
- 1975: A Hot Godly Wind
- 1980: Futility Rites
- 1983: Lovers Dancing

== Filmography ==
Scriptwriter

- 1964: Rattle of a Simple Man directed by Muriel Box
- 1965: The Knack ...and How to Get It, directed by Richard Lester
- 1969: Staircase by Stanley Donen, adapted from his own theatre play
- 1974: La Crécelle (TV) by Roger Kahane

Actor

- 1963: The Mouse on the Moon (film)
- 1964: Rattle of a Simple Man from Muriel Box: Chalky
- 1964: A Christmas Night with the Stars (TV)
- 1965: The Knack ...and How to Get It (The Knack ... and How to Get It) by Richard Lester: The man in the photo booth
- 1967: How I won the war (How I Won the War) by Richard Lester: The man in the pants
