= Ambra Danon =

Italian costume designer (died 2023)

- Died: 12 April 2023 (aged 75)
- Occupation: Costume designer
- Notable work: La Cage aux Folles

Ambra Danon (died 12 April 2023) was an Italian costume designer. She was nominated for an Academy Award for Best Costume Design, which she shared with Piero Tosi for their work on Édouard Molinaro's comedy film La Cage aux Folles (1978).

Danon died on 12 April 2023 in Rome after a long battle with cancer.
