= Benny Luke =

American-French actor (1939–2013)

- Born: 4 March 1939; Oakland (United States)
- Died: 13 January 2013 (aged 73); Paris
- Occupations: Actor; Dancer
- Known for: La Cage aux folles Spermula

Benny Luke (4 March 1939 in Oakland, California – 13 January 2013) was an American-French actor and dancer established in Paris.

He is best known for playing the role of Jacob, the domestic servant of Renato and Albin in the trilogy of films La Cage Aux Folles. He also had a role in the film Spermula.

As a dancer, he mainly made his career in Parisian cabarets.

He died on 13 January 2013 and was cremated at Père-Lachaise cemetery on 17 January.

== Filmography ==
Year	Title	Role	Notes
1971	Le feu sacré	Danseur 'Pulsations'	
1976	Spermula	Luc	
1978	La Cage Aux Folles	Jacob	
1980	La Cage aux folles 2	Jacob	
1985	La Cage aux folles 3	Jacob	
