= La Cage aux Folles (play) =

Play written by Jean Poiret

- Original language: French
- Written by: Jean Poiret
- Characters: Georges; Albin "Zaza"; Francis; Salomé; Jacob; Mercédès; Mr. Tabaro; Zorba; Laurent; Mr. Languedoc; Mr. Dieulafoi; Mrs Dieulafoi; Muriel; Simone
- Genre: Comedy; farce
- Setting: a nightclub in St. Tropez, France.

Premiere
- Date: 1973
- Place: Théâtre du Palais-Royal; Paris, France

La Cage aux Folles ([la kaʒ o fɔl], lit. 'The Fairies' cage' or 'The Queens' cage') is a 1973 French theatrical farce by Jean Poiret whose protagonists are a middle-aged gay couple, Georges and Albin. A major success of the French theatre during its original run, the play was adapted into a film and later as an American musical, with both becoming commercial phenomena. With its adaptations becoming international hits, the play itself has endured and seen numerous revivals and translations, as well as an American remake of the film.

== Premise ==
Georges is the owner of 'La Cage aux Folles', a drag nightclub downstairs from his and Albin's apartment, where Albin is the main attraction under the persona Zaza Napoli. The story centers on the confusion that ensues when Laurent, Georges's son from a brief heterosexual fling, brings his fiancée's ultraconservative parents for dinner. To avoid ruining Laurent's relationship, Georges and Albin must hide their sexual orientation. After Georges's attempts at coaching Albin to appear more masculine prove unsuccessful, they end up masquerading as a heterosexual couple; Albin has to pass as an actual woman, which involves toning down his usual stage mannerisms.

== Original run ==
Jean Poiret had the idea to write La Cage aux Folles when he saw a French version of the British play Staircase, about an aging gay couple. One inspiration for the story's settings was the Paris drag cabaret Chez Michou. The original French production, directed by Pierre Mondy, premiered at the Théâtre du Palais-Royal in Paris on 1 February 1973. The main roles were originally played by Poiret as Georges and Michel Serrault as Albin/Zaza. The play was a major success in France, where it ran for over 1,500 performances. Poiret stepped down from his role after the thousandth performance, and was replaced by several successive actors. Despite the play's success, the performance of the original cast was famously never filmed in its entirety. The play was reprised in Paris in 1978 at the Théâtre des Variétés, with Serrault returning in his role and Michel Roux as Georges.

The play was controversial at the time among the French gay community, where some found the portrayals insulting while others appreciated the humor and characters. The use of the word folles (literally, madwomen - French slang for queens or fairies) was found demeaning by some, but it was also embraced at the time by gay activists. In retrospect, the play is considered to have had a positive effect on the visibility and acceptance of gay people in France. Overall, despite the farcical tone, Georges and Albin are sympathetic protagonists, whose relationship is meant to be relatable; together, they raised Georges's biological son after the boy's mother abandoned him. While it has been argued that some of the play's humor is dated, particularly concerning the character of the couple's black house servant, La Cage aux Folles has endured as a classic of the French farce genre.

== Adaptations ==
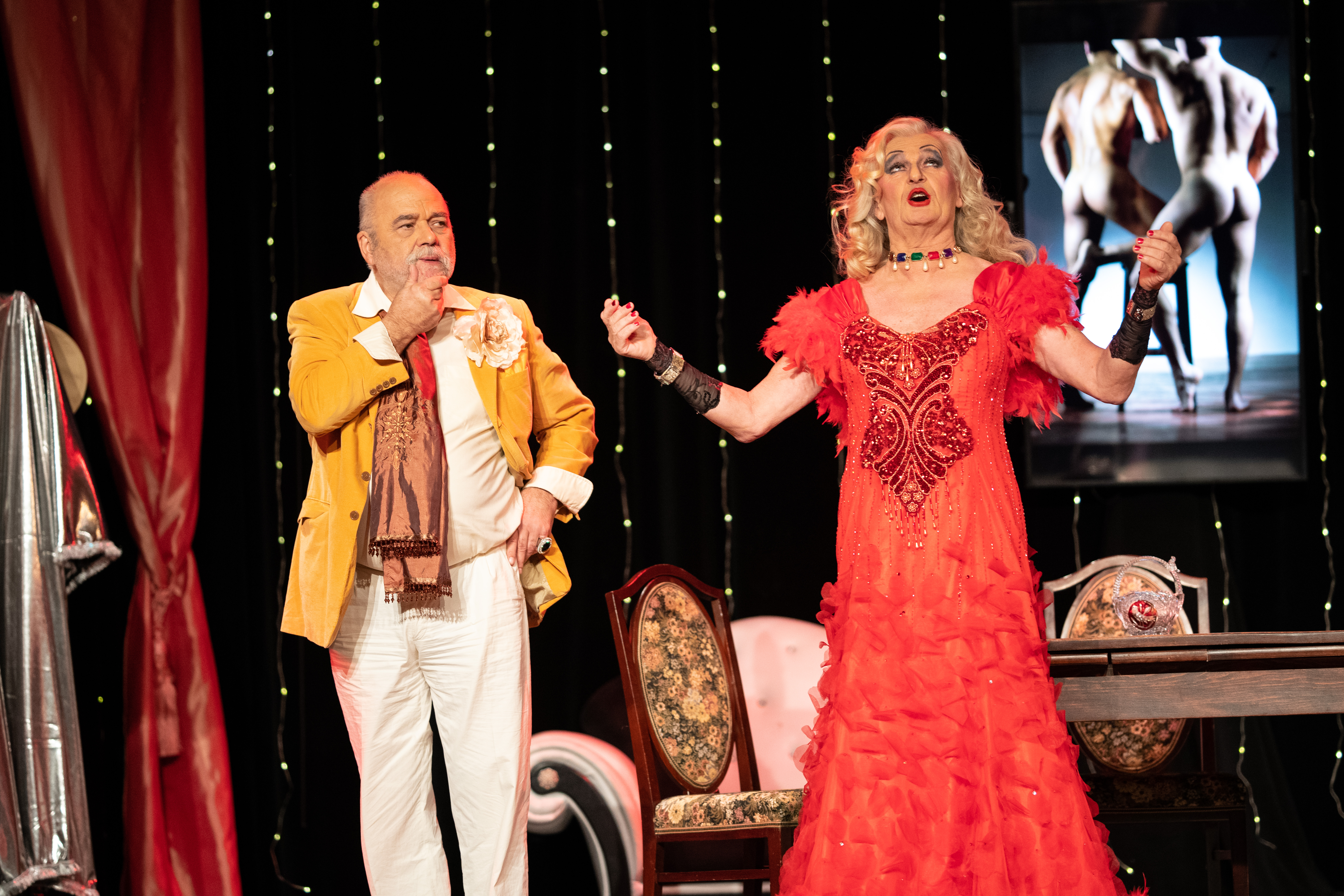
Performance of a German-language version of the play in Purkersdorf, Austria, in 2019.

The play was translated and adapted in various languages. A French-Italian film adaptation, directed by Édouard Molinaro, was made in 1978. A massive box-office success, it was followed by two sequels, La Cage aux Folles II (1980), also directed by Molinaro and La Cage aux Folles 3: 'Elles' se marient (1985), directed by Georges Lautner. Serrault reprised his role in all three films, whereas the character originated onstage by Poiret was portrayed by Ugo Tognazzi and consequently changed to an Italian named Renato.

In 1983, Poiret's play was adapted in the United States as a musical with a book by Harvey Fierstein and music and lyrics by Jerry Herman. The American musical was later adapted into French, premiering in Paris in 1999; a new French version premiered in 2025. The 1978 film adaptation was itself remade as the 1996 American film The Birdcage, starring Robin Williams and Nathan Lane in the roles originated on stage by Poiret and Serrault.

The play was reprised on stage several times in France, including a run that started in 2009 with Christian Clavier and Didier Bourdon at the Théâtre de la Porte Saint-Martin. A new English translation by actor Simon Callow premiered at the Park Theatre (London) in 2020.
