= The Birdcage =

1996 film by Mike Nichols

- Theatrical release poster
- Directed by: Mike Nichols
- Screenplay by: Elaine May
- Based on: La Cage aux Folles by Jean Poiret; La Cage aux Folles by; Francis Veber; Édouard Molinaro; Marcello Danon; Jean Poiret
- Produced by: Mike Nichols
- Starring: Robin Williams; Gene Hackman; Nathan Lane; Dianne Wiest
- Cinematography: Emmanuel Lubezki
- Edited by: Arthur Schmidt
- Music by: Jonathan Tunick
- Production companies: United Artists; Nichols Film Company
- Distributed by: MGM/UA Distribution Co. (United States); United International Pictures (International)
- Release date: March 8, 1996
- Running time: 117 minutes
- Country: United States
- Language: English
- Budget: $31 million
- Box office: $185.3 million

The Birdcage is a 1996 American comedy film produced and directed by Mike Nichols. Elaine May's screenplay adapted the 1978 French-Italian film La Cage aux Folles, itself an adaptation of a 1973 French play. It stars Robin Williams and Nathan Lane as Armand and Albert Goldman, a gay couple whose son Val (Dan Futterman) is set to marry Barbara Keeley (Calista Flockhart), the daughter of conservative senator Kevin (Gene Hackman) and his wife Louise (Dianne Wiest). Hank Azaria and Christine Baranski appear in supporting roles. The film marked the first screen collaboration of Nichols and May, who had been a comedy duo in the 1950s and 1960s.

The Birdcage was released by MGM/UA Distribution Co. in the United States and by United International Pictures in international markets on March 8, 1996, to positive reviews and significant commercial success. It debuted at the top of the North American box office and stayed there for the following three weeks, grossing $185.3 million worldwide on a $31 million budget. It is seen as groundbreaking because it was one of few films from a major studio to feature LGBT characters at its center. The cast received notable praise and was awarded the Screen Actors Guild Award for Outstanding Performance by a Cast. The Birdcage also received a nomination for Best Art Direction at the 69th Academy Awards.

== Plot ==
Armand Goldman is the openly gay owner of a drag club in South Beach called The Birdcage; his effete and flamboyant partner Albert is the star attraction of the club under the name Starina. They live together in an apartment above The Birdcage with Agador, an equally flamboyant Guatemalan housekeeper who aspires to be in Armand's drag show.

Armand's 20-year-old son Val, who is the product of Armand's drunken one-night stand with a woman named Katharine Archer, returns home to announce that he is engaged to be married to a young woman named Barbara Keeley. Although Armand and Albert are both less than happy about the news, they agree to support Val.

Barbara's parents are the Republican Senator Kevin Keeley, co-founder of a socially conservative group called the Coalition for Moral Order, and his equally ultraconservative wife Louise. To conceal the truth about the Goldmans, she has told her parents that Armand is heterosexual and married to a woman, named Coleman (to hide that they are Jewish) and is a cultural attaché to Greece. Kevin initially opposes Barbara's engagement. However, he soon becomes embroiled in a political scandal when the Coalition's co-founder and Kevin's fellow senator Eli Jackson is found dead in the bed of an underage Black prostitute. Louise convinces him that Barbara's wedding will shore up his image as an upright family man, but the Senator is concerned that Val's family will refuse to let it go ahead because of the scandal, and so insists that they cannot announce the engagement to the press until he has spoken to Val's parents and can be sure the wedding will go ahead. To this end, the Keeleys plan a visit to South Beach.

Barbara informs Val of her father's plan. Armand dislikes the idea of being forced into the closet, but agrees to play along, enlisting the help of friends and club employees to redecorate the apartment to more closely resemble a traditional household. Val and Armand attempt to keep Albert out of the house, but when they fail, Albert suggests that he will pose as Val's heterosexual uncle. Armand contacts Katharine and explains the situation; she promises to come to the party and pretend to be his wife. Armand tries to coach Albert on how to act straight, but Albert's flamboyant nature makes the task difficult. Armand realizes that his plan will not fool anyone. Albert takes offense and locks himself in his room.

The Keeleys arrive at the Goldmans' redecorated apartment; they are greeted by Agador, who is attempting to pass as a Greek butler named Spartacus for the night. Katharine gets caught in traffic, and the Keeleys begin wondering where "Mrs. Coleman" is. Suddenly, Albert enters, dressed and styled as a conservative middle-aged woman. Armand, Val, and Barbara are nervous, but Kevin and Louise are fooled by the disguise.

Despite the success of the evening, trouble begins when tabloid journalist Harry Radman and his photographer, who have followed the Keeleys to South Beach after bribing the senator's chauffeur for their destination, pay him again to reveal which building the Keeleys entered. While they research The Birdcage, they also remove a note that Armand has left on the door informing Katharine not to come upstairs. When she arrives, she unknowingly reveals the deceptions, leading Val to confess to the scheme, finally identify Albert as his true maternal parent, and reveal Armand and Albert as gay men.

Kevin is initially confused by the situation, but Louise informs him of the truth and scolds him for being more concerned with his career than his family's happiness. When attempting to leave, he is ambushed by the paparazzi camped outside to take his picture. Albert realizes that there is a way for the family to escape without being recognized. He dresses them in drag, and they use the apartment's back entrance to sneak into The Birdcage, where, by dancing to Sister Sledge's "We Are Family", they make their way out of the nightclub without incident. Barbara and Val are married in an interfaith service that both families attend.

== Cast ==
- Robin Williams as Armand Goldman
- Gene Hackman as Senator Kevin Keeley
- Nathan Lane as Albert Goldman
- Dianne Wiest as Louise Keeley
- Hank Azaria as Agador
- Christine Baranski as Katharine Archer
- Dan Futterman as Val Goldman
- Calista Flockhart as Barbara Keeley
- Tom McGowan as Harry Radman
- Grant Heslov as photographer
- Luca Tommassini as Celcius
- J. Roy Helland as club hostess
- David Sage as Senator Eli Jackson
- Jay Leno as himself (uncredited)

== Production ==
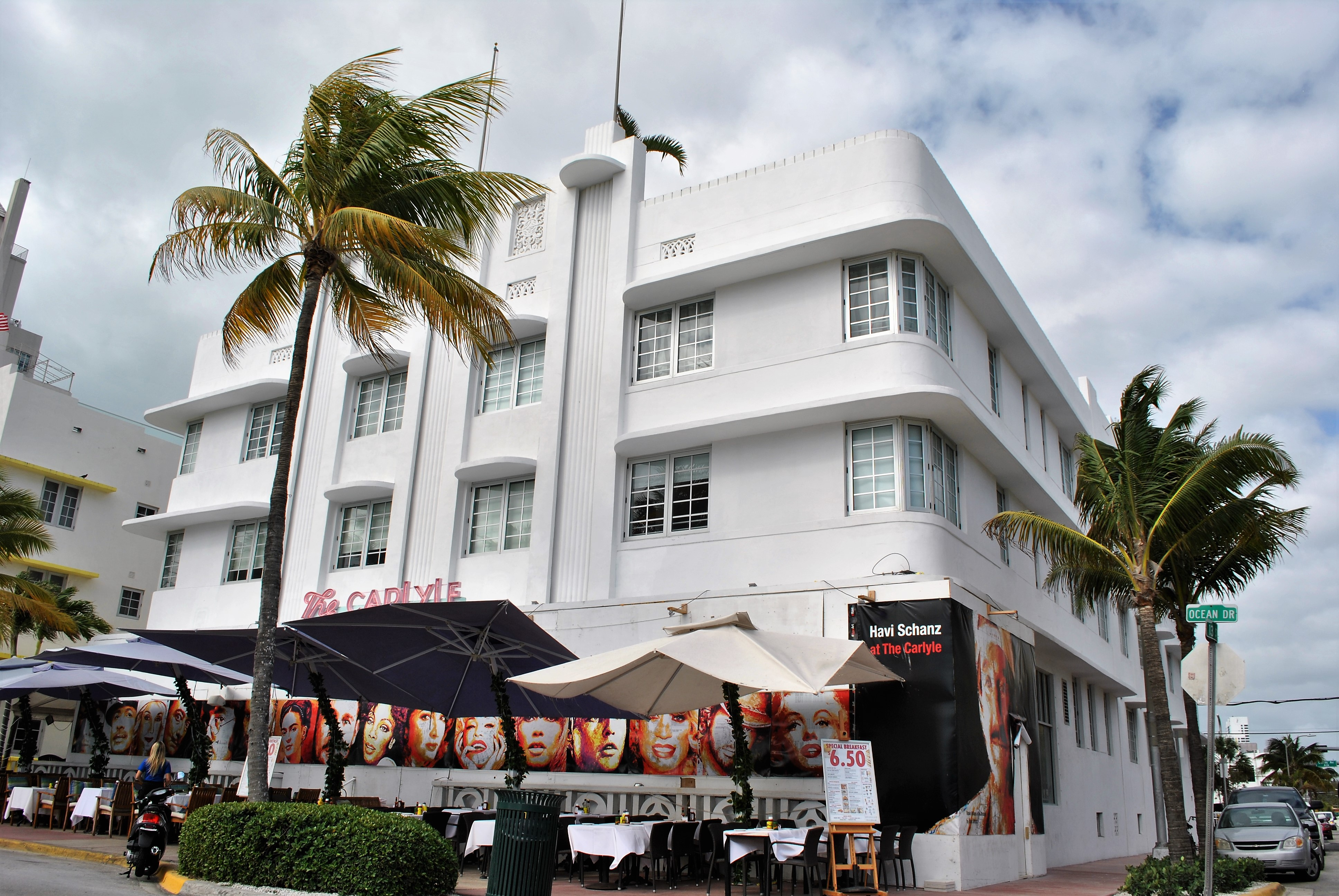
The Carlyle Hotel on Ocean Drive in South Beach served as the exterior stand-in for the film's namesake club during shooting.

=== Development and writing ===
Mike Nichols was originally involved as the director of the 1983 Broadway adaptation of La Cage aux Folles, but was fired from the production by producer Allan Carr. In 1994, Nichols convinced John Calley, then the head of United Artists, who owned the rights to the original 1978 film version, to renew the option with him as a director and producer. Calley, a longtime friend of Nichols, said, "I asked Mike if there was anything we owned that interested him. And he said, 'You own a project that has one of the greatest comedy structures.' We got the rest of the rights, and he said he wanted to call Elaine and ask her to do it. The next day she said yes."

Among the changes that Elaine May added to the film's plot was renaming the character of Georges to Armand Goldman and Albin to Albert. She also adapted the plot line about the potential in-law characters as conservative Moral Majority politician Kevin Keeley and his wife Louise, to address right-wing anti-LGBT sentiment that was in the news at that time.

Nichols did research for the film by traveling with May and production designer Bo Welch to drag shows in Chicago and Savannah. After going to a drag show in South Beach at Welch's suggestion, Nichols decided to change the film's setting from New Orleans to South Beach.

=== Casting ===
Nichols envisioned Robin Williams and Steve Martin in the roles of Albert and Armand, respectively, but Martin turned it down because he did not think that he would be able to bring the camp quality required for the part, and Williams did not want to play Albert because he had already played the flamboyant character Daniel Hillard/Euphegenia Doubtfire in Mrs. Doubtfire. When Williams decided that he wanted to play Armand, Nichols settled on Nathan Lane as Albert. Lane had already committed to starring in a Broadway production of A Funny Thing Happened on the Way to the Forum, but Nichols convinced producer Scott Rudin to postpone the musical so that Lane could star in the film. Gene Hackman said that taking a role in the cast was an opportunity for him to return to his improvisational comedy roots.

Nichols originally conceived of British actor Adrian Lester in the role of Agador, but reworked the role after he and Lester came to a mutual agreement that showing a Black person in the role of a housekeeper would connote racist undertones. Hank Azaria, who was eventually cast, said, "I worked up different versions [of Agador]. One was more understated, barely obviously gay, almost a street tough. And one was the character that ended up in the movie. Both felt real to me—I had grown up with Puerto Rican street queens who were very effeminate and flamboyant and others who weren't. I tried both versions out for a friend who was a drag queen, asked which one he liked better, and got his seal of approval."

=== Filming ===
Williams and Lane, both known for being comic improvisers, were allowed to improvise during weeks-long rehearsals before filming. Nichols and May took the best parts from the rehearsals because Nichols wanted to shoot the film like a play, without too much editing.

Although filming primarily took place in Los Angeles, exterior shots included the Carlyle Hotel in Miami Beach, Ocean Drive, and the Art Deco District.

Although the studio had initial reservations about the film's politics, particularly its portrayal of conservative characters, Calley said, "Mike anticipated [the concerns] eight or nine months ago. He said, 'By the time the movie comes out, you won't be able to parody these guys anymore; they'll be parodying themselves.'"

== Soundtrack ==
The Birdcage: Original United Artists Motion Picture Soundtrack

Soundtrack album by various artists
- Released: May 21, 1996
- Genres: Dance/club, disco, R&B
- Label: Edel America

Professional ratings
Review scores
Source	Rating
AllMusic	3/5 stars

Three songs written by Stephen Sondheim were adapted and arranged for the film by composer Jonathan Tunick. Albert's first song (as Starina) is "Can That Boy Foxtrot", cut from Sondheim's Follies. "Little Dream" was written specifically for the film, ultimately used during Albert's rehearsal with Celcius (Luca Tommassini), the gum-chewing dancer. While Armand and Katharine Archer (Christine Baranski) dance in her office, they sing "Love Is in the Air", cut from A Funny Thing Happened on the Way to the Forum.

In addition to Sondheim's contributions, Tunick utilized popular dance and disco hits, such as Donna Summer's "She Works Hard for the Money" and Sister Sledge's "We Are Family", along with Gloria Estefan and Miami Sound Machine's "Conga".

=== Track listing ===
1. "We Are Family" - Goldman Girls
2. "William Tell Overture" - Stephen Goldstein
3. "She Works Hard for the Money" - Donna Summer
4. "Can That Boy Foxtrot" - Nathan Lane
5. "Mi Guajira" - Cachao
6. "Little Dream" - Nathan Lane
7. "No Pain For Cakes" - The Lounge Lizards
8. "Love Is in the Air" - Christine Baranski, Robin Williams
9. "I Could Have Danced All Night" - Hank Azaria, Gene Hackman, Nathan Lane, Robin Williams, Dianne Wiest
10. "We Are Family (Reprise)" - Goldman Girls
11. "Family Salsa" - Stephen Goldstein
12. "Conga" - Gloria Estefan and Miami Sound Machine

== Reception ==
=== Box office ===
The Birdcage opened on March 8, 1996, and earned $18,275,828 in its opening weekend, topping the box office. It remained on top for the next three weeks before being dethroned by Primal Fear and A Thin Line Between Love and Hate. By the end of its 14-week run, the film had grossed $124,060,553 domestically and $61,200,000 internationally, eventually reaching a worldwide total of $185,260,553.

=== Critical response ===
The Birdcage received positive reviews on release. On the review aggregation website Rotten Tomatoes, the film holds an 85% approval score, based on reviews from 65 critics, with an average rating of 7/10. The site's critical consensus reads: "Mike Nichols wrangles agreeably amusing performances from Robin Williams and Nathan Lane in this fun, if not quite essential, remake of the French-Italian comedy La Cage aux Folles." Metacritic reports a score of 72/100 based on reviews from 18 critics, indicating "generally favorable reviews".

Film critic Roger Ebert of the Chicago Sun-Times awarded the film three stars out of four, writing that while the material will be familiar to those who have seen the original 1978 film or its Broadway incarnation, "what makes Mike Nichols'[s] version more than just a retread is good casting in the key roles, and a wicked screenplay by Elaine May, who keeps the original story but adds little zingers here and there ('Live on Fisher Island and get buried in Palm Beach - that way you'll get the best of Florida!')".

In his review for The Washington Post, Hal Hinson noted the film's subversiveness, commenting, "While politicians like Keeley talk a good game of family values, it's Armand and his nontraditional clan who have the stable home life. They are a family."

Desson Thomson of The Washington Post described the film as "a spirited remake of the French drag farce [that] has everything in place, from eyeliner to one-liner".

Owen Gleiberman of Entertainment Weekly called the film "Enchantingly witty".

In Variety, Todd McCarthy called the movie "a scream", adding, "Just as in their routines when they were a team in the late 1950s and early 1960s, Nichols and May are at their best with political and cultural humor. A reactionary politician is an easy target, of course, but the digs at Hackman's public image-obsessed senator are relentlessly clever and on the mark, as are the jibes at unscrupulous journalists. Final exchange of dialogue, involving Hackman's character, brings down the house in the manner of the famous 'nobody's perfect' line in Some Like It Hot." McCarthy concluded, "Lane has all the showy opportunities as the ultra-feminine Albert, and this outstanding Broadway star, little seen up to now in films, makes the most of them, mincing, pouting, posing and cavorting to hilarious and heartwarming effect. Although the gay lifestyles on display here are decidedly old school, the characters' underlying fierce pride, along with the piece's resilient defense of an alternative family structure, will win over all but the most doctrinaire political standard-bearers."

James Berardinelli wrote in ReelViews, "The film is so boisterously entertaining that it's easy for the unsuspecting viewer not to realize that there's a message here."

Janet Maslin of The New York Times gave the film a positive review, especially praising Williams's performance: "...this is one of his most cohesive and least antic performances. It's also a mischievously funny one: He does a fine job of integrating gag lines with semi-serious acting..."

In his review for The Advocate, Lance Loud commented, "Taking on the conservative agenda—more prevalent in our culture today than when the original film came out in 1979—The Birdcage goes beyond mere politics." He concluded that the film's "underlying feelings of compassion, tolerance, and understanding are this Bird's brightest plumage".

=== Gay community ===
Criticisms from the gay community opined that the film contained broad stereotypes of gay people, particularly in its depiction of effeminate gay men. In The New York Times, critic Bruce Bawer wrote that the film reinforces stereotypes that "homosexuals are marginal, superficial creatures with plenty of disposable income and relationships that aren't as solid as heterosexual marriages". In response to the criticisms, Nichols stressed that the film is not meant to reflect the gay community as a whole, commenting, "Our jokes were about divas, about the theater, and about the stars. And some critics responded as if they were about gay people in general. That just isn't so."

The Gay & Lesbian Alliance Against Defamation (GLAAD) praised the film for "going beyond the stereotypes to see the characters' depth and humanity. The film celebrates differences and points out the outrageousness of hiding those differences." The film was also nominated for a GLAAD Media Award for Outstanding Film – Wide Release.

== Legacy ==
The Birdcage represented a major turning point for media portrayal of LGBTQ people. The Adventures of Priscilla, Queen of the Desert and To Wong Foo, Thanks for Everything! Julie Newmar also featured drag queens and were released prior to The Birdcage, but did not achieve the same level of box-office success, and studio films centering on gay people to that point, such as Philadelphia, tended to focus on tragic stories concerning HIV/AIDS. Academic Matthew Jones said that the arrival of The Birdcage, a comedy that celebrated being gay, "helped an audience traumatised by a decade of living day-to-day with the threat of disease and death to laugh again". In 2021, Emily Maskell of the BBC wrote, "What is particularly astute about the film's comedy is the way in which it mixes its farcical hijinks with a satirical intent, taking aim at both homophobia and the crisis of masculinity, as it navigates the infiltration of conservatism into a liberal space."

Many critics have said that the film's resonance is due to its core theme of family, its depiction of a loving, long-term relationship between two men, and the parents ultimately coming together to make their children happy. Nathan Lane commented, "Homophobia is still alive and well but there's something about that film that touches people because it's ultimately about family, what you do for your family, why you love your family even though they drive you crazy. Then ultimately — not to sound corny — it's about love. It's about love in both families and coming to accept one another in their differences."

For the film's 25th anniversary in 2021, TCM and Fathom Events screened The Birdcage theatrically as part of their Big Screen Classics series.

== Accolades ==
Association	Ceremony Date	Category	Recipient	Results
20/20 Awards	2017	Best Costume Design	Ann Roth	Nominated
20/20 Awards	2017	Best Art Direction	Bo Welch	Nominated
Academy Awards	March 24, 1997	Best Art Direction	Bo Welch; Cheryl Carasik	Nominated
American Comedy Awards	1997	Funniest Lead Actor in a Motion Picture	Nathan Lane	Won
American Comedy Awards	1997	Funniest Supporting Actor in a Motion Picture	Hank Azaria	Nominated
American Comedy Awards	1997	Funniest Supporting Actress in a Motion Picture	Dianne Wiest	Won
American Comedy Awards	1997	Funniest Supporting Actress in a Motion Picture	Christine Baranski	Nominated
Art Directors Guild Awards	1997	Feature Film	Bo Welch; Tom Duffield; John Dexter	Nominated
Awards Circuit Community Awards	1997	Best Adapted Screenplay	Francis Veber; Edouard Molinaro; Marcello Danon; Jean Poiret; Elaine May	Nominated
Awards Circuit Community Awards	1997	Best Art Direction	Bo Welch; Cheryl Carasik	Nominated
Awards Circuit Community Awards	1997	Honorable Mentions	Mike Nichols	Nominated
Blockbuster Entertainment Awards	March 11, 1997	Favorite Supporting Actor – Comedy	Gene Hackman	Won
Blockbuster Entertainment Awards	March 11, 1997	Favorite Supporting Actress – Comedy	Dianne Wiest	Won
Casting Society of America Awards	October 15, 1996	Best Casting for Feature Film, Comedy	Juliet Taylor; Ellen Lewis	Nominated
Chicago Film Critics Association Awards	March 10, 1997	Best Supporting Actor	Nathan Lane	Nominated
Cinema Audio Society Awards	1997	Outstanding Achievement in Sound Mixing for Feature Films	Lee Dichter; Gene S. Cantamessa	Nominated
GLAAD Media Awards	1997	Outstanding Film – Wide Release	—N/a	Nominated
Golden Globe Awards	January 19, 1997	Best Motion Picture – Comedy or Musical	—N/a	Nominated
Golden Globe Awards	January 19, 1997	Best Actor in a Motion Picture – Comedy or Musical	Nathan Lane	Nominated
International Monitor Awards	1997	Theatrical Releases – Color Correction	David Bernstein	Won
MTV Movie + TV Awards	June 10, 1997	Best Comedic Performance	Robin Williams	Nominated
MTV Movie + TV Awards	June 10, 1997	Best On-Screen Duo	Robin Williams; Nathan Lane	Nominated
Online Film & Television Association Awards	1997	Best Motion Picture – Comedy/Musical	Mike Nichols	Nominated
Online Film & Television Association Awards	1997	Best Actor in a Comedy/Musical	Nathan Lane	Nominated
Online Film & Television Association Awards	1997	Best Supporting Actor in a Comedy/Musical	Hank Azaria	Nominated
Satellite Awards	January 15, 1997	Best Actor in a Motion Picture – Comedy or Musical	Nathan Lane	Nominated
Satellite Awards	January 15, 1997	Best Supporting Actor in a Motion Picture – Comedy or Musical	Gene Hackman	Nominated
Screen Actors Guild Awards	February 22, 1997	Outstanding Performance by a Male Actor in a Supporting Role	Nathan Lane	Nominated
Screen Actors Guild Awards	February 22, 1997	Outstanding Performance by a Male Actor in a Supporting Role	Hank Azaria	Nominated
Screen Actors Guild Awards	February 22, 1997	Outstanding Performance by a Cast in a Motion Picture	Hank Azaria; Christine Baranski; Dan Futterman; Gene Hackman; Nathan Lane; Robin Williams; Dianne Wiest	Won
Writers Guild of America Awards	March 16, 1997	Best Screenplay Based on Material Previously Produced or Published	Elaine May	Nominated

== See also ==
- Cross-dressing in film and television
- List of lesbian, gay, bisexual, or transgender-related films by storyline
