= La Cage aux Folles II =

- Theatrical release poster
- Directed by: Édouard Molinaro
- Written by: Marcello Danon; Jean Poiret; Francis Veber
- Story by: Jean Poiret; Dialogue: Francis Veber
- Based on: Characters by Jean Poiret
- Produced by: Marcello Danon
- Starring: Michel Serrault; Ugo Tognazzi; Marcel Bozzuffi
- Cinematography: Armando Nannuzzi
- Edited by: Monique Isnardon; Robert Isnardon
- Music by: Ennio Morricone
- Production companies: Da Ma Produzione; Les Productions Artistes Associés
- Distributed by: United Artists
- Release dates: 10 December 1980 (France); 15 February 1981 (United States)
- Running time: 99 minutes
- Countries: France; Italy
- Language: French
- Box office: $7 million

La Cage aux Folles II is a 1980 comedy film and the sequel to 1978's La Cage aux Folles. It is directed by Édouard Molinaro and stars Michel Serrault as Albin (stage name ZaZa), the female impersonator star of a gay nightclub revue, and Ugo Tognazzi as Renato, his partner of over 20 years.

== Plot ==
A spy plants a capsule of microfilm on Albin and from then on spies and government agents pursue him. Albin and Renato travel to Italy to hide at Renato's mother's farm. At each point along the way, we see the straight world's reaction to Albin.

== Cast ==
- Michel Serrault as Albin Mougeotte/ZaZa Napoli
- Ugo Tognazzi as Renato Baldi
- Marcel Bozzuffi as Broca, chief of the government agents
- Michel Galabru as Simon Charrier
- Paola Borboni as Mrs. Baldi, Renato's mother
- Benny Luke as Jacob, Renato and Albin's housekeeper
- Giovanni Vettorazzo as Milan
- Glauco Onorato as Luigi
- Roberto Bisacco as Ralph
- Gianrico Tondinelli as Walter
- Giorgio Cerioni as Gunther
- Nazzareno Natale as Demis
- Antonio Francioni as Michaux
- Stelio Candelli as Hans
- Mark Bodin as Caramel, Albin's would-be replacement
- Tom Felleghy as Andrew Manderstam

== Critical response ==
La Cage aux Folles II holds a 57% rating on Rotten Tomatoes based on seven reviews.

Vincent Canby of The New York Times wrote "The film is as harmless, reassuring, sentimental and unsurprising as any prime-time situation comedy that has gone on too long." Gene Siskel of the Chicago Tribune gave the film 3 stars out of 4 and wrote "The new story is even less compelling than the old one, but this time the lead characters are more meaningful. 'Cage II' is a more poignant film, portraying the straight world as pursuers of power while the homosexuals seek love and beauty." Variety reported that the film was "markedly inferior" to the original and "is basically a Michael Serrault drag variety show ... There's little else here of interest or competence. Tognazzi has less to do than before and just fades into the background." Sheila Benson of the Los Angeles Times wrote "Nothing has changed. The plot has only thinned since the real story, Renato and Zaza's relationship, has already been so exhaustively explored." She noted, though, that the film "comes alive at the moments when it deals with double and triple role reversals." Lloyd Grove of The Washington Post wrote that "the sequel delivers the same punch lines to the same jokes, though this time there's a dash of international intrigue to keep things moving." Gilbert Adair of The Monthly Film Bulletin wrote that "the juxtaposition of campy histrionics with the dreariest type of espionage comedy offers quickly diminishing returns. A pity no worthier vehicle could have been found to reprise Michel Serrault's brilliant performances, the precision of whose comic mimicry can be compared without exaggeration to that of a kabuki female impersonator." Pauline Kael of The New Yorker wrote: " La Cage aux Folles II has nothing to do with the art of movies, but it has a great deal to do with the craft and art of acting, and the pleasures of farce. Serrault gives a superb comic performance - his Albin is a wildly fanciful creation. There's a grandeur about Albin's inability to see himself as he is. And maybe it's only in this exaggerated form that a movie about the ridiculousness and the tenderness of married love can be widely accepted now."
