= Rattle of a Simple Man =

1964 British film by Muriel Box

- Film poster
- Directed by: Muriel Box
- Written by: Charles Dyer
- Produced by: William J. Gell
- Starring: Diane Cilento; Harry H. Corbett; Michael Medwin; Thora Hird
- Cinematography: Reginald H. Wyer
- Edited by: Frederick Wilson
- Music by: Stanley Black
- Production company: Sydney Box Productions
- Distributed by: Warner-Pathé Distributors (UK); Continental Distributing (US)
- Release dates: 7 September 1964 (London); 20 December 1964 (US)
- Running time: 96 minutes
- Country: United Kingdom
- Languages: English, Italian
- Budget: £141,500

Rattle of a Simple Man is a 1964 British comedy-drama film directed by Muriel Box and starring Diane Cilento, Harry H. Corbett and Michael Medwin. It was written by Charles Dyer, based on his 1962 play La Crécelle (Rattle of a Simple Man).

A naive Northern man on a trip to London becomes involved with a prostitute.

== Plot ==
Percy Winthram is a 39-year-old socially inept, anxious virgin who pretends to be younger. He travels by coach to London from Manchester with a group of friends to watch the FA Cup Final. The group have a night out in Soho and a £50 bet leads Percy to spend the evening with prostitute Cyrenne.

== Cast ==
- Diane Cilento as Cyrenne
- Harry H. Corbett as Percy Winthram
- Michael Medwin as Ginger
- Thora Hird as Mrs. Winthram
- Charles Dyer as Chalky
- Hugh Futcher as Ozzie
- Carole Gray as district nurse
- Barbara Archer as Iris
- David Saire as Mario
- Alexander Davion as Ricardo
- John Ronane as Willie
- Michael Robbins as George
- George Roderick as Papa
- Marie Burke as Mama
- Bryan Mosley as Mr. Stratton (uncredited)
- Marianne Stone as barmaid
- Brian Wilde as Fred
- Ingrid Anthofer as 1st stripper
- Karen Kaufman as 2nd stripper
- Terence Brook as strip club barman
- Eric Mason as strip club doorman
- Thelma Taylor as strip club waitress
- David Burke as Jack
- Paul Ferris as Mike
- Frank Hawkins as crying man
- Roy Patrick as sailor
- Doug Robinson as Big Joe
- Christine Taylor as party girl
- Marjie Lawrence as barmaid (uncredited)

== Production ==
Sydney Box emerged from a temporary retirement from filmmaking to buy the rights to the play for £50,000. Box originally wanted Peter Sellers for the lead role but he was too expensive.

== Reception ==
=== Box office ===
The film was not a success at the box office.

=== Critical ===
Variety commented that "most of the charm and tenderness that occasionally illuminated Charles Dyer’s successful play has been lost in this coarsened, fatuous film. Only a lively, vivid performance by Diane Cilento in a contrived role holds much interest, though a sound cast does spartan work in juggling the sparse material."

The Monthly Film Bulletin wrote: "Such merit as Charles Dyer's stage original possessed sprang from the fact that it was almost entirely a two-hander, a carefully modulated duologue between Percy and Cyrenne in which the humour almost counterbalanced the sentimentality. Here, everything has been conventionally opened out and coarsened. Harry Corbett grossly overplays the coy gaucherie; the Italian family (including sinister, black-shirted brother, lecherous stepfather and grieving mama) is pure melodrama; and the whole atmosphere of London sin is fetchingly ludicrous. Miraculously, though, by her astringent playing Diane Cilento almost achieves the impossible in creating a character out of nothing."

Leslie Halliwell said: "Archetypal farcical situation with sentiment added to string it out to twice its proper length. Production values modest but adequate."

The Radio Times Guide to Films gave the film 2/5 stars, writing: "Harry H Corbett strays into Norman Wisdom territory in this disappointing comedy from the husband-and-wife team of Sydney and Muriel Box. In adapting his play for the big screen, Charles Dyer so overdoes the pathos that what few laughs there are seem rather cruel and out of place. As the innocent following his football team to Wembley, Corbett is unconvincingly wide-eyed, although his scenes with prostitute Diane Cilento have a certain sweetness about them."

Sky Movies called it "a rather touching and at times richly amusing extended playlet about an 'innocent' football fan from the north, and the night he spends talking to a London prostitute in her flat. Not very plausible, perhaps, but winningly done. As Cyrenne, the streetwalker, Diane Cilento is persuasive and just right. And Harry H Corbett was able to break away completely from his Steptoe image. Michael Medwin is also very good as Corbett's big-talking friend."
