= La Cage aux Folles 3: The Wedding =

- Directed by: Georges Lautner
- Written by: Marcello Danon; Michel Audiard; Christine Carère; Gérard Lamballe; Georges Lautner; Philippe Nicaud
- Produced by: Marcello Danon
- Starring: Michel Serrault; Ugo Tognazzi; Antonella Interlenghi; Saverio Vallone; Benny Luke; Stéphane Audran; Michel Galabru
- Cinematography: Luciano Tovoli
- Edited by: Michelle David
- Music by: Ennio Morricone
- Production companies: Columbia Films S.A. Da Ma Produzione S.r.l.
- Distributed by: C.E.I.A.D. (Italy); Columbia Pictures; Tri-Star Pictures
- Release date: 20 November 1985
- Running time: 87 minutes
- Countries: France; Italy
- Language: French
- Box office: $345,280

La Cage aux Folles 3: The Wedding (French: La cage aux folles 3 – 'Elles' se marient) is a 1985 comedy film and the third and final installment in the La Cage aux Folles series. Unlike the first two films, which were directed by Édouard Molinaro, this third installment is directed by Georges Lautner.

== Plot ==
In order to inherit his Aunt Emma's large fortune (which includes a large chunk of Scotland), Albin must marry a woman and father a child. Renato goes along with the plan in an attempt to save their St. Tropez nightclub. Albin consults marriage broker Matrimonia and tries to act like a conservative heterosexual, but all attempts to conform fail and he considers suicide. When all hope seems to be lost, Renato and Albin meet a suicidal young woman, Cindy, who decides that marrying Albin may be better than death.

== Cast ==
- Michel Serrault as Albin Mougeotte / "ZaZa Napoli"
- Ugo Tognazzi as Renato Baldi
- Antonella Interlenghi as Cindy
- Saverio Vallone as Mortimer
- Michel Galabru as Simon Charrier
- Benny Luke as Jacob
- Stéphane Audran as Matrimonia
- Gianluca Favilla as Dulac
- Umberto Raho as Kennedy

== Release ==
A Region 2 DVD was released in Italy in 2009 under its Italian release title Matrimonio Con Vizietto.
