= La Cage aux Folles (film) =

1978 film by Édouard Molinaro

- French theatrical release poster
- Directed by: Édouard Molinaro
- Screenplay by: Francis Veber; Édouard Molinaro; Marcello Danon; Jean Poiret
- Based on: La Cage aux Folles by Jean Poiret
- Produced by: Marcello Danon
- Starring: Ugo Tognazzi; Michel Serrault; Claire Maurier; Rémi Laurent; Benny Luke; Carmen Scarpitta; Luisa Maneri; Michel Galabru
- Cinematography: Armando Nannuzzi
- Edited by: Robert Isnardon; Monique Isnardon
- Music by: Ennio Morricone
- Production companies: Les Productions Artistes Associés; Da.Ma. Produzione
- Distributed by: Les Artistes Associés
- Release dates: 20 October 1978 (Italy); 25 October 1978 (France)
- Running time: 91 minutes
- Countries: France; Italy
- Language: French
- Budget: $1.1 million
- Box office: $20.4 million

La Cage aux Folles ([la kaʒ o fɔl], lit. 'The Fairies' cage' or 'The Queens' cage', also released as Birds of a Feather) is a 1978 comedy film directed and co-written by Édouard Molinaro, based on Jean Poiret's 1973 play. It stars Ugo Tognazzi and Michel Serrault as a gay couple operating a drag nightclub on the French Riviera, Rémi Laurent as the former's son, and Michel Galabru and Carmen Scarpitta as the ultraconservative parents of the son’s fiancée. The French-language picture was a French-Italian co-production by United Artists.

The film was released in Italy on 20 October 1978 and in France on 25 October. A considerable commercial success in Europe, it also became one of the highest-grossing foreign-language films released in the United States. It won the Golden Globe Award for Best Foreign Language Film and was nominated for three Oscars: Best Director (Molinaro), Best Adapted Screenplay, and Best Costume Design. Michel Serrault won the César Award for Best Actor and the David di Donatello for Best Foreign Actor. The film was followed by two sequels. The 1983 musical was adapted from the same source material, while the 1996 American film The Birdcage was a remake of this film.

== Plot ==
In Saint-Tropez, Renato Baldi and Albin Mougeotte, a middle-aged gay couple, have been together for two decades despite Albin's frequent drama-queen antics, which Renato wearily endures. Renato is the owner of the drag nightclub downstairs from their apartment, La Cage aux Folles, where Albin is the main attraction under the drag persona Zaza Napoli. Renato has a 20 year-old son from a brief heterosexual fling, Laurent, whom he and Albin have raised together.

Renato is eventually taken aback when Laurent announces his engagement to a young woman, Andréa; while disappointed that his son is heterosexual, he accepts the situation. However, Andréa is the daughter of Simon Charrier, the secretary-general of the Union for Moral Order, an ultraconservative political party. Fearing the reaction of her strict parents, Andréa told them that Laurent's father is a cultural attaché at the Italian Embassy and his "mother" is a housewife.

After the chairman of the Union for Moral Order dies while having intercourse with an underage Black prostitute, Charrier worries about his own reputation as reporters begin to hound him. Although Charrier initially believes that Andréa is too young to marry, his wife Louise convinces him that their daughter's marriage to a diplomat's son is the perfect opportunity to restore his image and deflect attention from the ensuing scandal. Meanwhile, Laurent informs Renato that he has invited Andréa and her parents over for dinner to meet his family. To avoid shocking his future in-laws, Laurent asks his father to conceal his homosexuality and redecorate his flamboyant apartment; Renato reluctantly agrees.

To hide the nature of their relationship, Renato coaches Albin to try and tone down his own effeminate mannerisms, but their attempts end in utter failure. Renato then tries to convince Albin to stay out of the apartment during the Charriers' visit, but seeing how hurt Albin is, relents and agrees to let him stay. To make their charade more believable, Renato visits Laurent's biological mother, Simone—whom Laurent has not seen in nearly 20 years—and asks her to pretend to be his wife for the evening. Simone agrees, but Renato gives in to her advances, and their tryst is caught by Albin, who is heartbroken and moves out of the apartment. Renato finds Albin at a train station and convinces him to return home.

On the evening of the dinner party, Simone calls to tell Laurent that she is on her way, asking him if he still wants her to come, which he confirms. As the Charriers arrive for the dinner, Renato and Laurent engage in small talk with the Charriers, while Andréa plays along. However, Albin unexpectedly arrives in full drag and poses as Laurent's mother, to Renato and Laurent's embarrassment. The Charriers are initially fooled, but as the evening progresses, a series of blunders gradually undermines Renato and Albin's facade.

When Simone arrives, introducing herself as Laurent's mother, Renato and Albin confess the truth to the Charriers, just before the drag queens from La Cage aux Folles enter the apartment to congratulate Renato and Albin on their 20th anniversary. Outraged, the Charriers try to leave, only to find that reporters, having bribed their chauffeur for information, have blocked the back door, eager to take pictures of them leaving the nightclub. Albin dresses Charrier up in drag so that he and his wife can leave unnoticed, in exchange for their blessing for the marriage.

Some time later, Laurent and Andréa get married. At the ceremony, Albin squabbles with an exhausted Renato about Simone also being in attendance and sitting next to Andréa's parents.

== Cast ==
- Ugo Tognazzi as Renato Baldi
- Michel Serrault as Albin Mougeotte / Zaza Napoli
- Claire Maurier as Simone Deblon
- Rémi Laurent as Laurent Baldi
- Carmen Scarpitta as Louise Charrier
- Benny Luke as Jacob
- Luisa Maneri as Andréa Charrier
- Michel Galabru as Simon Charrier
- Venantino Venantini as the Charriers' chauffeur
- Carlo Reali as the bouncer
- Guido Cerniglia as the doctor
- Angelo Pellegrino as a nightclub assistant
- Vinicio Diamanti as Mercedes
- Liana Del Balzo as Madame Charrier, Simon's mother
- Piero Mazzinghi as a journalist

== Production ==
La Cage aux Folles was based on the 1973 French play by Jean Poiret. The story's settings were inspired by the Paris drag cabaret Chez Michou. The play, which originally starred Poiret and Michel Serrault, was a major commercial success in France, where it ran for more than 1,500 performances. The French film industry, however, proved reluctant to adapt it for the screen, and the adaptation rights were eventually bought by Italian producer Marcello Danon.

The Italian co-production led to the film being partially shot in Rome, and to Italian actor Ugo Tognazzi being cast in the role originated by Poiret. Tognazzi initially requested to play Albin, the character originated by Serrault, but Poiret insisted that Serrault keep his role. The play was adapted for the screen by Francis Veber, initially with Poiret's collaboration and later with input from director Édouard Molinaro and Danon. Interiors were shot at Dear Film and Cinecitta Studios in Rome. Exterior filming was on-location in Saint-Tropez and Nice.

To accommodate Tognazzi's casting, his character—a Frenchman named Georges in the play—was changed to an Italian named Renato. However, problems arose during production with the Italian actor, who was frustrated with his role and felt he was just being a foil to Serrault. While he had contractually committed to acting in French, the fear of not measuring up to Serrault's performance made him change his mind and he secured the right to deliver his lines in his native language. This caused problems while shooting because Serrault, who performed in French, did not have a command of Italian. Tognazzi made matters worse by changing his lines and improvising. Also, Tognazzi proved reluctant to accept Molinaro's instructions, and ended up having a very poor working relationship with him; he eventually considered leaving the shoot, but changed his mind after being informed of the cost of breaching his contract.

Tognazzi ultimately did not dub his own lines into French during post-production, which required the intervention of a French voice actor and caused additional problems due to the difference in the number of syllables between French and Italian. Following attempts by two other actors, Tognazzi's performance was eventually voiced into French by Pierre Mondy, who had directed the original play and also stepped in as Georges in some later stage performances.

== Reception ==
=== Box office ===
La Cage aux Folles was the second highest-grossing film of 1978 in France with 5,406,614 admissions. It was also a box-office hit in Italy, where it similarly ranked second for the 1978-79 season. In Germany, it received 2.65 million admissions, making it the 11th highest-grossing film of the year. As of 2025, it is the 13th highest-grossing foreign-language film released in the United States.

=== Critical response ===
On the review aggregator website Rotten Tomatoes, the film holds an approval rating of 92% based on 24 reviews, with an average rating of 7.7/10. The website's critics consensus reads, "La Cage aux Folles is a fine French-Italian farce with flamboyant, charming characters and deep laughs."

Despite the film's massive success at the French box office, critical reception in France was mixed upon release, with reviewers arguing that the adaptation made the play's broad humor even broader. However, Michel Serrault's performance was widely praised. Although Serrault was already well-known to the French public as a comedic actor, his career was boosted by this film, which earned him the César Award for Best Actor. While the success of La Cage aux folles led him to play other farcical gay characters, he also transitioned in subsequent years to major dramatic roles. In a 2025 review, Bernard Génin of Télérama called Serrault's performance "unforgettable", though he found the film's weak point to be the casting of an "unfunny" Tognazzi, who never rose to the level of the overall antics.

Critical response in the United States was equally mixed. Roger Ebert gave the film three-and-a-half stars out of four and wrote that "the comic turns in the plot are achieved with such clockwork timing that sometimes we're laughing at what's funny and sometimes we're just laughing at the movie's sheer comic invention. This is a great time at the movies." On the other hand, Vincent Canby of The New York Times gave the film a negative review, writing that it was "naughty in the way of comedies that pretend to be sophisticated but actually serve to reinforce the most popular conventions and most witless stereotypes." Gene Siskel of the Chicago Tribune gave the film two-and-a-half stars out of four and wrote, "For me, La Cage aux Folles was over soon after it began. It's all so predictable. This could have been a Luci & Desi comedy routine. The film's only distinctive quality is the skill of its veteran actors in working with tired material."

Kevin Thomas of the Los Angeles Times called the film "a frequently hilarious French variation on Norman, Is That You? and has the same broad humor and appeal but has been put over with considerably more aplomb." Gary Arnold of The Washington Post panned the film for "stale, excruciating sex jokes" and direction that "has evidently failed to devise a playing rhythm to compensate for whatever farcical tempo the material enjoyed on the stage."

David McGillivray of the Monthly Film Bulletin described the film as "a crude amalgam of Norman, Is That You? and John Bowen's play Trevor ... All shrieks, mincing and limp wrists, La Cage aux Folles also looks positively antiquated beside the sophisticated gay comedy of such as Craig Russell."

=== Accolades ===
Award	Category	Recipient(s)	Result
Academy Awards	Best Director	Édouard Molinaro	Nominated
Academy Awards	Best Writing, Screenplay Based on Material from Another Medium	Édouard Molinaro, Francis Veber, Marcello Danon, Jean Poiret	Nominated
Academy Awards	Best Costume Design	Piero Tosi, Ambra Danon	Nominated
César Awards	Best Actor	Michel Serrault	Won
David di Donatello	Best Foreign Actor	Michel Serrault	Won
Golden Globe Awards	Best Foreign Language Film	La Cage aux Folles	Won
National Board of Review	Best Foreign Language Film	La Cage aux Folles	Won
National Board of Review	Top Foreign Films	La Cage aux Folles	Won
New York Film Critics Circle Awards	Best Foreign Language Film	La Cage aux Folles	2nd place
Sant Jordi Awards	Best Performance in a Foreign Film	Michel Serrault	2nd place

== Legacy ==
The film was followed by two sequels, with Tognazzi, Serrault, Galabru, and Luke reprising their roles; La Cage aux Folles II (1980), also directed by Molinaro, and La Cage aux Folles 3: The Wedding (1985), directed by Georges Lautner. The original film has endured in France as a classic of mainstream entertainment thanks to numerous television broadcasts.

Similar to the original play five years prior, La Cage aux folles was released in a context where gay visibility was very limited in France. Also like the play, it was controversial upon release within the French gay community where some found the portrayals overly stereotypical or even insulting, while others embraced the humor and the campy characters. In retrospect, French journalist and LGBT film historian Didier Roth-Bettoni has noted that the film—which he did not consider to have much artistic merit—had a positive impact on the visibility and perception of gay people in France. He observed that, despite the comedic setting and farcical situations, the gay couple was depicted with respect and humanity (particularly Albin/Zaza, notwithstanding his flamboyance), whereas the conservative, bigoted characters were the ones subjected to far greater ridicule. Likewise, the film is credited with improving the perception of gay people in Italy, where depicting a gay couple as relatable and likable—if comical—protagonists was perceived at the time as a major innovation.

In 1979, on the heels of the film’s American release, television producer Danny Arnold pitched the concept of a weekly series about a gay couple similar to the one in the film to ABC. His planned title was Adam and Yves, a play on both Adam and Eve and a slogan used by some anti-gay groups. After months in development, Arnold realized that the concept was unsustainable as a weekly series, which led to the show getting dropped.

The film's success in the United States resulted in the creation of the 1983 Broadway musical La Cage aux Folles, with music and lyrics by Jerry Herman and a book by Harvey Fierstein, though it was based on the original play rather than tbe film.

In 1996 the film received an American remake titled The Birdcage, directed by Mike Nichols and written by Elaine May, which moved the plot to South Beach and starred Robin Williams and Nathan Lane in the roles played respectively by Tognazzi and Serrault.

== See also ==
- List of cult films
