= La Cage aux Folles (musical) =

1983 musical composed by Jerry Herman, with libretto by Harvey Fierstein

- Original Broadway windowcard
- Music: Jerry Herman
- Lyrics: Jerry Herman
- Book: Harvey Fierstein
- Basis: La Cage aux Folles by Jean Poiret
- Productions: 1983 Boston (tryout); 1983 Broadway; 1984 US Tour; 1984 US Tour; 1986 West End; 1987 US Tour; 1993 US Tour; 2004 Broadway; 2008 West End; 2010 Broadway; 2011 US Tour; 2017 UK Tour
- Awards: 1984 Tony Award for Best Musical; 1984 Tony Award for Best Book of a Musical; 1984 Tony Award for Best Original Score; 2005 Tony Award for Best Revival of a Musical; 2009 Laurence Olivier Award for Best Musical Revival; 2010 Tony Award for Best Revival of a Musical

La Cage aux Folles (French pronunciation: [la kaʒ o fɔl]) is a musical with music and lyrics by Jerry Herman and a book by Harvey Fierstein.

Based on the 1973 French play of the same name, the show tells the story of a gay couple, Georges, the manager of a Saint-Tropez nightclub featuring drag entertainment, and Albin, his romantic partner and star attraction; farcical adventures ensue when household dynamics intersect with an ultra-conservative politician.

Opening on Broadway in 1983, La Cage broke barriers for gay representation by becoming the first hit Broadway musical centered on a homosexual relationship. The show's act one finale "I Am What I Am" received praise as a "gay anthem" and has been widely recorded.

The original production ran for more than four years (1,761 performances), and won six Tony Awards, including Best Musical, Best Score, and Best Book.

The success of the musical spawned a West End (London) production and several international runs. Subsequent revivals have garnered considerable success, winning the Tony Award for Best Revival of a Musical in both 2005 and 2010, as well as the Olivier Award for Best Musical Revival in 2009.

== Background ==
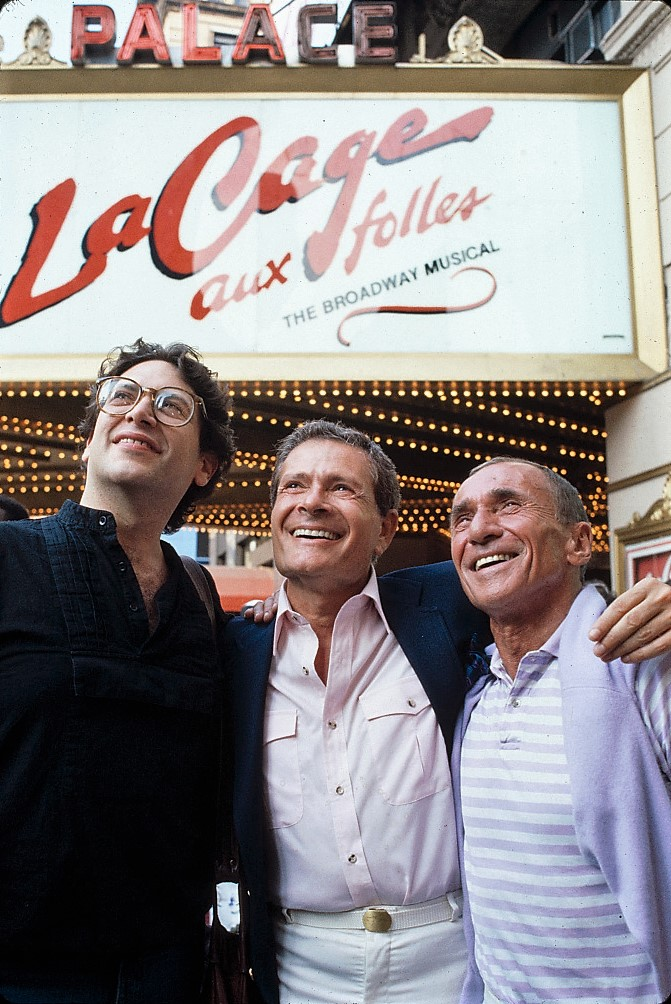
Harvey Fierstein, Jerry Herman, Arthur Laurents, creators of the musical La Cage aux Folles, in front of the Palace Theatre, 1983

Allan Carr, who had produced the successful film adaptation of Grease (1978), was eager to work in theatre and thought a musical version of the hit 1978 film La Cage aux Folles would be an ideal vehicle for his Broadway debut. However, he was unable to secure the rights to the film and was forced to settle for the rights to the original play only. Carr hired Jay Presson Allen to write the book and Maury Yeston to compose the score for The Queen of Basin Street, an Americanized version set in New Orleans. With Mike Nichols set to direct and Tommy Tune on board as choreographer, Carr searched for executive producers and found them in Fritz Holt and Barry Brown, who immediately fired the entire creative team that Carr had assembled. All of them eventually filed lawsuits, but Yeston alone won and later collected a small royalty from La Cage.

Holt and Brown had produced the 1974 revival of Gypsy directed by Arthur Laurents, and they approached him with an offer to direct their new venture. Laurents was not a fan of drag or camp entertainment and thought Holt and Brown never would find enough investors to finance a gay-themed project at a time when, during the early years of the AIDS epidemic, homophobia was more intense than ever. He agreed only because Holt and Brown were close friends and he wanted them to remain on Carr's payroll as long as possible, but his interest grew when he learned Harvey Fierstein and Jerry Herman had committed to the project.

According to Laurents, when he met with Fierstein and Herman for the first time, they had restored both the title and locale of the original play but had neither a script nor even an outline for the plot. All they had was the Herman song "I Am What I Am", and Laurents immediately envisioned it as an emotional outburst sung at the close of the first act. Laurents further claims that when he explained his concept to Fierstein and Herman, he inspired the direction they took in writing the musical. Herman tells a very different story in an interview included in the original cast CD. He claims that they were well into the collaboration when Fierstein arrived one day with an emotional fiery scene he had written for the end of Act I that included the words "I am what I am". Delighted, Herman asked to use the five words, boasting he would have a song by morning, which he did. With gay-activist Fierstein and the political Laurents on board, the show could have "become a polemic diatribe on gay rights." However, Herman was a moderating influence. Having suffered a series of disappointments with darker-themed shows since 1969, he was eager to score a hit with a mainstream, emotional, optimistic song-and-dance entertainment that middle-class audiences would enjoy. The team opted to create "a charming, colorful, great-looking musical comedy - an old-fashioned piece of entertainment," as Herman recalled in his memoir Showtune. By "delivering their sentiments in a sweetly entertaining manner", the team was able to convey their gay-themed message with more impact than they could have with a more aggressive approach.

Fierstein, Herman and Laurents met daily in Herman's Manhattan townhouse to work on the musical. Because they were limited to using only the Poiret play as a source, they were unable to include the character of Jean-Michel's birth mother, who had been created for the film. They focused the plot on the fact that the relationship of Georges and Albin seems so natural that the boy is able to accept a man as his "mother". The three men agreed that Albin needed to be as glamorous an entertainer as possible, and Theoni V. Aldredge was hired as costume designer to achieve their goal.

The producers agreed to a Boston tryout, and just before the second preview (the first was cancelled due to problems with the mechanized set), Herman had a panic attack prompted by his fear that the city probably was too conservative to embrace a gay-themed musical, albeit one designed for a mainstream audience. The Boston crowds gave the show an enthusiastic reception. Fierstein, Herman and Laurents were also concerned that this was essentially a love story in which the lovers barely touched each other. Fierstein suggested they kiss on the cheeks at the end, and Laurents, citing the common custom of French men kissing each other on both cheeks, agreed.

George Hearn as Albin had the showier role and many of the big musical numbers. His character was fully drawn, and behind the drag performer, the audience could see "a person driven to take a stand for himself – a notion that all people could relate to." In contrast, during rehearsals, everyone had supported firing Gene Barry, who was considered adequate but never outstanding as Georges, but finding a replacement proved to be difficult. Finally, just before opening night, Laurents directed him always to look into Hearn's eyes, whenever the two men were on stage, so the audience would sense the depth of the couple's feelings for each other. The director also had Georges introduce the various club acts with more of a flourish, "like an aria that will land like a musical number." Both of these last-minute stage directions enabled Barry to get a better grasp of his character. Barry went on to get a Tony nomination for Best Actor in a musical for his efforts, while co-star Hearn took home the trophy.

According to theatre historian John Kenrick, La Cage aux Folles helped make the 1983 Broadway season an especially strong one. He noted that following La Cage and Big River in 1985, for "the first time since Oklahoma, a full decade would go by before a new American musical would pass the 1,000-performance mark."

== Synopsis ==
=== Act I ===
Georges, the master of ceremonies, welcomes the audience to his St. Tropez drag nightclub, "La Cage aux Folles". The chorus line known as Les Cagelles appear and introduce themselves to the audience ("We Are What We Are"). Georges and his spouse, Albin, have lived happily together for many years in an apartment above La Cage with their "maid" Jacob. Albin is a drag queen and the star performer of La Cage aux Folles under the alias of "Zaza".

As Albin prepares to perform ("[A Little More] Mascara"), Georges' 24-year-old son Jean-Michel (the offspring of a confused, youthful liaison with a woman named Sybil) arrives home with the news that he is engaged to Anne Dindon. Georges is reluctant to approve of Jean-Michel's engagement, but Jean-Michel assures his father that he is in love with Anne ("With Anne on My Arm"). Unfortunately, her father is head of the "Tradition, Family and Morality Party", whose stated goal is to close the local drag clubs. Anne's parents want to meet their daughter's future in-laws. Jean-Michel has lied to his fiancée, describing Georges as a retired diplomat. Jean-Michel pleads with Georges to tell Albin to absent himself (and his flamboyant behaviors) for the visit - and for Georges to redecorate the apartment in a more subdued fashion. Jean-Michel also asks Georges to invite Sybil, who has barely seen him since his birth, to dinner in Albin's stead. Albin returns from the show to greet his son when Georges suggests that they take a walk ("With You on My Arm").

Georges takes Albin to the Promenade Café, owned by Monsieur and Madame Renaud, where he attempts to soften Albin's emotions before telling him of Jean-Michel's request ("Song on the Sand"). Before Georges can break the news to him, Albin suggests that they hurry back to La Cage to make it in time for the next show. They arrive in time and Albin takes the stage once more as Zaza ("La Cage aux Folles"). While Albin is performing, Georges and Jean-Michel quickly redecorate the house. While Albin is changing for his next number, he notices the two carrying his gowns and demands to know what is going on. Georges finally tells Albin of Jean-Michel's plan and expects Albin to explode with fury, but he remains silent. Albin then re-joins Les Cagelles onstage, tells them to leave, and begins to sing alone in defiance of Jean-Michel, stating that he is proud of who he is and refuses to change for anyone ("I Am What I Am"). He throws his wig at Georges and departs in a huff.

=== Act II ===
The next morning, Georges finds Albin at the Promenade Café after his abrupt departure and apologizes ("Song on the Sand [Reprise]"). He then suggests to Albin that he dress up for dinner as macho "Uncle Al". Albin is still upset, but reluctantly agrees to act like a heterosexual for Jean-Michel. With the help of Monsieur and Madame Renaud, Georges successfully teaches Albin to abandon his flamboyancy ("Masculinity"). Back at the chastely redesigned apartment, Georges shows "Uncle Al" to Jean-Michel. Jean-Michel doesn't like the idea and expresses his dislike for Albin's lifestyle. Georges angrily reminds Jean-Michel of how good of a "mother" Albin has been to him ("Look Over There"). They then receive a telegram that Jean-Michel's mother Sybil is not coming and Anne's parents arrive ("Dishes [Cocktail Counterpoint]"). Hoping to save the day, Albin appears as Jean-Michel's buxom, forty-year-old mother, in pearls and sensible shoes. The nervous Jacob burns the dinner, so a trip to a local restaurant, "Chez Jacqueline", belonging to an old friend of Albin and Georges, is quickly arranged. No one has told Jacqueline of the situation, and she asks Albin (as Zaza) for a song, to which he hesitantly agrees ("The Best of Times"). Everyone in the restaurant begins to take part in the song, causing Albin to yield to the frenzy of performance and tear off his wig at the song's climax, revealing his true identity.

Back at the apartment, the Dindons plead with their daughter to abandon her fiancé, for they are appalled by his homosexual parents, but she is in love with Jean-Michel and refuses to leave him. Jean-Michel, deeply ashamed of the way he has treated Albin, asks his forgiveness ("Look Over There [Reprise]"), which is lovingly granted. The Dindons prepare to depart, but their way is blocked by Jacqueline, who has arrived with the press, ready to photograph the notorious anti-homosexual activists with Zaza. Georges and Albin have a proposal: If Anne and Jean-Michel may marry, Georges will help the Dindons escape through La Cage downstairs. Georges bids the audience farewell while Les Cagelles prepare the Dindons for the grand finale ("La Cage aux Folles [Reprise]"). Georges then introduces the Dindons, dressed in drag as members of the nightclub's revue, and they escape the paparazzi with Jean-Michel and Anne behind them. With everyone gone, Albin enters and he and Georges briefly sing of their love for each other before sharing a kiss ("Finale [With You On My Arm/La Cage aux Folles/Song on the Sand/The Best Of Times]").

== Characters ==
- Albin: Baritone – the aging star of La Cage aux Folles who performs as the drag queen Zaza and Georges' husband.
- Georges: Bass – The owner and master of ceremonies of La Cage and Albin's husband of over 20 years.
- Jean-Michel: Tenor – Georges' 24-year-old son from a brief heterosexual fling in Paris, raised by Albin and Georges as "mother" and father.
- Jacob: Tenor – Albin and Georges' butler, although he prefers to be called the maid, who dreams of performing in their show. He is close to Albin and often at odds with Georges.
- Jacqueline: Alto – Albin and Georges' stylish, imposing friend and the owner of Chez Jacqueline, a well-known elegant restaurant.
- Anne Dindon: Mezzo-Soprano – Jean-Michel's fiancée.
- Edouard Dindon: Bass – Anne's ultra-conservative father and the deputy general of the Tradition, Family, and Morality Party.
- Marie Dindon: Soprano – Anne's mother and Edouard's wife.
- Francis – the stage manager of La Cage.
- M. Renaud – Albin and Georges' friend and the owner of the Promenade Café.
- Saint-Tropez Townspeople – Babette, Colette, Etienne, Hercule, Paulette, Mme. Renaud, and Tabarro.
- Les Cagelles, 12 ensemble drag performers who work at La Cage (six in the 2010 Broadway Revival) – Angelique, Bitelle, Chantal, Clo-Clo, Dermah, Hanna, Lo Singh, Mercedes, Monique, Nicole, Odette, and Phaedra.

== Principal casts ==
| Character | Broadway | First US National Tour | Second US National Tour | West End | Third US National Tour | First Broadway Revival | First West End Revival | Second Broadway Revival | Fourth US National Tour | UK Tour | Sydney | Regent's Park Open Air Theatre |
| Character | 1983 | 1984-85 | 1984-86 | 1986 | 1987-88 | 2004 | 2008 | 2010 | 2011 | 2017 | 2023 | |
|---|---|---|---|---|---|---|---|---|---|---|---|---|
| Albin | George Hearn | Walter Charles | Keene Curtis | George Hearn | Harvey Evans | Gary Beach | Douglas Hodge | Douglas Hodge | Christopher Sieber | John Partridge | Paul Capsis | Carl Mullaney |
| Georges | Gene Barry | Keith Michell | Peter Marshall | Denis Quilley | Larry Kert | Daniel Davis | Denis Lawson | Kelsey Grammer | George Hamilton | Adrian Zmed | Michael Cormick | Billy Carter |
| Jean-Michel | John Weiner | Joseph Breen | Peter Reardon | Jonathon Morris | Dan O'Grady | Gavin Creel | Stuart Neal | A.J. Shively | Billy Harrigan Tighe | Dougie Carter | Noah Mullins | Ben Culleton |
| Jacob | William Thomas, Jr. | Darrell Carey | Ronald Dennis | Donald Waugh | Kent Gash | Michael Benjamin Washington | Jason Pennycooke | Robin de Jesús | Jeigh Madjus | Samson Ajewole | Anthony Brandon Wong | Shakeel Kimotho |
| Jacqueline | Elizabeth Parrish | Carol Teitel | Le Clanché du Rand | Phyllida Law | Sheila Smith | Ruth Williamson | Tracie Bennett | Christine Andreas | Gay Marshall | Marti Webb | Lucia Mastrantone | Debbie Kurup |
| Anne | Leslie Stevens | Mollie Smith | Juliette Kurth | Wendy Roe | Wendy Oliver | Angela Gaylor | Alicia Davies | Elena Shaddow | Allison Blair McDowell | Alexandra Robinson | Chloe Malek | Sophie Pourret |
| Edouard Dindon | Jay Garner | Robert Burr | Bob Carroll | Brian Glover | Bob Carroll | Michael Mulheren | Iain Mitchell | Fred Applegate | Bernard Burak Sheredy | Paul F. Monaghan | Lani Tapu | John Owen-Jones |
| Mme. Dindon | Merle Louise | Laurel Lockhart | Pamela Hamill | Julia Sutton | Patricia Arnell | Linda Balgord | Paula Wilcox | Veanne Cox | Cathy Newman | Su Douglas | Zoe Ventoura | Julie Jupp |

Notable replacements
Broadway (1983–87)

- Albin: Walter Charles, Lee Roy Reams
- Georges: Van Johnson, Peter Marshall, Keith Michell, Jamie Ross

Broadway Revival (2004–05)

- Georges: Robert Goulet

London Revival (2008–10)

- Albin: Graham Norton, Roger Allam, John Barrowman
- Georges: Steven Pacey, Philip Quast, Simon Burke

Broadway Revival (2010–11)

- Albin: Harvey Fierstein
- Georges: Jeffrey Tambor, Christopher Sieber
- Jacob: Wilson Jermaine Heredia
- M. Edouard Dindon: Michael McShane
- Mme. Dindon: Allyce Beasley

== Productions ==
=== Original Broadway production ===
La Cage aux Folles opened on Broadway at the Palace Theatre on August 21, 1983. It was directed by Arthur Laurents and choreographed by Scott Salmon, with set design by David Mitchell, costume design by Theoni V. Aldredge, and lighting design by Jules Fisher. The original Broadway cast included Gene Barry as Georges and George Hearn as Albin, with John Weiner as Jean-Michel, Jay Garner as Edouard Dindon, Merle Louise as Mme. Dindon, Elizabeth Parrish as Jacqueline, Leslie Stevens as Anne, and William Thomas Jr. as Jacob. Among the replacement performers who appeared in La Cage aux Folles during its original Broadway run were Walter Charles, Keene Curtis, Van Johnson, Peter Marshall, Keith Michell, Jamie Ross and Lee Roy Reams. The original production received nine Tony Award nominations, winning a total of six including Best Musical, Best Original Score and Best Book of a Musical. The show beat several strong competitors in many categories, including Stephen Sondheim's Sunday in the Park with George. It also won three Drama Desk Awards. The production ran for four years and 1,761 performances, closing on November 15, 1987.

=== Original West End production ===
The show had its West End premiere at the London Palladium on May 7, 1986, with the same creative team as the Broadway production. Hearn transferred with the production, which was made possible through an agreement with the American and British actors' unions, allowing him to come over in exchange for Robert Lindsay appearing in Me and My Girl on Broadway. The production also starred Denis Quilley as Georges, Jonathon Morris as Jean-Michel, Brian Glover as Edouard Dindon, Julia Sutton as Mme. Dindon, Phyllida Law as Jacqueline, Wendy Roe as Anne and Donald Waugh as Jacob. The show closed in London after 301 performances. Its short run and financial failure were partly blamed on the AIDS crisis, and producers were uncomfortable about portraying gay lives onstage quite so openly in mainstream musicals for some time afterwards.

=== 2004 Broadway revival ===
The first Broadway revival opened at the Marquis Theatre, beginning previews on November 11, 2004, with an official opening on December 9, 2004. The production team included Jerry Zaks as director, Jerry Mitchell as choreographer, Scott Pask, Donald Holder and William Ivey Long as designers. The cast included Gary Beach as Albin, Daniel Davis as Georges, Gavin Creel as Jean-Michel, Michael Mulheren as Edouard Dindon, Linda Balgord as Mme. Dindon, Ruth Williamson as Jacqueline, Angela Gaylor as Anne, and Michael Benjamin Washington as Jacob.

John Hillner took over for Davis as Georges in March on 2005 until Robert Goulet replaced Davis as Georges on April 15, 2005, and played the role until the production closed. Reviews for the production were mixed, with The New York Times stating that it "often gives the impression of merely going through the motions, amiably but robotically, of its gag-laden, sentimental plot", yet praised Les Cagelles, who "bring acrobatic oomph and angularity to centerpieces that include an aviary of exotic, back-flipping birds and a vigorous Montmartre-style can-can. As long as the Cagelles are doing their thing, your attention stays thoroughly engaged". The revival won a number of Tony and Drama Desk awards. The production closed on June 26, 2005. Ticket sales for the show had not increased after winning the Tony Award, and the show had been consistently selling at less than 60% capacity in the months before closing.

=== 2008 Menier Chocolate Factory and West End revival ===
A scaled-down London revival, starring Philip Quast and Douglas Hodge opened at the Menier Chocolate Factory on January 8, 2008, and played there until March 8, 2008. The cast also included Neil McDermott, Iain Mitchell and Una Stubbs, with direction by Terry Johnson and choreography by Lynne Page. The production had originally been scheduled to open in December 2007, but it was delayed twice due to illness within the cast. The show opened to mostly positive press with particular praise for Hodge's performance as Albin.

The Menier Chocolate Factory production transferred to the West End on October 20, 2008, at the Playhouse Theatre co-produced with Sonia Friedman Productions, Robert G. Bartner, David Ian Productions, The Ambassador Theatre Group, Matthew Mitchell and Jamie Hendry Productions. It was initially advertised as a "Strictly Limited 12 Week Season", although this became open-ended due to its success. Hodge reprised his role as Albin, joined by Denis Lawson as Georges. The cast also included Iain Mitchell as Edouard Dindon/M. Renaud, Paula Wilcox as Mme. Ranaud/Mme. Dindon and Tracie Bennett as Jacqueline. The production gathered rave reviews, with high praise again for Hodge and Les Cagelles. Whatsonstage.com commented: "A great Broadway show has been reborn as a classic musical comedy with real punch and pizzazz." Michael Billington of The Guardian reported that the show had improved with its transfer to the West End from the Menier Chocolate Factory. The production won the Laurence Olivier Award for Best Musical Revival, and Hodge won for Best Actor, out of a total of seven nominations. The roles of Albin and Georges have been re-cast in London every three months with well-known actors to keep the production fresh and public interest high. Television personality Graham Norton took over the role of Albin on January 19, 2009, alongside Steven Pacey as Georges. They were succeeded on May 4, 2009, by theatre veterans Roger Allam as Albin and Philip Quast reprising his role of Georges from the Menier Chocolate Factory. From September 12, 2009, until November 28, 2009, John Barrowman and Simon Burke played the roles of Albin and Georges respectively. Douglas Hodge as Albin and Denis Lawson as Georges returned to the production from 30 November 2009, until the production closed on January 2, 2010.

=== 2010 Broadway revival ===
A transfer of the 2008 London revival to Broadway began previews at the Longacre Theatre on April 6, 2010, and officially opened on April 18, 2010. Johnson and Page directed and choreographed. Douglas Hodge reprised the role of Albin and Kelsey Grammer starred as Georges. The set design was by Tim Shortall, costumes by Matthew Wright, lighting by Nick Richings, and scaled down eight-player orchestrations by Jason Carr. The production received positive reviews, many praising the scaled-down nature of the production and the performances of newcomers Douglas Hodge and Kelsey Grammer as Albin and Georges. The cast also featured A.J. Shively in his Broadway debut as Jean-Michel, Robin de Jesús as Jacob, Fred Applegate as Edouard Dindon/M. Renaud, Veanne Cox as Mme. Dindon/Mme. Renaud, Christine Andreas as Jacqueline and Elena Shaddow as Anne. The Cagelles included Nick Adams, Logan Keslar, Sean Patrick Doyle, Nicholas Cunningham, Terry Lavell and Yurel Echezarreta. The production received 11 Tony Award nominations and won Best Musical Revival, Best Actor in a Musical (Douglas Hodge) and Best Direction of a Musical. A cast recording of the revival was made by PS Classics and was released on September 28, 2010. The production closed on May 1, 2011, after 433 performances and 15 previews.

Notable replacements

- Allyce Beasley replaced Veanne Cox as Mme. Dindon/Mme. Renaud on September 14, 2010.
- Jeffrey Tambor replaced Kelsey Grammer as Georges on February 15, 2011, but withdrew from the production following the February 24, 2011, performance. Chris Hoch, who normally played Francis, and also served as an understudy for the leads assumed the role of Georges until a permanent replacement was found.
- Harvey Fierstein replaced Douglas Hodge as Albin/Zaza on February 15, 2011.
- Wilson Jermaine Heredia replaced Robin de Jesús as Jacob on February 15, 2011.
- Michael McShane replaced Fred Applegate as Edouard Dindon/M. Renaud on February 15, 2011.
- Christopher Sieber replaced Jeffrey Tambor as Georges on March 11, 2011.
- Veanne Cox returned to the role of Mme. Dindon/Mme. Renaud on April 5, 2011.
- Heather Lindell replaced Elena Shaddow in the role of Anne on April 5, 2011.

=== 2011 US tour ===
A national tour modeled after the 2010 Broadway revival began in September 2011 starting in Des Moines, Iowa. At first, Fierstein was asked to play the role of Georges and Sieber was asked to play the role of Albin, each taking the role the other had played on Broadway. Due to a full schedule, being set to write the book of the Disney musical Newsies and the musical Kinky Boots, Fierstein had to decline this offer. This tour starred George Hamilton in the role of Georges and Sieber as Albin. This was Sieber's national tour debut.

=== 2017 UK tour ===
A UK tour produced by Bill Kenwright began on 5 January 2017 at the New Theatre, Oxford. The cast included John Partridge as Albin, Adrian Zmed as Georges and Marti Webb as Jacqueline. Martin Connor directed the production, with choreography by Bill Deamer, design by Gary McCann and musical direction by Mark Crossland. This production was the first to tour the UK.

=== 2023 Regent's Park Open Air Theatre production ===
A production starring Carl Mullaney as Albin, Billy Carter as Georges, and John Owen-Jones as Edouard Dindon opened at London's Regent's Park Open Air Theatre on 29 July 2023, directed by the venue's artistic director Timothy Sheader, and ran until 23 September 2023.

=== 2026 Off-Broadway revival ===
Billy Porter and Wayne Brady star as Albin and Georges in an all-Black staging of La Cage Aux Folles at New York City Center as a part of its Encores! series. Robert O'Hara serves as director for the production, which runs June 17 to 28, 2026.

=== International productions ===
- 1985 Swedish production: The 1985 Swedish production opened at Malmö City Theatre on September 13, 1985, starring Jan Malmsjö (as Albin) and Carl-Åke Eriksson (as Georges). It played for 152 performances.
- 1985 Australian production: The 1985 Australian production starred Keith Michell (as Georges) and Jon Ewing (as Albin).
- 1985 German production: The German production opened at the Theater des Westens in Berlin on October 23, 1985, starring Helmut Baumann as Albin/Zaza, Günther König as Georges and Steve Barton as Jean-Michel. It played for 301 performances. In 1986, Steve Barton, who opened the show as Jean-Michel, took over the role of Albin/Zaza.
- 1991 Colombian production: The Colombian production debut was in June 1991 at the Jorge Eliécer Gaitán Theatre, Bogotá. Salsa singer César Mora (Albin/Zazá) and the Spanish-Colombian actor and showman Fernando González Pacheco as Georges (renamed Renato, as in the film version) in this Spanish version by César Escola and María Cecilia Botero. There is a recording of this stage production. Soap operas' famous villain Catherine Siachoque was a Cagelle on this Colombian production.
- 1993 Mexican production: The Mexico City production ran for two and a half years at the Teatro Silvia Pinal and starred Javier Díaz Dueñas as Albin/Zaza and Gustavo Rojo as Georges.
- 1999 Estonian production: The Estonian production was staged in Tallinn City Concert Hall (Tallinna Linnahall) by Smithbridge Productions and starred Tõnu Oja as Albin and Tõnu Kilgas as Georges. This was the first production in the former Soviet Union area.
- 1999 French production: directed and translated by Alain Marcel, starring Bernard Alane as Georges (renamed Renato) and Patrick Rocca as Albin. It premiered at the Théâtre Mogador in Paris.
- 2001 Spanish production: The Spanish production premiered at the Teatro Nuevo Apolo in Madrid and starred Andrés Pajares as Albin, Joaquín Kremel as Georges and Jacobo Dicenta as Jean-Michel.
- 2009 Portuguese production: The show opened in Portugal at the Rivoli Theatre in Porto in April 2009. It was translated, directed by Filipe La Féria with Carlos Quintas as Georges and José Raposo as Albin. This production is notable for changing its location from St. Tropez to Cascais and including other Jerry Herman songs like "Tap Your Troubles Away" (from Mack & Mabel) and "It's Today" (from Mame).
- 2010 Dutch production: A Dutch production premiered in November 2010 and ran through to June 2011 in the DeLaMar theater, Amsterdam.
- 2010 Thai production: A Thai adaptation of La Cage aux Folles (กินรีสีรุ้ง in Thai) opened in Bangkok on 16 June 2010 and closed on 3 July 2010 at Muangthai Rachadalai Theatre. The production was directed by Takonkiet (Tak) Viravan. This version was adapted to better suit target audience with the story set in Thailand and some characters names changed.
- 2012 Korean production: The Korean production ran in Seoul in 2012 for two months. Korean production won 4 awards in Korean Musical Awards.
- 2013 Danish production: A new Danish production opened in the spring 2013 at the Aarhus Theatre starring Niels Ellegaard (Georges) and Anders Baggesen (Albin).
- 2013 Panama production: The show opened in Panama City in June 2013 at the Teatro en Círculo. It stars Edwin Cedeño (Albin/Zaza) and Aaron Zebede (Georges).
- 2013 Puerto Rican production: The Puerto Rican production premiered on August 16, 2013, at the Luis A. Ferré Performing Arts Center in San Juan, Puerto Rico, starring Rafael José as Albin and Braulio Castillo Jr. as Georges, with Ulises Santiago de Orduna as Jean-Michel. Junior Álvarez as Edouard Dindon/M. Renaud, Sara Jarque as Mme. Dindon/Mme. Renaud, Deddie Romero as Jacqueline, Andrea Méndez as Anne, and Bryan Villarini as Jacob
- 2013 Swedish production: The Swedish production premiered on September 7, 2013, at The Göteborg Opera in Gothenburg, Sweden, starring Mikael Samuelson as Albin/Zaza and Hans Josefsson as Georges.
- 2014 Hungarian production: The Hungarian production ("Az Őrült Nők Ketrece" in Hungarian language) premiered on July 12, 2014, at Átrium theatre in Budapest, produced by Kultúrbrigád, is still running (from 2024 in RaM-ArT Theatre). This production directed by Róbert Alföldi, choreographed by Krisztián Gergye, starring András Stohl as Albin/Zaza, Gábor Hevér as Georges, with László Józan and Tibor Fehér as Jacob. Jean-Michel was played by Balázs Fehér between 2014 and 2020 (and several times as temporary replacement in 2022), Máté Kovács took over the role in 2021. The production is over the 450th performance, the show has been in repertory for eleven years (as of 2025).
- 2014 Korean Revival: The Korean Revival ran in LG Arts Center, Seoul in 2014 for three months
- 2014 Australian Revival: The Production Company produced the first major Australian revival of the musical, under the direction of Dean Bryant. The show was staged at the Playhouse Theatre in Melbourne, where it ran from November 21 to December 7. The cast featured Simon Burke as Georges, Todd McKenney as Albin, Robert Tripolino as Jean-Michel, Emily Milledge as Anne, Gary Sweet as Edouard Dindon, Marg Downey as Mme. Dindon, Rhonda Burchmore as Jacqueline, and Aljin Abella as Jacob.
- 2015 Philippine production: The Philippines production premiered on February 28, 2015, at the Carlos P Romulo Auditorium in RCBC Plaza, starring Audie Gemora as Albin and Michael De Mesa as Georges, with Steven Silva as Jean-Michel, produced by 9 Works Theatrical, with direction by Robbie Guevara and scenography by Mio Infante.
- 2015 Swedish production: The Swedish production premiered November 14, 2015, at the Uppsala City Theatre, and ran until March 3, 2016.
- 2015 Mexican revival: The Mexican Revival premiered on November 23, 2015, at the Teatro Hidalgo, starring Roberto Blandón as George, Mario Iván Martínez as Albin, Rogelio Suarez as Silviah (who also covered Zazá for some shows), and Israel Estrada as Jean-Michel, directed by Matias Gorlero and produced by Juan Torres.
- 2017 German production: La Cage aux Folles ran in the Staatstheater Mainz in Mainz, Germany, from October 2017 to June 2018. Opera singers Alin Deleanu and Stephan Bootz played Zaza/Albin and Georges respectively.
- 2018 Spanish production: A Spanish production ran at the Teatre Tívoli in Barcelona from September 27, 2018, to February 24, 2019, with Àngel Llàcer as Albin and Ivan Labanda as Georges. Later the show was transferred to Madrid and toured Spain before returning to Barcelona, where it closed on April 23, 2023.
- 2019 Hong Kong production: La Cage aux Folles (假鳳虛鸞 in Cantonese) premiered January 19, 2019, at Hong Kong Cultural Centre Grand Theatre by Hong Kong Repertory Theatre
- 2019 Tel Aviv production: The Israeli premiere opened in August 2019 for a limited charity run, with all the proceeds being donated to "Yesh Im Mi Ledaber" for preventing suicide among LGBT youth. The original Israeli cast included Roi Dolev as Albin and Oren Habot as George.
- 2024 Canadian production: A Stratford Festival production starring Steve Ross as Albin and Sean Arbuckle as Georges ran at the Avon Theatre in Stratford, Ontario from June to November, 2024. It was directed by Thom Allison with choreography by Cameron Carver.
- 2024 Los Angeles production: Sam Pinkleton directed Cheyenne Jackson and Kevin Cahoon in a production of the show staged at Pasadena Playhouse in November 2024.
- 2025 French production: directed by Olivier Py who also wrote a new translation of the lyrics, starring Laurent Lafitte as Albin and Damien Bigourdan as Georges. The show premiered in December 2025 at the Théâtre du Châtelet and was reprised in October 2026 at La Seine Musicale.

== Musical numbers ==
Act I

- Prelude – Orchestra
- "We Are What We Are" – Georges and Les Cagelles
- "(A Little More) Mascara" – Albin and Les Cagelles
- "With Anne on My Arm" – Jean-Michel and Georges
- "With You on My Arm" – Georges and Albin
- "Song on the Sand" – Georges
- "La Cage aux Folles" – Albin, Jacqueline and Les Cagelles
- "I Am What I Am" – Albin

Act II

- Entr'acte – Orchestra
- "Song on the Sand" (Reprise) – Georges and Albin
- "Masculinity" – Georges, Albin, M. Renaud, Mme. Renaud and Tabarro
- "Look Over There" – Georges
- "Cocktail Counterpoint" – Georges, Edouard Dindon, Mme. Dindon and Jacob
- "The Best of Times" – Albin, Jacqueline and Company
- "Look Over There" (Reprise) – Jean-Michel
- "La Cage aux Folles" (Reprise) – Georges
- Finale – Company

== Recordings ==
There are several cast recordings available for the show, including the Original Broadway cast, the Original Australian cast and the 2010 Broadway revival cast. No recording was made for the 2004 revival.

Albin's Act I finale number, "I Am What I Am", was recorded by Gloria Gaynor for her 1984 album I Am Gloria Gaynor and proved to be one of her biggest hits. It was also recorded by other artists, including Shirley Bassey, Tony Bennett, Pia Zadora and John Barrowman. It also became a rallying cry of the Gay Pride movement.

Perry Como recorded "The Best of Times" for his 1987 album Today.

A rendition of "The Best of Times" was performed by the cast through various stunts during the finale of the 2006 film Jackass Number Two.

== Awards and nominations ==
La Cage became the first musical to twice win the Tony for Best Revival, in addition to its original Best Musical Tony: a triumph for all its Broadway productions. The show has garnered five nominations for Tony Award for Best Actor in a Musical from its three Broadway productions, twice for actors in the role of Georges and three times for those in the role of Albin; winning the award twice, both for actors playing Albin.

=== Original Broadway production ===
| Year | Award | Category | Nominee | Result |
|---|---|---|---|---|
| 1984 | Tony Award | Best Musical | | Won |
| 1984 | Tony Award | Best Book of a Musical | Harvey Fierstein | Won |
| 1984 | Tony Award | Best Original Score | Jerry Herman | Won |
| 1984 | Tony Award | Best Performance by a Leading Actor in a Musical | George Hearn | Won |
| 1984 | Tony Award | Best Performance by a Leading Actor in a Musical | Gene Barry | Nominated |
| 1984 | Tony Award | Best Direction of a Musical | Arthur Laurents | Won |
| 1984 | Tony Award | Best Choreography | Scott Salmon | Nominated |
| 1984 | Tony Award | Best Costume Design | Theoni V. Aldredge | Won |
| 1984 | Tony Award | Best Lighting Design | Jules Fisher | Nominated |
| 1984 | Drama Desk Award | Outstanding Book of a Musical | Harvey Fierstein | Nominated |
| 1984 | Drama Desk Award | Outstanding Actor in a Musical | George Hearn | Won |
| 1984 | Drama Desk Award | Outstanding Actor in a Musical | Gene Barry | Nominated |
| 1984 | Drama Desk Award | Outstanding Music | Jerry Herman | Won |
| 1984 | Drama Desk Award | Outstanding Lyrics | Jerry Herman | Nominated |
| 1984 | Drama Desk Award | Outstanding Orchestrations | Jim Tyler | Nominated |
| 1984 | Drama Desk Award | Outstanding Costume Design | Theoni V. Aldredge | Won |
| 1984 | Drama Desk Award | Outstanding Lighting Design | Jules Fisher | Nominated |

=== 2004 Broadway revival ===
| Year | Award | Category | Nominee | Result |
|---|---|---|---|---|
| 2005 | Tony Award | Best Revival of a Musical | | Won |
| 2005 | Tony Award | Best Performance by a Leading Actor in a Musical | Gary Beach | Nominated |
| 2005 | Tony Award | Best Choreography | Jerry Mitchell | Won |
| 2005 | Tony Award | Best Costume Design | William Ivey Long | Nominated |
| 2005 | Drama Desk Award | Outstanding Revival of a Musical | | Won |
| 2005 | Drama Desk Award | Outstanding Choreography | Jerry Mitchell | Won |
| 2005 | Drama Desk Award | Outstanding Costume Design | William Ivey Long | Nominated |

=== 2008 London revival ===
| Year | Award | Category | Nominee | Result |
|---|---|---|---|---|
| 2009 | Laurence Olivier Award | Best Musical Revival | | Won |
| 2009 | Laurence Olivier Award | Best Actor in a Musical | Douglas Hodge | Won |
| 2009 | Laurence Olivier Award | Best Actor in a Musical | Denis Lawson | Nominated |
| 2009 | Laurence Olivier Award | Best Performance in a Supporting Role in a Musical | Jason Pennycooke | Nominated |
| 2009 | Laurence Olivier Award | Best Director of a Musical | Terry Johnson | Nominated |
| 2009 | Laurence Olivier Award | Best Theatre Choreographer | Lynne Page | Nominated |
| 2009 | Laurence Olivier Award | Best Costume Design | Matthew Wright | Nominated |

=== 2010 Broadway revival ===
| Year | Award | Category | Nominee | Result |
|---|---|---|---|---|
| 2010 | Tony Award | Best Revival of a Musical | | Won |
| 2010 | Tony Award | Best Performance by a Leading Actor in a Musical | Kelsey Grammer | Nominated |
| 2010 | Tony Award | Best Performance by a Leading Actor in a Musical | Douglas Hodge | Won |
| 2010 | Tony Award | Best Performance by a Featured Actor in a Musical | Robin de Jesús | Nominated |
| 2010 | Tony Award | Best Direction of a Musical | Terry Johnson | Won |
| 2010 | Tony Award | Best Choreography | Lynne Page | Nominated |
| 2010 | Tony Award | Best Orchestrations | Jason Carr | Nominated |
| 2010 | Tony Award | Best Scenic Design | Tim Shortall | Nominated |
| 2010 | Tony Award | Best Costume Design | Matthew Wright | Nominated |
| 2010 | Tony Award | Best Lighting Design | Nick Richings | Nominated |
| 2010 | Tony Award | Best Sound Design | Jonathan Deans | Nominated |
| 2010 | Drama Desk Award | Outstanding Revival of a Musical | | Won |
| 2010 | Drama Desk Award | Outstanding Actor in a Musical | Douglas Hodge | Won |
| 2010 | Drama Desk Award | Outstanding Featured Actor in a Musical | Robin de Jesús | Nominated |
| 2010 | Drama Desk Award | Outstanding Director of a Musical | Terry Johnson | Nominated |
| 2010 | Drama Desk Award | Outstanding Choreography | Lynne Page | Nominated |
| 2010 | Drama Desk Award | Outstanding Costume Design | Matthew Wright | Won |
| 2010 | Drama Desk Award | Outstanding Sound Design | Jonathan Deans | Nominated |

== See also ==
- The Birdcage
- La Cage aux Folles (film)
