= Private practice =

Private practice or private practices may refer to:

- Private sector practice
  - Practice of law
  - Sole proprietorship, as opposed to working within a partnership, corporation, or governmental body
- Private Practice (TV series), an American medical drama
- Private Practice (album), released in 1978 by Dr. Feelgood
- Private Practices: The Story of a Sex Surrogate, a 1985 documentary film by Kirby Dick
- Private Practices (book), a 2011 book by Naoko Wake
