= This Film Is Not Yet Rated =

2006 documentary film by Kirby Dick

- Theatrical release poster
- Directed by: Kirby Dick
- Written by: Kirby Dick; Eddie Schmidt; Matt Patterson
- Produced by: Eddie Schmidt
- Starring: Kirby Dick; Becky Altringer
- Cinematography: Shana Hagan; Kirsten Johnson; Amy Vincent
- Edited by: Matthew Clarke
- Music by: Michael S. Patterson
- Production company: Chain Camera
- Distributed by: IFC Films
- Release dates: January 25, 2006 (Sundance); September 1, 2006 (United States)
- Running time: 98 minutes
- Country: United States
- Language: English
- Box office: $339,609

This Film Is Not Yet Rated is a 2006 American documentary film about the Motion Picture Association of America's rating system and its effect on American culture, directed by Kirby Dick and produced by Eddie Schmidt. It premiered at the 2006 Sundance Film Festival and received a limited theatrical release on September 1, 2006. IFC, the film's distributor, aired the film later that year.

The film discusses a number of alleged disparities in the ratings the MPAA gives films and the feedback it gives filmmakers based on whether the project is a studio or independent film, whether the questionable content is violent or sexual in nature, and whether sexual content is heterosexual or homosexual and it centers on male or female pleasure.

The film includes numerous clips from films rated NC-17 to illustrate content that had garnered the rating. Therefore, the MPAA rated an early version of the film NC-17 due to "some graphic sexual content". Dick appealed this rating so he could chronicle both the rating and appeals process of the early version of the film in the final version, which, true to the title, is not rated. (It should however be noted that this film has been classified in the UK by the BBFC, and has been classified at 18. The 18 rating has much less stigma in the UK than NC-17 has in the USA.)

== Themes and discussion ==
Much of the film's press coverage was devoted to Dick and his crew's use of private investigator Becky Altringer to unmask the identities of the ratings and appeals board members.

Other revelations in the film include:

- That many ratings board members either have children 18 and older or have no children at all (typically, the MPAA has suggested it hires only parents with children between the ages of 5 and 17)
- That the board seems to treat homosexual material much more harshly than heterosexual material (this assertion is supported by an MPAA spokesperson’s statement in USA Today that "We don't create standards; we just follow them")
- That some sexual activities are frequently treated more harshly when it involves female orgasm or nontraditional sexual activities
- That NC-17 ratings often significantly reduce a film's chances of success at the box office and overall commercial success, because many movie theaters will not show NC-17 films, and, if they do, it is for very limited time periods
- That NC-17 ratings are also harmful to home media sales, as many brick and mortar retailers do not rent or sell NC-17 or unrated movies
- That harsher film ratings are particularly detrimental to smaller and independent filmmakers, who often do not have the financial and professional support of major distribution companies
- That the board's raters receive no training and are deliberately chosen because of their lack of expertise in media literacy or child development
- That senior raters have direct contact in the form of mandatory meetings with studio personnel after movie screenings
- That the MPAA's appeals board is just as secretive as the ratings board, its members being mostly movie theater chain and studio executives
- That the appeals board includes two members of the clergy, one Catholic priest (Father Dave) and one Protestant (James Wall), who may or may not have voting power

The film sparked some interest in the press when the MPAA rated it NC-17 for "some graphic sexual content". Then, when it premiered at Sundance, it was discovered that the rating process for an early version of the film and Dick’s appeal of that rating were depicted in the finished film. As the additional footage changed the film significantly, the NC-17 could no longer be used for the finished film, which would need to be resubmitted to the MPAA to receive a rating of its own. It never was, however, so the film was released without a rating.

After Sundance, the film went on to draw crowds at many other festivals, including South by Southwest and the Seattle International Film Festival, and received a theatrical release in fall 2006.

== Interviews ==
Those interviewed in the film include:

- Kimberly Peirce, director of Boys Don't Cry
- Jon Lewis, author of Hollywood v. Hardcore and film professor at Oregon State University
- David Ansen, film critic at Newsweek
- Martin Garbus, First Amendment attorney and filmmakers' representative at appeals
- Wayne Kramer, director of The Cooler
- Paul Dergarabedian, box office analyst (Media by Numbers)
- Kevin Smith, director of Clerks and Jersey Girl
- John Waters, director of A Dirty Shame
- Matt Stone, producer of Orgazmo, South Park, and Team America: World Police
- Richard Heffner, former rating board chairman
- Bingham Ray, co-founder of October Films and former president of United Artists
- Joel Federman, author of Media Ratings
- Jay Landers, former MPAA rater
- Stephen Farber, former MPAA rater
- Dr Dottie Hamilton, author of Hollywood's Silent Partner
- Maria Bello, actress in The Cooler
- Mark Urman, head of ThinkFilm
- Allison Anders, director of Gas Food Lodging
- Mary Harron, director of American Psycho
- Jamie Babbit, director of But I'm a Cheerleader
- Darren Aronofsky, director of Requiem for a Dream
- Dr. Theresa Webb of Southern California Injury Prevention Research Center at UCLA
- Michael Tucker, co-director of Gunner Palace
- David L. Robb, author of Operation Hollywood
- Lawrence Lessig, copyright attorney, author, and law professor at Stanford Law School
- Atom Egoyan, director of Where the Truth Lies
- Michael McClellan, appeals board member
- James Wall, Methodist minister and appeals board member since 1968

== MPAA rating board ==
According to the investigation depicted in the film, the following people were, as of 2006, members of the MPAA rating board, also known as CARA (Classification and Rating Administration). Included is the personal information the film revealed about them, such as their age, the age of their children, and how long they had been on the board. These details were significant in the context of the film's critique of the MPAA ratings process, as the MPAA had said (according to the film) that the review board was composed of average American parents, with children and teenagers between the ages of 5 and 17, who serve on the board for less than seven years.

- Head of the Board: Joan Graves (the only member of the board whose identity the MPAA had already made public)
- Anthony "Tony" Hey – 61; age of children: 16, 28, 30
- Barry Freeman – 45; elementary-school-aged children
- Arlene Bates – 44; age of children: 15 and 23
- Matt Ioakimedes – 46; age of children: 17 and 20 (had served as a rater for 9 years, as of 2005)
- Joan Worden – 56; age of children: 18 (twins)
- Scott Young – 51; age of children: 22 and 24 (next-door neighbor of Arlene Bates)
- Joann Yatabe – 61; age of children: 22 and 25
- Howard Friedkin – 47; no children? (aspiring screenwriter)
- Corri Jones – age of children: 3 and 8

== MPAA appeals board ==
According to the investigation depicted in the film, the following people were, as of 2006, members of the MPAA appeals board:

- Matt Brandt, President, Trans-Lux Theaters
- Pete Cole, film buyer, The Movie Experience
- Bruce Corwin, chairman and CEO, Metropolitan Theatres
- Alan Davy, film buyer, Regal Entertainment Group
- Mike Doban, president, Arcangelo Entertainment
- Harry Forbes, representative, United States Conference of Catholic Bishops
- Steve Gilula, CEO, Fox Searchlight Pictures
- Frank Haffar, COO, Maya Cinemas
- John Lodigian, vice president of sales, Sony Pictures
- Michael McClellan, vice president and film buyer, Landmark Theatres
- Milton Moritz, CA/NV chapter president, North American Theatre Owners
- James Wall, United Methodist Church minister representative, National Council of Churches
- Len Westenberg, VP of operations, west coast division, Loews Cineplex Theatres
- Jonathan Wolf, Managing Director, American Film Market

== Fair use ==
This Film Is Not Yet Rated incorporates clips from a number of films to illustrate its criticisms of the MPAA rating board. Dick had originally planned to license the clips from their owners, but discovered that studio licensing agreements would have prohibited him from using this material to criticize the entertainment industry. This prompted him, alongside prominent copyright attorney Michael C. Donaldson, to invoke the fair use doctrine, which permits limited use of copyrighted material to provide analysis and criticism of published works. The film's success using this tactic spurred interest in fair use, especially among documentary filmmakers.

== MPAA infringements ==
Before Dick sent the film to the MPAA to receive a rating, he was assured that the tape he submitted would not be viewed for any purpose other than rating and that no copies would be made or distributed, but, on January 24, 2006, the MPAA admitted to making duplicates of the film contrary to Dick's wishes. However, they contended that doing so did not constitute copyright infringement or a violation of the Digital Millennium Copyright Act, and said the privacy of the raters themselves might have been violated by Dick in the course of making the film, but no complaint had been filed against him. Dick's lawyer, Michael Donaldson, requested that the MPAA destroy all copies of the film in their possession and notify him of who had seen the film and received copies.

The DVD release of the film contains deleted scenes that show phone calls where Dick was assured by representatives of the MPAA that no copy would be made, as well as the one during which he found out that a copy had indeed been created.

== Reception ==
On review aggregator website Rotten Tomatoes, the film has an approval rating of 84% based on 115 reviews, with an average rating of 7.2/10. The critical consensus reads: "A fascinating and entertaining film that will open many eyes to the often-questioned tactics of the MPAA and their ratings system." On Metacritic the film has a score of 75 based on reviews from 33 critics.

The film received a wave of favorable coverage by major publications. The magazines Rolling Stone ("terrific ... indispensable"), Entertainment Weekly ("irresistible"), and USA Today ("rated R for raves"), as well as critics such as Roger Ebert ("devastating") and Slate's Dana Stevens ("matter-of-factly presented, and thoroughly entertaining") praised the film for its novel techniques and unprecedented revelations that dispute longstanding MPAA statements about the ratings system.

Some critics disliked the film. David Poland of Movie City News wrote: "Even though it speaks to a subject I think is very important—the failures of the rating system and, specifically the NC-17—the tough, smart research just isn't in the film."

== Awards ==
Award nominations for This Film Is Not Yet Rated
Year	Award	Organization	Category	Result
2006	Austin Film Critics Award	Austin Film Critics Association	Best Documentary	Won
2006	Critics Choice Award	Broadcast Film Critics Association	Best Documentary Feature	Nominated
2007	Golden Trailer Award	Golden Trailer Awards	Best Documentary	Won
2007	GLAAD Media Award	Gay & Lesbian Alliance Against Defamation	Outstanding Documentary	Nominated

== See also ==
- MPAA film rating system
