= Chain Camera =

2001 film by Kirby Dick

- Directed by: Kirby Dick
- Produced by: Eddie Schmidt; Dody Dorn
- Edited by: Matt Clarke
- Music by: Blake Leyh
- Release date: 2001
- Running time: 84 minutes
- Country: United States
- Language: English

Chain Camera is a 2001 American documentary film directed by Kirby Dick about the lives of Los Angeles high school students. It premiered at the 2001 Sundance Film Festival.

== Summary ==
Chain Camera is made up entirely of footage shot by students at John Marshall High School in Los Angeles. The filmmakers gave Hi-8 video cameras to ten students and asked them to record their lives for one week before passing the cameras on to ten new students. This process continued throughout the school year, and the filmmakers then selected 16 student video diaries for the film.

The film's subjects represent diverse backgrounds in terms of race, religion, socio-economic background, gender, and sexual orientation. Most segments feature scenes of the students interacting with friends and family members as well as personal video diaries in which the subjects analyze their lives. Dick has stated that he did not censor any of the students' footage except in situations that might violate child pornography laws, such as a scene in which a teenager performs a simulated sex act using a banana.

Chain Camera's subjects encounter a variety of different situations and discuss how these have affected their lives. Topics include eating disorders, running away from home, suicide, backyard wrestling, racism, nationality, sexuality, family, AIDS, music, alcoholism, political activism, and graffiti art.

== Reception ==
Critics praised the film for its honesty and the diversity of its student subjects. Scott Tobias of The A.V. Club said, "By turns playful, harrowing, intensely moving, and uproariously funny, Chain Camera cuts away all documentary artifice and goes straight to the source, allowing these kids to reveal themselves with the utmost directness and candor." Several critics also made favorable comparisons to Michael Apted's Up series, which has chronicled the lives of several Britons over the course of several decades. Dick has acknowledged Apted's influence and has stated that he plans to follow the Up paradigm by making a sequel film that documents Chain Camera's subjects as adults.
