= The Christian Century =

Christian magazine based in Chicago

- Cover of the December 14, 2010, issue
- Editor/Publisher: Peter W. Marty
- Managing editor: Steve Thorngate
- Categories: Christianity
- Frequency: Monthly
- Circulation: 36,000
- First issue: 1884
- Company: Christian Century Foundation
- Country: United States
- Based in: Chicago, Illinois
- Language: English
- Website: christiancentury.org
- ISSN: 0009-5281

The Christian Century is a Christian magazine based in Chicago, Illinois. Considered the flagship magazine of US mainline Protestantism, the monthly reports on religious news; comments on theological, moral, and cultural issues; and reviews books, movies, and music.

The magazine's editorial stance has been described as "liberal". It describes its own mission as follows:

For decades, the Christian Century has informed and shaped progressive, mainline Christianity. Committed to thinking critically and living faithfully, the magazine explores what it means to believe and live out the Christian faith in our time. As a voice of generous orthodoxy, the Century is both loyal to the church and open to the world.

The Century's current editor and publisher is Peter W. Marty, while Steve Thorngate is its managing editor. Regular columns include:

- From the Editor/Publisher, by Peter W. Marty
- From the Editors
- Screen Time, by Kathryn Reklis
- Voices, by Debie Thomas, Sam Wells, Brian Bantum, Julian DeShazier, Melissa Florer-Bixler, Philip Jenkins, Rachel Mann, Heidi Neumark, Alejandra Oliva, Yolanda Pierce, Jonathan Tran, and Isaac S. Villegas
- On Art

The Century website hosts podcasts by Grace Ji-Sun Kim, Amy Frykholm, Cassidy Hall, Matt Fitzgerald, Matt Gaventa, and Adam Hearlson.

The Century's current contributing editors are: Ross M. Allen, Brian Bantum, M. Craig Barnes, Debra Bendis, Jason Byassee, Lil Copan, Martin B. Copenhaver, Lillian Daniel, Amy Frykholm, Beverly R. Gaventa, Adam Hearlson, David Heim, Philip Jenkins, L. Gregory Jones, Richard A. Kauffman, Celeste Kennel-Shank, Thomas G. Long, Robin W. Lovin, Thomas Lynch, Bill McKibben, Debra Dean Murphy, Kathleen Norris, Stephanie Paulsell, Yolanda Pierce, Kathryn Reklis, Debie Thomas, Emilie M. Townes, Jonathan Tran, Isaac S. Villegas, Miroslav Volf, Grant A. Wacker, Samuel Wells, Reggie Williams, William H. Willimon, Ralph C. Wood, Carol Zaleski.

== History ==
The Christian Century was founded in 1884 as The Christian Oracle in Des Moines, Iowa, as a Disciples of Christ denominational magazine.

In 1900, its editor proposed to rename it Christian Century in response to the great optimism of many Christians at the turn of the 20th century that "genuine Christian faith could live in mutual harmony with the modern developments in science, technology, immigration, communication and culture that were already under way." Around this same time, the Century's offices moved to Chicago.

The magazine did not receive widespread support in its denomination and was sold in a mortgage foreclosure in 1908. It was purchased by Charles Clayton Morrison, who soon labeled the magazine nondenominational. Morrison became a highly influential spokesperson for liberal Christianity, advocating higher criticism of the Bible, as well as the Social Gospel, which included concerns about child labor, women's suffrage, racism, war and pacifism, alcoholism and prohibition, environmentalism, and many other political and social issues. The magazine was a common target for criticism by fundamentalists during the fundamentalist–modernist debate of the early 20th century.

During the Second World War, the magazine helped provide a venue for promotion of ideas by Christian activists who opposed the internment of Japanese Americans. Critiques of the internment policy, by writers such as Galen Fisher, appeared regularly in the Century and helped bring awareness to the situation.

In 1956 the magazine was challenged by the establishment of Christianity Today by Carl F. H. Henry, which sought to present a theologically conservative evangelical viewpoint, while restoring many social concerns abandoned by fundamentalists. Both magazines continue to flourish, with the Century remaining the major independent publication within ecumenical, mainline Protestantism.

The magazine was heavily involved in covering and advocating for the civil rights movement. It sent editors to a march in Selma, Alabama in 1965 and was one of the first national magazines to publish Martin Luther King Jr.'s "Letter from Birmingham Jail" along with six of his other essays. King was also an editor-at-large to the magazine.

In 2008 both Martin E. Marty and former editor James M. Wall concluded long runs as Century columnists.

Other published by the Century over its long history include Jane Addams, W. H. Auden, Karl Barth, Wendell Berry, Walter Brueggemann, H. Emil Brunner, Martin Buber, Pearl S. Buck, Frederick Buechner, Jimmy Carter, Sarah Coakley, James Cone, Mary Daly, Annie Dillard, W. E. B. DuBois, Dwight D. Eisenhower, T. S. Eliot, Billy Graham, Abraham Joshua Heschel, John F. Kennedy, Denise Levertov, C. S. Lewis, Reuben Markham, Thomas Merton, Richard John Neuhaus, Reinhold Niebuhr, Henri Nouwen, Angela Alaimo O'Donnell, Pádraig Ó Tuama, Marilynne Robinson, Rosemary Rutherford, Albert Schweitzer, William Stafford, Barbara Brown Taylor, Paul Tillich, Arnold J. Toynbee, Desmond Tutu, John Updike, Delores S. Williams, Rowan Williams, Christian Wiman, and N. T. Wright.

== Accusations of antisemitism ==
The magazine has been accused of being antisemitic during the editorial reign of Morrison in the 1930s and 1940s. It published articles: opposing American intervention in World War II for the benefit of the Jews persecuted under the Nazis; arguing moral equivalence between an alleged Jewish-nationalist crucifixion of Jesus and the Nazi persecution of Jews; condemning American Jews for maintaining their distinct identity; and a rebuttal to Rabbi Stephen Wise, president of the World Jewish Congress, claiming he was exaggerating the Holocaust. As late as 1944, the magazine published articles such as "A Reply to Screamers" by Fred Eastman, which admonished the suggestion that there was a moral obligation for the United States to aid in the plight of European Jews being murdered during the Holocaust. Marty, writing about the 1940s, described the Christian Century at that time as being an "anti-Zionist" publication.

Beginning in 2012, James M. Wall (editor from 1972 to 1999) served on the editorial board of VNN, an online news and opinion site that the Southern Poverty Law Center identified as a neo-Nazi hate site. Wall's name was retained on the Christian Century masthead from 2012 to 2017, despite his association with VNN, drawing criticism.

In 2017 Wall's name was removed from the masthead. In Christian Century's 2021 obituary of Wall, Marty conceded "Wall's extensive pro-Palestinian writing at times devolved into anti-Semitism." In recent years, the magazine has published both pro-Palestine and pro-Israel authors and argued for a two-state solution to the conflict.

== Sources ==
- Christian Century, "Milestones."
- Elesha Coffman, "A Long Ride on the Mainline," Books and Culture, November 14, 2008.
- Elesha Coffman, The Christian Century and the Rise of the Protestant Mainline. New York: Oxford University Press, 2013. online review
- John Dart, "The Rise and Fall of Protestant Magazines," Christian Century, December 26, 2006,
- Linda-Marie Delloff, "Charles Clayton Morrison: Shaping a Journal's Identity," Christian Century, January 18, 1984.
- Robert Shaffer, "Opposition to Internment."
