= Eddie Schmidt =

American filmmaker

Eddie Schmidt (born August 29, 1970) is an American director, showrunner, producer, writer, commentator and satirist. He is perhaps best known for producing several feature documentaries that premiered at the Sundance Film Festival, including Valentine Road (2013), This Film Is Not Yet Rated (2006), and Twist of Faith (2005), and for directing and showrunning television projects including Ugly Delicious (2018), Chelsea Does (2016), The Case of: JonBenét Ramsey (2016), and Good One: A Show About Jokes (2024).

Schmidt was nominated for two News and Documentary Emmy Awards, for Best Documentary and Outstanding Coverage of a Current News Story - Longform, for Valentine Road, and for the Academy Award for Best Documentary Feature Film for Twist of Faith. From 2009-2011, Schmidt served as President of the IDA (International Documentary Association), and was its interim Executive Director for the latter half of 2008.

== Life and career ==
Born in Staten Island, New York, Schmidt attended Vassar College, where he received an A.B. in Drama/Film in 1992. Later, in 2005, he was named a "Vassar Innovator" by the school, placing him in a distinguished group of alumni from the college's history including Nickelodeon founder Geraldine Laybourne.

== Documentary ==
Schmidt emerged as a producer of feature documentaries with Chain Camera (2001), a groundbreaking look at urban teenage life in which video cameras were given to students at John Marshall High School in Los Angeles and passed around like chain letters. The film premiered at the Sundance Film Festival, and went on to air on Sundance Channel, BBC, and Cinemax, and had a multi-city theatrical run. In 2005, it was released on DVD with deleted scenes and filmmaker commentary.

Chain Camera began a long creative partnership between Schmidt and director Kirby Dick that included The End (2004), which follows several hospice patients and their families nearing the end of life, Twist of Faith (2005), the story of a man confronting the trauma of past sexual abuse by a Catholic priest, and This Film Is Not Yet Rated (2006), an irreverent investigation into the MPAA movie ratings system and American culture, and exposed the secretive industry organization for the first time.

Both Twist of Faith and This Film Is Not Yet Rated premiered at the Sundance Film Festival and were released theatrically. In addition to being one of the highest-rated films on film critic website Rotten Tomatoes, with a 100% positive rating, Twist of Faith was nominated for an Academy Award in 2005. In addition to producing, Schmidt co-wrote This Film Is Not Yet Rated, and was its primary vérité cinematographer as well as a principal cinematographer for Twist of Faith.

While much of Schmidt's documentary work focuses on sobering issues, other films (as Executive Producer) take a lighter or more irreverent approach, including Candyman (2010) about the rise, fall and rebirth of the creator of Jelly Belly jellybeans, and Beauty is Embarrassing, Neil Berkeley's colorful chronicle of visual artist Wayne White. Beauty premiered at the South by Southwest (SXSW) Film Festival and, following a theatrical release, made its broadcast premiere on PBS' Independent Lens, where it was nominated for an Emmy for graphic design.

Schmidt returned to the Sundance Film Festival for the fourth time in 2011 as the producer of Troubadours, directed by music documentarian Morgan Neville. Troubadours, released theatrically before airing on PBS's "American Masters," tells the story of the "rise of the singer-songwriter" in the late 1960s / early 1970s Los Angeles, featuring Carole King, James Taylor, Jackson Browne, David Crosby and Bonnie Raitt. The film was later nominated for an Emmy for Nonfiction Cinematography and aired as part of PBS' Emmy-winning season of "American Masters."

In 2012, Schmidt was asked to contribute a short film to Morgan Spurlock's "Focus Forward" series with GE & Cinelan. The film that Schmidt directed, Good Bread, profiled Homeboy Bakery and premiered at the Los Angeles Film Festival and also screened at the Tribeca Film Festival before making its way to Amazon and other outlets.

2013 brought Schmidt back to the Sundance Film Festival for a fifth time as the producer of Valentine Road, a critically acclaimed documentary that followed the tragic events and aftermath of a school shooting in Oxnard, CA. As the film was nearing completion, the Sandy Hook, CT school shooting tragedy occurred, which was an especially saddening parallel for Schmidt, who spent his teenage years growing up there. Valentine Road was lauded for its complex portrayal of a community and later nominated for two News & Documentary Emmys.

From 2014-2016, Schmidt again collaborated with director Neil Berkeley as Executive Producer of Berkeley's latest feature documentary, Gilbert, out in 2017.

== Television ==
Schmidt collaborated with longtime creative partner Morgan Neville for the critically acclaimed food and culture docuseries Ugly Delicious, which sees restaurateur (Momofuku, Ssäm Bar, Má Pêche, Milk Bar, etc.) and author David Chang explore the cultural, social and emotional resonance of food on a global level, with episodes "organized around dishes rather than destinations." In April 2018, the New York Times called Ugly Delicious one of "The Eight Recent Netflix Original Series That Are Worth Your Time," calling out the "Homecooking" episode, in which Chang and longtime creative collaborator Peter Meehan, a food writer, travel to Change's Virginia home for a Korean-American Thanksgiving celebration. Rotten Tomatoes called Ugly Delicious 100% Fresh!

Schmidt combined his documentary and comedy backgrounds as director and executive producer (showrunner) of Chelsea Handler's Netflix docuseries, Chelsea Does (2016), his third collaboration with Morgan Neville and first with Netflix. In each hour-long episode, Chelsea examines a different topic - marriage, Silicon Valley, racism, and drugs - through conversations with friends, family, and experts ranging from Los Angeles matchmakers to American civil rights activist Al Sharpton. The documentary premiered at Sundance Film Festival in January 2016 and received favorable reviews from Entertainment Weekly, LA Times, Vulture, and The Hollywood Reporter.

For his next project, Schmidt again took the lead with CBS's The Case of: JonBenét Ramsey (2016), a two-part documentary miniseries about the unsolved murder of JonBenet Ramsey in Boulder, Colorado on December 26, 1996 for which he was executive producer (showrunner) and director. The series premiere, scheduled against the Emmy's, attracted 10.3 million viewers and received praise from Colorado Governor Bill Owens for "stripping away the many myths surrounding this horrible case and presenting factually and unemotionally an unbiased account of this tragedy."

Eddie is an executive producer and director of the History Channel's "In Search Of" reboot, with actor Zachary Quinto traveling the world to investigate and explore unexplained phenomena, in the spirit of the original show's 1970s host, Leonard Nimoy.

Good One: A Show About Jokes, Peacock's adaptation of Jesse David Fox's Vulture podcast Good One, takes a close look at the craft of comedy. Featuring Mike Birbiglia and with executive producers including Seth Meyers, Eddie directed and executive produced (as showrunner).

== Other media ==
In addition to producing and directing, Schmidt has appeared as a pop culture pundit and storyteller on other series and specials.

He guested several times on G4's Attack of the Show, as well as appeared on MSNBC, IFC, CNN and other outlets to discuss his work as a documentarian and give his expert opinion on everything from award nominations to film distribution. In 2012, he was interviewed for an article in The Atlantic about access to global television and film content, in which he spoke about the future of online streaming. He often moderates panels at film festivals or events, conducting talks with other well-known filmmakers and content creators.

In 2011, Schmidt was one of six documentary experts brought in as a program consultant to hash out Current TV's final 50 Documentaries to See Before You Die, which were then counted down in a summer mini-series hosted by Morgan Spurlock. Schmidt also appears on-camera in the series discussing films like Truth or Dare, Dogtown, Z-Boys and Gasland. Further, Schmidt is featured in two documentaries directed by Jeffrey Schwarz for Starz/Encore, In the Gutter (2008) and Sex and the Cinema (2009).

Schmidt has appeared on various podcasts and radio shows including Pointless Podcast, The Reality of Reality, KCRW's To the Point, Good Food, and The Business. Most notably, he appears as himself, along with Ira Glass and his own parents, in a 2004 episode of National Public Radio's This American Life ("Family Legend").

Schmidt also orchestrated the distribution of Harry Shearer's feature documentary The Big Uneasy.

== Non-Profit and Public Works ==
In addition to his film and television career, Schmidt served as the Board President of the IDA (International Documentary Association), a major, nonprofit community and resource for nonfiction filmmakers, since 2009. For the latter half of 2008, Schmidt served as the organization's day-to-day interim executive director, overseeing its 2008 DocuWeeks Theatrical Showcase and the 2008 IDA Documentary Awards, hosted by Morgan Spurlock, and honoring Werner Herzog.

During his time with the organization, Schmidt helped lobby lawmakers for filmmakers' rights with regard to fair use and net neutrality, among others. During filmmaker Joe Berlinger’s battle with oil giant Chevron over all 600 hours of his film Crude, Schmidt engineered an open letter signed by over 200 filmmakers, including 20 Oscar-winners, as well as supplying an amicus brief for Berlinger’s court case.

== Author and Satirist ==
Schmidt, along with MJ Loheed and Matt Patterson, authored the book, The Finger: A Comprehensive Guide To Flipping Off (1998). A definitive look at the middle finger gesture and its place in popular culture, featuring cameos from John Waters, Harry Shearer, Ice Cube, and Julie Delpy, the book quickly became a top-seller during the 1998/1999 holiday season, hitting #75 on amazon.com, receiving a nomination for an American Library Award, and named literary "Pick of the Week" by the LA Weekly.

Schmidt, along with Patterson and Loheed, were pioneering internet satirists with the website ooze.com, one of the first digital humor publications to exist as early as 1993. Excerpts from ooze.com appeared in the McGraw-Hill book Internet Insider (1995), and the 'zine was hailed alongside the Onion in magazines such as Yahoo! Internet Life.

In the late 1990s, ooze began to incorporate video into its satire, receiving worldwide attention for mocking Fundamentalist Christians with "The Force Is A Tool of Satan," a fake video and website purporting to represent zealous Fundamentalists offended by the Star Wars myth. The group performed live and produced numerous video pranks targeting celebrities, PETA, tourism, and mainstream pornography, with their stunts reaching over 500,000 views on YouTube. When a planned TV project for Fox TV Studios starring the group failed to get picked up, ooze disbanded - but the next year Schmidt's documentary Chain Camera debuted at Sundance.

== Personal life ==
In 2001, Schmidt married production designer Rachel Kamerman (Gilmore Girls; Pretty Little Liars; The Fosters). They live in Los Angeles with their son.
