= List of awards and nominations received by Guillermo del Toro =

Guillermo del Toro awards and nominations
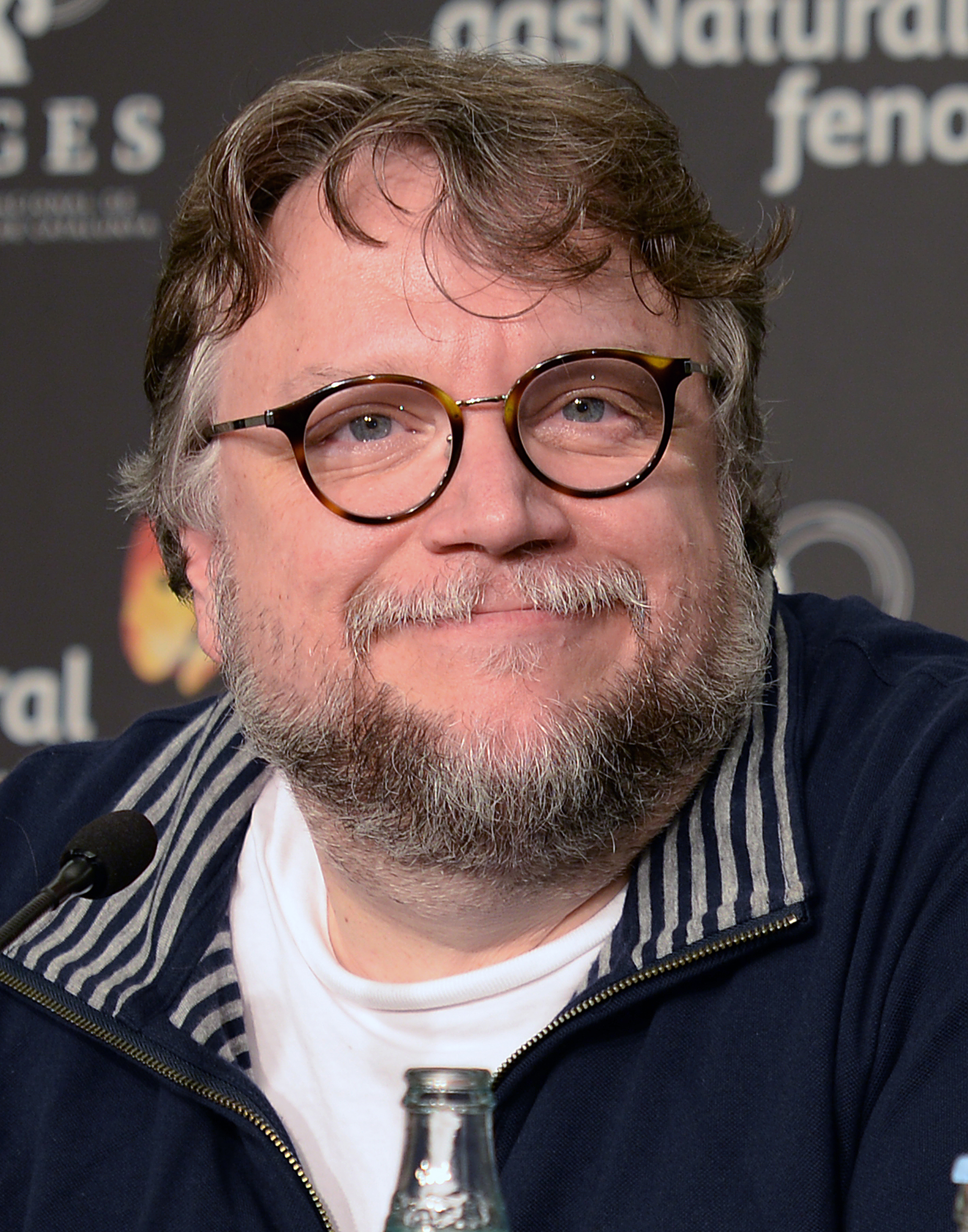
- Del Toro at the Sitges Film Festival in 2017
Awards and nominations
Award	Wins	Nominations
Academy Awards	3	8
Annie Awards	2	4
Ariel Awards	6	6
BAFTA Awards	2	5
Cannes Film Festival	1	2
Critics' Choice Movie Awards	3	10
Daytime Emmy Awards	1	5
Fangoria Chainsaw Awards	0	3
Golden Globe Awards	2	7
Goya Awards	1	3
Gotham Awards	1	1
Hugo Awards	1	4
Independent Spirit Awards	0	1
Saturn Awards	6	16
Other Awards	25	58

Totals (Note: Certain award groups do not simply award one winner. They acknowledge several different recipients, have runners-up, and have third place. Since this is a specific recognition and is different from losing an award, runner-up mentions are considered wins in this award tally. For simplification and to avoid errors, each award in this list has been presumed to have had a prior nomination.)
- Wins: 51
- Nominations: 115

The following is a list of awards and nominations received by Guillermo del Toro.

Guillermo del Toro is a Mexican filmmaker and author who has received nominations for eight Academy Awards, winning three, and seven Golden Globe Awards, with two wins. He has also won three BAFTA Awards, three Critics' Choice Movie Awards, two Annie Awards, a Producers Guild of America Award, a Directors Guild of America Award, a Daytime Emmy Award, six Ariel Awards, and the Golden Lion.

Del Toro won the Academy Awards for Best Picture and Best Director for the romantic fantasy The Shape of Water (2017) and Best Animated Feature for Guillermo del Toro's Pinocchio (2022). He was Oscar-nominated for Best Original Screenplay for dark fantasy Pan's Labyrinth (2006) and The Shape of Water and Best Picture for the neo-noir Nightmare Alley (2021).

For directing the animated film Guillermo del Toro's Pinocchio he won the Academy Award, BAFTA Award for Best Animated Film, and the Golden Globe Award for Best Animated Feature Film. For his work on television, he received the Daytime Emmy Award for Outstanding Directing in an Animated Program for the Netflix series Trollhunters: Tales of Arcadia in 2017. He received a nomination for the Daytime Emmy Award for Outstanding Children's Animated Program for the Netflix series Wizards: Tales of Arcadia in 2021.

== Major associations ==
=== Academy Awards ===
Year	Category	Nominated work	Result	Ref.
2006	Best Original Screenplay	Pan's Labyrinth	Nominated	
2017	Best Picture	The Shape of Water	Won	
2017	Best Director	The Shape of Water	Won	
2017	Best Original Screenplay	The Shape of Water	Nominated	
2021	Best Picture	Nightmare Alley	Nominated	
2022	Best Animated Feature	Guillermo del Toro's Pinocchio	Won	
2025	Best Picture	Frankenstein	Nominated	
2025	Best Adapted Screenplay	Frankenstein	Nominated	

=== BAFTA Awards ===
Year	Category	Nominated work	Result	Ref.
British Academy Film Awards
2007	Best Original Screenplay	Pan's Labyrinth	Nominated	
2018	Best Film	The Shape of Water	Nominated	
2018	Best Direction	The Shape of Water	Won	
2018	Best Original Screenplay	The Shape of Water	Nominated	
2023	Best Animated Film	Guillermo del Toro's Pinocchio	Won	

=== Emmy Awards ===
Year	Category	Nominated work	Result	Ref.
Daytime Emmy Awards
2017	Outstanding Special Class Animated Program	Trollhunters: Tales of Arcadia	Nominated	
2017	Outstanding Directing in an Animated Program	Trollhunters: Tales of Arcadia	Won	
2018	Outstanding Children's Animated Program	Trollhunters: Tales of Arcadia	Nominated	
2019	Outstanding Directing in an Animated Program	Trollhunters: Tales of Arcadia	Nominated	
2021	Outstanding Children's Animated Program	Wizards: Tales of Arcadia	Nominated	

=== Golden Globe Awards ===
Year	Category	Nominated work	Result	Ref.
2018	Best Motion Picture – Drama	The Shape of Water	Nominated	
2018	Best Director – Motion Picture	The Shape of Water	Won	
2018	Best Screenplay – Motion Picture	The Shape of Water	Nominated	
2023	Best Motion Picture – Animated	Guillermo del Toro's Pinocchio	Won	
2023	Best Original Song	"Ciao Papa"	Nominated	
2026	Best Motion Picture – Drama	Frankenstein	Nominated	
2026	Best Director – Motion Picture	Frankenstein	Nominated	

== Industry awards ==
Organizations	Year	Category	Work	Result	Ref.
Art Directors Guild Awards	2022	William Cameron Menzies Award	—N/a	Won	
Capri Hollywood International Film Festival	2022	Best Animated Feature	Guillermo del Toro's Pinocchio	Won	
Capri Hollywood International Film Festival	2025	Best Picture	Frankenstein	Won	
Capri Hollywood International Film Festival	2025	Capri Visionary Award	Frankenstein	Won	
Capri Hollywood International Film Festival	2025	Capri Producer Award (Note: Shared with J. Miles Dale and Scott Stuber)	Frankenstein	Won	
Cannes Film Festival	1993	Mercedes-Benz Award	Cronos	Won	
Cannes Film Festival	2006	Palme d'Or	Pan's Labyrinth	Nominated	
Critics' Choice Movie Awards	2018	Best Picture	The Shape of Water	Won	
Critics' Choice Movie Awards	2018	Best Director	The Shape of Water	Won	
Critics' Choice Movie Awards	2018	Best Original Screenplay	The Shape of Water	Nominated	
Critics' Choice Movie Awards	2022	Best Picture	Nightmare Alley	Nominated	
Critics' Choice Movie Awards	2022	Best Director	Nightmare Alley	Nominated	
Critics' Choice Movie Awards	2023	Best Animated Feature	Guillermo del Toro's Pinocchio	Won	
Critics' Choice Movie Awards	2023	Best Song ("Ciao Papa")	Guillermo del Toro's Pinocchio	Nominated	
Critics' Choice Movie Awards	2026	Best Picture	Frankenstein	Nominated	
Critics' Choice Movie Awards	2026	Best Director	Frankenstein	Nominated	
Critics' Choice Movie Awards	2026	Best Adapted Screenplay	Frankenstein	Nominated	
Directors Guild of America Award	2018	Outstanding Directing – Feature Film	The Shape of Water	Won	
Directors Guild of America Award	2026	Outstanding Directing – Feature Film	Frankenstein	Nominated	
Gotham Awards	2006	World Cinema Tribute Award	—N/a	Won	
Goya Awards	2007	Best Film	Pan's Labyrinth	Nominated	
Goya Awards	2007	Best Director	Pan's Labyrinth	Nominated	
Goya Awards	2007	Best Original Screenplay	Pan's Labyrinth	Won	
Hollywood Walk of Fame	2019	Motion Pictures	—N/a	Won	
Hugo Awards	2007	Best Dramatic Presentation, Long Form	Pan's Labyrinth	Won	
Hugo Awards	2009	Best Dramatic Presentation, Long Form	Hellboy II: The Golden Army	Nominated	
Hugo Awards	2013	Best Dramatic Presentation, Long Form	The Hobbit: An Unexpected Journey	Nominated	
Hugo Awards	2014	Best Dramatic Presentation, Long Form	Pacific Rim	Nominated	
Imagine Film Festival	2002	Méliès d'Argent	The Devil's Backbone	Won	
Independent Spirit Awards	2007	Best Feature	Pan's Labyrinth	Nominated	
Producers Guild of America Awards	2018	Best Theatrical Motion Picture	The Shape of Water	Won	
Producers Guild of America Awards	2023	Best Animated Motion Picture	Guillermo del Toro's Pinocchio	Won	
Producers Guild of America Awards	2026	Best Theatrical Motion Picture	Frankenstein	Nominated	
Venice Film Festival	2017	Golden Lion	The Shape of Water	Won	
Venice Film Festival	2025	Golden Lion	Frankenstein	Nominated	
Writers Guild of America Awards	2018	Best Original Screenplay	The Shape of Water	Nominated	
Writers Guild of America Awards	2026	Best Adapted Screenplay	Frankenstein	Nominated	

== Critics awards ==
Year	Organizations	Category	Work	Ref.
1993	Moscow International Film Festival	Golden St. George	Cronos	Nominated
1993	Havana Film Festival	Best First Work	Cronos	Won
1993	Sitges Film Festival	Best Film	Cronos	Nominated
1993	Sitges Film Festival	Best Screenplay	Cronos	Won
1994	Brussels International Fantastic Film Festival	Silver Raven	Cronos	Won
1995	Association of Latin Entertainment Critics Award	Best First Work	Cronos	Won
1997	Sitges Film Festival	Best Film	Mimic	Nominated
1998	ALMA Award	Outstanding Latino Director of a Feature Film	Mimic	Nominated
2002	Sitges Film Festival	Time-Machine Honorary Award		Won
2004	Imagen Award	Creative Achievement Award		Won
2004	Imagen Award	Best Director - Film	Hellboy	Won
2005	Bram Stoker Award	Best Screenplay	Hellboy	Nominated
2006	Austin Film Critics Association Awards	Best Foreign Film	Pan's Labyrinth	Won
2006	Dublin Film Critics Circle Award	Best Director	Pan's Labyrinth	Nominated
2007	Empire Award	Best Director	Pan's Labyrinth	Nominated
2007	Austin Film Critics Association Awards	Best Film	Pan's Labyrinth	Nominated
2007	Austin Film Critics Association Awards	Best Original Screenplay	Pan's Labyrinth	Won
2007	Fantasporto	Best International Fantasy Film Award	Pan's Labyrinth	Won
2007	Film Critics Circle of Australia Award	Best Foreign Language Film	Pan's Labyrinth	Nominated
2007	London Critics Circle Film Award	Director of the Year	Pan's Labyrinth	Nominated
2007	London Critics Circle Film Award	Screenwriter of the Year	Pan's Labyrinth	Nominated
2007	National Society of Film Critics Award	Best Director	Pan's Labyrinth	Nominated
2007	Online Film Critics Society Award	Best Director	Pan's Labyrinth	Nominated
2007	Online Film Critics Society Award	Best Original Screenplay	Pan's Labyrinth	Won
2007	Palm Springs International Film Festival	Best Foreign Language Film	Pan's Labyrinth	Won
2007	Association of Latin Entertainment Critics Award	Best Film	Pan's Labyrinth	Won
2007	Imagen Award	Best Director - Film	Pan's Labyrinth	Won
2008	Bodil Award	Bodil Award for Best Non-American Film	Pan's Labyrinth	Won
2008	Nebula Award	Best Script	Pan's Labyrinth	Won
2008	Empire Award	Inspiration Award		Nominated
2013	Hollywood Film Festival	Hollywood Movie Award	Pacific Rim	Nominated
2014	Ray Bradbury Award	Outstanding Dramatic Presentation	Pacific Rim	Nominated
2017	Los Angeles Film Critics Association Award	Best Director	The Shape of Water	Won
2017	Detroit Film Critics Society Award	Best Director	The Shape of Water	Nominated
2017	Detroit Film Critics Society Award	Best Screenplay	The Shape of Water	Nominated
2017	Boston Society of Film Critics Award	Best Director	The Shape of Water	Runner-up
2017	Washington D.C. Area Film Critics Association Award	Best Director	The Shape of Water	Nominated
2017	Washington D.C. Area Film Critics Association Award	Best Original Screenplay	The Shape of Water	Nominated
2017	San Francisco Film Critics Circle Award	Best Director	The Shape of Water	Won
2017	San Francisco Film Critics Circle Award	Best Original Screenplay	The Shape of Water	Nominated
2017	San Diego Film Critics Society Award	Best Director	The Shape of Water	Nominated
2017	Chicago Film Critics Association Award	Best Director	The Shape of Water	Nominated
2017	Chicago Film Critics Association Award	Best Original Screenplay	The Shape of Water	Nominated
2017	Dallas–Fort Worth Film Critics Association	Best Director	The Shape of Water	Won
2017	Dallas–Fort Worth Film Critics Association	Best Screenplay	The Shape of Water	Nominated
2017	St. Louis Film Critics Association Award	Best Director	The Shape of Water	Won
2017	St. Louis Film Critics Association Award	Best Original Screenplay	The Shape of Water	Won
2017	Florida Film Critics Circle Award	Best Director	The Shape of Water	Nominated
2017	Florida Film Critics Circle Award	Best Screenplay	The Shape of Water	Nominated
2017	Online Film Critics Society Award	Best Director	The Shape of Water	Runner-up
2017	Online Film Critics Society Award	Best Original Screenplay	The Shape of Water	Nominated
2018	AACTA International Award	Best Direction	The Shape of Water	Nominated
2018	Houston Film Critics Society Award	Best Director	The Shape of Water	Nominated
2018	London Film Critics' Circle Award	Director of the Year	The Shape of Water	Nominated

== Miscellaneous awards ==
Organizations	Year	Category	Work	Result	Ref.
AARP Movies for Grownups Awards	2018	Best Director	The Shape of Water	Won	
AARP Movies for Grownups Awards	2018	Best Screenwriter	The Shape of Water	Nominated	
AARP Movies for Grownups Awards	2022	Best Director	Nightmare Alley	Nominated	
AARP Movies for Grownups Awards	2022	Best Screenwriter	Nightmare Alley	Nominated	
AARP Movies for Grownups Awards	2026	Best Director	Frankenstein	Won	
Annie Awards	2014	Storyboarding in a Television Production	The Simpsons (Episode: "Treehouse of Horror XXIV")	Nominated	
Annie Awards	2019	Directing in an Animated Television / Broadcast Production	3Below: Tales of Arcadia (Episode: "Terra Incognita, Part 1")	Nominated	
Annie Awards	2022	Best Animated Feature	Guillermo del Toro's Pinocchio	Won	
Annie Awards	2022	Best Directing in a Feature Production	Guillermo del Toro's Pinocchio	Won	
Annie Awards	2022	Best Music in a Feature Production	Guillermo del Toro's Pinocchio	Won	
Ariel Awards	1993	Ariel de Oro	Cronos	Won	
Ariel Awards	1993	Best Director	Cronos	Won	
Ariel Awards	1993	Best Screenplay	Cronos	Won	
Ariel Awards	1993	Best Original Story	Cronos	Won	
Ariel Awards	1993	Best First Work	Cronos	Won	
Ariel Awards	2007	Yuta	Pan's Labyrinth	Won	
Fangoria Chainsaw Awards	2002	Fangoria Hall of Fame	Himself	Inducted	
Fangoria Chainsaw Awards	2005	Best Screenplay	Hellboy	Nominated	
Fangoria Chainsaw Awards	2009	Best Screenplay	Hellboy II: The Golden Army	Nominated	
Fangoria Chainsaw Awards	2016	Best Wide-Release Film	Crimson Peak	Nominated	
Saturn Awards	1998	Best Writing	Mimic	Nominated	
Saturn Awards	2007	Best Director	Pan's Labyrinth	Nominated	
Saturn Awards	2007	Best Writing	Pan's Labyrinth	Nominated	
Saturn Awards	2008	The George Pal Memorial Award		Won	
Saturn Awards	2009	Best Horror Film	Hellboy II: The Golden Army	Won	
Saturn Awards	2014	Best Director	Pacific Rim	Nominated	
Saturn Awards	2015	Best Writing	The Hobbit: The Desolation of Smaug	Nominated	
Saturn Awards	2016	Best Horror Film	Crimson Peak	Won	
Saturn Awards	2016	Best Director	Crimson Peak	Nominated	
Saturn Awards	2016	Best Writing	Crimson Peak	Nominated	
Saturn Awards	2018	Best Fantasy Film	The Shape of Water	Won	
Saturn Awards	2018	Best Director	The Shape of Water	Nominated	
Saturn Awards	2018	Best Writing (with Vanessa Taylor)	The Shape of Water	Nominated	
Saturn Awards	2022	Best Thriller Film	Nightmare Alley	Won	
Saturn Awards	2022	Best Director	Nightmare Alley	Nominated	
Saturn Awards	2022	Best Writing (with Kim Morgan)	Nightmare Alley	Won	

In 2026, del Toro was a recipient of the Inkpot Award at the annual San Diego Comic Con.
