= Amy Ziering =

American filmmaker

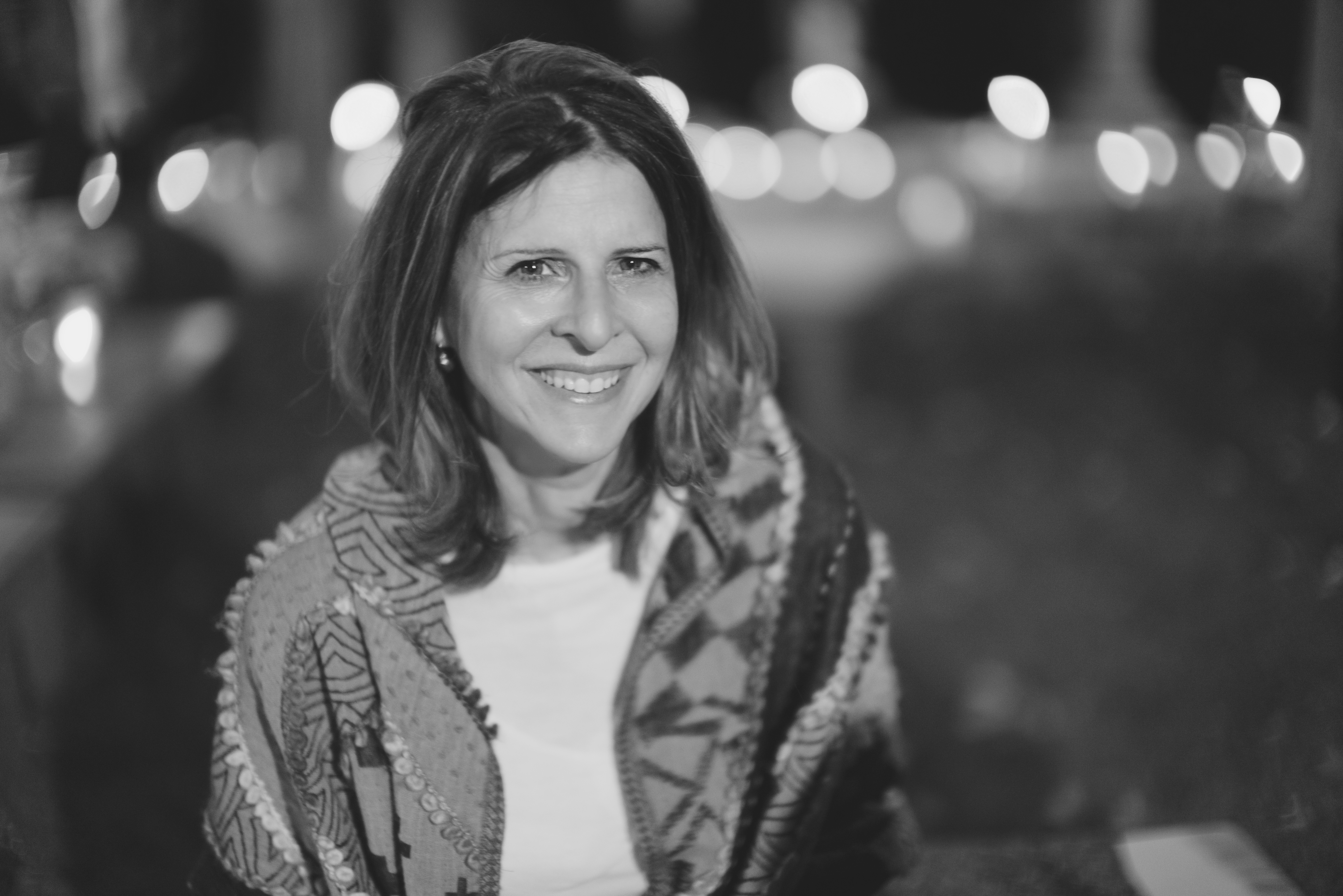
- Ziering in 2020
- Born: September 1962 (age 64); Massachusetts
- Occupations: Producer, director
- Years active: 1998–present
- Children: 3
- Parents: Sigi Ziering (father); Marilyn Ziering (mother)

Amy Ziering (born 1962 in Massachusetts) is an American film producer and director. Mostly known for her work in documentary films, she is a regular collaborator of director Kirby Dick; they co-directed 2002's Derrida and 2020's On the Record, with Ziering also producing several of Dick's films.

In 2013, she received an Academy Award nomination for Best Documentary Feature for producing the Dick-directed film The Invisible War.

== Early life ==
Ziering was born in 1962. She is the daughter of Sigi Ziering, a Holocaust survivor, and Marilyn Ziering. She grew up in Beverly Hills, California. She graduated from Amherst College before pursuing graduate work at Yale University, where she studied with Jacques Derrida.

== Career ==
=== Early career ===
Ziering's first film, Taylor's Campaign (1998), directed by Richard Cohen, followed Ron Taylor, a homeless resident of Santa Monica, as he campaigned for the Santa Monica city council. Martin Sheen narrated.

Ziering then began work on Derrida (2002), a documentary about her former mentor, the French philosopher Jacques Derrida. She co-directed the film with Kirby Dick. It explores Derrida's life and work while questioning the limitations of biography. It won the Golden Gate Award at the 2002 San Francisco International Film Festival.

Ziering next produced a feature narrative, The Memory Thief (2007), directed by Gil Kofman. The film chronicles the experiences of a young man who becomes involved in documenting the experiences of survivors of the Holocaust as his commitment turns into obsession and madness. Ziering collaborated with Dick again on Outrage (2009), a documentary about the lives of closeted gay politicians who legislate against gay rights, as well as the mainstream media's reluctance to report on this subject. It received an Emmy nomination for Outstanding Investigative Journalism.

=== The Invisible War ===
In 2012, she premiered The Invisible War at the Sundance Film Festival, where it received the Audience Award for Best Documentary Feature. The film examines the epidemic of rape in the United States Armed Forces, and has been heralded for exposing a culture of sexual abuse at Marine Barracks Washington. Several government officials have commented on the film's influence on policy, including Secretary of Defense Leon Panetta, who has said that the film convinced him to implement a wave of reforms designed to reduce the prevalence of military sexual assault.

The film's revelations have also been discussed in congressional hearings and spurred lawmakers to seek better safeguards for assault survivors. Senator Kirsten Gillibrand credits the film with inspiring her to introduce the Military Justice Improvement Act, which would establish an independent judiciary to oversee accusations of sexual assault in the armed forces.

Among other honors, The Invisible War received a nomination for Best Documentary Feature at the 85th Academy Awards and won Emmy Awards for Best Documentary Feature and Outstanding Investigative Journalism.

=== The Hunting Ground ===
In 2015, The Hunting Ground premiered at the 2015 Sundance Film Festival. Produced by Ziering and written and directed by Dick, the documentary is about the incidence of sexual assault on U.S. college campuses and the failed response of college administrators. It was released on February 27, 2015, an edited version aired on CNN on November 22, 2015, and the DVD was released the week of December 1, 2015. It was released on Netflix in March 2016. Lady Gaga recorded an original song, "Til It Happens to You", for the film.

One day before the film's theatrical release, a bipartisan group of 12 U.S. senators, accompanied by the film's lead subjects, Annie Clark and Andrea Pino, reintroduced the Campus Accountability and Safety Act requiring universities to adopt standard practices for weighing sexual charges, and to survey students on the prevalence of assault.

The Hunting Ground was nominated for a 2016 Emmy Award for Exceptional Merit in Documentary Filmmaking and for the Producers Guild of America's Outstanding Producer of Documentary Theatrical Motion Picture award. It won the 2016 Stanley Kramer Award given to "a production, producer or other individual whose achievement or contribution illuminates and raises public awareness of important social issues.The Hunting Ground was also one of the five movies nominated in the Documentary category of the 2016 MTV Movie Awards.

=== The Bleeding Edge ===
The Bleeding Edge premiered at the 2018 Tribeca Film Festival to rave reviews and received further critical acclaim after its worldwide release on Netflix on July 27, 2018. Currently at 100% on Rotten Tomatoes and a New York Times Critic's Pick of the Week, the documentary, written and directed by Dick and produced by Ziering and Amy Herdy, is a deep dive into the $400 billion medical device industry, where the filmmakers find shockingly lax regulations, corporate coverups and profit-driven incentives that put patients at risk daily.

The film's impact was felt immediately as a week before its release, The Bleeding Edge became a part of a national news story when Bayer removed the birth control device Essure from the U.S. market, one of the many devices heavily criticized and warned about in the film. Entertainment Weekly added it to its list of documentaries that have changed the world. The documentary received the George Polk Award for Medical Reporting—one of only a few documentaries to receive the journalistic award—and was nominated for a Peabody Award and the Grierson Award for Best Science Documentary.

=== On the Record ===
On October 23, 2017, Dick and Ziering announced an upcoming film on equity, parity, abuse, and representation in Hollywood. They had begun working on this project while screening The Invisible War. In a statement to media, Ziering said, "Every time we screened that film in Hollywood, actors and executives would come up to us and say that they had had similar experiences right here. So we began working on this project and immediately found ourselves grappling with the same forces that had kept this story silenced for so long. Everyone was frightened about what would happen to their careers, and worried about whether they would be sued. Distributors were unwilling to fund or release the film, and few people were willing to talk on the record."

Once the Harvey Weinstein sexual abuse allegations went public, funding appeared through Impact Partners, which also financed The Hunting Ground and The Invisible War. Ziering said, "People at long last are speaking out in large numbers, and we feel this industry, and the country, is finally ready for an unflinching film about the reality of sexual assault and harassment in Hollywood."

On the Record, Dick and Ziering's film about sexual abuse allegations against Def Jam co-founder Russell Simmons, premiered to a standing ovation at the 2020 Sundance Film Festival. The film, which includes the voices of nine alleged survivors such as Drew Dixon, Sheri Sher, Sil Lai Abrams, Jenny Lumet, and Kelly Cutrone, has received critical acclaim. On review aggregator website Rotten Tomatoes, the film holds an approval rating of 99% based on 71 reviews. The site's critical consensus reads: "On the Record uses harrowing first-person accounts to powerfully and persuasively confront the entrenched sexism of an industry and its culture." On Metacritic, the film has a weighted average score of 84 out of 100, based on 22 critic reviews, indicating "universal acclaim".

=== Allen v. Farrow ===
Dick and Ziering's first documentary series, Allen v. Farrow is a four-part series that examines the sexual assault allegation made against Woody Allen by his adopted daughter Dylan Farrow, who was seven when the abuse allegedly occurred. It follows the custody battle between Allen and his former partner Mia Farrow, his marriage to her adopted daughter Soon-Yi Previn, who is 35 years younger than Allen, and the events of subsequent years. The series premiered on HBO on February 21, 2021, with the last episode airing on March 14, 2021. On Rotten Tomatoes, the series holds an approval rating of 82% based on 56 reviews. On Metacritic, it has a weighted average score of 76 out of 100, based on 25 critics, indicating "generally favorable reviews".

RAINN announced that the series resulted in a nearly 20% increase in calls.

=== Not So Pretty ===
Ziering and Dick directed Not So Pretty, a four-part series about the beauty industry and harmful chemicals in products, narrated by Keke Palmer. It premiered on April 14, 2022, on HBO Max.

== Personal life ==
Ziering has three daughters and resides in Brentwood.

== Filmography ==
Year	Film	Role
1998	Taylor's Campaign	Producer
2002	Derrida	Director, producer
2007	The Memory Thief	Producer
2009	Outrage	Producer
2012	The Invisible War	Producer
2014	The Hunting Ground	Producer
2018	The Bleeding Edge	Producer
2020	On the Record	Director, writer, producer
2021	Allen v. Farrow	Director, producer
2022	Not So Pretty	Director, writer, producer

== Awards and nominations ==
Year	Award	Organization	Work	Category	Result
2002	Golden Gate Award	San Francisco Film Festival	Derrida	Documentary Feature	Won
2002	Grand Jury Prize	Sundance Film Festival	Derrida	Documentary	Nominated
2009	Jury Award	Miami Gay and Lesbian Film Festival	Outrage	Best Documentary	Won
2010	Emmy Award	National Academy of Television Arts and Sciences	Outrage	Outstanding Investigative Journalism: Long Form	Nominated
2012	Audience Award	Sundance Film Festival	The Invisible War	Best Documentary	Won
2012	Nestor Almendros Award	Human Rights Watch Film Festival	The Invisible War	Courage in Filmmaking	Won
2012	Silver Heart Award	Dallas International Film Festival	The Invisible War	Humanitarian Award	Won
2012	Audience Award	Seattle International Film Festival	The Invisible War	Best Documentary	Won
2012	Audience Award	Provincetown International Film Festival	The Invisible War	Best Documentary Feature	Won
2012	Best of Festival	DocuWest International Documentary Film Festival	The Invisible War	Humanitarian Award	Won
2012	Advocacy Award	Peace Over Violence	The Invisible War	Humanitarian Award	Won
2012	IDA Award	International Documentary Association	The Invisible War	Best Feature	Nominated
2012	Audience Award	Gotham Awards	The Invisible War	Audience Award	Nominated
2013	Spirit Award	Film Independent	The Invisible War	Best Documentary	Won
2013	Academy Award	Academy of Motion Picture Arts and Sciences	The Invisible War	Best Documentary Feature	Nominated
2013	Ridenhour Prize	The Nation Institute	The Invisible War	Documentary Film	Won
2013	Gracie Award	Alliance for Women in Media	The Invisible War	Outstanding Producer – News/Non-Fiction	Won
2013	Peabody Award	The Peabody Awards	The Invisible War		Won
2013	Impact Award	BRITDOC Foundation	The Invisible War	Jury Special Commendation	Won
2014	Emmy Award	National Academy of Television Arts and Sciences	The Invisible War	Best Documentary Feature	Won
2014	Emmy Award	National Academy of Television Arts and Sciences	The Invisible War	Outstanding Investigative Journalism – Long Form	Won
2016	Emmy Award	National Academy of Television Arts and Sciences	The Hunting Ground	Exceptional Merit in Documentary Filmmaking	Nominated
2016	PGA Award	PGA Awards	The Hunting Ground	Outstanding Producer of Documentary Theatrical Motion Picture	Nominated
2016	Stanley Kramer Award	PGA Awards	The Hunting Ground	Stanley Kramer Award	Won
2018	George Polk Award	George Polk Awards	The Bleeding Edge	Medical Reporting	Won
2019	Peabody Award	The Peabody Awards	The Bleeding Edge	Documentary Film	Nominated
2019	Grierson Award	Grierson Awards	The Bleeding Edge	Best Science Documentary	Nominated
2021	Image Award	NAACP Image Awards	On the Record	Outstanding Documentary	Nominated
2021	Emmy Award	Primetime Emmy Awards	Allen v. Farrow	Outstanding Documentary or Nonfiction Series	Nominated
2021	Emmy Award	Primetime Emmy Awards	Allen v. Farrow	Outstanding Writing For A Nonfiction Program	Nominated
2021	Emmy Award	Primetime Emmy Awards	Allen v. Farrow	Outstanding Directing For A Documentary/Nonfiction Program	Nominated
2021	TCA Award	Television Critics Association	Allen v. Farrow	Outstanding Achievement in News and Information	Nominated
2021	Grierson Award	Grierson Awards	Allen v. Farrow	Best Documentary Series	Nominated
2022	PGA Award	PGA Awards	Allen v. Farrow	Outstanding Producer of Nonfiction Television	Nominated
2022	IDA Award	International Documentary Association	Not So Pretty	Best Short Form Series	Nominated
