= Valentine Road =

- Film poster
- Directed by: Marta Cunningham
- Produced by: Eddie Schmidt
- Release date: January 2013 (Sundance)

Valentine Road is a documentary film by director Marta Cunningham. In 2008 Cunningham read a Southern Poverty Law Center article about the murder of an openly gay non-conforming 15-year-old, Lawrence King. He was shot and killed in his middle school classroom by 14-year-old classmate Brandon McInerney.

== Plot ==
Investigating the case, Cunningham felt compelled to challenge what she perceived as a homophobic portrayal of King in the mainstream media. She began attending McInerney's pre-trial motions and hearings. "The more she looked into the case, the more she uncovered a web of complications and nuance that just wasn’t being given a fair hearing by the media, let alone the courts."

Embedding herself in the city of Oxnard, California, Cunningham spent five years developing trust with the community and accumulating over 350 hours of footage. The result was an 89-minute documentary described by the Los Angeles Times as a film where: "Cunningham masterfully weaves a kind of cinematic memorial quilt to King, who, just prior to his death, was living in a group home/treatment center away from his adoptive parents. [...] Archival news footage, school surveillance video and courtroom renderings round out this powerful, heartbreaking reminder of the bold, cross-dressing boy with a misplaced crush who was too often deemed the cause of his own murder."

== Honors and awards ==
HBO aired the documentary at the start of their 2013 Fall season. As a result, Valentine Road was nominated for Emmys in the Best Documentary and Best Longform Narrative category at the 35th Annual News & Documentary Emmy Awards.

== Reviews ==
USA Today praised the film as: "Haunting, heartfelt and even handed" recommended that: "Valentine Road should be required viewing in teaching tolerance on middle school and high school campuses."
