= Twist of Faith =

2004 documentary film by Kirby Dick

- Directed by: Kirby Dick
- Produced by: Eddie Schmidt
- Edited by: Matthew Clarke
- Music by: Blake Leyh
- Distributed by: Artistic License
- Release date: August 20, 2004 (premiere)
- Running time: 87 minutes
- Country: United States
- Language: English

Twist of Faith is a 2004 American documentary film about a man who confronts the Catholic Church about the abuse he suffered as a teenager, directed by Kirby Dick. The film was produced for the cable network HBO and screened at the 2005 Sundance Film Festival. It received an Academy Award nomination for Best Documentary Feature.

== Content ==
The film focuses on Tony Comes, a firefighter from Toledo, Ohio, who was first sexually abused by a Catholic priest when he was a fourteen-year-old student at a Catholic high school. Feeling ashamed, Comes kept his secret for nearly 20 years but was forced to confront his past after discovering that the priest, Dennis Gray, was living on the same street as Comes, his wife, and their two young children. Comes decided to go public and bring a lawsuit against the priest and Church leaders who had neglected to take action after reading a series of investigative stories in the Toledo Blade revealing sweeping patterns of abuse and cover up in the diocese—including interviews with other Gray victims.

The filmmakers gave Comes and his wife camcorders which they used to record many of the film's scenes. Twist of Faith also includes other older family footage, including a scene in which Comes explains his abuse to his nine-year-old daughter.

The film also features interviews with several other men who had been abused by Gray, and these survivors reunite to discuss their continuing struggles. Other scenes include Dennis Gray's deposition in which he avoids responding to charges of abuse and coverup, Comes's confrontation with his mother about her decision to stand by the Catholic Church, and Comes's visit to a conference held by the Survivors Network of those Abused by Priests (SNAP).

== Reception ==
The film won acclaim from critics and earned a 100% rating from Rotten Tomatoes based on 19 reviews with an average rating of 8.4/10. The site's consensus reads: "With Twist of Faith, documentarian Kirby Dick follows one man's story in a gripping attempt to unravel the history of sexual abuse within the Catholic Church". Rotten Tomatoes also listed Twist of Faith as the best film of 2005. Metacritic gave the documentary a score of 70 out of 100, based on 9 critics, indicating "generally favorable reviews".

According to The Hollywood Reporter, Twist of Faith is a "touching yet complicated film" which "let victims of sex abuse realize they are not alone." Shawn Hubler of the Los Angeles Times said the film was "filled with important truths about humanity in all its denominations" and Variety's Dennis Harvey saw it as a "powerful and damning look at the long-term impact of sexual abuse." Many critics were particularly impressed by the scenes that Comes and his family had videotaped themselves.

Twist of Faith was nominated for Best Documentary Feature at the 77th Academy Awards and was also in competition for the Grand Jury Prize at the 2005 Sundance Film Festival.

== Maumee Theater controversy ==
In anticipation of the film's theatrical release, Twist of Faith received a premiere screening at the publicly owned Maumee Indoor Theater in Toledo. The screening sold out, and the film received a standing ovation. However, the theater refused to screen the film after this initial showing despite considerable interest from the public. Comes, Dick, and a spokesperson for SNAP said they believed that the Toledo Diocese had pressured the theater to keep the film from playing in Toledo. A Maumee official denied this claim and said that the theater could not afford to screen the film. The film's distributor contested this claim and said that it had been willing to make any concession in order to screen the film in Comes' hometown.

== See also ==
- Roman Catholic sex abuse cases
- Deliver Us from Evil (2006 film)
- Holy Water-Gate (2004 documentary)
- Sex Crimes and the Vatican (Panorama Documentary Episode)
- Bad Education (Spanish: La mala educación) a 2004 film by Spanish director Pedro Almodóvar that deals with clerical sex abuse
