= Lisa A. Callif =

American lawyer

- Born: Lisa Anne Flate; January 6, 1974 (age 52); Los Angeles, California, U.S.
- Education: New York University, Southwestern Law School
- Occupations: Partner, Donaldson Callif Perez; Entertainment attorney Public speaker Author
- Spouse: Dustin Callif (2003-present)
- Website: www.donaldsoncallif.com

Lisa Anne Callif (born January 6, 1974) is an American entertainment attorney specializing in independent film. She works in all aspects of the field with a focus on clearance work – enabling filmmakers to use a limited amount of unlicensed material in their projects with the U.S. Copyright Law's fair use doctrine.

In 2008, Callif became a named partner at the Beverly Hills law firm Donaldson & Callif. She has worked on such documentary films as I'm Still Here, Waiting for Superman and Inside Job. Filmmakers she has worked with include: Oliver Stone, Jason Blum and Elise Pearlstein. She is an adjunct associate professor of law at Southwestern Law School in Los Angeles.

== As an author ==
In 2010, Callif released The American Bar Association's Legal Guide to Independent Film Making, which she co-authored with law partner Michael C. Donaldson, whose book Clearance & Copyright: Everything the Independent Filmmaker Needs to Know is used as a textbook in over 50 college and university film schools across America.

== Recognition ==
In 2011 Callif was named one of "The Best and the Brightest" of Hollywood Law by Variety magazine.

== Bibliography ==
- The American Bar Association's Legal Guide To Independent Filmmaking (2010) (by Lisa A. Callif & Michael C. Donaldson)
