= Not So Pretty =

- Genre: Documentary
- Directed by: Kirby Dick; Amy Ziering
- Country of origin: United States
- Original language: English
- No. of episodes: 4

Production
- Executive producers: Kirby Dick; Amy Ziering; Tara Long
- Producers: Alexandra Marske; Kat Nguyen
- Cinematography: Thaddeus Wadleigh
- Editors: Brian Giberson; Edward Patrick Alva
- Running time: 26-35 minutes
- Production companies: Jane Doe Films; Entertainment One

Original release
- Network: HBO Max
- Release: April 14, 2022

Not So Pretty is an American documentary television miniseries directed by Kirby Dick and Amy Ziering that explores the beauty industry and hidden chemicals in products. It consists of 4 episodes and premiered on April 14, 2022, on HBO Max.

== Premise ==
An investigative look into the beauty industry, looking into hidden chemicals in products.

== Episodes ==
No.	Title	Directed by	Original release date
1	"Makeup"	Kirby Dick & Amy Ziering	April 14, 2022
2	"Nails"	Kirby Dick & Amy Ziering	April 14, 2022
3	"Skin"	Kirby Dick & Amy Ziering	April 14, 2022
4	"Hair"	Kirby Dick & Amy Ziering	April 14, 2022

== Production ==
In September 2020, it was announced Kirby Dick and Amy Ziering would direct and executive produce a documentary-series revolving around the beauty industry, with Entertainment One set to produce, for HBO Max. In April 2022, it was announced Keke Palmer would serve as narrator.

== Reception ==
Angie Han of The Hollywood Reporter gave the series a positive review writing: "It’s valuable as the start of a larger conversation to be had about the hidden dangers of the beauty industry, for consumers and viewers alike." Joel Keller of Decider also gave the series a positive review writing: "Not So Pretty presents some pretty harrowing information in a tone that’s less hectoring and more sympathetic. By playing the, “hey, we didn’t know, either, buddy” card, its message is even more effective." Conversely, Kyndall Cunningham of The Daily Beast gave the series a negative review writing: "What you’re supposed to take away from the series as a consumer can be confusing and overwhelming at times."
