= Hard Candy (film) =

2005 American thriller film by David Slade

- Theatrical release poster
- Directed by: David Slade
- Written by: Brian Nelson
- Produced by: Rosanne Korenberg; Paul Allen
- Starring: Patrick Wilson; Elliot Page (Note: Credited as Ellen Page); Sandra Oh; Jennifer Holmes
- Cinematography: Jo Willems
- Edited by: Art Jones
- Music by: Molly Nyman; Harry Escott
- Production companies: Vulcan Productions; Launchpad Productions
- Distributed by: Lionsgate
- Release dates: January 21, 2005 (Sundance); April 14, 2006 (United States)
- Running time: 104 minutes
- Country: United States
- Language: English
- Budget: $950,000
- Box office: $8.3 million

Hard Candy is a 2005 American psychological thriller film focusing on a 14-year-old vigilante's trapping and torture of a man whom she suspects of being a sexual predator. The film was directed by David Slade, written by Brian Nelson, and stars Patrick Wilson and Elliot Page. It was the first feature film for Slade, who had primarily directed music videos.

Hard Candy premiered at the 2005 Sundance Film Festival, and was screened at the Florida Film Festival in April 2006. It had a limited release in two theaters in the United States. The film made over $8 million at the box office, including $1 million domestically, on a budget of under $1 million.

Hard Candy won three awards at the 2005 Sitges Film Festival, four awards at the Málaga Film Festival, and was also awarded Overlooked Film of the Year at the 2006 Phoenix Film Critics Society Awards. Page won Best Actress at the 2006 Austin Film Critics Association Awards.

== Plot ==
14-year-old Hayley Stark and 32-year-old photographer Jeff Kohlver engage in a sexually charged flirtatious online chat. They then meet at a coffeehouse before going to Jeff's home. When they arrive, Jeff makes them drinks, but Hayley refuses, saying she was taught to never take a drink she has not mixed herself, then goes to the kitchen and makes them both screwdrivers. Hayley asks Jeff to photograph her. He gets out his camera and Hayley begins to pose, but before Jeff can take any photos, he loses consciousness.

When Jeff comes to, he is bound to a desk chair. Hayley explains she has been tracking and baiting him through online chats, and drugged him because she believes he is a sexual predator. Jeff denies these allegations, claiming he had innocent intentions. Hayley searches Jeff's house and finds a gun, before soon finding a hidden safe containing sexually explicit photos of underage girls and a photo of Donna Mauer, a local girl who has been kidnapped and remains missing. Jeff kicks Hayley to the ground and attempts to retrieve his gun, but Hayley manages to sneak up behind him and wrap his face in plastic wrap, choking him unconscious.

When Jeff wakes up, he finds himself bound to a steel table with a bag of ice on his genitals. Hayley accuses Jeff of being involved in Donna's kidnapping, and tells him that she intends to castrate him. Undeterred by his pleading, Hayley consults a medical book to guide her through the procedure, describing it to Jeff as she operates. Once she is finished, she heads to the bathroom to take a shower. Jeff frees himself, only to realize that the "surgery" was staged and he is unharmed. Enraged, he picks up the scalpel and storms into the bathroom, but finds the running shower empty. Hayley attacks him from behind, and as they struggle, Hayley incapacitates him with a stun gun.

Hayley calls Jeff's ex-girlfriend Janelle, posing as a police officer and telling her to come to Jeff's house immediately. Jeff regains consciousness to find that Hayley has hoisted him to stand on a chair in his kitchen with a noose around his neck. She makes Jeff an offer – if he kills himself, she promises to erase the evidence of his crimes, but if he refuses, she will expose his secrets. After a disruption by the neighbor, Jeff manages to break free from his bindings and pursues Hayley through the house with a kitchen knife, eventually following her to the roof, where she has brought the gun, as well as her rope, fashioned into a noose secured to the chimney. Holding Jeff at gunpoint as he sees Janelle arrive, Hayley tells him that her offer is still open.

Jeff confesses that while he did not take part, he did watch while another man raped and murdered Donna, and that he "wanted to take pictures". Jeff promises Hayley that if she spares his life, he will tell her the other man's name so she can exact her revenge. Hayley reveals that she has already confronted the other man, who had also accused Jeff of being the perpetrator before killing himself, and that she does not care which one of them it actually was. Defeated, Jeff lets Hayley slide the noose around his neck and steps off the roof. After he falls, Hayley reveals that she had never planned to dispose of the evidence, then gathers her belongings and flees through the woods.

== Cast ==
- Patrick Wilson as Jeff Kohlver
- Elliot Page as Hayley Stark
- Sandra Oh as Judy Tokuda
- Odessa Rae (as Jennifer Holmes) as Janelle Rogers
- Gilbert John as Nighthawks Clerk

== Production ==
The idea for Hard Candy came from a news story producer David W. Higgins saw on 20/20 about young Japanese girls who would lure older businessmen to a location with the promise of meaningful conversation, only to assault and mug the men with a gang of other girls. This led him to wonder, "What if the person you expect to be the predator is not who you expect it to be? What if it's the other person?" He shared this question with writer Brian Nelson who worked out a treatment and then a script on spec, and then Higgins and Nelson approached David Slade to direct. Due to the controversial nature of the work, the budget was kept under $1 million so that the production company would not ask to change anything.

Very little dubbing was used in the film, with only a couple of lines modified in post-production. Only nine minutes of music are present in the film, with ambient sounds, such as heavy breathing, making up most of the soundtrack. The film was shot in 18 days, largely in sequence, and mostly on a soundstage. Hayley wears a red hooded sweatshirt that is often seen as an allusion to "Little Red Riding Hood". However, this was a serendipitous wardrobe choice by the creative team that was not realized until later on. International marketing for the film made use of this allusion. For example, a tagline on the Japanese site for the film reads: "Red Hood traps the Wolf in his own game."

Jean-Clement Soret was the digital colorist for the film, this being one of the few instances in which a colorist received a spot in the opening credits. The film contains many coloring effects and "density shifts" of lighting to reflect the moods of the characters. For example, when Hayley gets angry, the colors would be edited to be of lower frequency. One effect used which, as far as the director is aware, had not been done in cinema before, was to brighten the lighting in filming and correct everything down in post-production. This allowed for facial details to be visible even while having a darkened atmosphere. According to the DVD extras, the process required a custom-built digital intermediate to be made and proved to be extremely difficult, with corrections having to be made frame-by-frame in some instances. This technique, known as ETTR, is a standard procedure in digital photography and cinematography to minimize the amount of noise in shadows and midtones.

Nelson's early working titles of the script were Vendetta and Snip Snip. When Higgins asked for a title with a "sugar and spice combination and a mixture of harsh roughness, innocence, and vulnerability", Nelson proposed the title Hard Candy.

Elliot Page, in his memoir Pageboy, revealed that a member of the production gave him a ride home after the wrap party, and then sexually assaulted him.

== Reception ==
=== Box office ===
The film premiered at the 2005 Sundance Film Festival with a midnight screening. The Dolby Surround System failed before the screening and the audience was kept out until it was repaired. Hard Candy was also screened at the Florida Film Festival on April 1, 2006.

Hard Candy opened in two theaters in Los Angeles and New York City on April 14, 2006 in a limited release. During its opening weekend, the film grossed $58,049 averaging $29,704 per theater, the highest per-screen average in the top 50. Box Office Mojo reported that it ended its run with $1,024,640 at the North American box office, and a further $5,997,569 internationally for a total of $7,022,209. The Numbers put the total gross at $8.26 million, with an international gross of $7,242,426.

=== Critical response ===
On review aggregator Rotten Tomatoes, 67% of 147 critic reviews are positive, and the average rating is 6.4/10. The critics consensus reads: "Disturbing, controversial, but entirely engrossing, Hard Candy is well written with strong lead performances, especially that of newcomer [Elliot] Page. A movie that stays with the viewer long after leaving the theater." According to Metacritic, which sampled 30 reviews and calculated a weighted average score of 58 out of 100, the film received "mixed or average" reviews.

Roger Ebert rated the film 3.5/4 stars, writing "There is undeniable fascination in the situation as it unfolds... Seen as a film, seen as acting and direction, seen as just exactly how it unfolds on the screen, Hard Candy is impressive and effective." Steve Persall wrote in the Tampa Bay Times that he saw the movie in a crowded bar, yet "until the shocking end, there's nothing less than rapt attention to this sordid thriller about an online predator (Wilson) and his not-so-innocent prey [Elliot Page]. On a party night in New Orleans? That's how creepy-good this movie is." Steve Schneider, writing in the Orlando Weekly, praised the film's "grabber of a sicko setup... It's a memorably tense pas de deux, and if the movie doesn't pay off on it properly, fault a script that ventures further and further into psychological thriller claptrap, leaving the two stars to rely on their hefty talents to keep it at all believable."

Caroline Westbrook at Empire magazine called it a "cracking little thriller". David Edwards at the Daily Mirror praised it as a "smart, challenging and timely look at the world of internet grooming". Todd McCarthy at Variety praised the "spectacular performance" by the teenaged Page. On the other hand, Jonathan Rosenbaum referred to it as torture and mutilation and wrote: "I'd rather have this movie obliterated from my memory." The New York Times' film critic Manohla Dargis recognized the film's debt to "Ariel Dorfman and Neil LaBute, among others", but did not care for the torture theme "in the age of Abu Ghraib".

Page's performance received critical acclaim; Lynn Hirschberg of The New York Times Magazine said "a star was born, but almost no one noticed", describing Hard Candy as Page's initial artistic breakthrough performance, and his role in the 2007 film Juno as his mainstream popularity breakthrough performance. Claudia Puig from USA Today praised Page for "remain[ing] consistently convincing" to his role which is both "powerful and chilling ... [he] manages to be both cruelly callous and likable, and [he] is one of the most complex, disturbing and haunting performances of the year."

In 2015, Taste of Cinema ranked the film 17th among the "30 Great Psychopath Movies That Are Worth Your Time".

=== Accolades ===
The film won three awards at the 2005 Sitges Film Festival and four awards at the 2006 Málaga Film Festival. The film also won Overlooked Film of the Year at the 2006 Phoenix Film Critics Society Awards. Page (who was presenting as female at the time) won the Best Actress award from the Austin Film Critics Association. Page was nominated for the Breakthrough Performer award at the 2006 Online Film Critics Society Awards, and Best Female Newcomer at the 12th Empire Awards. The film was nominated for Best Foreign Independent film at the 2006 British Independent Film Awards, and the film's trailer was nominated for Best Thriller and Best Titles in a Trailer at the 7th Golden Trailer Awards.

Year	Event	Award	Nominee	Result
2006	Austin Film Critics Association Awards	Best Actress	Elliot Page	Won
2006	British Independent Film Awards	Best Foreign Independent Film	Hard Candy	Nominated
2007	Empire Awards	Best Female Newcomer	Elliot Page	Nominated
2006	Golden Trailer Awards	Best Thriller	Hard Candy trailer	Nominated
2006	Golden Trailer Awards	Best Titles in a Trailer	Hard Candy trailer	Nominated
2006	Málaga Film Festival	Best Film	Hard Candy	Won
2006	Málaga Film Festival	Best Director	David Slade	Won
2006	Málaga Film Festival	Best Actress	Elliot Page	Won
2006	Málaga Film Festival	Best Cinematography	Jo Willems	Won
2006	Online Film Critics Society Awards	Best Breakthrough Performance	Elliot Page	Nominated
2006	Phoenix Film Critics Society Awards	Overlooked Film of the Year	Hard Candy	Won
2005	Sitges Film Festival	Best Film	David Slade	Won
2005	Sitges Film Festival	Best Feature Film (Audience Award)	David Slade	Won
2005	Sitges Film Festival	Best Screenplay	Brian Nelson	Won

== Home media ==
The American DVD was released on September 19, 2006, with two commentary tracks, a 52-minute making-of featurette, six deleted and extended scenes, the script and director's notebook, and trailers for Hard Candy and other Lionsgate films. Francis Rizzo III from DVD Talk gave a positive review, praising the DVD's quality and extras. The Blu-ray was released by Lionsgate Home Entertainment on October 5, 2010, and contained the same special features as the DVD. Aaron Peck from High-Def Digest and Jeffrey Kauffman from Blu-ray.com both awarded the Blu-ray four out of five stars.

== See also ==
- List of films featuring psychopaths and sociopaths
- "Beim ersten Mal tut's immer weh"
