= Beim ersten Mal tut's immer weh =

Single by Oomph!

from the album Monster
- Released: 2008
- Recorded: 2007
- Genre: Neue Deutsche Härte, industrial metal
- Length: 3:58
- Label: GUN Records
- Songwriter(s): Rene Bachmann, De Crap, Stephan Musiol

Oomph! singles chronology
"Wach auf!" (2008)	"Beim ersten Mal tut's immer weh" (2008)	"Labyrinth" (2008)

"Beim ersten Mal tut's immer weh" (German for The first time always hurts) is a song by German industrial metal band Oomph!. It was released in 2008, as the second single from their album Monster. The song was used as a promo single for the album.

== Music video ==
The video is based on the controversial 2005 indie film Hard Candy. A censored version of the video was first released on 14 July 2008 through the video hosting service MyVideo. An uncensored version became available on the band's website via an online game ("Labyrinth") that promoted the release of the album Monster.

The video depicts a 15-year-old girl nicknamed Rotkäppchen (German: Little Red Riding Hood) being lured into a meeting with a pedophile. The two return to the pedophile's home, where the man sits on a chair and gets undressed, while the young girl starts to strip, then punches her assailant, knocking him unconscious. The young girl then ties the man down and gags him while torturing him with a butcher knife and other medical instruments, ultimately removing the man's testicles. Throughout the video, there are scenes depicting Oomph! performing the song.

== Promo track listing ==
1. Beim ersten Mal tut's immer weh ("The first time always hurts") - 3:58
