= Chelsea Does =

2016 American TV series

- Genre: Documentary
- Directed by: Eddie Schmidt
- Starring: Chelsea Handler
- Country of origin: United States
- Original language: English
- No. of seasons: 1
- No. of episodes: 4

Production
- Running time: 62–74 minutes

Original release
- Network: Netflix
- Release: January 23, 2016

Chelsea Does is an American television documentary series first released on Netflix on January 23, 2016. The episodes follow comedian Chelsea Handler as she explores different subjects. Most of the episodes include discussions between Handler and her friends (often fellow comedians), family, and psychologists about the topic at hand. Handler also travels for the show visiting destinations relevant to the topic.

== Episodes ==
=== Season 1 (2016) ===
| No. | Title | Directed by | Original release date |
|---|---|---|---|
| 1 | "Chelsea Does Marriage" | Eddie Schmidt | January 23, 2016 |
Handler talks with her family and friends (including Jason Biggs and Mary McCormack) about how her views on marriage have changed during her life and also interviews a number of married couples, professionals who work with marriage (e.g. wedding planners, marriage counselors, matchmakers), and kids about marriage.
| 2 | "Chelsea Does Silicon Valley" | Eddie Schmidt | January 23, 2016 |
Handler confronts her own issues with technology in a trip to Silicon Valley to pitch an app, code with kids, discuss the role of technology on modern life with friends (including Leah Remini and Khloé Kardashian), and dissect tech's effects on our brains. She also talks with Netflix CEO Reed Hastings and other people who work in Silicon Valley.
| 3 | "Chelsea Does Racism" | Eddie Schmidt | January 23, 2016 |
Handler talks with fellow comedians (including Margaret Cho, Aasif Mandvi, and Michael McDonald) about racism and racial humor in the United States, visits a former plantation, and explores some of Los Angeles' ethnic neighborhoods with Loni Love. She speaks with Al Sharpton to talk about race and race relations, and meets with a group of people representing several civil rights organizations to talk about the boundaries of racial humor. She also speaks with Matthew Heimbach about the rise of white-nationalism.
| 4 | "Chelsea Does Drugs" | Eddie Schmidt | January 23, 2016 |
Handler has an edible pot dinner with a group of fellow comedians (including Josh Wolf and Fortune Feimster), talks to former drug addicts about their experiences, and experiments with Adderall and Ambien under the supervision of her friend who studies neuroscience. She then travels with two of her friends to Peru to try ayahuasca.
