= Derrida (film) =

- Directed by: Kirby Dick; Amy Ziering Kofman
- Produced by: Amy Ziering Kofman
- Cinematography: Kirsten Johnson
- Edited by: Kirby Dick; Matthew Clarke
- Music by: Ryuichi Sakamoto and Robert Miles
- Production company: Jane Doe Films
- Distributed by: Zeitgeist Films
- Release dates: January 2002 (Sundance Film Festival); October 23, 2002 (U.S.)
- Running time: 85 minutes
- Country: United States
- Languages: English; French

Derrida is a 2002 American documentary film directed by Kirby Dick and Amy Ziering Kofman about the French philosopher Jacques Derrida. It premiered at the 2002 Sundance Film Festival before being released theatrically on October 23, 2002.

== Synopsis ==
The film uses interviews shot by the filmmakers, footage of Derrida's lectures and speaking engagements, and personal footage of Derrida at home with his friends and family. In several scenes, Ziering Kofman also reads excerpts from Derrida's work or otherwise describes aspects of his life.

Derrida also focuses on Derrida's thesis that scholars tend to ignore important biographical information when discussing philosophers' lives. In one scene, Derrida comments that he would be most interested in hearing about famous philosophers' sex lives because this topic is seldom addressed in their writings. The filmmakers respond to many of these criticisms by probing Derrida on various aspects of his own personal life, though he usually refuses to answer directly questions about himself.

The film also follows Derrida during a trip to South Africa where he visits Nelson Mandela's former prison cell and discusses forgiveness with university students. Derrida states that his own childhood experiences with anti-Semitism have heightened his sensitivity to racial issues.

== Analysis ==
At several points, Derrida shows the philosopher applying his theory of deconstruction to the film itself. Derrida often challenges the filmmaking process and argues against the capability of any film to portray him accurately. The film also includes metacinematic scenes in which Derrida analyzes previously recorded footage of himself. In one such scene, Derrida telescopically watches a video of himself analyzing footage of himself.

Nicholas Royle argues that the film's labyrinthine, Ouroboros-like structure reinforces several key Derridean tenets:

"If Dick and Ziering Kofman follow Derrida, Derrida is also following them. Derrida is a film about following, about the compulsiveness and ghostliness of following, of following the camera, of following the story, of following a film. But Derrida is also a film about the impossibility of following, about the consequences and effects of Derrida's work vis-à-vis the 'story of a life', about the idea that Derrida cannot tell a story."

== Reception ==
Film critics generally gave Derrida positive reviews. On the review aggregator website Rotten Tomatoes, 82% of 34 critics' reviews are positive. The website's consensus reads: "Derrida's intelligence and engaging personality make him an intriguing documentary subject." Metacritic, which uses a weighted average, assigned the film a score of 73 out of 100, based on 17 critics, indicating "generally favorable" reviews. Kenneth Turan of the Los Angeles Times praised the film for its sophisticated style and said it was "the cinematic equivalent of a mind-expanding drug" while Film Threat's Tim Merrill described it as "a priceless historical record." Other critics, like The Guardian's Peter Bradshaw, found the film whimsical and entertaining but lamented Derrida's evasive and mysterious demeanor.

Derrida received the Golden Gate Award at the 2002 San Francisco Film Festival and screened in competition for the Grand Jury Prize at the 2002 Sundance Film Festival.

== Post-Release ==
Derrida enjoyed the film and appeared at several promotional events to discuss the film and answer questions about the project.

Derrida died in October 2004.

In 2005, Routledge published a companion book, Derrida, which includes the film's screenplay, several essays on the film, and interviews with Derrida, Dick, and Ziering Kofman. The book describes many of the events that followed the film's release, including Derrida's unexpected celebrity status on the streets of New York City. This phenomenon prompted Derrida's wife to remark to the filmmakers, "I hear you've made him into Clint Eastwood."

== See also ==
- D'ailleurs, Derrida
