= Blake Leyh =

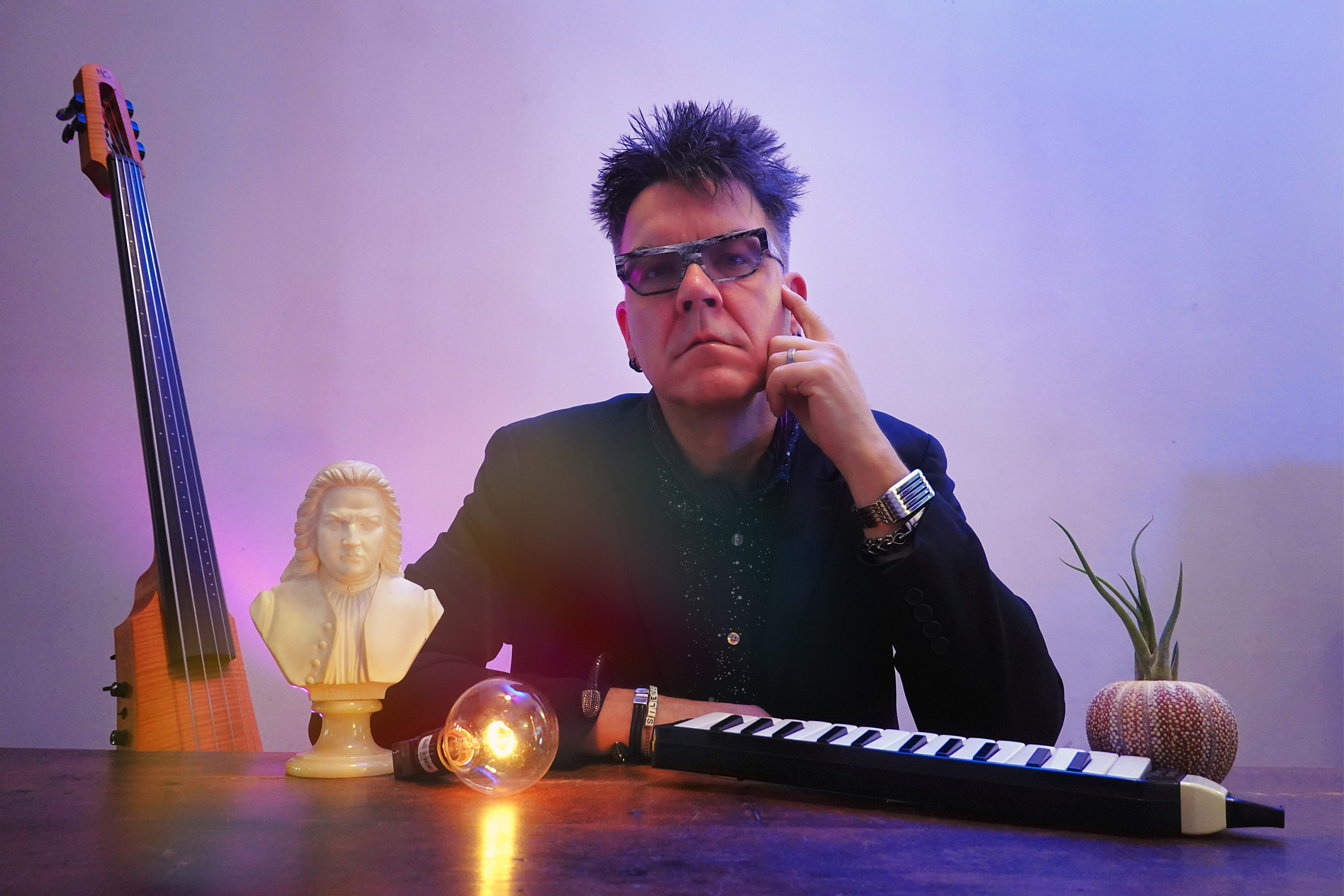
- Leyh in 2020

Background information
- Born: December 18, 1962 (age 62); Syracuse, New York, U.S.
- Genres: Soundtrack; electronic; avant-garde
- Occupations: Composer; Sound Designer; Music Supervisor; Mixer
- Instruments: Guitar; Bass; Electric Cello; Gravikord
- Years active: 1980–present
- Spouse: Leslie Asako Gladsjø (m. 2002)
- Website: blakeleyh.com

Blake Leyh (born in Syracuse, New York in 1962) is a composer, sound designer, and music supervisor.

Leyh's prominent credits include music supervising HBO's television show The Wire, most notably the end theme called "The Fall" written by Leyh especially for the show and composing original scores for the films of Kirby Dick (including the Oscar-nominated Twist of Faith and SICK: The Life & Death of Bob Flanagan, Supermasochist) and sound design for the films of Julie Taymor, Ang Lee, Spike Lee, John Waters, and James Cameron. He has also released several CDs of original music, and was employed as a composer and sound designer at Beatnik during the late 90s.

He wrote the scores for the award-winning documentary Pray the Devil Back to Hell and Killing Kasztner Leyh lives in Harlem, New York City.

== Awards ==
- In 1990 Leyh won a Golden Reel Award for Best Sound Editing on The Abyss.
- In 1992 Leyh won a Golden Reel Award for Best Sound Editing on Barton Fink.
- In 2010 Leyh was nominated for a Grammy Award for his role as producer on the Treme soundtrack album
- In 2014 Leyh won an Emmy Award for his role as music mixer on the HBO television series Treme
