= Michael C. Donaldson =

American entertainment attorney and independent film advocate

- Born: Michael Cleaves Donaldson; October 13, 1939 (age 87); Montclair, New Jersey, U.S.
- Occupations: Founder, Donaldson & Callif; Entertainment attorney Public speaker Author

Michael C. Donaldson (born October 13, 1939) is an American entertainment attorney, independent film advocate and a recipient of the International Documentary Association's Amicus Award, an honor bestowed upon only two others, Steven Spielberg and John Hendricks, in the 25-year history of the awards. He is a proponent of the 165-year-old fair-use doctrine and, through its use, is known for saving documentarians hundreds of thousands of dollars while preserving their First Amendment rights.

In addition to serving as general counsel to Film Independent (home of the Independent Spirit Awards and the Los Angeles Film Festival) and the Writers Guild of America/West Foundation, Donaldson practices at his Beverly Hills law firm, Donaldson Callif Perez LLP where, in 2008, entertainment attorney Lisa A. Callif became a partner, and Chris Perez was named partner in 2021.

== United States v. Stevens ==
Donaldson played a significant part in the Supreme Court of the United States’ United States v. Stevens case by arranging the amicus brief that was filed by four documentary film organizations the members of which were directly affected by the Supreme Court's decision – the International Documentary Association, Film Independent, the Independent Feature Project, and the Independent Film & Television Alliance.

The amicus brief was filed on behalf of a documentary filmmaker who made a film about the history of pit bulls and included a clip of dog fights in Japan, where dog fighting is legal. Filmmaker Robert Stevens was sentenced to three years in prison for violating a federal statute that criminalizes the depiction of cruelty to animals in film. Through this brief the organizations urged the court to rule in favor of Stevens because of the case's First Amendment implications.

On April 20, 2010, the United States Supreme Court ruled 8–1 in favor of voiding a 1999 animal cruelty law in favor of free speech protections guaranteed by the First Amendment to the United States Constitution.

== Chevron v. Joe Berlinger ==
Donaldson prepared an amicus brief in support of filmmaker Joe Berlinger, who was ordered to hand over some 600 hours of raw footage shot in connection with his documentary Crude. Chevron Corporation requested the footage, intending to use it to defend itself in an Ecuadorian class-action lawsuit (filed against it for environmental contamination to the Amazon rainforest) as well as to help fend off the threatened criminal prosecution of two of its attorneys in the litigation.

The brief was prepared pro bono by Donaldson's firm and filed in an effort to protect against the potentially devastating consequences the subpoena could have on the role documentary filmmakers play in providing independent information on human rights and social issues through their use of the First Amendment right known as Reporters' Privilege. A number of industry organizations and individuals signed on to the brief, including Film Independent, IFP Inc., Alex Gibney, and Eddie Schmidt, who was president of the International Documentary Association.

Actor, director, and environmental activist Robert Redford, has made his thoughts on the issue known in public media platforms.

== Digital Millennium Copyright Act ==
On July 26, 2010, the United States Copyright Office ruled that documentary filmmakers would be exempt from the provisions of the DMCA (Digital Millennium Copyright Act of 1998) that criminalize the act of circumventing electronic and digital copyright protection systems when ripping material from DVDs. The exemption was the result of an action spearheaded by Donaldson who assembled a coalition of award-winning documentarians and filmmaker organizations and provided pro bono legal council for the legal request.

Prior to the ruling, documentary filmmakers were forced to use technically inferior methods to obtain copyrighted material permitted them by the fair use doctrine in United States copyright law. The exemption allows documentarians to legally obtain portions of encrypted or digitally locked material from DVDs for non-infringing use in their films.

The exemption was in effect through October 28, 2012. On October 26, 2012, the Librarian of Congress published a new set of exemptions, effective October 28, 2001 through October 28, 2015, that provide substantially the same filmmaker rights.

== Net neutrality ==
Donaldson assisted in the effort to ensure that documentary filmmakers have the same rights as major studios in terms of the speed at which their films will be able to travel the internet. He, along with Jack I. Lerner and the USC Intellectual Property and Technology Law Clinic, organized the efforts on a pro-bono bases in support of the principle termed Net Neutrality. The fight was led by the International Documentary Association and was supported by such additional organizations as Film Independent, University Film & Video Association, Independent Filmmaker Project, Independent Feature Project Chicago, IFP Minnesota and National Alliance for Media Arts and Culture.

On January 2, 2011, the FCC ruled in favor of net neutrality in a 3-to-2 vote.

== Lee & William Storey v. Commissioner of Internal Revenue ==
In support of the documentary film community's tax status, Donaldson, along with his firm's team of attorneys, prepared an amicus brief on a pro-bono basis urging the United States Tax Court to recognize that documentary films are overwhelmingly undertaken in the pursuit of a profit. It was filed in response to the Internal Revenue Service's challenge of filmmaker Lee Storey's business expenses associated with his documentary Smile ‘Til It Hurts: The Up With People Story.

During Storey's March 2011 trial, a judge expressed an inclination to hold that documentaries are intended to “educate and expose” rather than make a profit.

If documentary filmmaking were to be viewed by the IRS as merely a means to persuade or entertain – and not intended to turn a profit – documentarians would no longer be able to claim deductions incurred in the production of such films.

On Thursday, April 19, 2012, U.S. Tax Court Judge Diane L. Kroupa recognized documentary filmmaking as a legitimate business and ruled that Storey can write off the entirety of her filmmaking losses, which were in the amount of hundreds of thousands of dollars.

== Judge Learned Hand ==
On May 5, 2013, Los Angeles Review of Books – an online literary review journal that covers the American and international book scene – published Donaldson's review of the book Reason and Imagination: the Selected Correspondence of Learned Hand, a collection of Judge Learned Hand's personal letters. Aside from a few members of the US Supreme Court, Hand is the most-quoted judge in American history. In his extensive, 2700-word review, Donaldson describes the book as "a sweeping retelling of American history from one of its most intelligent, dispassionate participants."

== Escape from Tomorrow ==
Donaldson was the key proponent in assuring the film Escape from Tomorrow fell under the fair-use doctrine and was insurable.

Escape from Tomorrow premiered at the Sundance Film Festival in January 2013. The film was shot entirely guerilla-style at Disney World and Disneyland without obtaining permission from the parks. The issue with getting the movie insured was not merely that it was shot secretly inside the parks, but that the movie is a parody of Disney that portrays a “darker” side, which goes against the company brand.

In order to get the movie insured, Donaldson issued an opinion letter to the insurance company presenting a case for fair use, trademark, public domain, and access issues. The opinion letter was the longest that his office had ever written; it took 4 months to assemble. The E&O insurance policy was issued in the standard time of one week. The film was released to theaters and video on October 11, 2013.

== The Central Park Five ==
Donaldson worked alongside New York attorney Andrew Cielli to prepare and file an amicus brief on behalf of documentary filmmakers Ken Burns, Sarah Burns, and David McMahon, who produced the documentary The Central Park Five. The brief was supported by the International Documentary Association, NAMAC, and Film Independent.

The Central Park Five chronicles the story of five men wrongfully accused of raping a Central Park jogger in 1989. They were later exonerated after another man confessed and provided DNA evidence. Eight years later the wrongfully accused filed a 50 million dollar lawsuit against the state of New York, claiming their confessions were coerced and their case was mishandled. In its defense, the state of New York attempted to obtain outtakes from the film, claiming the documentarians forfeited their journalistic privilege because they advocated on behalf of the subjects of the documentary.

Donaldson fought for the filmmakers, arguing that preservation of journalistic privilege is essential in order for documentarians’ work to be effective, despite how the story was discovered or how passionately they advocate for their subjects. On February 19, 2013, U.S. Magistrate Judge Ronald L. Ellis ruled in favor of the documentary filmmakers preserving their journalistic privilege.

== Orphan works legislation ==
On April 2, 2014, Donaldson testified before the House Judiciary Committee in Washington, DC on behalf of the Independent Documentary Association and Film Independent on the subject of orphan works. Orphan words are copyrighted works whose owners cannot be contacted or found despite a diligent search. Donaldson's testimony urged Congress to consider documentary and independent filmmakers when crafting new legislation on orphan works since, under current law, filmmakers are at risk of being hit with huge damages when using unlicensed material, no matter how diligent a search for the owners.

== As an author ==
Donaldson's Clearance & Copyright: Everything the Independent Filmmaker Needs to Know is used as a textbook in over 50 college and university film schools across America. He is also the author of Negotiating for Dummies, which has been translated into 9 languages, as well as Do It Yourself! Trademarks & Copyrights and Fearless Negotiating: The Wish, Want, Walk Method To Reaching Agreements That Work. In 2010, Donaldson released The American Bar Association's Legal Guide To Independent Filmmaking, which he co-authored with his partner Lisa A. Callif.

== Recognition ==
Donaldson was honored with the International Documentary Association's Amicus Award in 2009. He was included in The Hollywood Reporter's "Power Lawyers" list in 2010 and 2011. In 2012 he was included in Variety's Legal Impact Report 2012: Game-Changing Attorneys. And he was selected as a Super Lawyer in 2009, 2012 and 2013.

== Bibliography ==
- The E-Z Legal Guide to Trademarks & Copyrights (1995)
- Do It Yourself! Trademarks & Copyrights (1995)
- Clearance & Copyright: Everything the Independent Filmmaker Needs to Know (1996)
- Negotiating for Dummies (1996)
- Negotiating for Dummies 2nd Edition (2007)
- Fearless Negotiating: The Wish, Want, Walk Method To Reaching Agreements That Work (2007)
- Clearance & Copyright: Everything You Need to Know for Film and Television (2008)
- The American Bar Association's Legal Guide To Independent Filmmaking (2010) (by Michael C. Donaldson & Lisa A. Callif)
