= Private Practices (book) =

Book by Naoko Wake

Private practices
- Cover
- Author: Naoko Wake
- Original title: Private practices : Harry Stack Sullivan, the science of homosexuality, and American liberalism
- Language: English
- Subject: History of medicine, American gay psychiatrists, liberalism in 20th century America
- Genre: Non-fiction
- Publisher: Rutgers University Press
- Publication date: March 9, 2011
- Publication place: United States
- Pages: 263
- ISBN: 978-0813549583

Private practices : Harry Stack Sullivan, the science of homosexuality, and American liberalism is a 2011 book by U.S. based-Japanese historian, author, and academic Naoko Wake published by Rutgers University Press. The book explores the interplay of science, sexuality, gender, race, and culture in 1920-1950 America, focusing on Harry Stack Sullivan, a neo-Freudian psychiatrist. The book reveals contradictions among liberal intellectuals that influenced the rise of American conservatism. Wake delves into scientists' conflicted perspectives on homosexuality, highlighting a gap between their public stance (viewing it as a "disease") and private beliefs (questioning such a stigmatizing view). This disparity reflects a modern culture valuing self-awareness and open-mindedness as markers of mature gender and sexual identities. The book underscores the limits of the scientific approach to subjectivity, emphasizing its impact on shaping sexual subjectivity in American culture.

== Overview ==
The book consists of an introduction and six chapters exploring both the public and private lives of influential psychiatrist Harry Stack Sullivan as a homosexual man. Wake examines Sullivan's evolving views on homosexuality and mental health, spanning from his 1920s practice in Baltimore to post-WWII involvement with UNESCO and WHO. Wake shows the evolution of attitudes towards homosexuality in the early to mid-20th century, focusing on Sullivan and his contemporary social scientists including Ruth Fulton Benedict, Margaret Mead, and Edward Sapir.

The book highlights the growing gap between liberal scientists' public and private beliefs, leading to a political backlash against the LGBTQ+ community postwar. Sullivan's unconventional approach at Sheppard and Enoch Pratt Hospital encouraging same-sex affection, is examined through archival records, shedding light on the complexities of his own homosexuality.

At Sheppard and Enoch Pratt Hospital Sullivan treated young men with schizophrenia, many diagnosed with homosexual conflicts. Sullivan's innovative approach included a ward with gay attendants to create a more accepting environment.

Wake further examines Sullivan's role in the development of social psychology, particularly his interpersonal theory and views on homosexuality.

By delving into Sullivan's private life, Wake explores his homosexuality as a key but overlooked aspect of his work. She studies Sullivan's complex views on sexuality and how his attitudes evolved under societal pressures, leading to his involvement in the Selective Service screening during WWII.

== Critical reception ==
Miriam Reumann (Note: From the University of Rhode Island) said the book offers a complex portrait, exploring Sullivan's relationships, clinical practices, and contributions to midcentury sexuality studies.

Carolyn Herbst Lewis (Note: From the Louisiana State University) praised Wake's meticulous research and intelligent analysis of patient records, highlighting the book's contributions to the history of science, psychiatry, homophobia, racism, and the emergence of sexual citizenship in the mid-20th century.

Aaron Potenza (Note: From Yale University) praised Wake's detailed archival work, calling the book well-written and ambitious, offering valuable insights into the development of social scientific thought on homosexuality.

In their review, HG Cocks (Note: From the University of Nottingham) highlights Sullivan's attempt to understand homosexuality within a social psychology framework, emphasizing societal reactions rather than inherent problems. The review acknowledges the limitations of Sullivan's approach, criticizing the separation of private and public lives among liberal scientists, yet recognizing the challenging circumstances for a broader societal challenge to homophobia. Despite Sullivan's efforts, the review notes that the flood of homophobic psychiatry in the 1950s and 1960s ultimately overshadowed his contributions.

In his review, Edward G. K. Gitre (Note: From the Institute for Advanced Studies in Culture, University of Virginia) criticizes it for not clearly defining the term "liberalism" in the context of Harry Stack Sullivan's views on homosexuality. The reviewer questions the book's focus on Sullivan's private life and homosexuality, suggesting that it falls short of being a comprehensive interdisciplinary history or intellectual biography.

In his review, Peter Hegarty (Note: From The Open University) wrote: "Wake is critical of Sullivan for failing to engage with the racism of a military screening system that excluded a greater proportion of African-Americans than Whites from military service, but she also recognizes that Sullivan leaned toward excluding individual men to protect them from military service. She locates Sullivan’s post-war work with UNESCO as part of a pattern of “paternalistic liberalism” toward those countries that were defeated in World War II, including her own native Japan."

A section of Private Practices was adopted as an opening chapter of Culture, Politics and Race in the Making of Interpersonal Psychoanalysis: Breaking Boundaries. (Note: Winner of the 2023 American Board & Academy of Psychoanalysis Book Prize.) In the Introduction, the editors Roger Frie and Pascal Sauvayer reflect on the development of sociocultural understanding of psychiatry and acknowledge Private Practices as “the pathbreaking intellectual biography of Harry Stack Sullivan (2011).”

=== Wake's response to Gitre ===
The Journal of the History of the Behavioral Sciences invited Wake to write a response to Gitre's review. In her response, she wrote:

"Private Practices may not be an intellectual biography if such a biography must contain a full roster of intellectual giants. But, as I see it, Sullivan’s life and American liberalism were more diverse and messier, arising from all sorts of interpersonal relationships, including doctor–patient relationships as well as interdisciplinary collaborations. In this light, it is far from “impractical” to explore the science of homosexuality and its place in liberalism; indeed, there are surprisingly rich sources, and I look forward to seeing more scholars take advantage of them to understand liberalism in its different shades and spheres."
