= James M. Wall =

American Methodist minister and journalist (1928–2021)

The Reverend James M. Wall
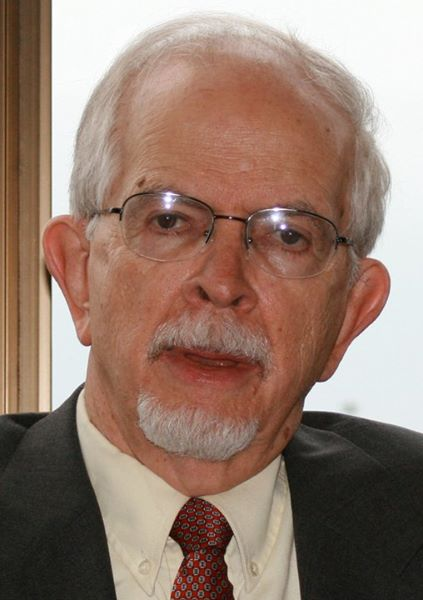
- Wall in 2017
- Born: James McKendree Wall; October 27, 1928; Monroe, Georgia, US
- Died: March 22, 2021 (aged 92); Elmhurst, Illinois, US
- Education: Emory University; University of Chicago
- Occupations: Methodist minister; journalist
- Office: Editor of The Christian Century (1972–1999)
- Political party: Democratic Party
- Spouse: Mary Eleanor (m. 1953)

Ecclesiastical career
- Religion: Christianity (Methodist)
- Church: United Methodist Church
- Ordained: 1955
- Website: wallwritings.me

James McKendree Wall (27 October 1928 – 22 March 2021) was an American Methodist minister and journalist who wrote extensively on religion in the United States.

== Life and career ==
Wall was born on October 27, 1928, in Monroe, Georgia. He received an undergraduate degree in journalism and a Master of Divinity degree from Emory University, as well as a Master of Arts degree from the University of Chicago. He was ordained as a minister in the United Methodist Church in 1955.

He edited the United Methodists' Christian Advocate from 1962 to 1972. Time wrote that "Wall brought to that journal a bright streak of professionalism while indulging his affection for writing; he was his own film critic."

Subsequently, he served as editor and publisher of The Christian Century in Chicago from 1972 through February 1999. The Century was considered the flagship magazine of US mainline Protestantism. From 1999 through 2008, he wrote a column for The Christian Century, while serving as senior contributing editor. He was a contributing editor from 2008 until July 2017 when his name was removed from the Century's print masthead. According to Newsweek, Wall began his Century editorship by resolving a financial crisis and shifting the focus: "I see the Century as the midwife of ideas and issues. We're less interested in being programmatic than in reporting the world from a religious perspective", he said. He began a blog on April 24, 2008.

In its obituary for Wall, The Christian Century noted "his ecumenical interests, his stabilization of the magazine's financial picture, and his encouragement of some new directions for the Century's pages" as well as Wall's love for politics and "extensive pro-Palestinian writing [that] at times devolved into anti-Semitism".

Wall died on March 22, 2021, in Elmhurst, Illinois.

=== Film rating ===
During his Century editorship, Wall had a significant role in developing the Motion Picture Association of America film rating system. According to William D. Romanowski, he came to the attention of the film industry after defending the value of such films as The Graduate, Bonnie and Clyde, and The Pawnbroker. His July 1968 speech to the National Association of Theatre Owners had a "profound effect" on theater executives, "raising the prospects of vastly improved lines of communication between organized exhibition and religious organizations".

After serving several terms as chair of the National Council of Churches's Film and Industry Committee, in 1994 Wall was named Special Consultant, Relations with the Motion Picture Industry, for the National Council of Churches, and was the organization's representative to the appeals board of the ratings board of the Motion Picture Association of America and the National Association of Theatre Owners.

=== Advisory positions ===
Wall served as a member of a bioethics policy task force for the National Aeronautics and Space Administration from 1994 to early 1996. He also served on a special committee of the National Academy of Sciences that, at the request of the Centers for Disease Control and Prevention, monitored dose reconstruction studies at nuclear weapons processing sites, was a member of the Program Review Committee for Battelle Memorial Institute, which monitored a program that identified a permanent location for the nation's high-level nuclear waste disposal site, and was a member of a special committee of the National Academy of Science that produced a 1988 report on the use of animals in biomedical research.

=== Democratic Party ===
Wall was active in the Democratic Party, serving in a variety of roles. He was chair of the Jimmy Carter presidential primary and general election campaigns in Illinois in 1976 and 1980 and a delegate for Carter at the 1976 and 1980 Democratic National Nominating Conventions. He served a term on the Democratic National Committee and was an unsuccessful candidate for the House of Representatives in 1972. Also that year, Wall was an organizer and chair of George McGovern's Illinois delegates to the Democratic National Nominating Convention. In 1983-84, Wall took a six-month leave from The Christian Century to manage Congressman Paul Simon's successful primary campaign for a US Senate seat from Illinois. Wall worked for Democratic candidates with whom he disagreed on significant issues, but as a 1992 article in the Chicago Reader noted: "What Wall learned 20 years ago is that politics is about power, not perfection. A president with whom you agree 70 percent of the time is better than a candidate with whom you agree 100 percent—and who loses to somebody with whom you agree only 10 percent of the time."

== Awards and honors ==
He was Alumnus of the Year in 2001 at the Divinity School of the University of Chicago.

He was awarded honorary degrees by Emory University, Elmhurst College, MacMurray College, Willamette University, Coe College, and Ohio Northern University.

In an introduction to two lectures delivered at Princeton University in 2000, Wall's work combining religion and contemporary culture was described by Princeton's Amy Scott Vaughn,

"James M. Wall invites us to join a search for grace in the practices of everyday life. He examines the secularity that stands as a barrier to finding God’s grace and then considers avenues to finding God’s grace within that very secularity. Our society, says Wall, is dominated by people and institutions that want to keep the sacred from being an essential part of our private and public lives. Wall challenges us to lead youth out of the secular mind-‐set and into a larger space where God will find us with a redemptive word of grace".

== Works ==
=== Books ===
- Church and Cinema. A Way of Viewing Film. Grand Rapids, MI: William B. Eerdmans, 1971.
- Winning the War: Losing Our Souls. Christian Century Foundation, 1991.
- Hidden Treasures, Searching for God in Modern Culture. Christian Century Foundation, 1997.

=== Book chapters ===
- "Biblical Spectaculars and Secular Man," in Celluloid and Symbols, edited by John C. Cooper and Donald Messer. Cleveland, OH: The Pilgrim Press, 1972.
- "François Truffaut," in Three European Directors: Truffaut, Fellini, Bunuel, edited by James M. Wall. Grand Rapids, MI: William B. Eerdmans, 1973.
- "Integration and Imperialism: The Century 1953-1961" and "Adopting Realism: The Century 1961-1971", in A Century of the Century, edited by Linda-Marie Dellhoff, Martin E. Marty, Dean Peerman, and James M. Wall. Grand Rapids, MI: William B. Eerdmans, 1987.
- "2001: A Space Odyssey and the Search for a Center," in Image and Likeness: Religious Visions in American Film Classics, edited by John R. May. Mahwah, NJ: Paulist Press, 1992.
- "Searching for Grace in the Stuffness of the Secular" and "Overcoming Secular Barriers to God's Grace", in Life Together: Practicing Faith with Adolescents. Princeton, NJ: Institute for Youth Ministries, Princeton Theological Seminary, 2001.
- "Happily Uncharted," in Connected Spirits: Friends and Spiritual Journeys, edited by Andrew J. Weaver and Donald Messer. Cleveland, OH: The Pilgrim Press, 2007.

==== As editor ====
- Theologians in Transition: The Christian Century "How My Mind Has Changed" Series. Crossroad Publishing Company, 1981.

== Bibliography ==
- Contemporary Authors. Detroit, MI: Gale Research Co. 1971.
- Hart, Gary Warren (1971). Right from the Start: A Chronicle of the McGovern Campaign. New York: Quadrangle/The New York Times Publishing Company. ISBN 978-0812903720.
- Romanowski, William D. (2012). Reforming Hollywood: How American Protestants Fought for Freedom at the Movies. New York: Oxford University Press. ISBN 978-0195387841.
- Hartley, Robert E. (2012). Paul Simon: The Political Journey of an Illinois Original. Carbondale, IL: Southern Illinois University Press. ISBN 978-0809329458.
- Lee, Phillip (2017). "A Road Movie from Georgia to Palestine and Home Again: Interview with James M. Wall". Media Development. LXIV (3): 21–27.
- Schram, Martin (1976). Running for President: A Journal of the Carter Campaign. New York: Pocketbooks. ISBN 978-0812903720.
