= Kirby Dick =

American film director, producer, and screenwriter

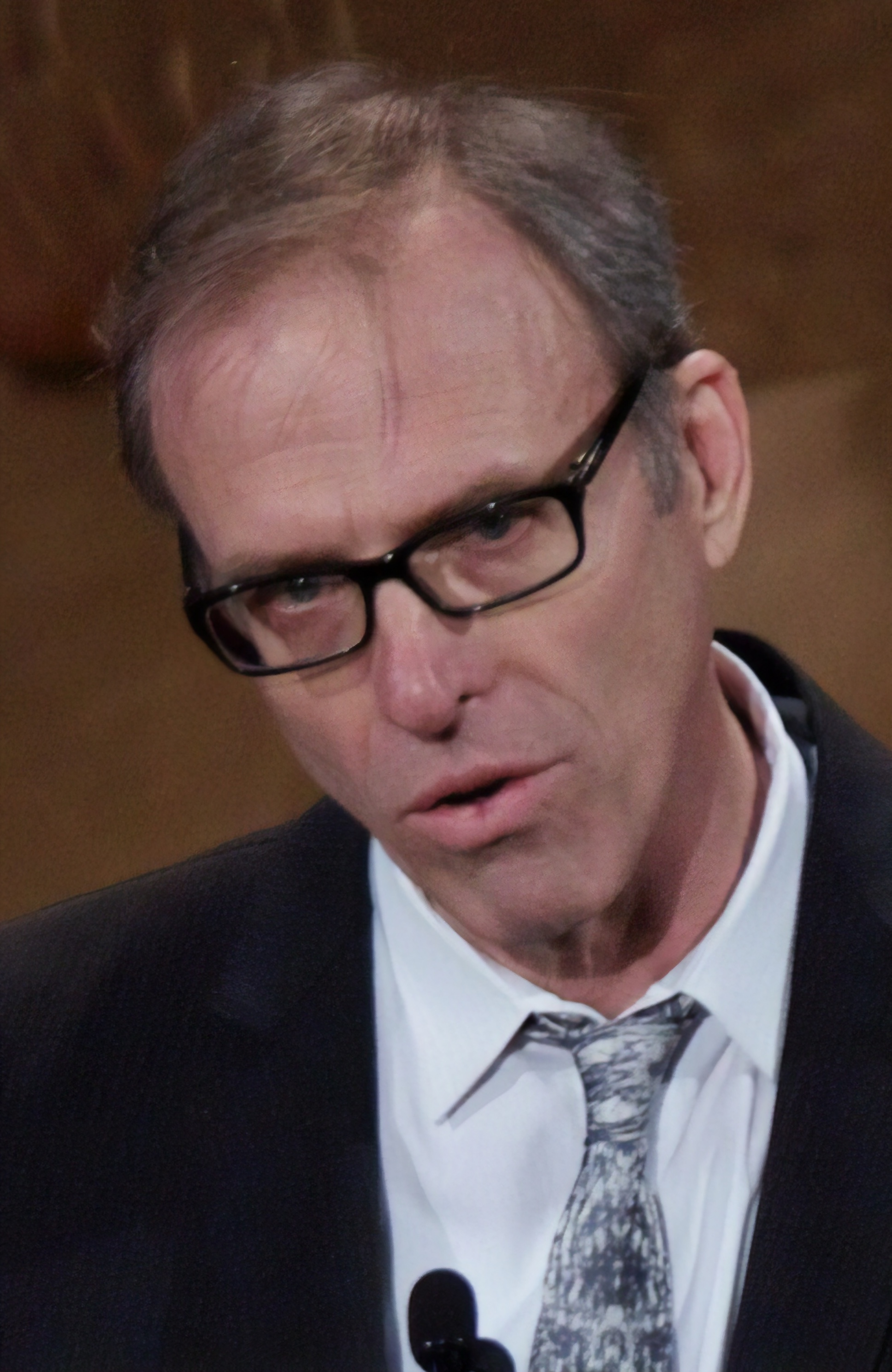
- Dick at the 2014 Peabody Awards
- Born: Kirby Bryan Dick; August 23, 1952 (age 74); Phoenix, Arizona, U.S.
- Education: Nova Scotia College of Art and Design University; California Institute of Arts (BFA); American Film Institute (MFA)
- Occupations: Director, producer, screenwriter, editor
- Years active: 1981–present
- Spouse: Rita Valencia (1985–present)
- Website: kirbydick.com

Kirby Bryan Dick (born August 23, 1952) is an American film director, producer, screenwriter, and editor best known for directing documentary films. He received Academy Award nominations for Best Documentary Feature for directing Twist of Faith (2005) and The Invisible War (2012). He has also received numerous awards from film festivals, including the Sundance Film Festival and Los Angeles Film Festival.

== Life and career ==
Dick was born in Phoenix, Arizona. He studied at Nova Scotia College of Art and Design, California Institute of the Arts, and the AFI Conservatory. His first documentary feature, Private Practices: The Story of a Sex Surrogate (1986), enjoyed a successful festival run.

Dick spent the following decade pursuing a variety of projects while working on Sick: The Life and Death of Bob Flanagan, Supermasochist (1997). Sick examined the life of performance artist Bob Flanagan, who utilized sadomasochism as a therapeutic device to help cope with cystic fibrosis and agreed to participate in the documentary only if his eventual death was included. The film was an international festival hit, winning a Special Jury Prize at the 1997 Sundance Film Festival and helping to establish Dick's position in the world of independent filmmaking.

His next film, Chain Camera (2001), was made entirely with footage shot on consumer digital video cameras by students at John Marshall High School, near Dick's home in Los Angeles. The film premiered at the 2001 Sundance Film Festival. Dick followed up this project with Derrida (2002), which he co-directed with Amy Ziering. The film explores the life and work of French philosopher Jacques Derrida while questioning the limitations of biography. It won the Golden Gate Award at the 2002 San Francisco International Film Festival.

Dick's next project, Twist of Faith (2005), followed a man who decides to speak out about his childhood sexual abuse by a Catholic priest. Released during the midst of the Catholic sex abuse scandal, the film garnered widespread attention and was nominated for an Academy Award for Best Documentary Feature.

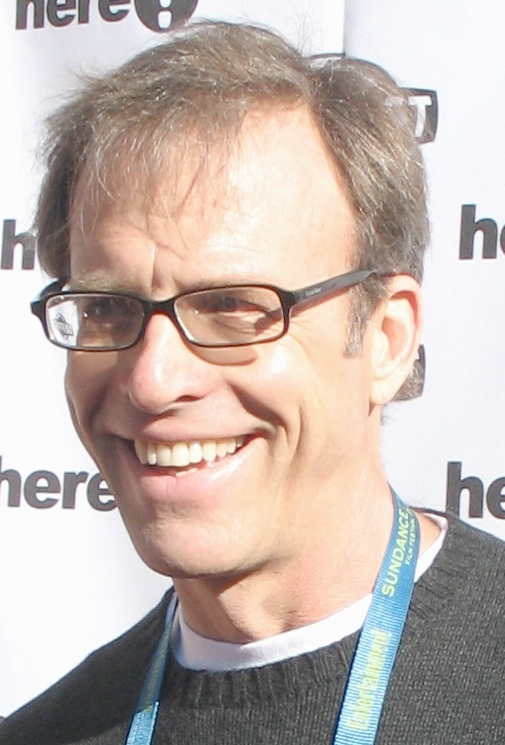
Dick at the 2006 Sundance Film Festival

Twist of Faith marked the beginning of a politicization of Dick's work, as his subsequent films similarly exposed the hypocrisy of powerful organizations. This Film Is Not Yet Rated (2006) hired Becky Altringer to investigate the Motion Picture Association of America and its secretive ratings board. The film argues that the MPAA serves major Hollywood studios' interests at the expense of independent filmmakers and also that it often turns a blind eye to violence while working to effectively censor sexual content, especially when it involves homosexuality or female sexual empowerment.

Dick's 2009 film, Outrage, discusses supposedly closeted politicians, predominantly Republican, who vote against gay rights. The film also criticizes the mainstream media's reluctance to report on this subject. The film received an Emmy nomination for Outstanding Investigative Journalism.

=== The Invisible War ===
In 2012, Dick directed The Invisible War, which examined the epidemic of rape in the U.S. military. It was heralded for exposing a culture of sexual abuse at Marine Barracks Washington. Several government officials have commented on the film's influence on policy, including Secretary of Defense Leon Panetta, who has said that viewing the film convinced him to implement a wave of reforms designed to reduce the prevalence of military sexual assault.

The film's revelations have also been discussed in congressional hearings and spurred lawmakers to seek better safeguards for assault survivors. Senator Kirsten Gillibrand credits the film with inspiring her to introduce the Military Justice Improvement Act, which would establish an independent judiciary to oversee accusations of sexual assault in the armed forces.

Among other honors, The Invisible War received a nomination for Best Documentary Feature at the 85th Academy Awards and won Emmy Awards for Best Documentary Feature and Outstanding Investigative Journalism.

=== The Hunting Ground ===
In 2015, The Hunting Ground premiered at the 2015 Sundance Film Festival. Written and Directed by Dick and produced by Amy Ziering, the documentary is about the incidence of sexual assault on U.S. college campuses and the failed response of college administrators. It was released on February 27, 2015, an edited version aired on CNN on November 22, 2015, and was released on DVD the week of December 1, 2015. It was released on Netflix in March 2016. Lady Gaga recorded an original song, "Til It Happens to You", for the film.

One day before the film's theatrical release, a bipartisan group of 12 U.S. Senators, accompanied by the film's lead subjects, Annie Clark and Andrea Pino, reintroduced the Campus Accountability and Safety Act requiring universities to adopt standard practices for weighing sexual charges, and to survey students on the prevalence of assault.

The Hunting Ground was nominated for a 2016 Emmy Award for Exceptional Merit in Documentary Filmmaking and for the Producers Guild of America's Outstanding Producer of Documentary Theatrical Motion Picture award. It won the 2016 Stanley Kramer Award given to "a production, producer or other individual whose achievement or contribution illuminates and raises public awareness of important social issues."The Hunting Ground was also one of the five movies nominated in the Documentary category of the 2016 MTV Movie Awards.

=== The Bleeding Edge ===
The Bleeding Edge premiered at the 2018 Tribeca Film Festival to rave reviews and received further critical acclaim after its worldwide release on Netflix on July 27, 2018. Currently at 100% on Rotten Tomatoes and a New York Times Critic's Pick of the Week, the documentary, written and directed by Dick and produced by Ziering and Amy Herdy, is an investigation into the $400 billion medical device industry, where the filmmakers find remarkably lax regulations, corporate coverups and profit-driven incentives that put patients at risk daily.

The film's impact was felt immediately as a week before its release, The Bleeding Edge became a part of a national news story when Bayer removed the birth control device Essure from the U.S. market, one of the many devices heavily criticized and warned about in the film. Entertainment Weekly added it to its list of documentaries that have changed the world. The documentary was awarded the George Polk Award for Medical Reporting—one of only a few documentaries to receive the award—and was nominated for a Peabody Award and the Grierson Award for Best Science Documentary.

=== On the Record ===
On October 23, 2017, Dick and Ziering announced an upcoming film on equity, parity, abuse, and representation in Hollywood. They had begun working on this project while screening The Invisible War. In a statement to media, Ziering said, "Every time we screened that film in Hollywood, actors and executives would come up to us and say that they had had similar experiences right here. So we began working on this project and immediately found ourselves grappling with the same forces that had kept this story silenced for so long. Everyone was frightened about what would happen to their careers, and worried about whether they would be sued. Distributors were unwilling to fund or release the film, and few people were willing to talk on the record."

Once the Harvey Weinstein sexual abuse allegations went public, funding appeared through Impact Partners, which also financed The Hunting Ground and The Invisible War. Ziering said, "People at long last are speaking out in large numbers, and we feel this industry, and the country, is finally ready for an unflinching film about the reality of sexual assault and harassment in Hollywood."

On the Record, Dick and Ziering's film about sexual abuse allegations against Def Jam co-founder Russell Simmons, premiered to a standing ovation at the 2020 Sundance Film Festival. The film, which includes the voices of nine alleged survivors such as Drew Dixon, Sheri Sher, Sil Lai Abrams, Jenny Lumet, and Kelly Cutrone, has received critical acclaim. On review aggregator website Rotten Tomatoes, the film holds an approval rating of 99% based on 71 reviews. The site's critical consensus reads: "On the Record uses harrowing first-person accounts to powerfully and persuasively confront the entrenched sexism of an industry and its culture." On Metacritic, the film has a weighted average score of 84 out of 100, based on 22 critic reviews, indicating "universal acclaim".

=== Allen v. Farrow ===
Dick and Ziering's first documentary series, Allen v. Farrow is a four-part series that examines the sexual assault allegation made against Woody Allen by his adopted daughter Dylan Farrow, who was seven when the abuse allegedly occurred. It follows the custody battle between Allen and his former partner Mia Farrow, his marriage to her adopted daughter Soon-Yi Previn, who is 35 years younger than Allen, and the events of subsequent years. The series premiered on HBO on February 21, 2021, with the last episode airing on March 14. On Rotten Tomatoes, the series holds an approval rating of 82% based on 56 reviews. On Metacritic, it has a weighted average score of 75 out of 100, based on 25 critics, indicating "generally favorable reviews".

RAINN announced that the series resulted in a nearly 20% increase in calls.

=== Not So Pretty ===
Dick and Ziering directed Not So Pretty, a four-part series about the beauty industry and harmful chemicals in products, narrated by Keke Palmer. It premiered on April 14, 2022, on HBO Max.

== Themes ==
Dick's work often focuses on issues of secrecy, hypocrisy, and human sexuality. Many of his films explore subjects and issues that have traditionally been taboo, such as homosexuality, sadomasochism, and sexual abuse. In Variety, Owen Gleiberman called Dick a "a deadly earnest but instinctively dramatic filmmaker." Ryan Stewart of Cinematical wrote, "Kirby Dick has been compared to photographer Diane Arbus in the way he prefers to open the camera lens to the pained, the freakish and the inexplicable that exists on the margins of everyday life."

Dick often employs intricately edited montages that blend together television news clips, archival footage, music videos, documentary interviews, and other sources. Beginning with This Film Is Not Yet Rated, he has also pioneered applying the "fair use" doctrine to appropriate copyrighted footage without obtaining licenses or compensating rights holders.

Dick often employs a cinéma vérité style. He has said that he prefers to work this way because it allows for a more complex relationship with his subjects. In many cases, Dick has also encouraged his subjects to record their own footage, which is then incorporated into his film.

Critics have increasingly remarked on the impact of his films as investigative journalism, with The New York Times's A. O. Scott writing, "Kirby Dick has become one of the indispensable muckrakers of American cinema, zeroing in on frequently painful stories about how power functions in the absence or failure of accountability" and Entertainment Weekly including three of his films on its list of documentaries that have "changed the world".

== Filmography ==
Year	Film	Director	Producer	Writer	Other	Subject matter of film
1981	Men Who Are Men	Yes	Yes			
1986	Private Practices: The Story of a Sex Surrogate	Yes	Yes			Sex surrogate Maureen Sullivan
1987	I Am Not a Freak			Yes	Editor	
1988	Patti Rocks				First AD	
1997	Sick: The Life and Death of Bob Flanagan, Supermasochist	Yes	Yes	Yes	Camera	Performance artist Bob Flanagan
1997	Guy			Yes		
2001	Chain Camera	Yes				Students at John Marshall High School in Los Angeles
2002	Derrida	Yes			Editor	Jacques Derrida
2003	Showgirls: Glitz & Angst	Yes	Executive			
2004	The End	Yes				
2005	Twist of Faith	Yes	Executive			Sexual abuse within the Catholic Church
2006	This Film Is Not Yet Rated	Yes		Yes	Camera	The Motion Picture Association of America's film rating system
2009	Outrage	Yes		Yes	Camera	Closeted gay or bisexual politicians who promote anti-gay legislation
2012	The Invisible War	Yes		Yes		Sexual assault in the United States military
2015	The Hunting Ground	Yes		Yes		Rape on college campuses
2018	The Bleeding Edge	Yes		Yes		Regulation of the medical device industry
2020	On the Record	Yes		Yes		Sexual assault allegations against Russell Simmons
2021	Allen v. Farrow	Yes	Executive			Sexual assault allegation against Woody Allen
2022	Not So Pretty	Yes	Executive	Yes		Investigation into the beauty industry

== Awards and nominations ==
Year	Award	Organization	Work	Category	Result
1997	Special Jury Prize	Sundance Film Festival	SICK: The Life & Death of Bob Flanagan, Supermasochist	Documentary Feature	Won
1997	Grand Prize	Los Angeles Film Festival	SICK: The Life & Death of Bob Flanagan, Supermasochist	Documentary Feature	Won
1998	OFTA Film Award	Online Film & Television Association	SICK: The Life & Death of Bob Flanagan, Supermasochist	Best Documentary Picture	Nominated
2001	Grand Jury Prize	Sundance Film Festival	Chain Camera	Documentary	Nominated
2002	Golden Gate Award	San Francisco Film Festival	Derrida	Documentary Feature	Won
2002	Grand Jury Prize	Sundance Film Festival	Derrida	Documentary	Nominated
2005	Academy Award	Academy of Motion Picture Arts and Sciences	Twist of Faith	Best Documentary	Nominated
2005	Grand Jury Prize	Sundance Film Festival	Twist of Faith	Documentary	Nominated
2006	Austin Film Critics Award	Austin Film Critics Association	This Film Is Not Yet Rated	Best Documentary	Won
2006	Critics Choice Award	Broadcast Film Critics Association	This Film Is Not Yet Rated	Best Documentary Feature	Nominated
2007	Golden Trailer Award	Golden Trailer Awards	This Film Is Not Yet Rated	Best Documentary	Won
2007	GLAAD Media Award	Gay & Lesbian Alliance Against Defamation	This Film Is Not Yet Rated	Outstanding Documentary	Nominated
2009	Jury Award	Miami Gay and Lesbian Film Festival	Outrage	Best Documentary	Won
2010	Emmy Award	National Academy of Television Arts and Sciences	Outrage	Outstanding Investigative Journalism: Long Form	Nominated
2010	Dorian Award	Gay and Lesbian Entertainment Critics Association (GALECA)	Outrage	Savage Wit of the Year	Nominated
2012	Audience Award	Sundance Film Festival	The Invisible War	Best Documentary	Won
2012	Nestor Almendros Award	Human Rights Watch Film Festival	The Invisible War	Courage in Filmmaking	Won
2012	Silver Heart Award	Dallas International Film Festival	The Invisible War	Humanitarian Award	Won
2012	Audience Award	Seattle International Film Festival	The Invisible War	Best Documentary	Won
2012	Audience Award	Provincetown International Film Festival	The Invisible War	Best Documentary Feature	Won
2012	Best of Festival	DocuWest International Documentary Film Festival	The Invisible War	Humanitarian Award	Won
2012	Advocacy Award	Peace Over Violence	The Invisible War	Humanitarian Award	Won
2012	IDA Award	International Documentary Association	The Invisible War	Best Feature	Nominated
2012	Audience Award	Gotham Independent Film Awards	The Invisible War	Audience Award	Nominated
2012	EDA Award	Alliance of Women Film Journalists	The Invisible War	Best Documentary Feature Film	Nominated
2013	Spirit Award	Film Independent	The Invisible War	Best Documentary	Won
2013	WGA Award	Writers Guild of America	The Invisible War	Best Documentary Screenplay	Nominated
2013	Academy Award	Academy of Motion Picture Arts and Sciences	The Invisible War	Best Documentary Feature	Nominated
2013	DGA Award	Directors Guild of America	The Invisible War	Documentary Directing	Nominated
2013	Ridenhour Prize	The Nation Institute	The Invisible War	Documentary Film	Won
2013	Peabody Award	The Peabody Awards	The Invisible War		Won
2013	Impact Award	BRITDOC Foundation	The Invisible War	Jury Special Commendation	Won
2014	Emmy Award	National Academy of Television Arts and Sciences	The Invisible War	Best Documentary Feature	Won
2014	Emmy Award	National Academy of Television Arts and Sciences	The Invisible War	Outstanding Investigative Journalism – Long Form	Won
2015	Best Documentary	Stockholm Film Festival	The Hunting Ground	Documentary Film	Nominated
2015	Grand Jury Award	Sheffield International Documentary Festival	The Hunting Ground	Best Documentary	Nominated
2015	Audience Award	Traverse City Film Festival	The Hunting Ground	Best Documentary Film	Runner-up
2015	Check Points	Bergen International Film Festival	The Hunting Ground	Human Rights Award	Won
2016	Cinema Eye Audience Choice Prize	Cinema Eye Honors Awards, US	The Hunting Ground	Audience Choice Prize	Nominated
2016	EDA Award	Alliance of Women Film Journalists	The Hunting Ground	Best Documentary Feature Film	Nominated
2016	Emmy Award	National Academy of Television Arts and Sciences	The Hunting Ground	Exceptional Merit in Documentary Filmmaking	Nominated
2016	Stanley Kramar Award	PGA Awards	The Hunting Ground	PGA Award	Won
2018	George Polk Award	George Polk Awards	The Bleeding Edge	Medical Reporting	Won
2019	Peabody Award	The Peabody Awards	The Bleeding Edge	Documentary Film	Nominated
2019	Grierson Award	Grierson Awards	The Bleeding Edge	Best Science Documentary	Nominated
