= Jonathan Tran =

Vietnamese-American theologian

Jonathan Tran is a Vietnamese-American theologian, and currently is a Professor of Theological Ethics at Duke Divinity School. He formerly held the George W. Baines Chair of Religion at Baylor University.

== Biography ==
Originally from Southern California, Tran received his BA (1994) from University of California, Riverside and his M.Div. (2002) and Ph.D. (2006) from Duke Divinity School where he studied under Stanley Hauerwas. He is an Associate Professor of Philosophical Theology and holds the George W. Baines Chair of Religion in the Department of Religion at Baylor University, where he researches and teaches theology, ethics, and identity theory.

== Works ==
- Tran, Jonathan (2010). The Vietnam War and Theologies of Memory: Time and Eternity in the Far Country. Wiley. ISBN 978-1-4443-2413-6.
- Tran, Jonathan (2011). Foucault and Theology. T&T Clark. ISBN 978-0-567-51039-6.
- Tran, Jonathan; Werntz, Myles, eds. (2013). Corners in the City of God: Theology, Philosophy, and The Wire. Wipf and Stock Publishers. ISBN 978-1-62189-972-3.
- Tran, Jonathan (2021). Asian Americans and the Spirit of Racial Capitalism. Oxford University Press. ISBN 978-0-1975-8790-4.
