= International Documentary Association =

International non-profit organization

- Formation: 1982; 44 years ago
- Type: Non-profit
- Legal status: Active
- Purpose: Public awareness of documentary films
- Headquarters: Los Angeles, California, U.S.
- Official language: English
- Website: documentary.org

International Documentary Association (IDA), founded in 1982, is a non-profit 501(c)(3) that promotes nonfiction filmmakers, and is dedicated to increasing public awareness for the documentary genre. Their major program areas are: Advocacy, Filmmaker Services, Education, and Public Programs and Events. Based in Los Angeles, the IDA has approximately 2,800 members in over 50 countries, providing a forum for supporters and suppliers of documentary filmmaking.

== Awards ==
The IDA Documentary Awards is an annual event presented by the International Documentary Association (IDA) to recognise excellence in documentary filmmaking. The ceremony highlights significant achievements across multiple categories, including Best Feature, Best Short, Best Writing, Best Director, Best Limited Series, and other creative and technical awards.

Previous winners in the Best Feature category include Crip Camp (2020), Flee (2021), All That Breathes (2022), Bobi Wine: The People's President (2023), and No Other Land (2024). All of these films were subsequently nominated for the Academy Award for Best Documentary Feature.

== Advocacy ==
The IDA advocates for, protects and advances the legal rights of documentary filmmakers. IDA has a long history of making the case for documentary filmmaking as a vital art form, and seeking ways to ensure that the artists who make documentaries receive appropriate funding. Most recently, IDA has been vocal in confronting the non-fiction film industry, to include promoting net neutrality efforts, lobbying for the development of strong public policies for the arts, lobbying for the appropriation of increased public funding for the arts, promoting fair use practice, and protecting the first amendment rights of filmmakers.

== Public programs and events ==
=== DocuDay ===
DocuDay is IDA's annual screening of the year's best documentary films, Oscar® nominated shorts and features and Independent Spirit Award winners. This event increases public awareness and appreciation for non-fiction films, and takes place in both New York City and Los Angeles.

=== IDA Documentary Screening Series ===
The IDA Documentary Screening Series brings some of the year's best documentary films to the IDA community and members of industry guilds and organizations. A moderated Q&A with filmmakers follows the screenings. In 2022, "Navalny", the story of Alexei Navalny, was screened.

== Filmmaker services ==
IDA provides services, tools and information for documentarians. Filmmaker services include IDA Membership, Fiscal Sponsorship, the Pare Lorentz Documentary Fund, Documentary magazine, and their website, Documentary.org.

=== Membership ===
IDA Membership provides members with benefits and opportunities, by promoting the documentary genre and the ability to engage with other IDA members. IDA Members have opportunities to network with and learn from nonfiction filmmakers, and also have access to the online Membership Directory. IDA Members are eligible to receive special invites to events including film screenings, workshops and networking opportunities; and are also eligible to vote for the annual IDA Documentary Awards in the Best Feature and Best Short categories.

=== Fiscal sponsorship ===
IDA's Fiscal Sponsorship Program allows documentary films in production to receive donations and grants. Fiscal sponsorship is a formal arrangement in which a 501(c)(3) public charity, such as the IDA, agrees to sponsor a project that furthers our mission, for the purpose of fundraising through grants and donations. This alternative to starting a unique nonprofit allows one to seek grants and solicit tax-deductible donations for a documentary, with the oversight, support and endorsement of IDA.

Over the years, this program has helped raise funds for titles such as Spellbound, Trouble the Water, The World According to Sesame Street, For the Bible Tells Me So, Dear Zachary, A Small Act, Garbage Dreams, The Man on Lincoln's Nose, Speaking in Strings, The Invisible War, and Fruits of Labor.

=== Pare Lorentz Documentary Fund ===
The Pare Lorentz Documentary Fund will provide annual production grants totaling $94,000 to be used in the creation of original, independent documentary films that illuminate pressing issues in the United States. Grants are made to up to 5 projects that tell a compelling story and focus on one of Pare Lorentz's central concerns—the appropriate use of the natural environment, justice for all or the illumination of pressing social problems. The fund supports full-length documentary films that reflect the spirit and nature of Pare Lorentz's work, exhibiting objective research, artful storytelling, strong visual style, high production values, artistic writing, outstanding music composition, as well as skilful direction, camerawork and editing. The Pare Lorentz Documentary Fund is made possible by The New York Community Trust.

In 2012, five films were recipients of the 2012 Pare Lorentz Documentary Fund Grants, including After Tiller, Citizen Corp, Four Walls Around Me, The New Black, and Remote Area Medical.

=== Documentary magazine ===
Documentary magazine is a quarterly publication that offers information to keep readers on track with the industry. The magazine has an international readership that includes over 20,000 readers. Circulation includes the 2,000 members of IDA, over 200 libraries, newsstand sales in Los Angeles, New York, and major cities throughout the US and Canada. The magazine features profiles of leading filmmakers like Michael Apted, Errol Morris, Michael Moore, Albert Maysles and Werner Herzog, among others. It also covers major international film/video festivals with an emphasis on documentaries and distribution, and the latest on production and new technology, trends and recent broadcast developments.

== Education ==
=== Doc U ===
Doc U is a series of hands-on educational seminars and workshops for aspiring and experienced documentary filmmakers, taught by artists and industry experts. Participants receive vital training and insight on various topics including fundraising; distribution; marketing; business tactics; and much more. Panelists from past Doc U events include Ondi Timoner, Fenton Bailey, R.J. Cutler, Harry Shearer, Kirby Dick, Roger Ross Williams, Joe Berlinger, Freida Lee Mock, Mitchell Block, Michael C. Donaldson and more.

=== Doc U Online ===
Launched in January 2013 with support from The Harnisch Foundation and Lekha Singh, Doc U Online brings the International Documentary Association's series of educational seminars and workshops for aspiring and experienced documentary filmmakers to IDA members across the globe. Taught by artists and industry experts, participants receive vital information and insight on various topics including licensing and copyright law, business tactics, documentary production, and the changing landscape and opportunities in documentary filmmaking.

== Archive ==
The Academy Film Archive houses the International Documentary Association Collection. The collection totals over 8,000 items and includes copies of many of the recent winners of the annual IDA Awards.

== See also ==
- Academy Award for Best Documentary Feature
- BAFTA Award for Best Documentary
- Critics' Choice Documentary Awards
- Cinema Eye Honors Awards
