= Austin Film Critics Association Awards 2006 =

2006 motion picture awards in Texas

2nd AFCA Awards

Best Film:
United 93

The 2nd Austin Film Critics Association Awards, honoring the best in filmmaking for 2006, were announced on January 2, 2007.

== Top 10 Films ==
1. United 93
2. The Departed
3. Pan's Labyrinth (El laberinto del fauno)
4. Brick
5. Children of Men
6. Borat
7. The Queen
8. Little Children
9. The Prestige
10. The Fountain

== Winners ==
- Best Film:
  - United 93
- Best Director:
  - Alfonso Cuarón – Children of Men
- Best Actor:
  - Leonardo DiCaprio – The Departed
- Best Actress:
  - Elliot Page – Hard Candy
- Best Supporting Actor:
  - Jack Nicholson – The Departed
- Best Supporting Actress:
  - Rinko Kikuchi – Babel
- Best Original Screenplay:
  - Pan's Labyrinth (El laberinto del fauno) – Guillermo del Toro
- Best Adapted Screenplay:
  - Children of Men – Alfonso Cuarón, Timothy J. Sexton, David Arata, Mark Fergus, and Hawk Ostby
- Best Cinematography:
  - Children of Men – Emmanuel Lubezki
- Best Foreign Film:
  - Pan's Labyrinth (El laberinto del fauno) • Mexico / Spain / United States
- Best Documentary:
  - This Film Is Not Yet Rated
- Best Animated Film:
  - Cars
- Best First Film:
  - Rian Johnson – Brick
- Breakthrough Artist:
  - Jennifer Hudson – Dreamgirls
- Austin Film Award:
  - A Scanner Darkly – Richard Linklater
