= Ceci N'est Pas Un Viol =

Work of performance art by Emma Sulkowicz

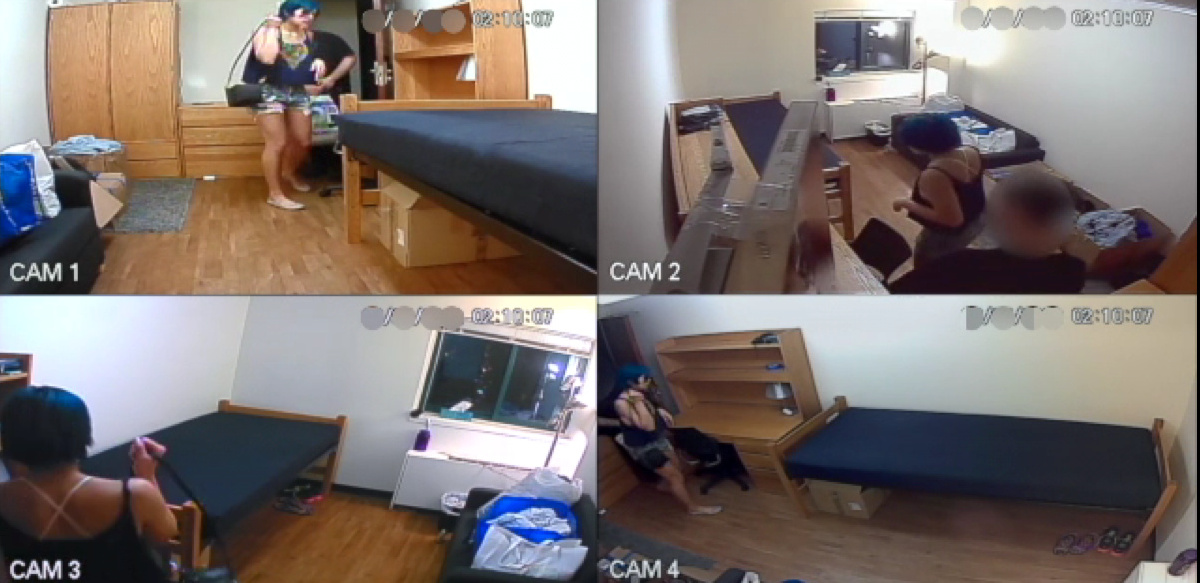
- Opening scene of the eight-minute video
- Artist: Emma Sulkowicz
- Year: Released 3 June 2015
- Type: Performance art, participatory art
- Subject: Sexual consent, campus sexual assault, social media
- Location: Columbia University, New York City
- Preceded by: Mattress Performance (Carry That Weight) (2014–2015)

Ceci N'est Pas Un Viol ("This is not a rape") is a work of performance art by American artist Emma Sulkowicz. Released on 3 June 2015, the work consists of a website hosting an eight-minute video, introductory text and an open comments section. The video shows Sulkowicz having sex with an anonymous actor in a dorm room at Columbia University in New York City. It was directed by artist Ted Lawson in early 2015, while Sulkowicz was in the final year of a visual-arts degree at Columbia.

The film illustrates the shift between consensual and non-consensual sex. Named after "Ceci n'est pas une pipe" from René Magritte's 1929 painting The Treachery of Images, the scene shows Sulkowicz and the actor engaging in what begins as a consensual sexual encounter and ends with what appears to be non-consensual anal sex. The text notes that the sex was consensual and only appears to be rape.

The online response in the comments to the video is a central part of the work, described as an example of participatory art. Sulkowicz wanted to know "what the public does with [the video], which begins with the way they deal with it from the moment it's disseminated." Shortly after it appeared, the video was taken offline by a denial-of-service attack. By 9 June 2015, there were 2,700 comments on the site, most of them negative or ridiculing. Sulkowicz said she (Note: Sulkowicz uses she/her and they/them pronouns. This article uses feminine pronouns for consistency.) strongly believed in the video's importance, but that making it had been a "traumatizing" experience.

== Background ==
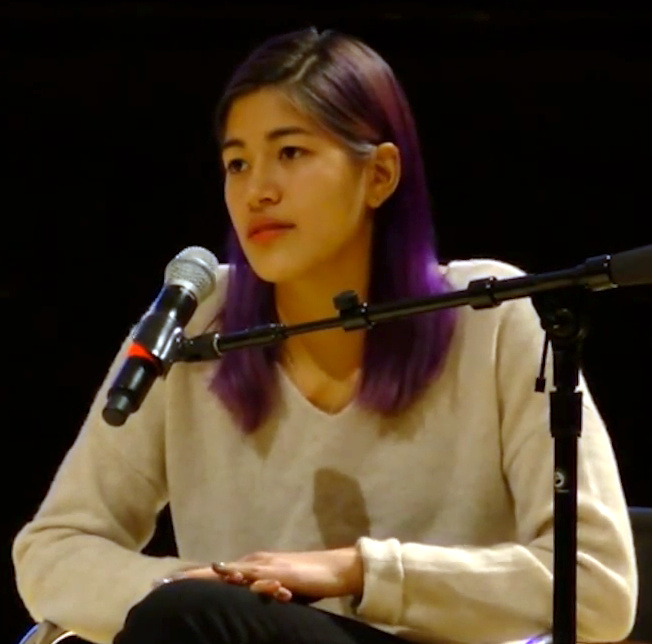
Emma Sulkowicz, 2014

Emma Sulkowicz, a non-binary artist who uses both she/her and they/them pronouns, obtained a degree in visual arts from Columbia University in 2015. Sulkowicz's senior thesis and first notable artwork was Mattress Performance (Carry That Weight) (2014–2015), which consisted of Sulkowicz carrying a mattress wherever she went on campus during her final year, in protest against campus sexual assault and the university's handling of a complaint she filed against a fellow Columbia student, who she said anally raped her. The university cleared the student of responsibility; the district attorney's office declined to pursue criminal charges, citing lack of reasonable suspicion.

== Work ==
=== Overview ===
Ceci N'est Pas Un Viol consists of a website that hosts a video, an introductory text and an open comments section. Its existence was made public by a Facebook post from the video's director, Ted Lawson. Sulkowicz says she had the idea for the piece in December 2014, and that performance artist Marina Abramović put her in touch with Lawson to direct it. Lawson told ArtNet that he thought the piece was "super risky" and courageous. Sulkowicz stressed that it was a separate piece from Mattress Performance.

Sulkowicz wrote the script and introductory text, chose the position of the cameras, the lighting and the appearance of it having been filmed by security cameras. The scene was filmed in one continuous take three times during the Columbia spring break in March 2015. According to Lawson, Sulkowicz had "insisted on it being completely real. ... That's what makes it a performance art piece." Sulkowicz told The Guardian that making the video had been traumatizing, and had left her in a "very scared, emotional state for days". Sulkowicz said elsewhere that vulnerability is part of what makes performance art good.

=== Text ===
The introductory text said that the video was not an enactment of Sulkowicz's rape allegation. Rather, "Ceci N'est Pas Un Viol ... [is] about your decisions, starting now." Sulkowicz gives only provisional consent to view the video:

Do not watch this video if your motives would upset me, my desires are unclear to you, or my nuances are indecipherable.

You might be wondering why I've made myself this vulnerable. Look—I want to change the world, and that begins with you, seeing yourself. If you watch this video without my consent, then I hope you reflect on your reasons for objectifying me and participating in my rape, for, in that case, you were the one who couldn't resist the urge to make Ceci N'est Pas Un Viol about what you wanted to make it about: rape.

Please, don't participate in my rape. Watch kindly.

She then asks a series of questions: "Are you searching for ways to either hurt or help me? ... Do you think I'm the perfect victim or the world's worst victim? ... Do you hate me? If so, how does it feel to hate me?"

=== Video ===
The scene is shown on a split screen from four angles, with a timestamp in each corner, beginning 02:10 and ending 02:18. Lawson said the security-camera perspective "removes the wall between the viewer and the action." The video begins with Sulkowicz and the actor, whose face is blurred, entering the room, undressing each other, then kissing and engaging in oral and vaginal sex, the latter with a condom. Three minutes into the video, the actor hits Sulkowicz several times, then removes the condom, pushes his hands and her legs against her neck or throat, and penetrates her anally. She screams, tells him to stop, and puts her hand over her face. After a short time, the actor stops abruptly and leaves the room with his clothes in his hands. Sulkowicz is left curled on the bed in the fetal position, with her back to the camera. After wrapping herself in a towel, she briefly leaves the room, returns and makes the bed, then appears to fall asleep. Lawson told the Columbia Spectator that Sulkowicz and the actor had captured the shift from the consensual to non-consensual: "I think the video expresses the possibility that you don't forfeit that [consensuality] ever."

=== Public comments ===
Lawson said Ceci N'est Pas Un Viol explores the relationship between art and social media, "this giant, polluted ocean." A key part of the work was the online reaction, particularly in the website's comments section. The 2,700 comments within the first five days were mostly critical or ridiculing. They included sexual, sexist and racist insults and threats. There were remarks about Sulkowicz's physical appearance, ethnicity, mental health, and that the scene did not depict rape. Someone posted the video on a porn site. Comments on other sites were both positive and negative. The video was the victim of a denial-of-service attack by hackers on 4 June according to DigitalOcean, which hosts the site, and on 5 June there were technical problems caused by the numbers attempting to access it.

== Analysis ==
Paul Mejia in Newsweek called the video a "harrowing document", while Priscilla Frank in The Huffington Post described it as "simple yet stinging, providing imagery that lingers like a nightmare, never quite comprehensible but impossible to forget." In the German edition of The Huffington Post, Benjamin Prüfer was less positive, calling it an "art video that can only be described as pornography."

Hannah Rubin, writing in The Forward, called it "sophisticated and brilliant", and despaired of the lack of empathy on display in the website's comments section. According to Julie Zeilinger, the video was "unsettling" for Sulkowicz's supporters, and several questioned the approach. On Slate's DoubleX Gabfest podcast, Hanna Rosin argued that the split-screen forces the viewer to embrace the subjective, in terms of choosing whether and how to watch, and how to interpret, which is the opposite of activism because it is too nuanced. The broadcast noted that Sandra Leong, Sulkowicz's mother, had written on Facebook in support of the work.

Suzannah Weiss wrote in Bustle that Sulkowicz's provisional consent to watch the video is a metaphor for sexual consent. The video is there to watch, but the viewer has a decision to make. No one has consent to watch with hostility or if they are unsure of the artist's desires. No one has consent to post it to a porn site. If the artist's terms are disregarded, the viewing is non-consensual. Rebecca Brink argued in The Frisky that, as well as illustrating the nature of sexual consent, Ceci N'est Pas Un Viol challenges the position that art, once made public, is removed from the artist's control and is for the viewer alone to interpret.

== See also ==
- Authorial intent
- "The Death of the Author"
- What Were You Wearing?
