= Columbia University rape accusation controversy =

In April 2013, Emma Sulkowicz, an American fourth-year visual arts major at Columbia University in New York City, filed a complaint with Columbia University requesting expulsion of fellow fourth-year student and German national, Paul Nungesser, alleging he had raped Sulkowicz in her (Note: Sulkowicz uses she/her and they/them pronouns. This article uses feminine pronouns for consistency.) dorm room on August 27, 2012. Nungesser was found not responsible by a university inquiry. In May 2014, Sulkowicz filed a report against Nungesser with the New York Police Department (NYPD), who did not pursue charges. The district attorney's office interviewed both students, but did not pursue charges, citing lack of reasonable suspicion. Sulkowicz declined to pursue criminal charges any further, and stated that NYPD officers were dismissive and had mistreated her.

After Columbia declined to take action against Nungesser, Sulkowicz produced a work of performance art entitled Mattress Performance (Carry That Weight) as a senior thesis, which involved Sulkowicz carrying a 50-pound dorm mattress on campus to represent the painful burden rape victims carry throughout daily life, and in protest of what Sulkowicz described as Columbia University's mishandling of the sexual assault complaint. Nungesser called Sulkowicz's allegations untrue, citing as evidence behavior Nungesser said was counterintuitive, such as friendly texts Sulkowicz sent Nungesser days after the alleged attack occurred, and described the mattress piece as an act of bullying intended to force him to leave Columbia.

In April 2015, Nungesser filed a Title IX gender discrimination lawsuit against Columbia, its board of trustees, university president Lee Bollinger, and Sulkowicz's supervising art professor Jon Kessler, alleging that Columbia had facilitated gender-based harassment by allowing Sulkowicz to receive course credit for the performance. Federal District Court Judge Gregory H. Woods dismissed the lawsuit, but allowed Nungesser to refile an amended suit, which was settled by Columbia in July 2017. In 2017, the university issued a statement acknowledging that Nungesser experienced a very difficult time, promised to keep its gender-based misconduct policies fair, and settled Nungesser's lawsuit under undisclosed terms.

== Emma Sulkowicz ==
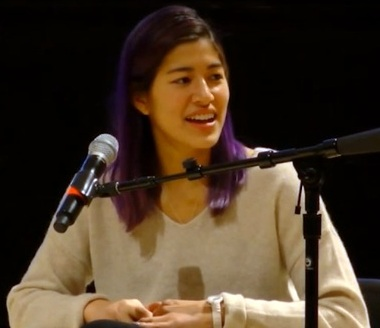
Sulkowicz in December 2014

Emma Sulkowicz, born on October 3, 1992, in New York City, attended The Dalton School on the Upper East Side where she was an A student and competitive fencer. In 2011 she began her undergraduate studies at Columbia University as a visual arts major.

== Paul Nungesser ==
Paul Jonathan Nungesser (German: Nungeßer; born 1991 in Berlin) is a German citizen who studied architecture at Columbia.

== Allegations ==
=== Allegations by Sulkowicz ===
On April 18, 2013, Sulkowicz reported to Columbia's Office of Gender-Based and Sexual Misconduct that, on the first day of her sophomore year on August 27, 2012, in Sulkowicz's dorm room, she was raped by fellow student Nungesser. Describing the alleged rape, Sulkowicz said that what began as a consensual sexual encounter in Sulkowicz's room turned non-consensual. Sulkowicz alleged that Nungesser choked her, slapped her face, held her wrists, and anally raped her, while Sulkowicz struggled and told him to stop. Sulkowicz said that after the alleged assault, Nungesser immediately left the room without speaking.

Both Sulkowicz and Nungesser corroborated that they had consensual sex twice before, earlier in the year, but not anal sex. Nungesser said that the encounter in August was also entirely consensual, and he denied the allegations of violence, stating that they briefly had consensual anal sex, followed by other sexual activity, after which they fell asleep, saying he left the room early in the morning while Sulkowicz was still sleeping.

Afterwards they communicated via Facebook messages. Nungesser later described these messages as "amiable" and showed transcripts of these messages to Cathy Young, a contributor for The Daily Beast who has been critical of campus sexual assault activism. Sulkowicz expressed concern that the messages would be used to present her as unreliable, and stated she had sent them because she was upset and wanted to talk to him about the incident but decided against doing so. By the time of Sulkowicz's last message, sent in March 2013, she had visited the university's Office of Gender-Based Misconduct and was asked whether she had tried talking to the accused. A university spokesperson said in February 2015 that its gender-based misconduct policy does not recommend informal resolution or mediation for such complaints. In response to criticisms regarding the delay in reporting, Sulkowicz said she initially did not report the incident to avoid emotional trauma.

=== Allegations from others ===
Three other complaints have been alleged against Nungesser: a second woman accused him of emotional abuse and nonconsensual sex during a months-long relationship, a third student accused him of non-consensually kissing her and touching her at a party, and a fourth accuser emerged in early 2015, a fourth-year male student who said Nungesser sexually assaulted him after an emotional conversation. The second accuser's investigation was discontinued after she said she was "exhausted by the barrage of questions" and stopped responding to emails from the University's Title IX coordinator for sexual assault investigations.

In early 2013, Sulkowicz discussed the incident with "Natalie", Nungesser's former girlfriend. Natalie alleged that there had been non-consensual sex and emotional abuse during her relationship with Nungesser, which lasted from October 2011 to spring 2012. Nungesser denies that charge and describes their time together as a couple as a "difficult relationship". Sulkowicz said that the conversation with Natalie prompted Sulkowicz to file a formal complaint to the university. Sulkowicz filed a complaint on April 18, 2013, and Natalie filed one a few days later.

The third complaint from a student identified as "Josie" was initially decided against Nungesser, with an assigned punishment of disciplinary probation, but Nungesser successfully appealed, citing procedural errors and problems with the admission of hearsay. Nungesser further appealed on grounds that his accuser had failed to demonstrate guilt by a "preponderance of the evidence" as required in campus hearings. He says the allegations, which were all brought within days of each other, were the result of collusion and are fraudulent. The three women said in interviews with The New York Times that they decided to file formal complaints with the school after they heard about one another's experiences. The fourth student, identified as "Adam", said he first reported the incident to the group to which they both belonged, and then he filed a Title IX complaint. Columbia also investigated the complaint and found Nungesser "not responsible". According to Cathy Young, the investigators found contradictions in Adam's statements and Facebook dialogs between the men.

== Outcome of Sulkowicz's hearing and Nungesser's first complaints ==
On October 29, the day after Nungesser's third accuser's hearing, one was scheduled for Sulkowicz's case. In November the university found Nungesser "not responsible". Sulkowicz's request for an appeal was turned down by the dean. Sulkowicz and Nungesser both complained separately about the proceedings. Sulkowicz complained that Nungesser was granted months of postponements during the hearing, and that she was not allowed to discuss the case with anyone. Sulkowicz said that a university investigator asked inappropriate questions during the interview, and complained that the panel did not consider other allegations against Nungesser. A graduate student who acted as Nungesser's official supporter during the hearing defended the panel, disputing that their questions were inappropriate and saying the questions "were extremely personal because they had to be".

Nungesser complained that he had not been allowed to introduce Facebook messages as evidence. Nungesser and Sulkowicz exchanged several messages in the days and weeks after the alleged rape. In one message, two days after the alleged rape, Sulkowicz accepted an invitation to a party from Nungesser, writing: "I feel like we need to have some real time where we can talk about life and thingz, because we still haven't really had a paul-emma chill sesh since summmmerrrr." Sulkowicz says she sent the messages because she was upset and wanted to talk to Nungesser about the incident. Reporter Katie Zavadski, writing for New York, opined that amicable exchanges with an alleged attacker did not disprove that a sexual assault occurred, and Cathy Young acknowledged that victims of sexual violence may cope with trauma in ways that could seem puzzling to outsiders.

== Press break, publicity and federal complaint ==
The New York Post broke the story in December 2013, without naming either party. On April 7, 2014, Sulkowicz appeared with U.S. Senator Kirsten Gillibrand (D-NY) at a press conference about sexual assault on campus, with Gillibrand telling reporters that Sulkowicz had been raped. On April 24, Sulkowicz and 22 other students (later joined by five others) filed a 100-page federal complaint alleging that Columbia University and Barnard College mishandled their sexual assault complaints, in violation of Title IX, a federal civil rights law to ensure gender equality on campuses. The complaint alleged that the universities were in violation of Title II, a provision against discrimination by a public body on the basis of disability, and the Clery Act, which requires federally financed universities to disclose campus crime statistics. The Department of Education's Office for Civil Rights opened two investigations in January 2015 into the Title IX and Title II complaints against Columbia.

On May 3, 2014, an interview with Sulkowicz appeared on the front page of The New York Times. For several days from May 7 onwards, Paul Nungesser's name was included within lists of "sexual assault violators" written on the walls or doors of campus bathrooms, or on flyers. On May 14, Sulkowicz filed a report with the NYPD. Columbia's student newspaper, the Columbia Daily Spectator, controversially published the accused student's name two days later. The editors stated that they felt it would be "irresponsible to keep his name hidden", noting that Nungesser had been at the center of three sexual assault complaints as well as a number of fliers posted around campus. Nungesser said he agreed to be interviewed by detectives from the NYPD's Sex Victims Division in August, but that shortly after this the district attorney's office told him they would not be pursuing the case. Sulkowicz declined to pursue an investigation after discovering the case could extend past graduation, when she would probably want to "erase all of [her] memories of Columbia". Sulkowicz further stated that NYPD officers were dismissive and "badly mistreated" her.

== Sulkowicz's performance art piece ==
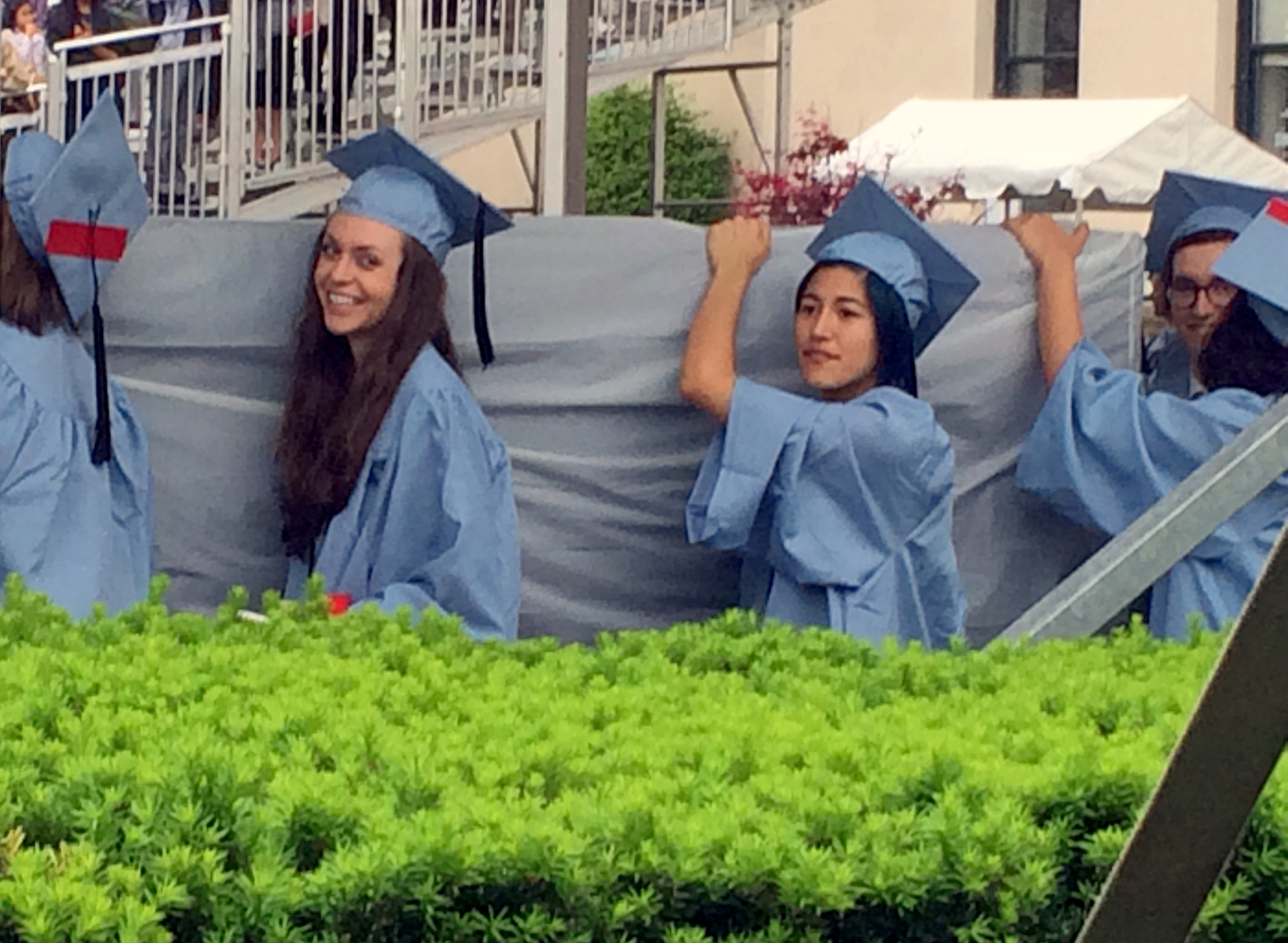
Sulkowicz (center right) carrying the mattress at graduation

Sulkowicz created Mattress Performance (Carry That Weight) in the summer of 2014 for her senior thesis while at Yale University Summer School of Art and Music. Her first effort was a video of herself dismantling a bed, accompanied by the audio of her filing the police report, which she had recorded on her cellphone. The mattress later became the sole focus of the piece. Sulkowicz told New York magazine:

I thought about how ... the mattress represents a private place where a lot of your intimate life happens; and how I have brought my life out in front for the public to see; and the act of bringing something private and intimate out into the public mirrors the way my life has been. Also the mattress as a burden, because of what has happened there, that has turned my own relationship with my bed into something fraught.

The 50-pound (23 kg), dark-blue, extra-long twin mattress used in the performance art piece is of the kind Columbia places in its dorms, similar to the one on which she alleges she was raped. Sulkowicz spent the summer of 2014 creating the rules of engagement: Written on the walls of her studio in the university's Watson Hall, these state that she must carry the mattress whenever she is on university property; that it must remain on campus even when Sulkowicz is not there; and that she is not allowed to ask for help in carrying it, but if help is offered she may accept it. In September that year she began carrying it on campus, which she says was a physically painful experience. Sulkowicz later created another piece of performance art, Ceci N'est Pas Un Viol ("This is not a rape"), a website with an eight-minute video of Sulkowicz having sex with an anonymous actor in a dorm room at Columbia University.

== Nungesser's lawsuit ==
On April 23, 2015, Nungesser filed a sexual discrimination lawsuit against Columbia, its board of trustees, its president Lee Bollinger, and Sulkowicz's supervising art professor Jon Kessler. The suit alleged that the performance was bullying and constituted gender-based harassment, and argued that Columbia's offering course credit for the work violated his rights under Title IX. The suit sought damages for the harm Nungesser said he experienced to his reputation as a result of the performance. The suit also faulted Columbia University for sponsoring a project that accused him of rape, despite finding him "not responsible" for the allegation after an inquiry. The suit alleged gender based discrimination, arguing that Nungesser was "targeted because he is a male, and attacked for his (consensual) sexual activity." Nungesser's suit also alleged that the publicity surrounding the case had harmed his job prospects.

Sulkowicz responded to the lawsuit by saying it is "ridiculous that Paul would sue not only the school but one of my past professors for allowing me to make an art piece" and saying that Nungesser has made "continued public attempts to smear my reputation". The school, via one of its spokespeople, had no official comment on the lawsuit, and Kessler also declined to comment, although Columbia University president Bollinger offered a general statement: "The law and principles of academic freedom allow students to express themselves on issues of public debate; at the same time, our legal and ethical responsibility is to be fair and impartial in protecting the rights and accommodating the concerns of all students in these matters."

=== Outcome ===
The case was assigned to U.S. District Court Judge Gregory Woods. Woods dismissed the case in March 2016, but allowed Nungesser another attempt. Nungesser issued an amended complaint in April 2016. The amended complaint argued that Columbia University's sexual assault policies promoted a stereotype of the "sex-driven male", and constituted gender based discrimination in violation of Title IX. On March 24, 2017, Woods dismissed Nungesser's re-filed complaint, ruling that Nungesser had failed to state an actionable claim against Columbia University. Nungesser's attorney began the process of appealing the dismissal, but on July 14, 2017, Columbia and Nungesser agreed to settle the lawsuit. The university said in a statement that Nungesser was cleared "after a diligent and thorough investigation. Columbia University stands by that finding ... Columbia recognizes that after the conclusion of the investigation, Paul's remaining time at Columbia became very difficult for him and not what Columbia would want any of its students to experience. Columbia will continue to review and update its policies toward ensuring that every student—accuser and accused, including those like Paul who are found not responsible—is treated respectfully and as a full member of the Columbia community." The terms of the settlement were confidential.

=== Commentary on lawsuit ===
Robby Soave, an editor for Reason, commented that Nungesser was "flipping the script" by basing his suit on Title IX, because "many alleged victims of rape who believe that they were deprived of justice have turned to Title IX when they assert that their universities are failing to honor federal requirements." Some commentators expressed skepticism that Nungesser's claim would succeed in court. Megan McArdle commented on the Title IX complaint in Bloomberg View saying, "I don't find (Nungesser's) litany of complaints particularly compelling", and stated that she believed the gender discrimination claim was unlikely to succeed. McArdle concluded by suggesting that Nungesser may not have intended to win the suit or to silence Sulkowicz, but instead to "force the media to pay a little attention to his side of the story, something that didn't happen during the many long months of Sulkowicz's campaign to name and shame him." Slate columnist Nora Caplan-Bricker questioned whether the suit could succeed, noting that courts have previously dismissed similar suits in which men accused of sexual assault claimed that they were victims of gender discrimination.

Cathy Young, commenting on the dismissal of Nungesser's suit in the New York Post, conceded that "Nungesser's case is more of an uphill battle than most", but nevertheless argued that she hoped "the lawsuit goes forward—not only on Nungesser's behalf, but for the sake of truth-seeking about a tangled case that raises important issues." Amanda Marcotte, in a column for the news site Talking Points Memo, criticized Nungesser's decision to pursue a claim under Title IX rather than file a libel suit, and characterized the suit as a "nuisance lawsuit". This characterization was disputed by Samantha Harris of the Foundation for Individual Rights in Education, who instead argued that the suit demonstrated the problem with requiring universities to investigate accusations of sexual assault, cautioning that "until something changes, we are likely to see more cases like this one."

== Reception ==
Public opinion regarding the case and lawsuit has been mixed. Cathy Young, who has written other "stories critical of campus anti-rape activism", criticized Columbia University for violating the defendant's rights to due process, commenting there was "certainly enough evidence to grant Nungesser the benefit of reasonable doubt not only in legal disciplinary proceedings, but in the court of public opinion". KC Johnson, history professor at Brooklyn College, argued that Sulkowicz's performance violated Columbia University's policy instructing participants in campus hearings to "make all reasonable efforts to maintain the confidentiality/privacy of the involved parties". Janet Halley, a professor at Harvard Law School, commented that Columbia University's promise to review its policies was "a confession" that it thinks it made a mistake in how it dealt with the case.

Erin Gloria Ryan of Jezebel supported Sulkowicz, criticizing Young and accusing her of invoking a "perfect victim" narrative that relied on inaccurate stereotypes about how sexual assault victims should behave. Senator Kirsten Gillibrand invited Sulkowicz to a State of the Union address in an effort to "further amplify" her voice, saying that activists like her "shine a light on the scourge of sexual assault" on college campuses. When the lawsuit was settled, Dana Bolger, co-founder of Know Your IX, expressed concern, saying she hoped universities would not take the result "as a sign that they should be cracking down on student activism".
