= Sulkowicz =

Sulkowicz is a surname. Notable people with the surname include:

- Ed Sulkowicz (born 1954), Australian rugby league footballer
- Emma Sulkowicz (born 1992), American artist and activist
- Kerry Sulkowicz (born 1958), American psychiatrist and psychoanalyst
