= Art fabrication =

Art fabrication describes the process or service of producing large or technically difficult artworks through entities and resources beyond an individual artist's studio. When artists or designers are incapable or choose not to realize their designs or conceptions, they may enlist the assistance of an art fabrication company. Typically, an art fabrication company has access to the resources, specialized machinery and technologies, and labor necessary to execute particularly complex projects. According to a 2018 New York Times article, art fabricators have taken on a greater importance in recent years, as art schools have emphasized ideas and concepts over execution and contemporary artists become less present in their own work.

== History ==
Art fabrication in its contemporary form, as opposed to the older foundry model that translated maquettes from one material into another, came into being in the 1960s. Its advent stemmed from several factors: the emergence of Pop and Conceptual artists increasingly interested in technologically ambitious projects and spectacle, often emphasizing idea over object; artists such as Donald Judd, Robert Morris, and Richard Serra, who sought to eliminate evidence of the "artist's hand" from their work; and in later years, buoyant art markets that made ambitious projects economically viable and created demands to produce work and exhibit in larger and more numerous museums.

In the first half of the 1960s, industrial manufacturers, such as Treitel-Gratz Co. (a high-end producer of modernist fixtures and furniture) and Milgo Industrial (then an architectural fabricator, now Milgo/Bufkin) on the East Coast, worked with artists. They extended the possibilities of studio practice by providing access to the resources, tools, materials and techniques of industrial production. The industrial fabricators were soon joined by companies solely dedicated to art fabrication, first by New York-based Lippincott, Inc., (established in 1966 by Donald Lippincott and Roxanne Everett), and then by Gemini G.E.L. (established 1965 and led by Sidney Felsen), a Los Angeles-based print workshop that expanded into the production of artist multiples (limited editions of sculpture). These firms, which offered a greater degree of collaboration between artist and crew, worked with several previously mentioned artists, as well as Sol LeWitt, Louise Nevelson, Barnett Newman, Claes Oldenburg, Robert Rauschenberg, and Lucas Samaras.

When Gemini got out of the multiples business, one its employees, Peter Carlson, left and formed Carlson & Company (1971), working with artists Ellsworth Kelly and Isamu Noguchi, among others. New fabricators soon emerged in the West, such as La Paloma Fine Arts and Jack Brogan, who worked with artists such as, respectively, Dennis Oppenheim and Jonathan Borofsky, and Robert Irwin and Roy Lichtenstein. Art historian Michelle Kuo suggests that these companies increasingly served as conduits between artists and industry and technology, expanding the scope, proportions and complexity of art fabrication. She writes that they researched and solved "new engineering and organizational problems with both patent-worthy and outmoded or discarded technologies," introducing processes and materials from auto detailing to injection moulding to surfboard glassing into fine-arts practice. Throughout the 1990s and 2000s, art fabrication incorporated advanced technologies, service and sourcing from the aerospace, computer defense, semiconductor and entertainment industries, that not only encompassed art production (CAD, 3D scanning and modeling, CNC milling, paint finishing), but also project management, shipping and installation.

== Notable art fabricators ==
- Carlson Baker Arts in Sun Valley, CA, who have worked with Ellsworth Kelly, Isamu Noguchi, Jeff Koons, Yoshitomo Nara, Claes Oldenburg, Jim Isermann, Christian Moeller, Doug Aitken, Rob Ley, and others.
- Lippincott, Inc. (now closed), which fabricated work for almost 100 artists, including Barnett Newman, Louise Nevelson, Donald Judd, Claes Oldenburg, Robert Indiana, and Ellsworth Kelly.
- HANDMADE LLC, Van Nuys, CA, whose clients include Charles Ray (Artist), Jeff Koons, Judd Foundation, Mary Corse, Dan Colen, Laura Owens, and Jordan Wolfson.
- Standard Sculpture LLC, located in Glassell Park, CA, whose clients include Jeff Koons, Carol Bove, Nathan Mabry, Matt Johnson, and Jacob Kassay.
- Mike Smith, who has worked on behalf of Damien Hirst, Rachel Whiteread, Jake and Dinos Chapman, Gavin Turk and Michael Landy.
- Milgo/Bukin (formerly Milgo Industrial), which has worked with Donald, Judd, Robert Grosvenor, and Richard Serra, among others.
- Ted Lawson, founder of Prototype New York, who has worked on behalf of Jeff Koons, Yoko Ono, Mariko Mori, Vanessa Beecroft, Ellen Gallagher, Keith Tyson and Ghada Amer.
- Smith of Derby Group, who have worked with Marianne Forrest and Wolfgang & Heron.
- Amaral Custom Fabrications, Inc. in Bristol, Rhode Island, whose notable clients include Roy Lichtenstein, Keith Haring, Martin Puryear, Ryan McGinness, Robert Indiana, Jeff Koons, Philip Grausman, and Hasbro.
- Master Art Fabrication, Chiang Mai, Thailand, whose notable clients include Charles Krafft, Doug Jeck, Trevor Foster, and Kamol Tassananchalee.
- Gizmo Art Production, Inc. (San Francisco, CA), works with Ned Kahn, Blessing Hancock, Michael Arcega, Jim Campbell, and Ana Teresa Fernandez.
- SPM-Design (Orange, CA), working with artists such as Heather Day, Niki Zarrabi, and Kim West SPM-Design focuses on interior sculptural installations and large scale murals including the largest mural in California by area for the Huntington Beach Energy Project.
