= Mattress Performance (Carry That Weight) =

Work of endurance art (2014–2015)

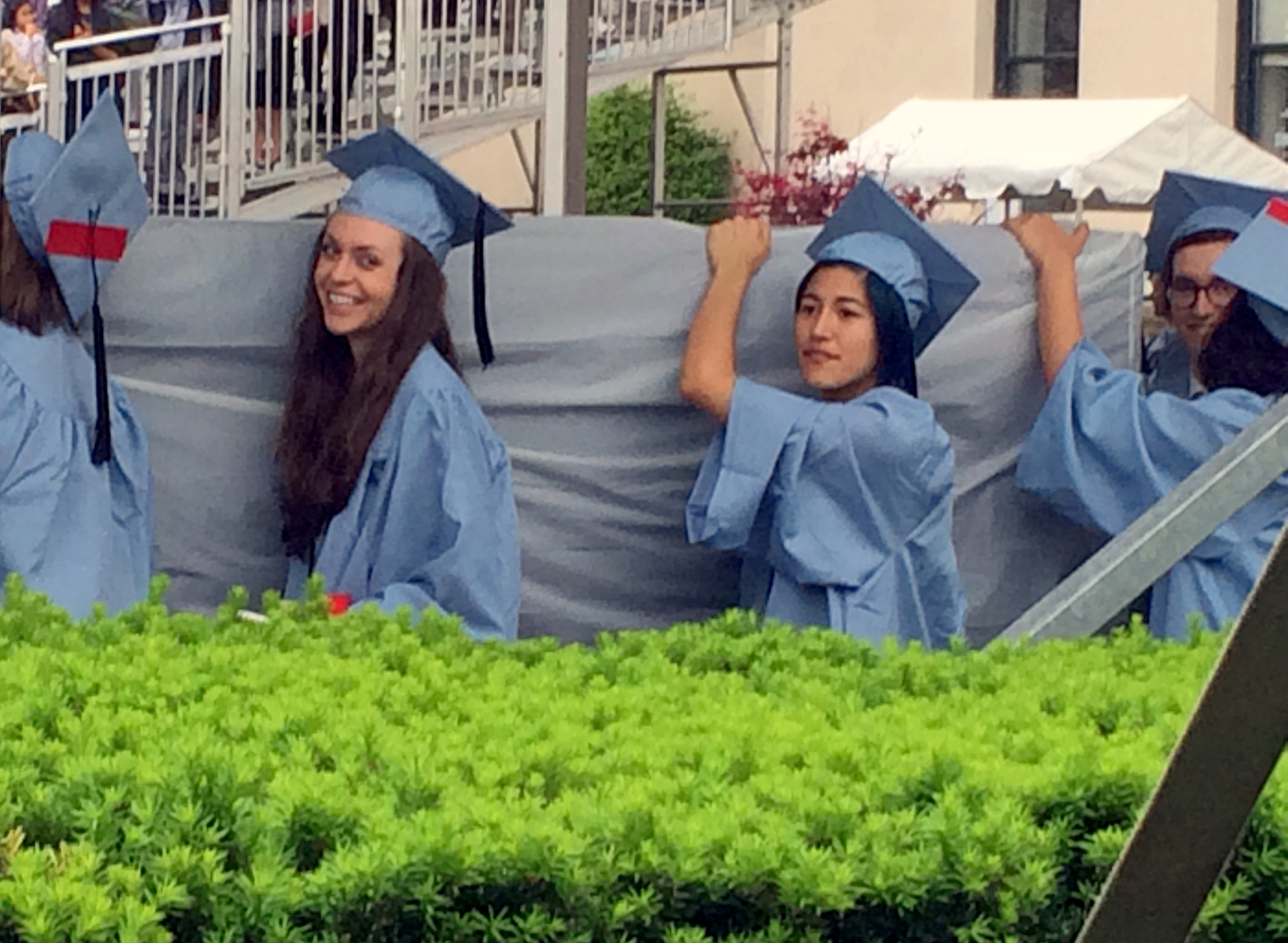
- Emma Sulkowicz (center right) with Mattress Performance at graduation, May 19, 2015
- Artist: Emma Sulkowicz
- Year: September 2014 – May 2015
- Type: Performance art, endurance art, feminist art
- Location: Columbia University, Morningside Heights, Manhattan, New York City

Mattress Performance (Carry That Weight) (2014–2015) was a work of endurance/performance art which Emma Sulkowicz conducted as a senior thesis during the final year of a visual arts degree at Columbia University in New York City.

Begun in September 2014, the piece involved Sulkowicz carrying a 50-pound (23 kg) mattress, of the kind that Columbia uses in its dormitories, around campus. Sulkowicz said the piece would end when a student Sulkowicz alleged raped her (Note: Sulkowicz uses she/her and they/them pronouns. This article uses feminine pronouns for consistency.) in her dorm room in 2012 was expelled or otherwise left the university. Sulkowicz carried the mattress until the end of the spring semester, as well as to the graduation ceremony in May 2015. Sulkowicz kept a diary throughout, amounting to 59,000 words at the end of the work, recording her experiences as well as the misunderstandings of commentators.

Fellow student Paul Nungesser, whom Sulkowicz accused, was found not responsible by a university inquiry into the allegations, and police declined to pursue a criminal complaint against him, citing a lack of reasonable suspicion. Nungesser called Sulkowicz's accusation "untrue and unfounded" and called Mattress Performance an act of bullying. In 2015, Nungesser filed a lawsuit against the university and several administrators alleging that the school exposed him to gender-based harassment by allowing Mattress Performance to go forward. In 2017, the university settled the suit for undisclosed terms, and pledged to reform its disciplinary policies.

The piece stirred controversy with praise from art critics and criticism from some commentators. Art critic Jerry Saltz called Mattress Performance "pure radical vulnerability" and one of the best art shows of 2014. Journalist Emily Bazelon of The New York Times Magazine described the work and events surrounding it as "a triumph" for the survivor movement and "a nightmare" for the accused. Caught between defending and enabling Sulkowicz's freedom of expression and Nungesser's right to due process and the university's written policies regarding confidentiality, the university was criticized by both parties and their parents for its handling of the issue.

== Background ==
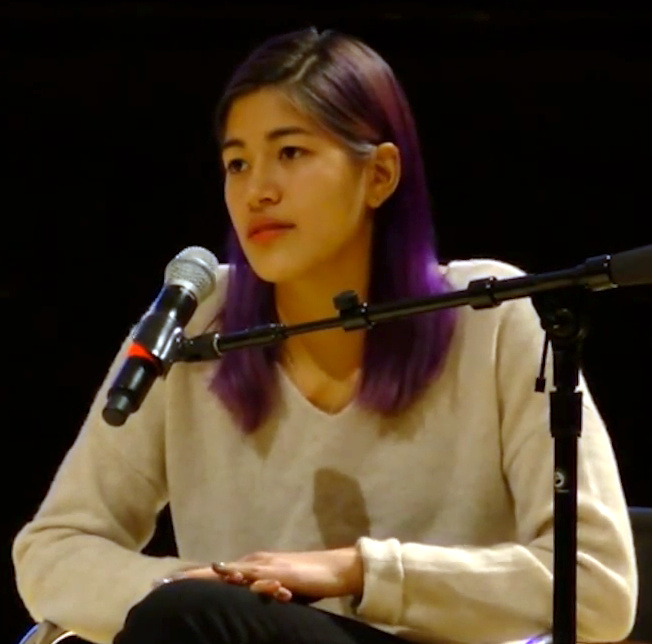
Sulkowicz, December 2014

Emma Sulkowicz attended Dalton School on the Upper East Side, and in 2011 began a visual arts degree at Columbia University. Sulkowicz alleges that she was slapped, choked, and anally raped by Nungesser in Sulkowicz's dorm room, on the first day of her second year in August 2012, during what began as a consensual sexual encounter. Nungesser denies the allegation, insisting that the encounter was entirely consensual. In April 2013, 8 months after the encounter, Sulkowicz filed a complaint with the university. Sulkowicz says she filed a complaint after encountering two female students who said they had also been victimized by Nungesser. One was a former girlfriend who said she was emotionally abused during their long-term relationship, and stated that she later recognized their sexual relations as having been non-consensual. The other said that on one occasion Nungesser had moved toward her aggressively, grabbed her arms, and attempted to kiss her. Shortly after Sulkowicz filed a complaint, the two other students with whom she was acquainted also filed complaints with the university against the same student. Columbia ultimately cleared him of responsibility in all three cases.

The case attracted wider attention when the three students who filed complaints gave interviews to the New York Post, which broke the story on December 11, 2013, without naming those involved. In April 2014 Sulkowicz appeared with Senator Kirsten Gillibrand at a press conference about campus sexual assault.

On April 24, 2014, 23 students filed a federal complaint against Columbia and Barnard College, alleging violations of Title IX of the Education Amendments of 1972, a law upholding gender equality in federally-funded institutions. (Note: Title IX says: "No person in the United States shall, on the basis of sex, be excluded from participation in, be denied the benefits of, or be subjected to discrimination under any education program or activity receiving federal financial assistance." It was passed on June 23, 1972, in response to discrimination against women in universities and colleges, which included quotas, requiring higher grades from women, and offering them reduced choice in degree programs. Five other students later joined the complaint against Columbia, also alleging that the university was in violation of Title II, a provision against discrimination on the basis of disability, and the Clery Act.) Among other issues, the complaint alleged that the institutions discourage students from reporting sexual assault, that alleged perpetrators are not removed from campus, and that sanctions are too lenient. The Department of Education's Office for Civil Rights opened an investigation in January 2015.

On May 14, 2014, Sulkowicz filed a complaint with the New York Police Department. The district attorney's office interviewed Sulkowicz and Nungesser in August, but did not pursue charges, citing lack of reasonable suspicion.

== Creation and performance ==
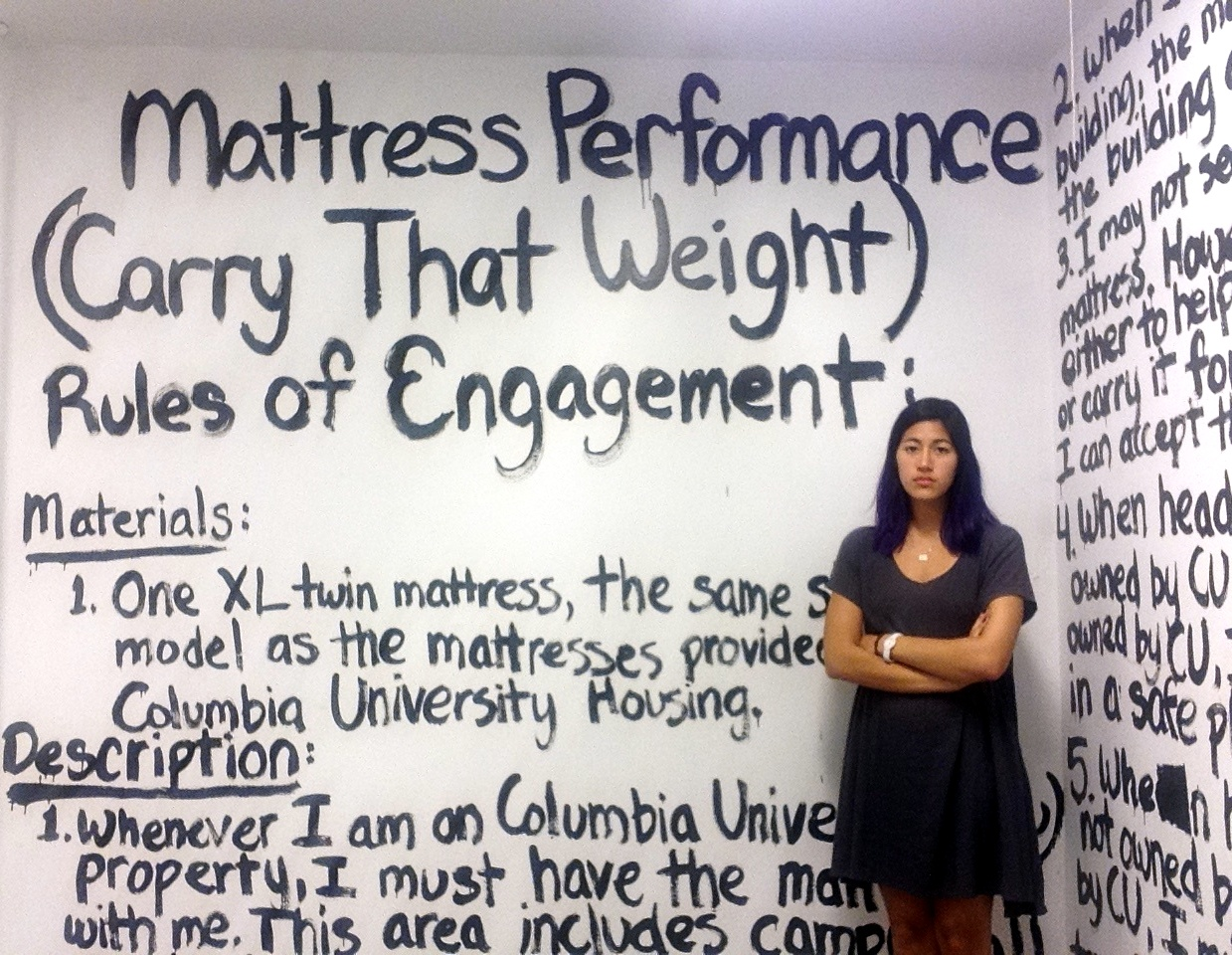
Mattress Performance rules of engagement, Sulkowicz's studio, Columbia University, 2014

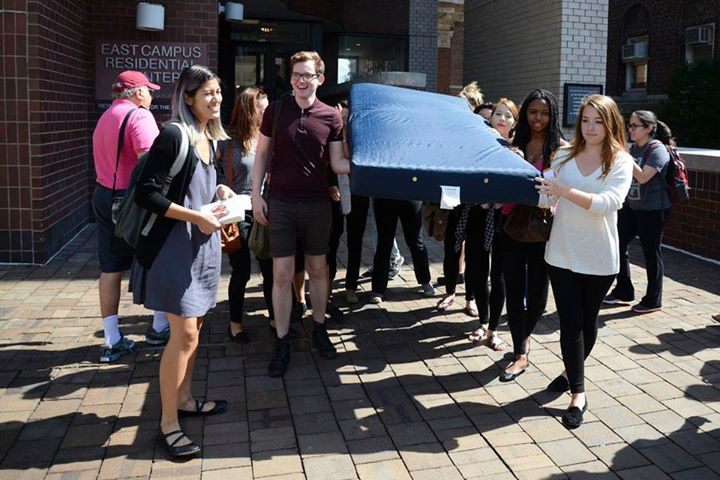
"Carry that Weight Together", Columbia University, September 10, 2014

Sulkowicz devised Mattress Performance (Carry That Weight) in the summer of 2014 as a senior thesis while at Yale University Summer School of Art and Music. Her first effort was a video of herself moving a bed out of a room, accompanied by the audio of her filing the police report, which she had recorded on a cellphone. The mattress later became the focus of the piece. Sulkowicz's thesis was supervised by artist Jon Kessler, a professor at Columbia. As the idea for Mattress Performance developed, Kessler and Sulkowicz discussed the nature of endurance art and the work of Tehching Hsieh, Marina Abramović, Ulay and Chris Burden. Sulkowicz described the work as "an endurance performance art piece". Sulkowicz told the Columbia Daily Spectator: "I do think that nowadays art pieces can include whatever the artist desires and in this performance art piece it utilizes the elements of protest ..."

Purchased online from Tall Paul's Tall Mall, the 50-lb (23-kg), dark-blue, extra-long twin mattress is of the kind Columbia places in its dorms, similar to the one on which Sulkowicz said that Nungesser had raped her. Sulkowicz spent the summer of 2014 creating the rules of engagement, which defined the parameters of the project. Written on the walls of her studio in the university's Watson Hall, these included that Sulkowicz had to carry the mattress when on university property; that it had to remain on campus when she was not there; and that she was not allowed to ask for help in carrying it, but could accept if help was offered.

In early September 2014 Sulkowicz began carrying the mattress on campus. A homeless man was one of the first to help. Sulkowicz told New York magazine: "He was the first person who helped without some sort of preconstructed belief for why they were going to help. He was like, 'Oh, look, a struggling girl—let me help her and be a nice human being.' That was probably the most honest interaction I had." The piece was conducted as a senior thesis of her visual arts degree at the school. Sulkowicz kept a diary throughout, amounting to 59,000 words at the end of the work, recording the artist's experiences as well as the misunderstandings of commentators.

Sulkowicz said the work would end when Nungesser was expelled from or otherwise left Columbia, and that she would take the mattress to her graduation ceremony if necessary. In the end Sulkowicz carried it to the graduation ceremony on May 19, 2015, despite a request from the school that students should not bring "large objects which could interfere with the proceedings". Several women helped carry the mattress on stage. As Sulkowicz approached, university president Lee Bollinger, who had been shaking other graduates' hands, turned away as if to pick something up, and did not shake her hand; the university said this happened because the mattress was in the way. The next day posters appeared in Morningside Heights near the university calling Sulkowicz a "pretty little liar".

After graduation Sulkowicz said she had known the university would not expel Nungesser, and had expected to carry the mattress for nine months, the length of a pregnancy, which was an important part of the work: "To me, the piece has very much represented [the fact that] a guy did a horrible thing to me and I tried to make something beautiful out of it."

== Reception ==
=== Reaction by the accused ===
Paul Nungesser said in a December 2014 interview with The New York Times that Mattress Performance is not an act of artistic expression, but instead one orchestrated to bully him and force him to leave Columbia. He said that on the National Day of Action, protesters followed him around, carrying mattresses to one of his classes and taking his picture. He also said that he was not permitted to use written communications between himself and the alleged victim as evidence, and expressed disbelief that anyone could believe he was guilty even after his accusers failed to meet the low burden of proof used in the university hearing process. He also stated that since Sulkowicz's protest serves as her senior thesis, it is being supervised and implicitly endorsed by a Columbia faculty member.

Nungesser's parents criticized the university, including its decision to let Sulkowicz take the mattress to the graduation ceremony: "This has been a deeply humiliating experience. ... A university that bows to a public witch-hunt no longer deserves to be called a place of enlightenment, of intellectual and academic freedom." Asked by German Süddeutsche Zeitung Magazin about her feelings on the treatment of her son at Columbia, Nungesser's mother said, "This is a feeling of lawlessness." His father said that he sometimes fears his son will leave the school as a "cynic" and a "suspicious man".

In April 2015 Nungesser filed a Title IX lawsuit against Columbia University, its trustees, university president Lee Bollinger, and Sulkowicz's senior-thesis supervisor, Jon Kessler, alleging they exposed him to gender-based harassment and a hostile educational environment in allowing the project to go forward. Nungesser said that in so doing they damaged his college experience, emotional well-being, reputation and career prospects. His lawyers argued that Columbia allowed Sulkowicz to create and propose "performances depicting [the plaintiff] as a rapist" even though the university cleared him of any wrongdoing. Among examples of what they described as "public harassment", they cited Sulkowicz's public display of drawings which the lawyers said depicted Nungesser's genitals as part of the project (Sulkowicz left open the question of whether these drawings were of him or stories about him), as well as depictions of the alleged sexual assault, as violations of Columbia's gender-based misconduct policy, which prohibits "unwelcome remarks about the private parts of a person's body" and "graffiti concerning the sexual activity of another person". The lawsuit alleged that Columbia was responsible because the university sponsored and supervised the project. The university's lawyers say the university is "not responsible or liable" for Sulkowicz's conduct.

On August 28, 2015, Columbia's lawyers asked that the case be dismissed, citing First Amendment protections and arguing that Nungesser's lawsuit suggests Columbia was obligated to prevent Sulkowicz from speaking publicly on an important issue. The case was heard by Judge Gregory H. Woods of the United States District Court for the Southern District of New York, who dismissed the suit on March 12, 2016. Nungesser filed an amended complaint on April 25, 2016. In July 2017, the university announced that it had reached a settlement with him; terms of the settlement were not disclosed. The university said in a statement: "Columbia recognizes that after the conclusion of the investigation, Paul's remaining time at Columbia became very difficult for him and not what Columbia would want any of its students to experience. Columbia will continue to review and update its policies toward ensuring that every student—accuser and accused, including those like Paul who are found not responsible—is treated respectfully and as a full member of the Columbia community."

=== Other responses ===
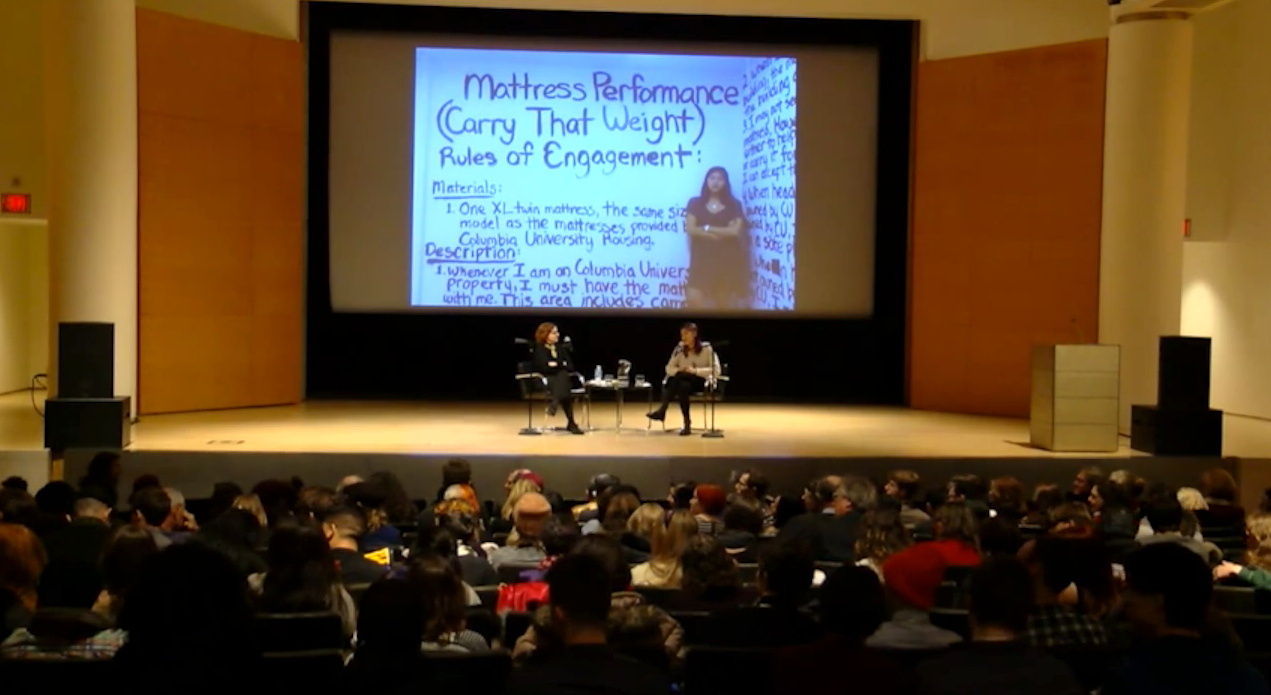
Roberta Smith, New York Times art critic (left), discussing Mattress Performance with Sulkowicz, Brooklyn Museum, December 14, 2014

==== Praise ====
Numerous art critics responded positively to Mattress Performance. Artnet cited it as "almost certainly ... one of the most important artworks of the year", comparing it to Ana Mendieta's Untitled (Rape Scene) (1973) and Suzanne Lacy and Leslie Labowitz-Starus's Three Weeks in May (1977). Journalist Emily Bazelon of The New York Times Magazine described the work and events surrounding it as "a triumph" for the survivor movement and "a nightmare" for the accused. Performance artist Marina Abramović praised it. The New York Times art critic Roberta Smith described it as "strict and lean, yet inclusive and open ended, symbolically laden yet drastically physical", writing that comparisons to the Stations of the Cross and Hester Prynne's scarlet letter were apparent. Jerry Saltz, art critic for New York magazine, included it in his list of the best 19 art shows of 2014, calling "clear, to the point, insistent, adamant ... pure radical vulnerability".

The political response was marked too. Nato Thompson, chief curator of Creative Time, said he could not think of another case where art had triggered a movement in the way Mattress Performance had. Hillary Clinton told the DNC Women's Leadership Forum in September 2014: "That image should haunt all of us ..." In October 2014, Columbia students carried 28 mattresses on campus, one for each student who joined the federal Title IX complaint, then left them outside the home of university president Lee Bollinger; they were fined $471 for the clean-up. A group called "Carry That Weight" organized a "National Day of Action to Carry That Weight" on October 29, 2014, during which students carried mattresses on 130 US campuses and several elsewhere. Sulkowicz received the National Organization for Women's Susan B. Anthony Award and the Feminist Majority Foundation's Ms. Wonder Award.

In January 2015, New York's U.S. senator Kirsten Gillibrand invited Sulkowicz to attend the 2015 State of the Union Address. Families Advocating for Campus Equality said the invitation was "undeserved and violates the principles of confidentiality and gender equality of Title IX", and that Sulkowicz had "failed to establish any wrongdoing" on the part of Nungesser.

In 2015, Sulkowicz was included in The Forward's Forward 50 as one of the year's fifty most influential Jewish-Americans.

==== Criticism ====
Some commentators, mostly from the political right, questioned Sulkowicz's account of the assault and argued that the performance was unfair to Nungesser. Social critic Camille Paglia described Mattress Performance as "a parody of the worst aspects of that kind of grievance-oriented feminism", adding that a feminist work "should empower women, not cripple them".

In an editorial in the New York Post, Naomi Schaefer Riley criticized Sulkowicz's work as "shaming without proof" and accused Sulkowicz and her supporters of "saving themselves from having to answer any questions and destroying men's lives with lies and innuendo". In his article "If anything's art, art's nothing", National Post columnist Robert Fulford compared Sulkowicz's work to that of Megumi Igarashi and concluded, "if everything is art, then art can be used for anything. And in the process meaning and value dissolve and art becomes hopelessly debased."

In an editorial for The Federalist, columnist Mona Charen stated that she believed Sulkowicz was likely "shading the truth" and argued that, while campus rape was a real problem, advocates did not pay enough attention to the possibility of false allegations.

== See also ==
- Columbia University rape controversy
- Empathy and Prostitution
