= Ted Lawson =

American contemporary artist

- Born: 1970 (age 55–56); U.S.
- Known for: Labyrinth sculptures, CNC machine artwork, blood-infused drawings
- Notable work: "Ghost In The Machine", "Ceci N'est Pas Un Viol", large-scale sculptures

Ted Lawson (born 1970) is an American contemporary artist.

== Work ==
Critic Christian Viveros-Fauné, in describing Lawson's recent labyrinth sculptures, said: "The similarities between circuit boards and computer engineering diagrams, among other blueprints for knowledge, take new form in Lawson's mazes, dovetailing neatly with murky yet popular metaphors for information exchange: data clouds, neural nets, global webs, and other numinous and hyper-connective metaphors. With these analogues in mind, Lawson has developed algorithms to shape and carve his wall-mounted mazes. The fact that he ultimately cedes authorship to the CNC machine to manufacture each object underscores a crucial point. All systems of knowledge, his work suggests, contain dead ends and cul-de-sacs, especially once these have been fundamentally instrumentalized. As the media-studies guru Marshall McLuhan put it twenty-six years before the internet: 'When you give people too much information, they resort to pattern recognition.'" Dystopian Geometries: The Art of Ted Lawson

In 2011, he started a large-scale sculpture commissioned by Napster and Facebook founder Sean Parker. The piece was finished and installed in Parker's home in 2014.

Lawson owns Prototype New York, an art fabrication studio, which has created works for Ghada Amer, Mariko Mori, Jeff Koons, Terence Koh and Yoko Ono.

== Ghost In The Machine ==
In 2014, Lawson began working on a series of drawings using his own blood fed into a modified CNC machine. The initial drawing, a life size self-portrait called Ghost In The Machine, went viral after a video of the process was picked up and shared by Huffington Post, Juxtapoz Magazine, and many more.

According to the Huffington Post:

For the life-sized piece, titled Ghost In The Machine, Lawson wrote thousands of lines of code directing a CNC machine to draft his portrait, thus merging manufacturing and artistic processes. He then hooked himself up to a robotic arm intravenously, and spent hours literally pouring his blood into the work. The visceral piece, a collaborative effort between man and machine, challenges those who consider digital or mechanical art to be more removed than traditional fine art fields like painting and drawing.

== Ceci N'est Pas Un Viol ==
In 2015 Lawson directed Ceci N'est Pas Un Viol, a video conceived by performance artist Emma Sulkowicz. The work explores the boundaries between consensual and non-consensual sex.

== Exhibitions ==
=== 2013 ===
- Crude, Emmanuel Fremin Gallery, NYC

=== 2012 ===
- Entropy, Emmanuel Fremin Gallery, NYC

== Bibliography ==
- Stinson, Liz (September 4, 2014). "This Artist Had a Robot Print His Selfie With Ink Made From His Blood". Wired.
- Chris Plante, "Human paints nude self-portrait with own blood and a humorless robot", Verge Magazine, 2014
- Priscilla Frank, "And Here Is The Selfie Made Out Of Blood You've (Maybe) Been Waiting For (NSFW)", Huffington Post, 2014
