= Lee Bollinger =

American attorney and educator (born 1946)

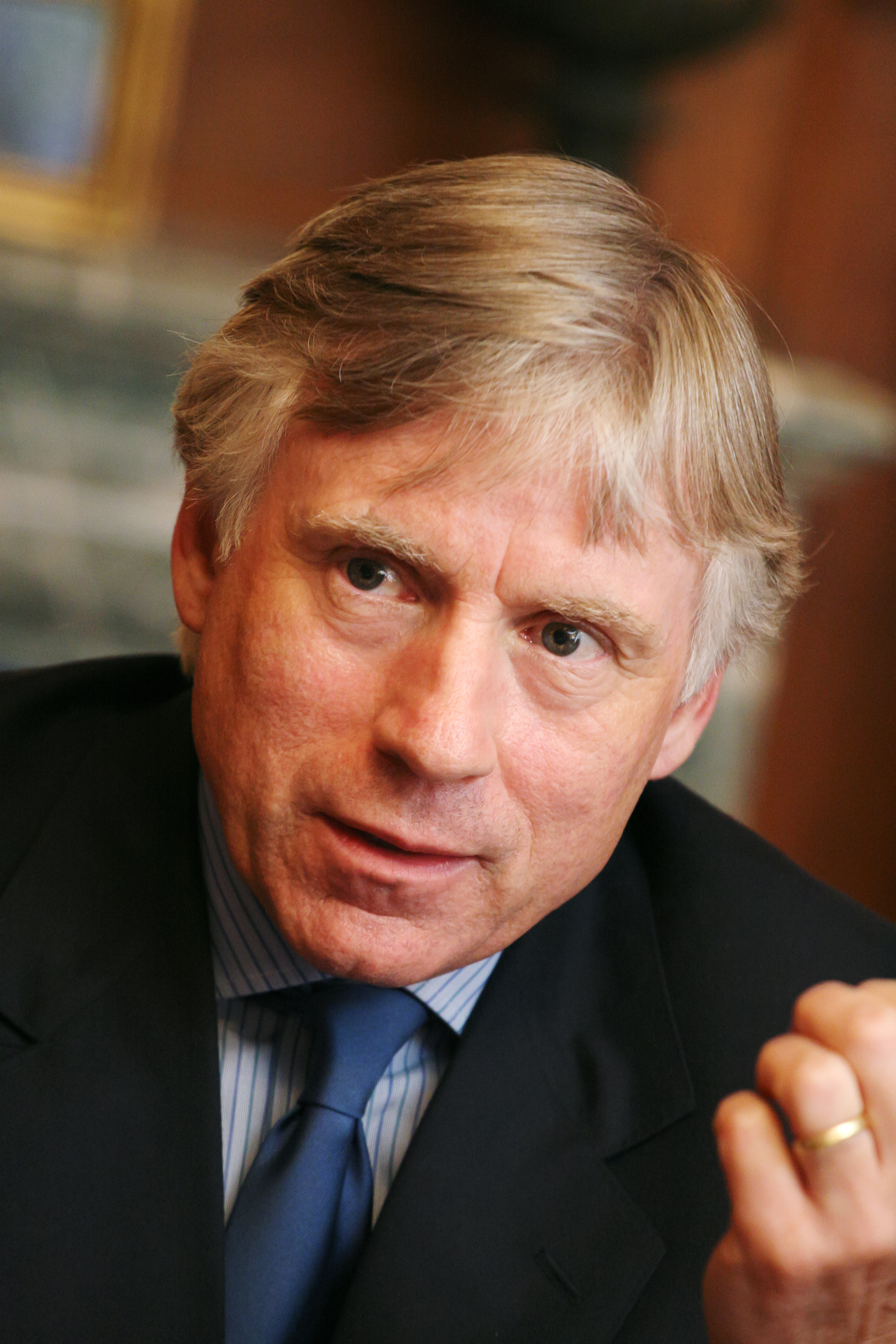
- Bollinger in 2007

19th President of Columbia University
- In office June 1, 2002 – June 30, 2023
- Preceded by: George Erik Rupp
- Succeeded by: Minouche Shafik

12th President of the University of Michigan
- In office February 1, 1997 – December 31, 2001
- Preceded by: James J. Duderstadt
- Succeeded by: Mary Sue Coleman

14th Dean of University of Michigan Law School
- In office 1987–1994
- Preceded by: Terrance Sandalow
- Succeeded by: Jeffrey S. Lehman

Personal details
- Born: Lee Carroll Bollinger; April 30, 1946 (age 80) Santa Rosa, California, U.S.
- Education: University of Oregon (BS); Columbia University (JD)
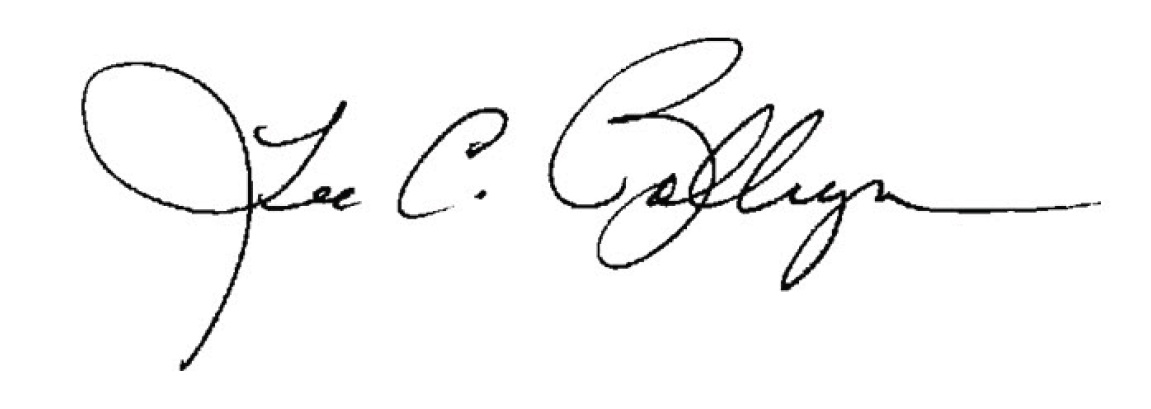
- Signature

Lee Carroll Bollinger (born April 30, 1946) is an American attorney and academic administrator who served as the 19th president of Columbia University from 2002 to 2023, as the 12th president of the University of Michigan from 1997 to 2001, and as 14th dean of the University of Michigan Law School from 1987 to 1994.

Bollinger is currently the Seth Low Professor and a faculty member at Columbia Law School. He is a legal scholar of the First Amendment and freedom of speech. While serving as President of the University of Michigan, he was at the center of two notable United States Supreme Court cases regarding the use of affirmative action in admissions processes. He also served as chair of the Federal Reserve Bank of New York board of directors in 2011, and was a member of the board from 2006 to 2012.

== Early life and education ==
Bollinger was born in Santa Rosa, California, the son of Patricia Mary and Lee C. Bollinger. He was raised in Santa Rosa, California, and Baker City, Oregon.

In 1963, Bollinger spent a year as an exchange student in Brazil with AFS Intercultural Programs. He received a Bachelor of Science with a major in political science from the University of Oregon in 1968, where he graduated Phi Beta Kappa and was a brother in Theta Chi fraternity. He received a Juris Doctor from Columbia Law School in New York City in 1971.

== Career ==
In 1971 and 1972, Bollinger served as a law clerk to Judge Wilfred Feinberg of the United States Court of Appeals for the Second Circuit. In 1972 and 1973, he was a law clerk to Chief Justice Warren Burger of the Supreme Court of the United States.

In 1973, Bollinger joined the faculty of the University of Michigan Law School, becoming a full professor in 1979, and dean of the school in 1987.

In 1994, he was appointed provost of Dartmouth College, before returning to the University of Michigan, where he served as 12th president from February 1, 1997, to December 31, 2001.

=== Columbia University president ===
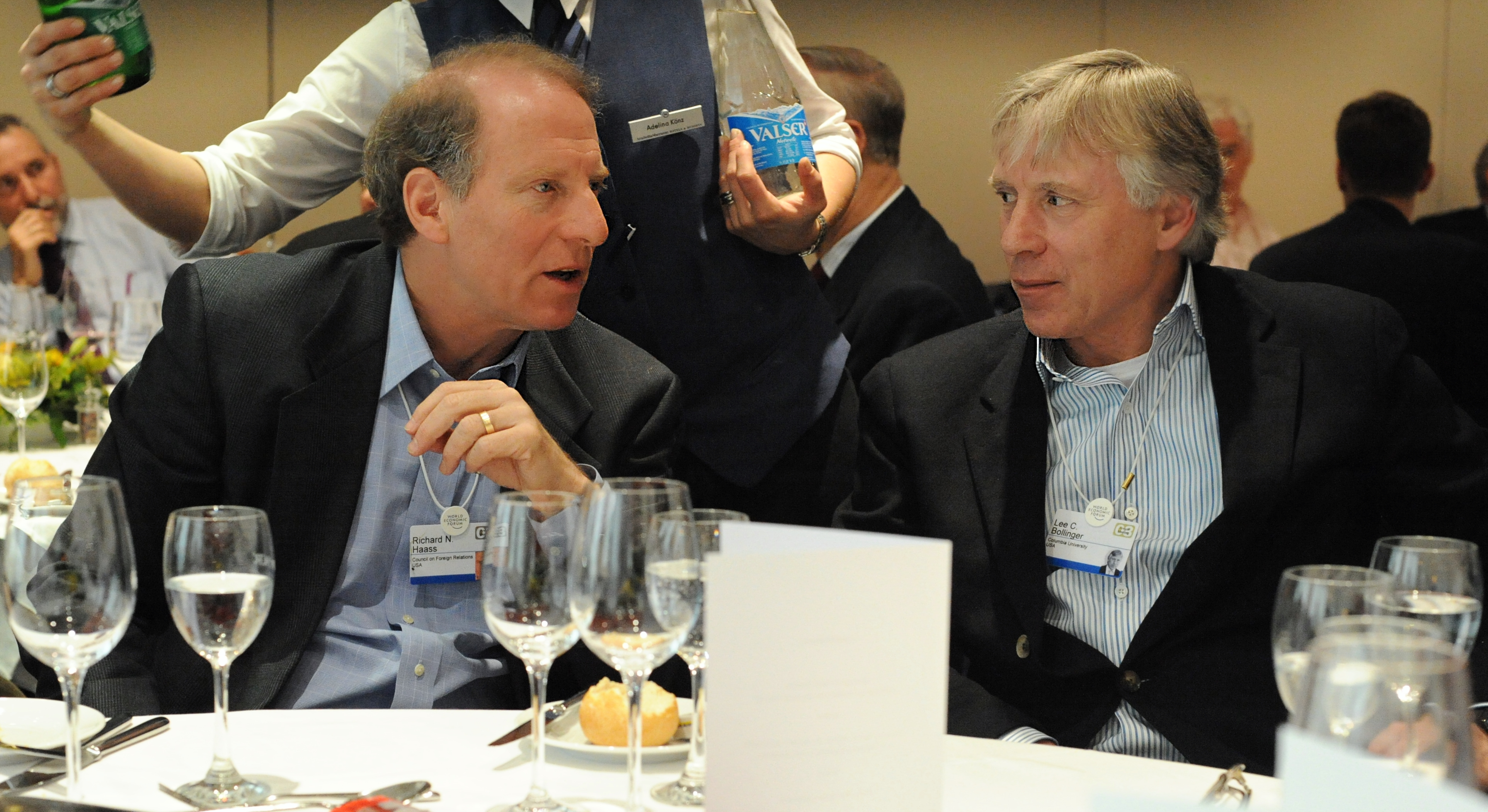
Bollinger (right) and Council on Foreign Relations president Richard N. Haass in 2008

Bollinger assumed his position as president of Columbia University in June 2002.

In 2003, Bollinger was a named defendant representing the University of Michigan in the Supreme Court cases Grutter v. Bollinger and Gratz v. Bollinger. In the Grutter case, the Court found by a 5–4 margin that the affirmative action policies of the University of Michigan Law School were constitutional. But at the same time, it found by a 6–3 margin in the Gratz case that the undergraduate admissions policies of Michigan were not narrowly tailored to a compelling interest in diversity and 20 predetermined points are awarded to underrepresented minorities, and thus that they violated the Equal Protection Clause of the Fourteenth Amendment.

In 2004, he was elected to the American Philosophical Society.

Bollinger lived in the Columbia President's House from February 2004 until the end of his tenure as president, after the building underwent a $23 million renovation.

In November 2006, Bollinger was elected to the Board of Directors of the Federal Reserve Bank of New York, a term lasting for three years.

On October 19, 2010, the Board of Trustees announced through a university-wide email that Bollinger had agreed to continue as president for at least the next five years.

Bollinger was the subject of criticism for his role in advocating the expansion of the university into the Manhattanville neighborhood and the use of eminent domain to help it seize property there. The Bollinger administration's expansion plans were criticized as fundamentally incompatible with the 197/a plan for development crafted by the community, and for failing to address the neighborhood's need to maintain affordable housing stock.

Bollinger attempted to expand the international scope of the university, took frequent trips abroad and invited world leaders to its campus. Bollinger was criticized for taking a neutral public position on controversies regarding the Middle East Languages and Cultures (MEALAC) department.

In 2013, Bollinger's total compensation was $4.6 million, making him the highest paid private college president in the United States.

In 2015, Bollinger did not shake Emma Sulkowicz's hand during the degree conferring portion of the ceremony, as he had with the other students. Sulkowicz was the accuser in the Columbia University rape accusation controversy, which lead her to create her art piece, Mattress Performance (Carry That Weight), a piece that continued up to and including her graduation ceremony. A spokeswoman for the University said that the snub had not been intended.

At a January 2021 rally during a student tuition strike protesting the university's tuition rates, Young Democratic Socialists of America organizers cited as further evidence of alleged inequitable allocation of university resources the fact that Bollinger's salary had been frozen that year, while Barnard College administration's salaries had been cut, including by 20 percent in the case of Sian Beilock, Barnard College's president.

In February 2022, the Columbia Daily Spectator reported that Bollinger had purchased an Upper West Side apartment for $11.7 million. In 2008, his salary was $1.7 million.

Bollinger's residence was the site of demonstrations in which his high salary was criticized as an example of the university's "inequitable allocation of resources."

==== World Leaders Forum ====
Columbia invited Iranian President Mahmoud Ahmadinejad to speak at the World Leaders Forum on September 24, 2007. A number of local and national politicians denounced Columbia for hosting Ahmadinejad.

Bollinger described the event as part of "Columbia's long-standing tradition of serving as a major forum for robust debate, especially on global issues." Bollinger released a statement outlining his introduction, explaining to the student body that the free speech afforded to Ahmadinejad was for the sake of the students and the faculty rather than for the benefit of Ahmadinejad himself, whom Bollinger referred to as "exhibiting all the signs of a petty and cruel dictator."

Bollinger was criticized by students at Columbia's School of International and Public Affairs, but praised by Bob Kerrey who said that Bollinger "turned what could have been an embarrassment for higher education into something quite positive."

=== Federal Reserve Bank of New York ===
In July 2010, he was appointed chair of the Federal Reserve Bank of New York board of directors for 2011. Previously, he had served as deputy chair.

=== Retirement ===
On April 14, 2022, Bollinger announced in an email to the Columbia student body that he would be retiring from his role as president effective June 30, 2023. In January 2023, Columbia announced that Minouche Shafik, president of the London School of Economics, would succeed him as president of the university.

== Personal life ==
Bollinger is married to artist Jean Magnano Bollinger. They have a son and a daughter and five grandchildren. Bollinger's family is Catholic.

== Books ==
In addition to his academic and administrative positions, Bollinger has written many articles and books on the subject of free speech.

- The Tolerant Society: Freedom of Speech and Extremist Speech in America (Oxford University Press, 1986) ISBN 0-19-504000-7
- Images of a Free Press (University of Chicago Press, 1991) ISBN 0-226-06349-6
- Eternally Vigilant: Free Speech in the Modern Era (University Of Chicago Press, 2002) ISBN 0-226-06353-4
- Uninhibited, Robust, and Wide-Open: A Free Press for a New Century (Oxford University Press, 2010) ISBN 978-0-19-530439-8
- The Free Speech Century (Oxford University Press, 2018) ISBN 978-0-19-084138-6
- Regardless of Frontiers: Global Freedom of Expression in a Troubled World (Columbia University Press, 2021) ISBN 978-0-23-119699-4
- National Security, Leaks and Freedom of the Press: The Pentagon Papers Fifty Years On (Oxford University Press, 2021) ISBN 978-0-19-751939-4
- Social Media, Freedom of Speech, and the Future of our Democracy (Oxford University Press, 2022) ISBN 978-0-19-762109-7
- A Legacy of Discrimination: The Essential Constitutionality of Affirmative Action (Oxford University Press, 2023) ISBN 978-0-19-768574-7

== See also ==
- List of law clerks for the chief justice of the United States
- Notable AFS exchange students

Academic offices
Preceded by Terrance Sandalow	Dean of the University of Michigan Law School; 1987–1994	Succeeded by Jeffrey S. Lehman
Preceded by Bruce Pipes	Provost of Dartmouth College; 1994–1996	Succeeded by James Wright
Preceded by Homer A. Neal (interim); James Johnson Duderstadt	12th President of the University of Michigan; 1996–2002	Succeeded by B. Joseph White (interim); Mary Sue Coleman
Preceded by George Erik Rupp	19th President of Columbia University; 2002–2023	Succeeded by Minouche Shafik
