= Carlson Baker Arts =

American art fabrication and engineering firm

- Industry: Art fabrication
- Founded: Los Angeles, California, United States (1971)
- Founder: Peter Carlson
- Headquarters: Sun Valley, California, United States
- Area served: International
- Key people: Peter Carlson, John Baker, Diana Campbell
- Services: Art fabrication, Engineering, Design development
- Owners: Peter Carlson, John Baker
- Website: Carlson Baker Arts

Carlson Baker Arts was an American company that provided custom fabrication and engineering services to artists, architectural firms and commercial companies. Based in Sun Valley, California, the company is most known for its work for artists such as Ellsworth Kelly, Jeff Koons, Christian Moeller, Isamu Noguchi, and Claes Oldenburg / Coosje van Bruggen, among others. The firm was founded by Peter Carlson in 1971, and has been headed by Carlson and John Baker as partners since mid-2010. Fabricators like Carlson Baker assist in producing technically challenging, large-scale industrial, labor-intensive, or otherwise complex artworks beyond the capacities of artists and companies. Their technical services may range from 3D scanning and modeling to advanced machining, milling, and finishing to assembly, shipping, and installation.

Art writers describe the company as one of the field's pioneering and leading fabricators; in 2007, when Artforum gathered a roundtable to discuss the history and growth of art fabrication, it included Carlson and his partner of the time, Ed Suman, as leaders who had "helped realize some of the most technologically ambitious artworks" of the time. Art historian Michelle Kuo described the company as embodying "a growing convergence of artisanal craft, the factory model of production, and the organizational services and informatics that bind these elements together." Specific projects that Carlson Baker has fabricated include: Koons's Balloon Dog series (1996–2010); public sculptures by Oldenburg and van Bruggen (Typewriter Eraser – Scale X, 1999), Moeller (Verdi, 2012), and Tony Tasset (Rainbow, 2012); and Kelly's "Panel" and "Totem" series.

== Development of art fabrication ==
Contemporary art fabrication emerged amid the Pop and Conceptual art movements of the 1960s, as artists pursued ambitiously scaled and technical projects more concerned with ideas and concepts than with demonstrating conventional skills associated with the individual "artist's hand." The practice was originally taken up by East Coast industrial manufacturers, such as high-end furniture producer Treitel-Gratz Co. and architectural fabricator Milgo Industrial, which offered artists access to industrial tools, materials and techniques. They were soon joined by two companies solely dedicated to art fabrication: New York-based Lippincott Inc. and Los Angeles-based print workshop Gemini G.E.L. These firms offered a greater degree of collaboration to artists such as Donald Judd, Sol LeWitt, Louise Nevelson, Barnett Newman, and Frank Stella. When Gemini employee Peter Carlson left to found his own firm in 1971, it became the third such company.

Michelle Kuo suggests that in the decades that followed fabricators such as Carlson moved beyond industrial metallurgy and plastics to increasingly serve as conduits between artists and industry and technology, expanding the scope and complexity of the field. This included researching and solving new engineering and organizational problems with both new, patent-worthy and discarded technologies that drew on the aerospace, automotive, defense, recreation, semiconductor and entertainment industries. In time, these practices have come to include computer-assisted design development, 3D scanning and modeling, CNC milling, water-jet cutting, advanced paint and surface finishing, machining and moulding, as well as project management, shipping, installation and conservation.

== Company history and partners ==
Peter Carlson (born 1949) began his studies at Los Angeles Valley College in the late 1960s in electrical engineering. He switched to fine arts and while still in school started working at Gemini G.E.L., producing multiples (limited editions of sculpture) for artists, such as Robert Rauschenberg, Claes Oldenburg, Ellsworth Kelly and Edward Kienholz. He did research and work on Oldenburg's vacuum-moulded polyurethane relief, Profile Airflow (1968) and attended the landmark LACMA exhibition, "Art & Technology"—experiences Carlson identifies as a catalyst to the development of his practice. When Gemini stopped doing multiples in-house, Carlson fabricated sculpture in his garage independently, for artists such as Rauschenberg, Kienholz and Isamu Noguchi. In 1971, he founded Peter M. Carlson Enterprises (later Carlson & Company) in Los Angeles.

Carlson departed from his predecessors somewhat, considering the firm's role as that of problem solver rather than creative "partner": "I compare my relationship with the artist as similar to that between an architect and a contractor. The artist has a vision of what they want the finished sculpture to look like, and I do what it takes to complete that vision. I serve as a tool for them." Writers identify this process less with specific technical solutions than with assembling suitable teams, tools and methods—some state-of-the-art and some old-fashioned—for each project. Often, this involves extensive research and testing and the development of new processes (for example, in finishing and paint adhesion), as with Carlson's work to achieve a specific industrial look and feel for Noguchi's galvanized steel sculptures in the 1980s and the flawless surfaces of Jeff Koons's work in subsequent decades.

In 1990, Carlson & Co. and its staff of roughly 30 engineers, technicians, and machinists (many former defense workers) moved to a 20,000-square-foot plant in Sun Valley, turning out about 100 projects per year. Shortly after, it added Diana Campbell (still with the company as Director of Administration), Mark Nelson, as a partner, and Ed Suman, who would become a partner in 2003. Writers suggest the company separated itself from competitors in the 1990s—expanding to about 90 employees and a 30,000 square-foot facility—by introducing increasingly advanced technologies that pushed the limits of what was possible and evolved as artists continually sought to break new ground. To meet these demands, the company forged service and sourcing relationships across diverse industries, developing new methods and technologies. According to artist John McCracken, the firm invented "new tools and processes" in order to accomplish what he wanted in his stainless-steel and bronze sculptures: "I had for many years wished for the capability to make such things, and Carlson has immeasurably helped to bring that about."

In 2003, John Baker (born 1960) joined the company as Project Manager; he has led projects for Christian Moeller, Tony Tasset and Catherine Wagner, among others. Baker previously worked as an architect at Richard Meier & Partners Architects, where he was Project Manager on the East Building of the Getty Center (1997) and led teams for the design and construction of Gagosian Gallery Beverly Hills (1998) and the Malibu Beach House (2001). In April 2010, in the midst of a recession, a slumping contemporary art market and rising costs associated with increasingly ambitious projects, Carlson & Company briefly closed, filing what Carlson characterized as "something akin to bankruptcy." The firm re-formed in May 2010 as Carlson Arts LLC, adopting a downsized, reconceived business model with Carlson and Baker heading the firm as partners. In 2019, the firm became Carlson Baker Arts.

== Notable projects and clients ==
Carlson Baker has produced works for notable contemporary artists throughout its history, including Doug Aitken, Lita Albuquerque, Jim Isermann, Ellsworth Kelly, Jeff Koons, Liz Larner, Rob Ley, John McCracken, Christian Moeller, Yoshitomo Nara, Isamu Noguchi, Claes Oldenburg / Coosje van Bruggen, Ken Price, Charles Ray, Nobuo Sekine, Tony Tasset, Robert Therrien, and Catherine Wagner, among others. The firm has also fabricated projects for design, architectural and commercial firms, such as Disney, Sussman/Prejza & Co., Pei Cobb Freed & Partners, H+M, and Sofitel, and for institutions such as the Getty Center and Simon Wiesenthal Center.

=== Ellsworth Kelly ===
Carlson Baker worked with Ellsworth Kelly for over 40 years producing freestanding sculptures and wall reliefs across a range of materials, scales and his signature motifs. Kelly has said that Carlson stood out from other fabricators because of his ingenuity: “He’s very inventive. He understands what's needed. That's a unique gift, to translate an idea an artist has into something tangible." The company fabricated Kelly's rectangular painted aluminum and stainless steel "Panels" and his "Totems" in bronze, mahogany, redwood and steel; specific works include: Untitled (EK920, 2004), two large, multi-panel reliefs at the American Embassy in Beijing, China; the 40-foot, zig-zagging, stainless steel Barnes Totem (2011) in Philadelphia; the "folded", ribbon-like outdoor work, Untitled (EK1026, 2012); and Blue Black (2000, Pulitzer Foundation for the Arts). The company also produced Kelly's aluminum and wood "Curve" reliefs, public sculptures such as Two Curves and White Curves (both 2001), and his rounded, irregular aluminum wall pieces, Black Form 1 (2011) and White Form 1 (2012).

Carlson Baker oversaw the fabrication of two interior sculptural elements for Kelly‘s first-ever building, titled Austin (2018), sited at the Blanton Museum of Art at the University of Texas at Austin. The works include a redwood "Totem" sourced from northern California and fourteen abstract black and white marble panels, designed by Kelly as an interpretations of the stations of the cross, whose imported Greek and Italian surfaces Carlson described as having the "translucency of flesh."

=== Jeff Koons ===
Carlson Baker fabricated some of Jeff Koons's most visible projects of the 1990s and 2000s, including his long-running "Celebration" series (1994–2010) of small and gigantic sculptures based on children’s toys. The company spent years perfecting an "optically perfect mirror polish finish" for stainless steel, which became a hallmark of Koons's candy-colored, 12-foot Balloon Dog (1994–2000) and 11-foot Moon (1995–2000) series based on Mylar balloons. The first "Balloon Dog" took the company more than four years to produce because technologies for creating the mirror-like finish and bright colors on stainless steel did not exist; a further challenge came in creating a smooth, flawless, rounded contour in the welding of the piece's 60 parts. The firm also fabricated Koons's aluminum and stainless steel wall reliefs, Donkey and Kangaroo (both 1999), and the moulded polyethylene works, Bowl with Eggs (1994–2008) and Cat on a Clothesline (1994–2001), among others.

=== Christian Moeller ===
Christian Moeller has employed Carlson Baker to produce several public projects, including several of his bright, whimsical, kinetic works (Mojo, 2007; Lola 2015; Bobble, 2017) and five of his "pointillist"-styled pieces (2006–18) using moulded plastic chips in chain link fencing or wood panels to form large-scale mural-like images. The most recent was the 42-foot tall Buttons (2018), which covers the outer face of an entire parking structure in Olympia, Washington. The company produced Moeller's 65-foot column, Verdi (2012), made with 4,000 recycled San Pelegrino water bottles; the work references recycling, environmentalism and community water towers, and encases an industrial stack at the Brightwater municipal water treatment station in Bothell, Washington.

=== Claes Oldenburg & Coosje van Bruggen ===
Carlson began working with Claes Oldenburg and Coosje van Bruggen in the late 1960s; the firm has fabricated their colossal monuments to common objects since the 1980s. Major works include: Knife Slicing Through Wall (1989); the 21-foot Pin (Red) and Pin (Blue) (1999); Big Sweep (2006, Denver Art Museum), a 45-foot stainless-steel broom pushing two wads of paper into a 30-foot dustpan; and the 19-foot Typewriter Eraser – Scale X (1999, The National Gallery of Art, Washington, DC).

=== Chain Reaction ===
Carlson Baker fabricated Chain Reaction (1991), a 26-foot tall public sculpture resembling tangled chains in the shape of a mushroom cloud, designed by Pulitzer Prize-winning Los Angeles Times editorial cartoonist Paul Conrad. Its chain effect was created by welding 38,000 hollow brass, J-shaped plumbing pipes, which were screwed and wired to fiberglass covering a steel frame. Funded by philanthropist Joan Kroc and dedicated on World Peace Day 1992, the work is intended as a peace monument and warning against nuclear war and has become a landmark outside the Santa Monica Civic Center.

=== Other notable projects ===
Peter Carlson worked with Isamu Noguchi on several works and projects in the 1980s, including his painted aluminum and galvanized steel sculptures (e.g., Table and Chair (Pierced Table) and Zazen, both 1983) and California Scenario Garden (1980–2) in Costa Mesa. In the 2000s, the company fabricated several of John McCracken's signature stainless steel and bronze "Plank" and obelisk sculptures (e.g., Bright, 2006; Mordant, 2007; and Gleam, 2006), works polished to such reflectivity that critics describe them as translucent and camouflaged to near-invisibility in their echoing of surrounding environments. The firm also produced Charles Ray’s 18-ton, solid-steel replica of a mass-produced 1950s toy, Father Figure (2007), and between 2003 and 2010, Robert Therrien’s oversized kitchenware, chairs, and table.

In 2012, Carlson Baker completed fabrication and installation of Tony Tasset's monumental Rainbow (2012), a 94-foot tall, 188-foot long permanent sculpture commissioned by Sony Pictures Entertainment in Culver City, California. Its steel truss sections, clad in an aluminum skin painted with a spectrum of colors, were assembled at the studio lot and hoisted into place by two cranes during a 19 ½-hour setup and installation process. The company also fabricated Rob Ley's indoor, 294-foot by 25-foot relief, Field Lines (2018), installed at the O’Hare Airport Transportation Hub in Chicago; constructed from over 4,000 pieces of formed powder coated aluminum, the permanent work represents a static interpretation of wind and its intrinsic connection to flight, energy and motion.
