= Families Advocating for Campus Equality =

American advocacy group

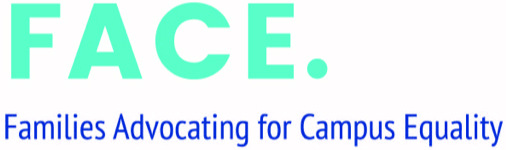
- Founded: 2014; 12 years ago
- Founder: Sherry Warner Seefeld; Allison Strange
- Key people: Cynthia Garrett (Co-President)
- Website: www.facecampusequality.org

Families Advocating for Campus Equality (FACE) is an American advocacy group whose stated goal is to ensure fairness and due process for all parties involved in allegations of sexual misconduct on college and university campuses. FACE was started by Sherry Warner Seefeld and two other mothers who say their sons were falsely accused of sexual misconduct on their college campuses.

== History ==
Cynthia P. Garrett, an attorney, is currently the co-president of FACE, which has expanded rapidly over the last few years as awareness of campus Title IX issues has become more well publicized.

== Issues ==
Specifically, FACE objects to many schools' Title IX proceedings that deny students basic procedures traditionally provided to those defending themselves against allegations of wrongdoing, such as: not being informed of the specific accusations, denied access to the complaint, witness statements, and evidence, and not being permitted to contact and present witnesses. FACE and others who support more protections for accused students say these procedures were denied students due to the Department of Education's "civil-rights office and its aggressive enforcement of Title IX and victims' rights during the Obama years." "Critics say the guidance went too far and effectively directed colleges to tilt their processes in favor of victims, trampling on the rights of accused students."

Seefeld, FACE's first president, acknowledges the problem of sexual assault on college campuses, but says "Even if a small percentage of rape reports are given falsely, it's not OK to throw away one person's life". Seefeld's son, Caleb Warner, was accused in January 2010 of sexually assaulting a fellow University of North Dakota student. He was initially suspended from the university, but the sanction was later lifted after a warrant was issued for his accuser for her arrest for making a false report to law enforcement.

According to FACE board member and attorney Eric Rosenberg, who has represented numerous accused students, "'There has been a massive fear on campuses of OCR' ... Now, he said, 'the voice of the falsely accused is beginning to be heard in ways that were not previously available to them.'"

== Advocacy ==
FACE has become involved in educating state and federal legislators about the need for improvement in the way campuses respond to allegations of sexual harassment and misconduct. "In a very short time, FACE has come a very long way as an advocacy organization for students accused of sexual misconduct on campus. Beginning as a 'mommy org,' it's gained substantial sophistication in dealing with Title IX."

On July 13, 2017, FACE co-president Cynthia Garrett shepherded several students to a meeting in Washington DC with Department of Education Secretary Betsy DeVos. Later, during Secretary DeVos' September 7, 2017 speech at George Mason University, she mentioned the cases of two FACE students with whom she had met. In that speech, DeVos reported, "Since becoming Secretary, I've heard from many students whose lives were impacted by sexual misconduct: students who came to campus to gain knowledge, and who instead lost something sacred." The Secretary declared, "We know this much to be true: one rape is one too many. One assault is one too many. One aggressive act of harassment is one too many. One person denied due process is one too many."

== Positions ==
FACE maintains that the goals of victim protection and equitable processes are not mutually exclusive: "Our goals are not to get rid of Title IX, ... Our goals are not to deny anybody civil rights ... [Nor does FACE] want the civil-rights office to stop enforcing Title IX with respect to campus sexual violence." According to Garrett, "We're looking for a balanced solution and we don't believe the current enforcement, or 'Dear Colleague' letter offers a balanced solution." In another interview, Garrett said, "We want fair procedures. We don't want to take away Title IX."

As an example, Garrett served on an American Bar Association Criminal Justice Section task force which addressed the problem and, along with victims' advocates and campus administrators, was able to reach a consensus on procedures that would protect the interests of all parties. In June 2017, the task force issued its "recommendations to guide colleges and universities". Garrett said FACE is "not looking for a one-sided, make-it-impossible for complainants to have their rights vindicated" approach.

In 2015, FACE criticized Senator Kirsten Gillibrand for inviting Emma Sulkowicz to the State of the Union Address, saying such an honor was "undeserved and violates the principles of confidentiality and gender equality of Title IX, the law that oversees sexual misconduct on campus" and saying that "Sulkowicz failed to establish any wrongdoing by the student she accused after a tribunal, and an appeal at Columbia, as well as an investigation by the New York Police Department." In July 2017 Columbia settled with Nungesser on undisclosed terms.

== See also ==
- A Rape on Campus
- Duke lacrosse case
- Foundation for Individual Rights in Education
