= What Were You Wearing? =

American art exhibition

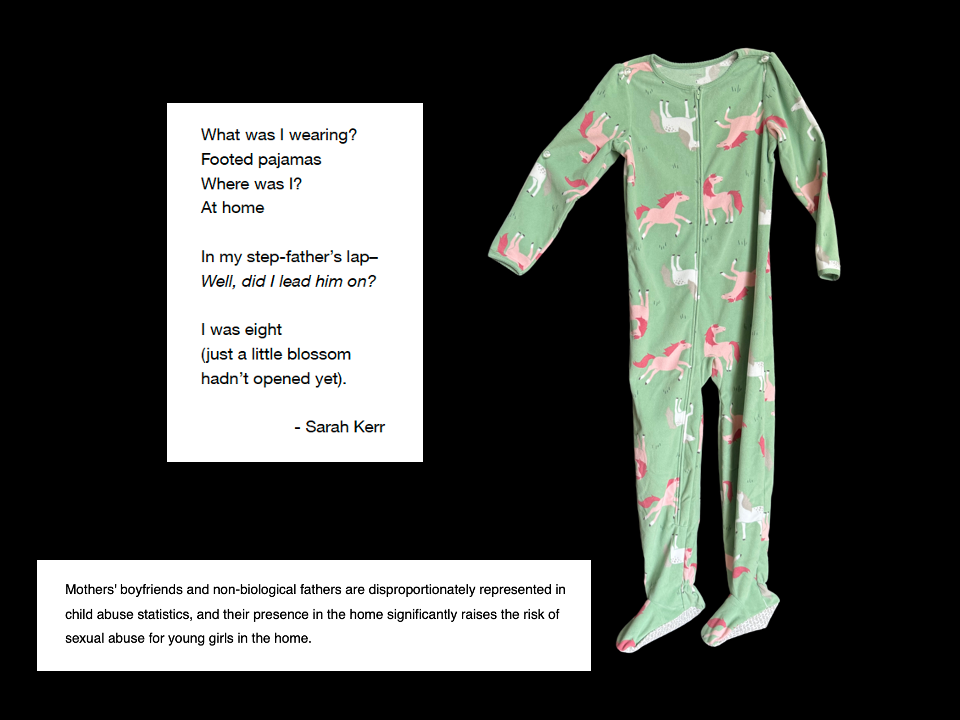
Survivor clothing words and data

What Were You Wearing? is a visual art exhibit created in 2013 by Jen Brockman and Mary Wyandt-Hiebert. It features representations of clothing worn at the time of sexual assaults, paired with brief survivor narratives. The exhibit, which first opened at the University of Arkansas in April 2014, was inspired by the poem What I Was Wearing, written by Mary Simmerling in 2002 and copyrighted in 2005. The poem challenges the enduring tendency to blame victims of sexual violence by drawing attention to the persistent question, "What were you wearing?"

Since its debut, the exhibit has been staged in all 50 U.S. states and in more than 38 countries. The exhibit addresses themes related to public perceptions of clothing and sexual violence, including rape myths that the victim was to blame because of the clothing they wore.

== Inspiration ==
The creators, Jen Brockman and Mary Wyandt-Hiebert, are longtime educators and advocates for survivors of sexual and relationship violence. In May 2013, while attending a training session, they encountered Simmerling’s poem What I Was Wearing. The poem describes Simmerling’s experience of rape in the summer of 1987 and the deeply ingrained memory of what she was wearing that night. It ends with the line, "I remember also what he was wearing that night even though it’s true that no one has ever asked." Moved by the poem’s stark testimony, Brockman and Wyandt-Hiebert began developing a visual response to the question it addresses. They obtained Simmerling’s permission to use her poem that summer, and the first exhibit opened in April 2014 at the University of Arkansas during Sexual Assault Awareness Month.

== Design and intent ==
Wyandt-Hiebert and Brockman began collecting stories from student survivors at the University of Arkansas, inviting them to share what they were wearing at the time of their assaults. As they worked to recreate those outfits, the goal was not to recreate trauma but to reclaim space for survivors and challenge the enduring myths that shield perpetrators and silence victims.

The creators emphasized that the clothes displayed were intentionally ordinary—jeans, sweatshirts, t-shirts, uniforms, dresses—chosen not for shock value but to reveal how unremarkable the clothing often was. As Brockman explained, the aim was to expose the rape myth that changing one’s clothes can prevent sexual assault and to create a space where survivors might recognize themselves in the installation and know they are not alone.

Different experiences of sexual violence are represented, including assaults experienced by people of various ages, genders, backgrounds, and professions. The installation was conceived not just as an educational display but as an act of solidarity with survivors.

== Exhibition and global reach ==
Since 2014, the What Were You Wearing? exhibit has been installed on hundreds of campuses and in communities around the world. By 2024, a mapping project hosted by the University of Kansas recorded over 490 verified installations across six continents. The open-source nature of the exhibit allows for local adaptations while preserving the integrity of its original purpose.

At each site, organizers gather survivor accounts and assemble clothing items that reflect the descriptions shared. For example, at Ohio University in 2018, students helped curate and contribute to the installation. The exhibit has also inspired related projects, including Undressing My Voice, a 2018 collaboration between Nu’Nicka Epps and students at Sam Houston State University.

Reflecting on the legacy of the poem and the exhibits, Simmerling has said:

“When I wrote ‘What I Was Wearing,’ I never imagined it would inspire a global social justice movement in protest against a world that too often accepts sexual violence as inevitable or normative and seeks to blame victims rather than perpetrators. I am deeply grateful to Dr. Mary Wyandt-Hiebert and Jen Brockman for making the dream I had of turning the poem into exhibits for survivors a reality. In their capable hands, the exhibits offer a pathway for visually reclaiming our stories and upending victim-blaming myths that seek to place the blame on survivors rather than perpetrators where it rightly belongs.”
