= Philip Grausman =

American sculptor (born 1935)

Philip Grausman (born July 16, 1935) is an American sculptor, known for his portrait works.

Grausman's work is in the collection of over 30 museums, including the Smithsonian's National Portrait Gallery, Washington, D.C.; Metropolitan Museum of Art, New York City; the Brooklyn Museum, Brooklyn, New York; the Wadsworth Atheneum, Hartford, Connecticut.

== Life and career ==
Grausman's early work focused on natural forms representing buds and seeds, before exploring the form of the human head. His artistic style is reductivist, emphasizing streamlined contours and reduced detail, using industrial materials such as fiberglass and metals to form the portraits.

Grausman has received numerous awards, including the Rome Prize in Sculpture, a Ford Foundation Purchase Award, and grants from the National Institute of Arts and Letters and The Louis Comfort Tiffany Foundation among others.

In 1959, Grausman studied with Jose de Creeft at the Art Students League in New York City and earned a MFA from the Cranbrook Academy of Art in Michigan. His work is included in the collections of the Metropolitan Museum of Art, New York City; the Brooklyn Museum, Brooklyn, New York; and the Wadsworth Atheneum, Hartford, Connecticut. Grausman has participated in over eighty solo and group exhibitions, at venues which include the National Academy of Design, New York City; Whitney Museum of American Art, New York City; New Arts Gallery, Litchfield, Connecticut; Hollycroft Foundation, The Sculpture Mile, Madison, Connecticut; Pier Walk 2000, Navy Pier, Chicago; DeCordova Museum and Sculpture Park, Lincoln, Massachusetts; Wadsworth Atheneum, Hartford, Connecticut; and the American Academy in Rome, Italy. He has also contributed to the Art in Embassies Program through the U.S. State Department in Washington, D.C. His work is included in various private, museum, and university collections, such as the Baltimore Museum of Art, Maryland; Louis B. Mayer Foundation, Los Angeles; Columbus Museum of Art, Ohio; and the Museum of Contemporary Art, Udine, Italy. Grausman is also known for his studies of birds.

== Exhibitions ==
- 2023 - The Aldrich Contemporary Art Museum, Ridgefield, CT
- 2022 - Washington Art Association, Washington Depot, CT (Solo show)
- 2008 - Katonah Museum of Art, Katonah, New York
- 2006 - Lohin Geduld Gallery, New York
- 2005 - Yellow Bird Gallery, Newburgh, New York
- 2001 - Frederik Meijer Gardens and Sculpture Park, Grand Rapids, Michigan
- 2001 - Aquinas College; Drawing exhibition, Grand Rapids, Michigan
- 1998 - Ice Gallery, New York
- 1997 - Tremaine Gallery, Hotchkiss School, Lakeville, Connecticut
- 1993 - Babcock Galleries, New York
- 1988 - Mattatuck Museum, Waterbury, Connecticut
- 1988 - Wichita Museum of Art, Wichita, Kansas
- 1987 - Robert Schoelkopf Gallery, New York
- 1983 - Robert Schoelkopf Gallery, New York
- 1981 - Washington Art Association, Washington Depot, Connecticut
- 1979 - Borgenicht Gallery, New York
- 1978 - Image Gallery, Stockbridge, Massachusetts
- 1978 - Washington Art Association, Washington Depot, Connecticut
- 1977 - Pennsylvania State University, University Park, Pennsylvania
- 1977 - University of New Hampshire, Durham, New Hampshire
- 1976 - University of Connecticut, Storrs, Connecticut
- 1975 - Alpha Gallery, Boston, Massachusetts
- 1974 - Borgenicht Gallery, New York
- 1972 - Dartmouth College, Hanover, New Hampshire
- 1968 - Alpha Gallery, Boston, Massachusetts
- 1966 - Borgenicht Gallery, New York

== Awards ==
- 2006 - Smithsonian National Portrait Gallery, semifinalist in the Outwin Boochever Portrait Competition
- 2003 - Thomas R. Proctor Prize for Sculpture, National Academy of Design, New York, 178th Annual Exhibition
- 1998 - Alex Ettl Award, National Academy of Design, New York, 173rd Annual Exhibition
- 1995 - Purchase Award, Connecticut Commission on the Arts, Hartford, Connecticut
- 1993 - Certificate of Merit in Sculpture, National Academy of Design, New York, 168th Annual Exhibition
- 1988 - Gold Medal in Sculpture, National Academy of Design, New York, 163rd Annual Exhibition
- 1984 - Albert Jacobson Memorial Award First Prize for Figurative Sculpture, Silvermine Guild, Connecticut, 34th Annual Art of Northeast U.S.A.
- 1981 - The Dessie Greer Prize, National Academy of Design, 156th Annual Exhibition, New York
- 1980 - Elected into the National Academy of Design
- 1980 - The Solon H. Borglum Award for Figurative Sculpture, Silvermine Guild, New Canaan, Connecticut, 30th Annual Art of Northeast U.S.A.
- 1962-65 - Rome Prize Fellowship in Sculpture, American Academy in Rome
- 1962 - Ford Foundation Purchase Award
- 1962 - Alfred G. B. Steel Memorial Prize, Pennsylvania Academy of the Fine Arts: 157th Annual Exhibition
- 1961 - National Institute of Arts & Letters Grant
- 1959 - Louis Comfort Tiffany Foundation Grant
- 1958 - Huntington Hartford Fellowship
- 1958 - Gold Medal of Honor in Sculpture, Audubon Artists, 17th Annual Exhibition
- 1957 - Special Honorable Mention, Avery Award, Architectural League of New York, Ida Abrahms Lewis Award, Rochester Museum of Art, Finger Lakes Exhibition

== Collections (Partial list) ==
Academy Art Museum, Easton, Maryland

Akron Art Museum, Ohio

American Dance Festival, Durham, North Carolina

Art Museum of South Texas, Corpus Christi

Baltimore Museum of Art, Maryland

Brandeis University, Rose Art Museum, Massachusetts

Brooklyn Museum, New York

Columbus Art Museum, Ohio

Connecticut Commission on the Arts, Hartford, Connecticut

Cornell University, Herbert F. Johnson Museum of Art, Ithaca, New York

Dartmouth College, Hanover, New Hampshire

De Cordova Museum and Sculpture Park, Lincoln, Massachusetts

The Fields Sculpture Park, Art Omi International Arts Center, Ghent, New York

Grounds for Sculpture, Hamilton, New Jersey

Hebrew Union College, Cincinnati, Ohio

Hebrew Union College Biblical and Archaeological School, Jerusalem, Israel

Jewish Museum, New York

Frederick Meijer Gardens & Sculpture Park, Grand Rapids, Michigan

Metropolitan Museum of Art, New York

Louis B. Mayer Foundation, Los Angeles, California

Munson Williams Proctor Institute, Utica, New York

Museum of Contemporary Art, Udine, Italy

McNay Art Museum, San Antonio, TX

National Academy of Design, New York

National Portrait Gallery, Washington, D.C.

Neuberger Museum, S.U.N.Y. at Purchase New York

Newark Museum, New Jersey

Pennsylvania State University

Skowhegan School of Painting and Sculpture, Maine

Syracuse University, Syracuse, New York

Union College, Schenectady, New York

University of Connecticut, Storrs

University of Massachusetts, Amherst

University of Michigan, Ann Arbor

University of New Hampshire, Durham

Vassar College, Poughkeepsie, New York

Wadsworth Atheneum, Hartford, Connecticut

Williams College, Williamstown, Massachusetts

Worcester Art Museum, Massachusetts

Yale University Art Gallery, New Haven, Connecticut
