= Emma Sulkowicz =

American artist and activist (born 1992)

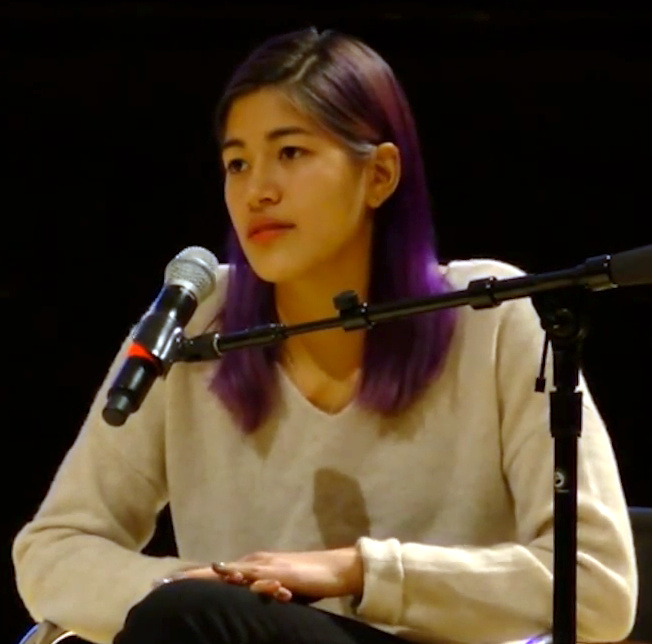
- Sulkowicz in 2014
- Born: October 3, 1992 (age 34); New York City, U.S.
- Occupations: Former performance artist, former anti-rape activist Acupuncturist
- Years active: 2014–2018 (artist and activist); 2026–present (acupuncturist)
- Known for: Mattress Performance (Carry That Weight), Ceci N'est Pas Un Viol
- Father: Kerry Sulkowicz

Emma Sulkowicz (born October 3, 1992) is an American former political activist and former performance artist. While a college student, Sulkowicz developed a national reputation with the performance artwork Mattress Performance (Carry That Weight) (2014–2015). In 2019, she said she had stopped making art and began a master's program in traditional Chinese medicine. As of 2026, Sulkowicz provides acupuncture services in New York City.

== Early life and education ==
Sulkowicz is the child of Sandra Leong and Kerry Sulkowicz, who are both psychiatrists in Manhattan. Sulkowicz is of Chinese, Japanese, and Jewish descent. Sulkowicz attended the Dalton School on the Upper East Side, where she was an A student and competitive fencer. She attended Columbia University, where she fenced sabre for the Columbia University Lions fencing team, and obtained a degree in visual arts in 2015.

== Rape allegation ==
In April 2013, Sulkowicz filed a complaint with Columbia alleging that she had been raped by fellow Columbia student Paul Nungesser on August 27, 2012. A university inquiry found Nungesser "not responsible". In May 2014, Sulkowicz filed a report against him with the New York Police Department (NYPD). After the district attorney's office interviewed Sulkowicz and Nungesser, it found insufficient grounds for reasonable suspicion. Sulkowicz declined to pursue criminal charges further, saying that NYPD officers were dismissive and had mistreated her.

Sulkowicz subsequently focused her senior thesis on a work of performance art entitled Mattress Performance (Carry That Weight). Starting in September 2014, Sulkowicz carried a mattress around campus and to classes. The performance and her allegations received considerable media attention, with Sulkowicz becoming known as "Mattress Girl". Nungesser denied Sulkowicz's allegations of rape, citing as evidence friendly messages from Sulkowicz in the weeks following the alleged attack.

Sulkowicz developed the performance piece after learning that Columbia had found Nungesser not responsible in investigations following sexual assault complaints by two other Columbia undergraduates. A second motivating factor was her belief that Columbia and the NYPD had dismissed the allegations without enough of a serious inquiry. In April 2014, Sulkowicz had filed a Title IX complaint with 23 other students, alleging Columbia has mishandled sexual assault cases. Journalist Vanessa Grigoriadis described this as "the most effective, organized anti-rape movement since the late '70s."

In April 2015, Nungesser filed a Title IX gender discrimination lawsuit against Columbia, its board of trustees, its president Lee Bollinger, and Sulkowicz's supervising art professor Jon Kessler, alleging that they had facilitated gender-based harassment by allowing the art project to proceed. Federal District Court Judge Gregory H. Woods dismissed the lawsuit but allowed Nungesser to refile an amended suit. The refiled complaint was also dismissed. Columbia settled the case under undisclosed terms after the Nungessers attorney began the process of appealing the dismissal.

== Works ==
=== Mattress Performance (Carry That Weight) ===
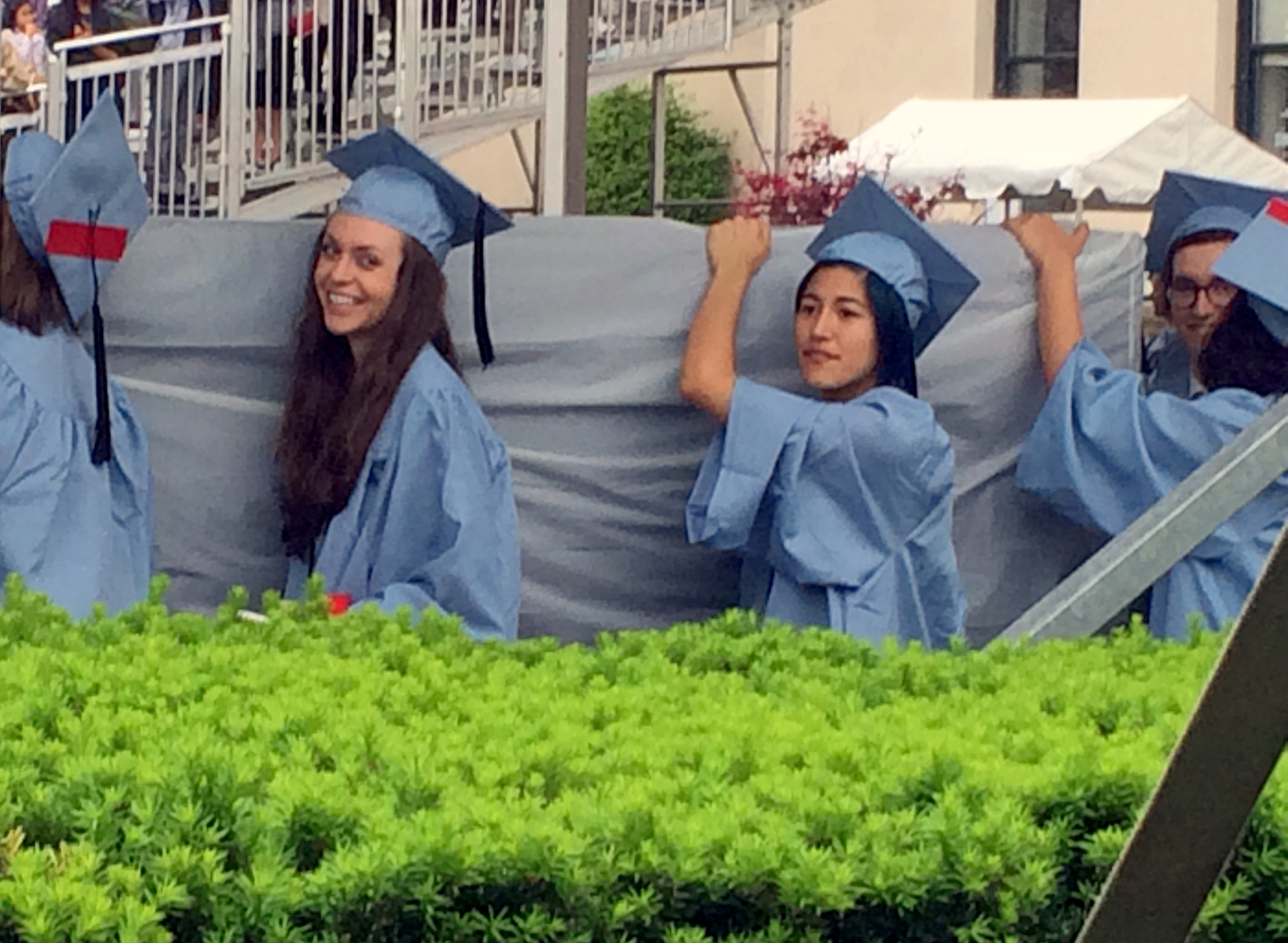
Sulkowicz (center right) carrying the mattress at graduation

The initial endurance performance piece consisted of Sulkowicz carrying a mattress wherever she went on campus during her final year as an undergraduate at Columbia University. The work was a protest against campus sexual assault and the university's handling of the sexual assault case, in which it had cleared the accused of responsibility.

Sulkowicz created Mattress Performance (Carry That Weight) in the summer of 2014 as a senior thesis while at Yale University Summer School of Art and Music. This performance artwork was in protest against campus sexual assault and the university's handling of Sulkowicz's allegation that fellow students at Columbia University, Paul Nungesser anally raped her. The university cleared Nungesser of responsibility, and the district attorney's office declined to pursue criminal charges, citing lack of reasonable suspicion. Sulkowicz's first effort was a video of herself dismantling a bed, accompanied by the audio of her filing the police report, which she had recorded on a cellphone. The mattress later became the sole focus of the piece. Sulkowicz told New York magazine:

I thought about how ... the mattress represents a private place where a lot of your intimate life happens; and how I have brought my life out in front for the public to see; and the act of bringing something private and intimate out into the public mirrors the way my life has been. Also the mattress as a burden, because of what has happened there, that has turned my own relationship with my bed into something fraught.

The 50-pound (23 kg), dark-blue, extra-long twin mattress used in the performance art piece is of the kind Columbia places in its dorms, similar to the one on which she says she was raped. Sulkowicz spent the summer of 2014 creating the rules of engagement: written on the walls of her studio in the university's Watson Hall, these stated that Sulkowicz must carry the mattress whenever she went on university property; that it must remain on campus even when Sulkowicz was not there; and that Sulkowicz was not allowed to ask for help in carrying it, but could accept if help was offered. In September that year, she began carrying it on campus, which she said was a physically painful experience.

During a protest organized by the student group No Red Tape on October 29, 2014, hundreds of Columbia students stacked 28 mattresses on Columbia's president Lee Bollinger's doorstep. The mattresses symbolized the 28 sexual assault complaints in Columbia's Title IX case, reported New York magazine. The Columbia student group Student Worker Solidarity, who booked the space for No Red Tape, would be charged $1500 for the removal of the mattresses on behalf of the university.

Sulkowicz carried the mattress to her graduation ceremony on May 19, 2015. During her walk across the stage to confer her degree, she approached Columbia president Lee Bollinger to shake his hand, as he had been doing for the other graduates. However, he turned away at that time as if to pick something up, and did not end up shaking her hand.

=== Newspaper Bodies (Look, Mom, I'm on the Front Page!) ===
Sulkowicz's final thesis show, the week before graduation in May 2015, included depictions of a naked man with an obscenity and a couple having sex, printed onto a New York Times article about the accused student, Paul Nungesser. Sulkowicz said that the images were cartoons, and asked: "what are the functions of cartoons? Do they depict the people themselves (a feat which, if you've done enough reading on art theory, you will realize is impossible), or do they illustrate the stories that have circulated about a person?" This work was later shown under the title Newspaper Bodies (Look, Mom, I'm on the Front Page!) as part of the group exhibition 7 women 7 sins at Kunstraum LLC in Brooklyn and at the Southampton Arts Center, Southampton, New York.

=== Ceci N'est Pas Un Viol ===
On June 3, 2015, Sulkowicz, working with artist Ted Lawson, released Ceci N'est Pas Un Viol ("This is not a rape"), an eight-minute video of Sulkowicz having sex with an anonymous actor in a Columbia dorm room. The title of the piece is a reference to the caption in René Magritte's 1929 painting The Treachery of Images: "Ceci n'est pas une pipe". Introductory text by Sulkowicz stresses that the sex was consensual throughout, though toward the end it portrays resistance, violence and force. When the video was first posted, each screen displayed the timestamp of August 27, 2012, the night of the alleged assault, but later the date was blurred. Sulkowicz wrote that the work, which examines the nature of sexual consent, was not a reenactment of the alleged rape and later stated that it was a separate piece from Mattress Performance.

Sulkowicz's performance Ceci N’est Pas Un Viol stirred up criticism, raising concerns with how sexual violence was represented in a performance art format. Some reviewers felt that the artwork blurred the lines between real-life and a performance, making viewers uncertain on how to separate the two. Others felt that this piece was a proactive approach addressing rape on a personal level. In the article “Representations of Sexual Violence in Performance”, Jennie Klein argues that while presenting sexual violence in art is necessary for the public to view, that the artist is often exposed to serious harassment and hate after the work is released. Klein also argues that it forces viewers to confront difficult ideas viewing personal trauma. After the release of the performance, Sulkowicz faced many hateful remarks about her appearance; she was ridiculed by standards held by society on how women should look. She also faced problems with the website being disabled by cyberhackers, who continuously attacked the site.

=== Self-Portrait ===
From February to March 2016 at Coagula Curatorial in Los Angeles, Sulkowicz exhibited a piece, Self-Portrait. For the first three weeks of the exhibition, Sulkowicz stood on a pedestal in the gallery, and had one-on-one conversations with visitors who would stand on an identical pedestal in front of her. The exhibition featured a life-sized robotic replica of the artist that was called "Emmatron". Emmatron plays prerecorded answers to several questions Sulkowicz has been repeatedly asked, which she will no longer respond to. A few examples of questions Emmatron had answers to included "Tell me about the night you were assaulted", "Is this art piece a part of Mattress Performance (Carry That Weight)?" and "What do your parents think of all this?" If audience members asked these questions to Sulkowicz during their conversation, the artist would send them to Emmatron for the answers.

=== The Ship Is Sinking ===
In 2017, Sulkowicz performed a bondage performance piece titled The Ship Is Sinking. In the piece, Sulkowicz (in high heels and bikini with the "Whitney" logo, to convey the look of a woman in a beauty pageant) is tied up, berated, and hung from the ceiling on a wooden beam by a man in a suit, "Master Avery", as the figurehead of a ship. Sulkowicz said "white cis men have the privilege of making art that can be divorced from their lives" while "it's a privilege that I don't really have so I'm trying to work in a way that makes the best use of that position as I can." At closing time, the museum turned off its lights, but spectators stayed and used phone flashlights to continue watching until Sulkowicz was finished. Sulkowicz portrayed being able to express the pain she felt and endured, putting herself physically within the artwork.

=== Untitled protest performance ===
On January 30, 2018, Sulkowicz was documented protesting at two New York City museums and a subway station. During the protest, Sulkowicz posed for several photographs in front of Chuck Close paintings at The Museum of Modern Art and The Metropolitan Museum of Art, a Close mosaic in a subway station, and in front of Picasso's 1907 painting Les Demoiselles d'Avignon. Sulkowicz wore black lingerie, with home-made pasties made of tape, and covered her body with drawn-on asterisks. Sulkowicz said that the protest was a response to a New York Times article from January 28, in which members of the art world, responding to allegations of sexual harassment against artist Chuck Close, debated over the future of art created by individuals accused of improper behavior. Among the people quoted in the article was Jock Reynolds, the then-director of the Yale University Art Gallery, who said, "Pablo Picasso was one of the worst offenders of the 20th century in terms of his history with women. Are we going to take his work out of the galleries? At some point you have to ask yourself, is the art going to stand alone as something that needs to be seen?" Sulkowicz was reportedly "appalled" by the comments, asking, "Are you only showing work by Harvey Weinstein?" The protest was described as a "performance" in the media, and as "performative action" by the artist.

=== The Floating World ===
From March 10 to April 22, 2018, The Invisible Dog gallery in Brooklyn, New York, hosted Sulkowicz's first gallery installation as a performance artist, a piece entitled The Floating World. The title The Floating World is a literal translation from the Japanese term Ukiyo, an ironic homophonous Buddhist term for "sorrowful world." The piece consists of a series of glass orbs that symbolize trauma, suspended by ropes, containing floating artifacts of personal significance to Sulkowicz and members of her community. A hybrid style of Shibari, Japanese bondage, and Ukidama, Japanese glass floats tied by fishnets, are used respectively to lift and hold the orbs in the air. The relationship of the ropes and the orbs is the metaphor for the love and support Sulkowicz received from loved ones and the community.
