= Kerry Sulkowicz =

American psychiatrist and psychoanalyst

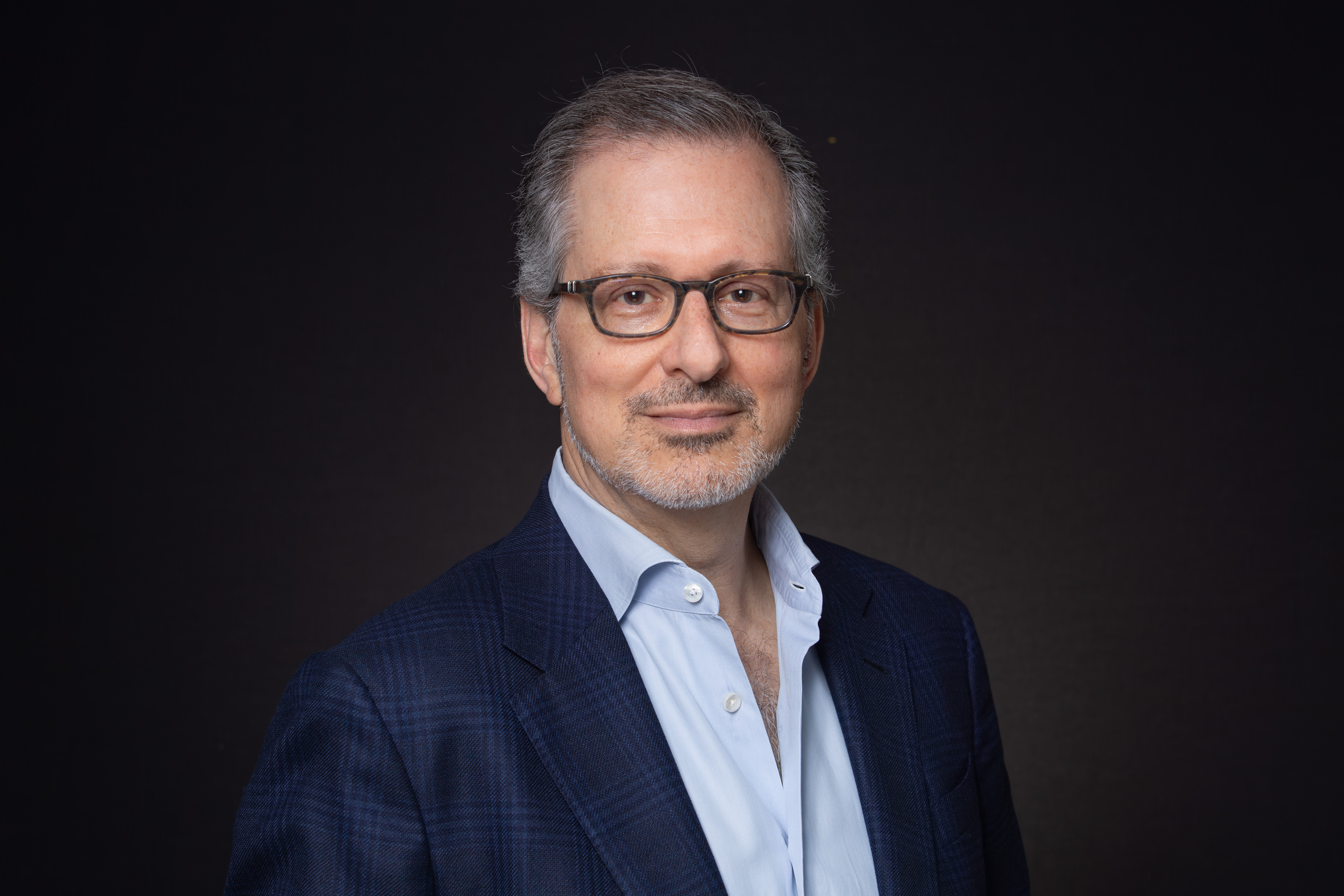
- Born: Kerry Jeff Sulkowicz; 1958 (age 67–68); Dallas, Texas, U.S.
- Occupations: Psychiatrist, business consultant
- Children: 2, including Emma
- Website: boswellgroup.com

Kerry Jeff Sulkowicz (born 1958) is an American psychiatrist, psychoanalyst, and business consultant. He is a clinical professor of psychiatry at the NYU Grossman School of Medicine and the founder of the Boswell Group, a firm that advises CEOs and boards of directors on leadership, management and boardroom dynamics, and organizational culture.

== Education ==
Born in Texas, Sulkowicz graduated from the St. Mark's School of Texas in 1977. He earned an AB from Harvard University and his MD from the University of Texas Medical Branch in 1985. He completed his residency in psychiatry at New York University Medical Center and Bellevue Hospital in 1989 and was certified by the American Board of Psychiatry and Neurology in 1991. He also completed psychoanalytic training at the NYU Psychoanalytic Institute in 1992.

== Career ==
After working in clinical practice, Sulkowicz founded the Boswell Group in New York in 1998, naming the firm after his Jack Russell Terrier, Boswell. The firm provides psychodynamic advising to corporate boards and CEOs, and as of 2026, maintains consultants in New York City, Boston, Philadelphia, San Francisco, Bilbao, and London. His clients have included the board of trustees of Cooper Union. He has contributed commentary on workplace dynamics to publications including The Wall Street Journal, The Washington Post, and The New York Times.

Following the September 11 attacks, Sulkowicz served as a volunteer counselor at a crisis center for Cantor Fitzgerald, a financial services firm that lost over two-thirds of its workforce. He worked with leadership to manage the company's organizational grief and recovery.

In addition to his work with the Boswell Group, Sulkowicz is a clinical professor of psychiatry at the NYU Grossman School of Medicine. In the non-profit sector, he serves as a board member and is a former chair of the board of Physicians for Human Rights, and currently chairs its Advisory Council. He also sits on the advisory council for Acumen.

Sulkowicz was a regular columnist for BusinessWeek until 2006, writing the "Analyze This" column, and has also contributed to Fast Company and the Harvard Business Review.

In 2022, Sulkowicz began a two-year term as president of the American Psychoanalytic Association (APsA), after previously serving as president-elect and as head of its Public Information Committee. At the time of his presidency, his professional focus was advising executives rather than traditional clinical practice. During his tenure, the association's board approved a bylaws amendment to grant full membership rights to psychoanalytic psychotherapists and undertook a broader revision of its governance structure. Sulkowicz resigned from the presidency in the spring of 2023 amidst an internal dispute and public allegations involving antisemitism and racism within the organization.

== Personal life ==
Sulkowicz resides in New York City and London and has two adult daughters. Olivia Sulkowicz is a screenwriter and director. Emma Sulkowicz is an acupuncturist and former performance artist.
