= Jon Kessler =

American artist

- Born: 1957 (age 68–69); Yonkers, NY
- Education: SUNY Purchase
- Occupation: Visual Artist

Jon Kessler (born 1957, Yonkers) is an American artist. He began college at SUNY Purchase from 1974 to 1978 but left after two years to travel in Africa, Europe, and the Middle East. He returned to Purchase in 1978 and graduated in 1980 with honors. Following graduation, Kessler took up a studio in Brooklyn, New York where he continues to work today. He was one of the founders of the Bozart toy company and is currently a professor at Columbia University. He also plays guitar for the X-Patsys, a band he started with artist Robert Longo and actress Barbara Sukowa.

== Work ==
Kessler is best known for his kinetic sculptures that leave the mechanics exposed for the viewer. His work often combines centuries-old analog mechanisms with digital technology to explore the runoff of consumerist, “post-utopian” societies.

Much of Kessler’s work from the 1990s examined the interactions and tensions between Orient and Occident. He often presented Asia as a construct of Western Orientalism, while at the same time portraying the West in a steady state of decline. Kessler blended these visions with equal parts humor and tragedy in pieces such as The Last Birdrunner (1994), a kinetic sculpture based on the science fiction movie Blade Runner. Shown in a solo exhibition at the Luhring Augustine Gallery in New York in 1994, The Last Birdrunner consists of a stuffed bird outfitted in a parachute pack and perched on a ledge that slowly travels up and down while a motor-driven apparatus plays out a haunting dirge on a toy piano. Meanwhile, colored lights flicker in and out of focus against a geodesic dome in the background so that the scene takes on the appearance – though none of the care-free energy – of a Tokyo night club. The Last Birdrunner represents, according to Artforum critic Neville Wakefield, “the nemesis of … utopian dreams in the guise of a lonely cockatoo wearing a life vest.”

With the advent of 9/11, Kessler’s focus shifted to confront themes of surveillance, isolationism, and war mongering in the United States. Kessler’s 2005 exhibition, Palace at 4 A.M., is an “obsessive, aggressive, and handmade” response to the war on terror. Upon entering the installation through the cut-out crotch of a massive-scale porn image, viewers are surrounded by surveillance cameras affixed to mechanisms that reproduce the lock and load click of artillery as they turn. Cheap color televisions stacked into scattered mounds project the live feed from the surveillance cameras, while images of American soldiers entering Saddam Hussein’s palace loom large on the wall. Here Kessler signals the demise of utopia by depicting the world as a “pell-mell kaleidoscopic mishmash… where all hell breaks loose all the time and human life is twisted as readily as metal.”

Kessler’s aesthetic has shifted as well: in contrast with the meditative, self-contained sculptures he made previously, his works in Palace at 4 A.M. are raw, sprawling, duct-taped, and crisscrossed with electrical cables. “You spend all your time polishing metal,” Kessler is quoted as saying of his earlier work. “That refinement is like a trap, and it sends the viewers’ eyes to the wrong place and breaks trust with them, with a sense of authenticity. This … show is about exposing mechanisms – of the sculpture, and of our culture now.” After debuting at MoMA PS1, Palace at 4 A.M. toured Europe, including a 2008 exhibition at the Louisiana Museum of Modern Art in Denmark.

In 2011, Kessler collaborated with artist Mika Rottenberg on SEVEN, a performance and installation created for Performa 11 in New York City, performed at Nicole Klagsbrun Gallery.

Kessler has recently expanded his practice of drawing and is currently working on a project with Dieu Donné, a papermaking studio in Manhattan, New York.

Kessler was the thesis advisor for Emma Sulkowicz's Mattress Performance art project. In April 2015, the student whom Sulkowicz had accused of rape sued Kessler, Columbia University, its trustees, and the university's president for discrimination and harassment, saying that Kessler had “publicly endorsed” Sulkowicz's project. That lawsuit was dismissed by a judge in March 2016.

== Exhibitions ==
Kessler was included in the International Survey of Recent Painting and Sculpture at the Museum of Modern Art in New York in 1983, and took part in the 1985 Whitney Biennial. He has since held one person exhibitions amongst others at Museum of Contemporary Art, Chicago (1986), Contemporary Arts Museum Houston (1987), Carnegie in Pittsburgh (1991), Kestnergesellschaft, Hanover (1994), University of the Arts (Philadelphia) (1997), P.S.1 in New York (2005), Sammlung Falckenberg, Hamburg (2006), Drawing Center, New York (2007), Arndt & Partner, Berlin (2007), Deitch Projects (2004, 2009) and Swiss Institute (2013). In 2019, Kessler will show work in Strange Loops at Artspace, curated by Federico Solmi and Johannes DeYoung.

His work is also in many permanent collections, including those of the MoMA, the Whitney Museum, MOCA, Walker Art Center, and the Israel Museum.

== Awards ==
Kessler received a National Endowment for the Arts Fellowship in 1983 and again in 1985, the St. Gaudens Memorial award in 1995, a Guggenheim Fellowship in 1996, a grant from the Foundation for Contemporary Arts Grants to Artists Award in 2000, a Foundation for the Performing Arts Fellowship in 2001, and a Creative Capital Award in 2015.
