= Gregory H. Woods =

American judge (born 1969)

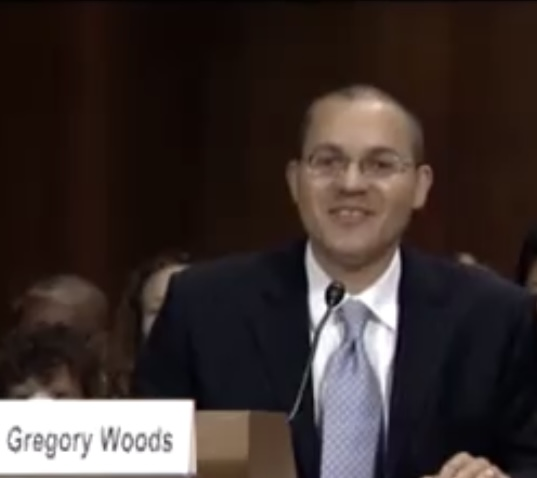

Judge of the United States District Court for the Southern District of New York
- Incumbent
- Assumed office November 18, 2013
- Appointed by: Barack Obama
- Preceded by: Barbara S. Jones

Personal details
- Born: Gregory Howard Woods III; April 1969 (age 56–57) Lewes, Delaware, U.S.
- Education: Williams College (BA); Yale University (JD)

Gregory Howard Woods III (born April 1969) is an American judge and lawyer. In 2013, he became a United States district judge of the United States District Court for the Southern District of New York.

== Early life and education ==
Woods was born in April 1969, in Lewes, Delaware, and grew up in Philadelphia, Pennsylvania. He received a Bachelor of Arts degree, magna cum laude, in 1991, from Williams College, located in Williamstown, Massachusetts. He received his Juris Doctor in 1995 from Yale Law School.

== Career ==
He worked as a trial attorney in the Civil Division of the United States Department of Justice from 1995 to 1998. From 1998 to 2009, he worked at the law firm of Debevoise & Plimpton in New York City, New York, becoming partner in 2004. From 2009 to 2012, he served as Deputy General Counsel at the U.S. Department of Transportation. In 2012, he was confirmed by the U.S. Senate to serve as General Counsel of the U.S. Department of Energy, which he held until his appointment to the bench.

=== Federal judicial service ===
On May 9, 2013, on the recommendation of Senator Chuck Schumer, President Barack Obama nominated Woods to serve as a U.S. district judge of the United States District Court for the Southern District of New York, to the seat vacated by Judge Barbara S. Jones, who took senior status on December 31, 2012. The Senate Judiciary Committee reported his nomination to the full Senate by voice vote on August 1, 2013. On November 4, 2013, the Senate voted to confirm Woods in a voice vote. He received his commission on November 18, 2013.

== See also ==
- List of African-American federal judges
- List of African-American jurists

Legal offices
| Preceded by Barbara S. Jones | Judge of the United States District Court for the Southern District of New York; 2013–present | Incumbent |
