= Sofie Karasek =

Women's rights activist (born 1993)

Sofie Karasek (born June 25, 1993) is an American advocate for women's rights and the fight against sexual assault. In 2013, she helped launch a national movement to hold universities accountable for sweeping sexual harm under the rug under Title IX, and was a key driver behind California's "Yes Means Yes" law. She co-founded the advocacy organization called End Rape on Campus (EROC) in 2013.

== Early life ==
Karasek grew up in Cambridge, Massachusetts and attended Cambridge Rindge and Latin High School. She also lived in Copenhagen, Denmark for several years during her childhood.

== University of California, Berkeley ==
Karasek became a prominent advocate against campus sexual assault while she was a student at UC Berkeley. After she was sexually assaulted in 2012 and her case was mishandled by the university, she connected with Annie Clark and Andrea Pino who were speaking out against similar cover-ups at UNC Chapel Hill. She went on to file federal complaints against Berkeley under Title IX and the Clery Act and was instrumental in creating the 2013-2016 wave of the movement against campus rape. She also organized others to file cases.

In 2015, Karasek was featured in the documentary, The Hunting Ground. She was on stage with Lady Gaga at the 2016 Academy Awards "Till It Happens To You" performance.

== End Rape on Campus ==
Karasek co-founded End Rape on Campus (EROC) in 2013. During her time there, she was a key force in passing laws for survivors' rights across the country, including "Yes Means Yes" in California. She served as the education director of EROC and she left the organization in 2017. She also started the #DearBetsy campaign in January 2017.

== Additional advocacy ==
In February 2018, Karasek argued in the New York Times that America needs institutional responses to sexual harm that prioritize both justice and healing. She's also written for The Guardian and Teen Vogue.
