= Campus Accountability and Safety Act =

The Campus Accountability and Safety Act (CASA) was a bill introduced in the 114th United States Congress with the goal of reducing sexual violence on college and university campuses. First introduced in 2014, a revised bill was introduced in February 2015 by Senator Claire McCaskill of Missouri with nine bi-partisan cosponsors. 43 cosponsors eventually signed on. The bill died in committee at the end of the session without reaching a floor vote in either house.

Supporters of the bill believe that it will help to reform the sexual assault investigation process to protect victims and achieve prosecution of offenders by increasing transparency and cooperation between higher education institutions and local law enforcement. Estimates from the National Sexual Violence Resource Center places the number of men who survive sexual assault in college at about 1 in every 16 students, and for women, every 1 in 5.

== Major provisions ==
=== Clery Act Amendments ===
CASA includes several amendments to the Clery Act, a law requiring colleges and universities to publish statistics relating to crime on their campuses. Under CASA, schools would be required to publish these statistics on their websites. Additional statistics would be required, including data on the verdicts in sexual assault cases, as well as data on dating violence, domestic violence, and stalking. It requires victim advocacy organizations to be included in the development of schools' sexual assault policies. The Department of Education would produce a confidential survey on students' experiences with sexual violence and sexual harassment, which is to be administered at all higher education institutions in the country. An annual report containing the results of the survey would be published on the Department of Education website. Schools that failed to meet the requirements of the Clery Act would be subject to fines of up to $150,000, adjusted for inflation.

=== Confidential advisors ===
CASA would require all schools (colleges and universities) to appoint confidential advisors to assist students claiming to be victims of sexual assault. These advisors would be trained to conduct forensic interviews with students for the purpose of gathering facts on the alleged crimes. They would also advise students on their options for next steps, and serve as liaisons with local law enforcement in cases where a student chooses to report the case to the police. They could arrange accommodations for the students, such as changes to living arrangements or class schedules. Confidential advisors would not be obligated to report to other personnel at the school or to law enforcement.

=== Other provisions ===
CASA would require schools to establish memoranda of understanding with local law enforcement regarding protocols for handling cases of sexual violence. Schools would forward reports of sexual violence to the police only when the alleged victims wished for them to do so. The bill would allow schools to institute systems for anonymous reporting of sexual assault. Schools would be required to publish information on their websites about community resources for assault victims. Students reporting sexual assault would be given amnesty for other misconduct, such as underage drinking, that may become known as a result of the report. Schools would be required to establish uniform disciplinary procedures for sexual violence with no special treatment for particular classes of students, such as athletes or students majoring in particular fields.

Title IX complaints for sexual harassment or assault would be published on the Department of Education website. The Department of Education and the Department of Justice would be given the authority to issue subpoenas for the purpose of enforcing Title IX. Schools found to be in violation of CASA would be subject to fines of up to 1% of their annual operating budgets.

== History ==
The issue of widespread sexual assault at college campuses across the country, and the failure of college administrations to protect victims, as well as to provide accurate data on this issue, has been addressed by the media since the late 20th century. In 2013, Annie E. Clark and Andrea Pino, who had themselves been assault victims at the University of North Carolina, filed a complaint against UNC with the US Department of Education under Title IX provisions. They said that the university's failure to respond adequately to them as alleged victims had violated the law by enabling a hostile academic environment. As the young women worked to conduct research into the issue and support other assault victims, they developed a model for filing Title IX complaints that they shared with student victims at other universities across the country. As of 2015, a total of 169 colleges or universities were under investigation by DOE due to such Title IX claims. These issues were covered in The Hunting Ground (2015), a documentary about sexual assault on college campuses and the treatment of alleged victims. The victims have continued to organize to educate the public and politicians as to the scale of the problems and to seek legislative and other improvements.

The bill was introduced in Congress in February 2015 by Senator Claire McCaskill of Missouri, along with nine bipartisan cosponsors. Hearings were held in July. In January 2016, cosponsor Senator Kirsten Gillibrand of New York said she and McCaskill would work to attach the bill to the reauthorization of the Higher Education Act.

Congress	Short title	Bill number(s)	Date introduced	Sponsor(s)	# of cosponsors	Latest status
113th Congress	Campus Accountability and Safety Act	H.R. 5354	July 31, 2014	Carolyn Maloney (D-NY)	24	Died in committee
113th Congress	Campus Accountability and Safety Act	S. 2692	July 30, 2014	Claire McCaskill (D-MO)	17	Died in committee
114th Congress	Campus Accountability and Safety Act	H.R. 1310	March 4, 2015	Carolyn Maloney (D-NY)	43	Died in committee
114th Congress	Campus Accountability and Safety Act	S. 590	July 29, 2015	Claire McCaskill (D-MO)	37	Died in committee
115th Congress	Campus Accountability and Safety Act	H.R. 1949	April 5, 2017	Carolyn Maloney (D-NY)	31	Died in committee
115th Congress	Campus Accountability and Safety Act	S. 856	April 5, 2017	Claire McCaskill (D-MO)	23	Died in committee
116th Congress	Campus Accountability and Safety Act	S. 976	April 1, 2019	Kirsten Gillibrand (D-NY)	15	Died in committee

== Reception ==
The bill has been supported by a variety of organizations seeking to aid sexual assault victims. The issue at college campuses has been reported by national media since the late 20th century.

Some groups have had mixed reactions to the bill. While praising it for mandating that college administrations involved local police when accusations are made (who would have less reason to suppress reporting and investigation of incidents), the Independent Women's Forum was critical of issues related to weakness in protecting due process for alleged perpetrators.

== Criticism ==
The bill has been criticized by a variety of conservative sources. An editorial in the Las Vegas Review-Journal said that the bill failed to protect the due process rights of accused students and gave schools the incentive to expel accused students, even in cases where there is little or no evidence to substantiate the allegation, in order to avoid the risk of being fined. Hans Bader of the Competitive Enterprise Institute has said that the bill creates a conflict of interest in allowing fines to be levied by the same agency that would receive the money, creating an incentive for that agency, the Department of Education's Office for Civil Rights, to accuse schools of violating CASA in order to profit from the resulting fines.

== See also ==
- The Hunting Ground, 2015 documentary film about sexual assault on campuses and failures of colleges to protect victims
- Campus sexual assault
- Duty to warn
- Post-assault treatment of sexual assault victims
- Sexual Violence and Misconduct Policy Act (British Columbia)
