= Andrea Pino =

Women's rights activist

- Born: Andrea Lynn Pino; 15 February 1992 (age 34); Miami, Florida
- Education: University of North Carolina at Chapel Hill
- Title: Civil rights activist

Andrea Lynn Pino (born February 15, 1992) is an American women's rights and civil rights activist, author, and a public scholar on issues of global gender based violence, media framing of violence, gender and sexuality, and narratives of survivorhood. She is the queer daughter of Cuban refugees and has stated that she is a survivor of sexual assault.

As a student, Pino was one of the primary writers and one of five complainants in the 2013 Title IX and Clery Act complaints against the University of North Carolina at Chapel Hill. Along with Annie E. Clark, Sophie Karasek, Kamilah Willingham, Wagatwe Wanjuki, and Caroline Heldman, she became a national leader in filing this sort of complaint, advising sexual assault victims at universities across the United States. Pino is a primary subject in the 2015 documentary film The Hunting Ground, directed by Kirby Dick and produced by Amy Ziering and is also the author of “We Believe You: Survivors of Campus Sexual Assault Speak Out". Pino has since been dogged by claims from fellow activists in the field and journalists that there is little truth behind the stories she told to gain her national reputation, some going as far as to call it an elaborate “web of lies.”

== Early life ==
Pino was raised in Miami, Florida, United States, in a family of Cuban descent. She attended International Studies Charter High School.

== Education ==
Pino attended the University of North Carolina at Chapel Hill; she was the first in her family to go to college. She has a Bachelor of Arts in Political Science.

She has stated that she was raped twice while in college. The first incident occurred several weeks into her freshman year, when she was in a fraternity member's room and he gave her a drugged drink. According to her, she fell unconscious, and only woke up the next morning, in her own dorm room, with scratches and bruises, with a note attached to her that said "We found you by the road". She did not report the incident.

Her second rape occurred, she says, in March 2012, during her sophomore year, when an unknown male student whom she had just met brought her into a bathroom and forcibly raped her; she emerged, bloodied, and ran back to her room, dripping blood the whole way; she went to sleep, and woke up in a pool of her own blood.

The veracity of Pino's accounts of her rapes has been questioned by journalist Cathy Young, as well as by KC Johnson and Stuart Taylor in their 2017 book The Campus Rape Frenzy. Young also wrote that, after the first time she questioned Pino's story in print, she was contacted by another female anti-rape activist, who did not want to be named, who told Young that she and some other activists were "frustrated" by what she called Pino's "web of lies".

== Activism ==
=== Title IX and sexual assault activism ===
According to Pino, her activism was driven by her experiences with sexual assault and harassment at the University of North Carolina.

After telling administrators that she was raped, Pino claimed that she had been unsupported by the university administration and policies that purported to protect her and other students reporting sexual violence. She alleged that an administrator told her that her problem was that she was "just lazy."

According to Pino, when she began to communicate to the UNC administration her desire to receive support for her assault and for the assaults of students who approached her for help, UNC administration denied that their policies were in non-compliance. In response, Pino approached UNC alumna Annie E. Clark, who also had reported being mistreated. The two began to research Title IX, a federal legislation which grants students the right to an education without sex discrimination, as well as the Clery Act, which grants protections for sexual assault victims on college campuses.

Their research yielded a strategy originally proposed by feminist scholar Catharine MacKinnon in the 1970s. She argued for using the threat of withdrawing federal funding as a means to force universities to effect changes in sexual assault policies.

In January 2013, Pino and Clark, together with several other UNC students and one former administrator, filed a 34-page complaint against the university with the United States Department of Education's OCR. After the women filed the complaint, the OCR and the Clery Compliance Division both launched investigations into how the university was handling sexual assault and crime on campus.

Following the media coverage of the UNC complaint, Pino and Clark connected with sexual assault survivors from institutions across the country and began assisting them in filing Title IX and Clery Act complaints against their institutions. As a result, students have successfully filed complaints against Swarthmore College, Occidental College, the University of California, Berkeley, Dartmouth College, The University of Southern California, and Columbia University, among others.

Clark and Pino's activism are the subject of a 2015 documentary film, The Hunting Ground which featured a song by Lady Gaga titled “Til it Happens to You”. Gaga’s song was nominated for Best Original Song at the 88th Academy Awards and performed it after an introduction by Joe Biden, then Vice President of the United States. During the live performance Pino and 51 other survivors appeared on stage.

Pino’s work has been featured in multiple books and profiled in The New York Times, Vogue, and Cosmopolitan Magazine. She has also appeared on PBS Newshour, RealTime with Bill Maher, AlJazeera, and Melissa Harris-Perry on MSNBC and Pino has spoken for herself in blogs for the Huffington Post. In 2013, she became the first student featured in The Chronicle of Higher Education’s Influence List, was listed on The Huffington Post’s most influential forces in higher education list, and in 2015 Planned Parenthood awarded her their “Care. No Matter What.” Award.

Pino has also helped co-write and introduce the Campus Accountability and Safety Act with Senator Kirsten Gillibrand and advised the White House Task Force To Protect Students from Sexual Assault.

Ultimately in 2018, after a five-year federal investigation into its policies and procedures governing sexual assault and harassment cases and as a result of the work of Pino and others, UNC-Chapel Hill was found in violation Title IX.

In 2020, UNC-Chapel Hill was also found in violation of the Clery Act, which resulted in a $1.5 million fine in a settlement with the U.S. Department of Education after violating federal campus safety law for years. The review, which the university released in November 2019, found that “UNC misrepresented and under-reported campus crime statistics, including sexual assault, failed to properly alert the campus community to serious crimes and did not adequately operate its system of ensuring campus safety.” The results of the review became public weeks after an alarming campus sexual assault survey that revealed nearly half of young women in their fourth year or higher at UNC reported experiencing nonconsensual sexual touching or penetration during college.

=== Queer activism ===
Pino serves on the Board of Directors for Outwords and is currently serving as an Impact Producer for the film, Ahead of the Curve. She recently spoke at Sundance Film Festival on a panel for the film My Name is Pauli Murray and Ahead of the Curve. Pino was awarded the 40 under 40: Queer Women of Washington from The Washington Blade in 2019.

== Career ==
Since 2013, Pino has predominantly worked at non-profits in communications and policy at End Rape on Campus, the National Center for Lesbian Rights, and most recently at the Community Justice Action Fund.

== End Rape on Campus ==
In 2013, Pino and Clark co-founded End Rape on Campus (EROC), an advocacy group for survivors working to end sexual violence on campuses around the country. EROC helps people who have been sexually assaulted with direct resources, with pro bono therapists and attorneys, and it provides assistance with filing complaints. During her tenure at End Rape on Campus, Pino was the Director of Policy and Support as well as co-founder.
