= Willingham =

Willingham may refer to the following places or persons.

== Places in England ==
- Willingham, Cambridgeshire
- Willingham by Stow, Lincolnshire
- Willingham St Mary, Suffolk
- Cherry Willingham, Lincolnshire
- North Willingham, West Lindsey, Lincolnshire
- South Willingham, East Lindsey district of Lincolnshire

== People ==
- Bill Willingham (born 1956), American comic book writer and artist
- Calder Willingham (1922–1995), American writer
- Cameron Todd Willingham (1968–2004), American executed in Texas in 2004
- Chris Willingham (1950–2025), American film and television editor
- Daniel T. Willingham (born 1961), American cognitive psychologist
- Emily Willingham (born 1968), American autism activist and blogger
- Hugh Willingham (1906–1988), American baseball player
- Josh Willingham (born 1979), American baseball player
- Kamilah Willingham, American activist
- Le'coe Willingham (born 1981), American basketball player
- Lynne Willingham, American television editor
- Noble Willingham (1931–2004), American actor
- Shelly Willingham (born 1943), American politician
- Travis Willingham (born 1981), American voice actor
- Tyrone Willingham (born 1953), American college football coach
