= Know Your IX =

American education advocacy group

Know Your IX is an American political advocacy group founded in 2013. It aims to inform students of their right to an education free from gender-based violence under Title IX of the Education Amendments of 1972, which prohibits sex discrimination in institutions receiving federal government funding. The organization also seeks to influence legislation and policy to improve federal enforcement of Title IX and treatment of student victims.

== Founding ==
Know Your IX was co-founded in 2013 by Amherst College student Dana Bolger and Yale Law School student Alexandra Brodsky, both of whom were sexually assaulted on college campuses, as a "survivor-run, student-driven campaign to end campus sexual violence." Goals include clarifying misconceptions regarding Title IX, explaining statutory requirements, and documenting complaint filing protocols. The organization's website explains:

Running on grassroots energy, we educate students across the country about their civil right to education free from sexual violence and harassment while also pushing policy and legislative change on the national level for better federal enforcement of that same right.

In July 2016, Mahroh Jahangiri became Executive Director of Know Your IX. In fall of 2017, Sage Carson assumed leadership of the organization.

== Legal education ==
The Know Your IX website hosts resources including "know your rights" materials on Title IX and the Clery Act. Know Your IX maintains an active social media presence through which it shares its educational resources, The organization also encourages visitors to its website to share educational resources through social media or by printing posters. In October 2013 Amy Poehler's Smart Girls project released an education video promoting the Know Your IX project A number of schools promulgate the information Know Your IX publishes about Title IX, including the Smart Girls video.

== Audience ==
Know Your IX attempts to reach both students who don't know their Title IX rights and existing activists. It aims to be broad based to counter the historical trend that "Feminism and the movement against sexual violence has historically been a very white, upper-middle-class movement", according to Bolger.

== Policy advocacy ==
Know Your IX advocates for state and federal policy and legislative reform. Through its "ED ACT NOW" campaign, the organization first focused on the Department of Education's Office for Civil Rights, from which it demanded increased transparency and Title IX enforcement. Since ED ACT NOW's launch, OCR has released the list of schools under investigation for sexual assault-related violations of Title IX and begun finding schools officially out of compliance with the law. Know Your IX also advocates for legislative change, including authorizing the OCR to fine schools for Title IX violations. In June 2014, Brodsky, Bolger, and former Know Your IX members John Kelly and Laura Dunn participated in federal Senate roundtables regarding changes in Title IX enforcement. Know Your IX has also vocally opposed state laws to require colleges and universities to refer sexual assault reports to law enforcement.

== Journalism guide ==
In fall of 2014, the organization published a guide for journalists writing about gender based campus violence. Reaction was mixed; the California Coalition Against Sexual Assault described it as a "comprehensive guide" for "accuracy and objectivity", whereas in the Washington Examiner, Ashe Schow claimed that Know Your IX "cares less about actual justice and more about automatically believing every accuser and labeling the accused as rapists".
