= Til It Happens to You =

2015 single by Lady Gaga

Single by Lady Gaga
- Released: September 18, 2015
- Recorded: 2015
- Genre: Pop
- Length: 4:18
- Label: Interscope
- Songwriters: Diane Warren; Lady Gaga
- Producer: Lady Gaga

Lady Gaga singles chronology
"I Can't Give You Anything but Love" (2014)	"Til It Happens to You" (2015)	"Perfect Illusion" (2016)

Music video
- "Til It Happens to You" on YouTube

"Til It Happens to You" is a song produced and performed by American singer Lady Gaga. She co-wrote the song with Diane Warren for the 2015 documentary film The Hunting Ground, which deals with campus rape in the United States. The song had leaked onto the Internet through an unofficial recording made at the film's premiere at the 2015 Sundance Film Festival. It was later released by Interscope Records to digital retailers on September 18, 2015. The director and producer of the film had looked for someone influential to write a song for it, and music supervisor Bonnie Greenberg contacted Warren, who was interested. She wrote the song with Gaga and producer Nile Rodgers accompanied them during the recording, providing his suggestions.

A universal song about any kind of loss in life, "Til It Happens to You" was placed during two sequences in the film, highlighting the pain of sexual assault. The song consists of an orchestral production with strings and an emotional vocal delivery from Gaga. Lyrically, it asks listeners to stand in a victim's position and try to understand the turmoil they go through. "Til It Happens to You" was later included as part of a public service announcement video directed by Catherine Hardwicke. The video depicts various instances of violence against women and sexual assaults. It ends with a cautionary note about the effects of such distress, and individuals finding solace with their close friends and relatives.

A portion of the proceeds from retail sales was donated to organizations supporting victims of sexual assault. Commercially, the song reached the top thirty in Finland, Greece, and Spain, and it peaked at number 95 on the Billboard Hot 100 in the United States in March 2016. "Til It Happens to You" won an award at the 68th Primetime Emmy Awards for Outstanding Original Music and Lyrics and it was nominated for Best Song Written for Visual Media at the 58th Annual Grammy Awards and for Best Original Song at the 88th Academy Awards, along with numerous other awards. Such aforementioned nods make "Til It Happens to You" the first song in history to be nominated for a Grammy Award, Academy Award and an Emmy Award in the same year.

== Background and release ==
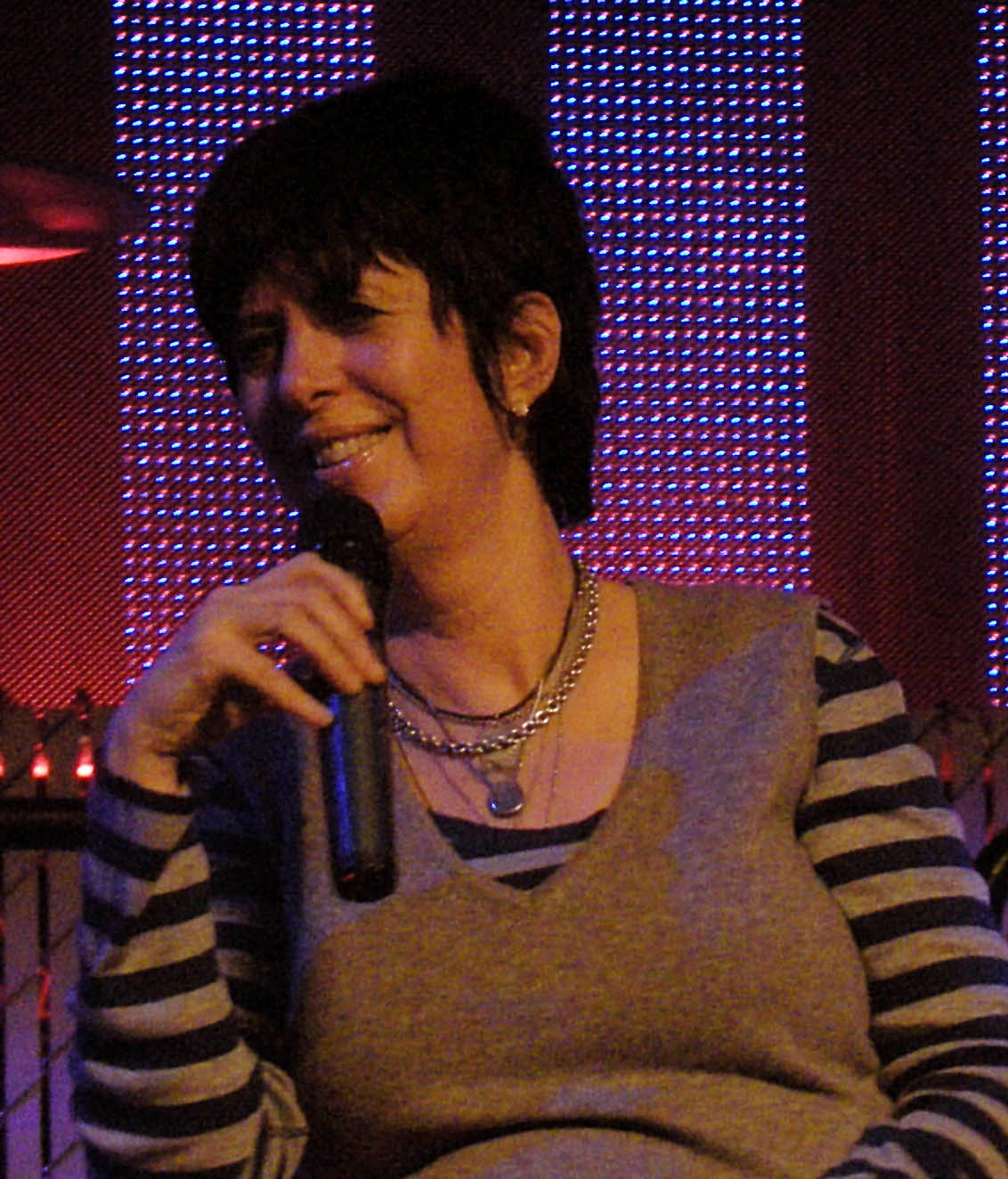
Diane Warren co-wrote "Til It Happens to You" with Lady Gaga.

"Til It Happens to You" was written by Diane Warren and Lady Gaga, and recorded by the latter for The Hunting Ground (2015), a documentary film about campus rape in the United States. Director Kirby Dick and producer Amy Ziering wanted someone with "major" influence to record a song for the film, believing it would generate publicity and promote the subject. They contacted executive producer Paul Blavin, explaining their idea and added that they did not have the resources to find someone. Blavin started searching and met with music supervisor Bonnie Greenberg, who introduced him to Warren. Warren was moved by the idea saying: "I cannot not write a song for you. And not only can I not not write a song for this movie, I'm going to gift it to you." She wrote the song after viewing scenes from the film almost a year before the track's release. Warren then called Gaga and played her a rough demo, but was unsure about her involvement. So she decided to fly to New York and try to work with Gaga; the latter accepted the song and decided to record it. Warren said of the song and Gaga's contributions:

"I heard about [the film] and it just really touched me, and she had stuff in her life that she could relate to. Gaga is one of the most talented artists I have worked with in my life and I'm excited about doing more with her... There are a lot of levels to the song. There's something very vulnerable about it and something very defiant about it, especially the way [Gaga] sings it. The first verse is vulnerable—'You tell me it's going to get better?'—and the second verse comes in and it builds. 'Really? It gets better? No. You don't know until it happens to you...'"

Warren also added that the song's message was universal in nature and relatable to any loss faced in life. Gaga, who herself is a victim of rape, revealed during the Producers Guild of America Awards 2015, that the song's theme was important to her family as well. Her father's sister Joanne had been sexually assaulted while attending college, and the subsequent torment worsened her prevailing lupus, resulting in her death and profoundly affecting Gaga's family. The singer became involved with New York state Governor Andrew Cuomo's push for new legislation to help eradicate "rape culture" in American universities, signing a letter supporting it. Titled "Enough Is Enough", the legislation went into effect in July 2015.

A controversy over the song’s writing arose in January 2016 when songwriter/producer Linda Perry claimed on Twitter that Diane Warren wrote the track alone and only gave Lady Gaga a co-writing credit for promotional reasons. Warren quickly defended Lady Gaga, confirming it was a genuine collaboration that shaped the final vocals and arrangement, though often vocals and arranging are distinct from the songwriting process.

On Twitter, Perry wrote, “I have Diane’s original demo with her singing. The only line that has been changed ‘Till you’re at the end, the end of your rope. Originally was ’TIL YOU GOT A HOLE RIPPED IN YOUR SOUL.’ So I guess technically one line was changed so sure Gaga possibly ‘rewrote’ a line but chances are Diane still took part in rewriting that line which means Gaga contributed a few words. Is that writing? Not in my book.”

The documentary features two versions of the song, one during the body of the film and the second at its closing, and highlights the sequences of the pain of sexual assault. While the song played, the lead subject, an assault survivor, reminisced about the impact of rape while walking around a college campus. Ziering concluded that having Gaga sing the track fulfilled their need for publicity since she "[brought] a whole other demographic. Anyone who has that kind of platform to reach all sorts of people that maybe would not necessarily be inclined to be interested in your issue... it's incredible." "Til It Happens to You" leaked onto the Internet before it was officially released, through an unofficial recording made at the film's premiere at the 2015 Sundance Film Festival. In April 2015, Warren confirmed that the song would have an official release and was waiting for a final audio mixing by Gaga. It was later released as a digital download single on September 18, 2015.

== Recording and composition ==
"Til It Happens to You" (2015)
A 24-second sample of the song, where Gaga sings the first chorus, backed by the classical production. The sample also illustrates the emphasis on Gaga's vocals and the key change from E_{3} to D_{5}.

In an interview for a Billboard podcast, Nile Rodgers spoke about the song's recording sessions and working with Gaga and Warren. He had met Gaga at a party and she invited him to join them in the studio. During recording, Gaga was singing in a D note, over the F note of the music that was being played. Rodgers suggested to Warren that since the D vocals made the song sound like a country track, they could instead inverse the chords into thirteenth (an octave plus a sixth), thus serving a dominant function. Warren accepted the suggestion and the song was re-recorded. Gaga reportedly struggled while recording the song, since it caused her to recall her own trauma. Warren explained that it was "very emotional for her. She couldn't even talk through it at times." Gaga told an interviewer with Variety that Warren had helped her feel comfortable about the song and its subject matter, allowing her to transcend the singing and put the correct emotional depth in her performance.

"When Diane first played me what she had begun with the song, I needed no convincing about the record... it was about sharing that part of myself with the world... We talked a lot about what I felt the song needed in order to reach as many young people as possible. I felt that it needed to not stay in a purely emotional state, but that it was going to somehow grow throughout the performance and the song and by the end, kind of be full of rage. I feel like what this song accomplishes is women—or men—rising to say, 'You think you can hurt me? You don't know about power. Because after what you did to me, you don't even know how much stronger I am.'"

"Til It Happens to You" is a somber tune featuring orchestral production and soaring strings. The pop ballad delivers an empowering message: "Hold your head up and be strong / When you fall you gotta get up", and has been described as "stirring and emotional". Featuring a classical production, the song emphasizes Gaga's vocals, keeping focus on the lyrics, which clarifies that one cannot understand the feelings of a victim unless they have been in similar situation. The first verse is sung by Gaga in a vulnerable voice, which gradually changes into an aggressive tone, and finally a joyous one during the final lyrics. According to the sheet music published at Musicnotes.com, "Til It Happens to You" is set in the time signature common for a slow tempo of 59 beats per minute. It is composed in the key of A minor with Gaga's vocals spanning from E_{3} to D_{5}. The song follows a basic sequence of Am–C–F_{maj7}–C–G/B as its chord progression.

== Critical reception ==
Jeff Benjamin from Fuse noted that the song contains a "powerful message" while the composition was evocative of her "biting" ballads like "Dope". Brennan Carly from Spin said the song "highlights [Gaga]'s evocative voice" and is similar in tone to "Speechless" and "Gypsy". While reviewing the documentary, Leslie Felperin of The Hollywood Reporter said that the song provided "an extra jolt of poignancy" in the film. Lauren Valenti from Marie Claire described the track as "robust and orchestral", adding that the lyrics "command attention". She complimented the decision to have Gaga sing the track, given her connection to sexual abuse. Bradley Stern from MuuMuse also compared it to "Dope" and "Speechless", while comparing the string arrangement to the music of Lana Del Rey. Stern described it as a "massive production" complimenting the lyrics by being straightforward. For Manohla Dargis of The New York Times, Dick was able to successfully change the sombre mood of the documentary with the inclusion of the song. Spencer Kornhaber from The Atlantic praised the song and Gaga's vocals, saying that: "Even with such somber subject matter, [the singer's] booming delivery and dramatic phrasing will probably remind people of the time when [Gaga's 2009 single] 'Bad Romance' ruled the radio."

Declaring the song Gaga's "most stirring" release, Michelle Geslani from Consequence of Sound called the track: "a sweeping and intensely powerful number — it's not just any ordinary pop song". Christopher Tapley from Variety praised both Gaga and Warren's songwriting, describing it as: "something of an anthem for the cause... It is one of the strongest contenders in this year's race for best original song [in the Academy Awards]. But far more than that, it is a rally cry for a movement." Lisa Wright wrote in NME that the song is: "a somber piano ballad befitting of the topic with lyrics that depict the frustration of being told to pick yourself up and carry on by people who couldn't possibly understand your situation." Idolator's Robbie Daw claimed that the "powerful, unsettling" visuals were complemented by a "strong vocal performance" from Gaga. Brittany Spanos from Rolling Stone called it an "evocative track", which highlighted Gaga's vocals and believed it to be "a perfect follow-up to [Gaga's Cheek to Cheek album] with Tony Bennett". Spanos added that "[an Academy Award win would be a triumph] following [Gaga's] critical and commercial miss with most recent album Artpop and help break Warren's losing streak at the show."

== Chart performance ==
"Til It Happens to You" charted on the Ultratip charts of Belgium (Flanders and Wallonia) while in Finland it debuted and peaked at number 21 on the Finnish Download Chart. Across Europe it peaked at number 46 in France, number 29 in Spain, and also reached number 5 on the Greece Digital Songs chart published by Billboard. In the United Kingdom, the song entered the UK Download Chart at number 67, while on the official UK Singles Chart it reached a peak of number 171. The song also reached a peak of number 52 in Scotland. On the Belgian Ultratip charts, "Til It Happens to You" reached number 45 in Flanders region and number 42 in Wallonia.

In the United States, the song initially failed to chart on the Billboard Hot 100, but later entered at number 95 in March 2016, following Gaga's performance of the song at the 88th Academy Awards. According to Billboard, the song had sold less than 2,000 downloads during the week before the Academy Awards sales period. Following the performance, the song sold nearly 28,000 downloads (2,120% sales increase), becoming its best digital sales week, and debuted at number 27 on the Hot Digital Songs chart. It also garnered one million streams (up by 546%) for the tracking week, contributing its debut on the Hot 100. Billboard reported that the song sold more than "Writing's on the Wall" by Sam Smith, the latter having won the Academy Award for Best Original Song. According to Nielsen SoundScan, "Til It Happens to You" has sold a total of 71,000 downloads in the country as of March 2016.

On the Dance Club Songs, the song became Gaga's 14th entry to reach the top of the chart on the issue dated January 23, 2016, landing her in 10th place in the ranking of artists with the most number-ones on the dance chart. It was her first song to reach the top of the chart since "Applause" (2013). The rise to the top of the dance chart was aided by 30 remixed versions of the track, including those from Dave Audé, Tracy Young and Dirty Pop. On the Billboard issue dated February 20, 2016, the song debuted at number 24 on the Adult Contemporary chart; it has reached a peak of number 19. According to radio program directors, the song received positive response from their listeners prompting airplay.

== Accolades ==
"Til It Happens to You" won the award for Best Song in a Documentary, at the 2015 Hollywood Music in Media Awards, which took place on November 11, 2015, for Best Original Song at the 20th Satellite Awards, and for Best Song from a Movie at the 3rd iHeartRadio Music Awards. Other nominations for the song came from 21st Critics' Choice Awards and the St. Louis Film Critics Association (StLFCA), where it was listed for Best Song category, from Georgia Film Critics Association and Denver Film Critics Society in the category for Best Original Song, and from the 58th Annual Grammy Awards for Best Song Written for Visual Media. "Til It Happens to You" also received a nomination for an Academy Award in the category of Best Original Song for the 2016 ceremony. It is the fifth song from a documentary to be listed for an award in that category. Gaga dedicated the nomination to survivors of sexual assault, through a message on her Twitter account. In February 2016, Gaga and Warren were honored at the 11th Annual Los Angeles Italia Film, Fashion and Art Fest, with the festival's Song of the Year Award. The song also won an award at the 68th Primetime Emmy Awards for Outstanding Original Music and Lyrics, however, just Warren was credited because of their cue sheet accreditation requirement. With its nomination, "Til It Happens to You" became the first, and to date, only, song ever nominated for a Grammy Award, Academy Award and an Emmy Award in the same year.

== Music video ==
=== Development and synopsis ===
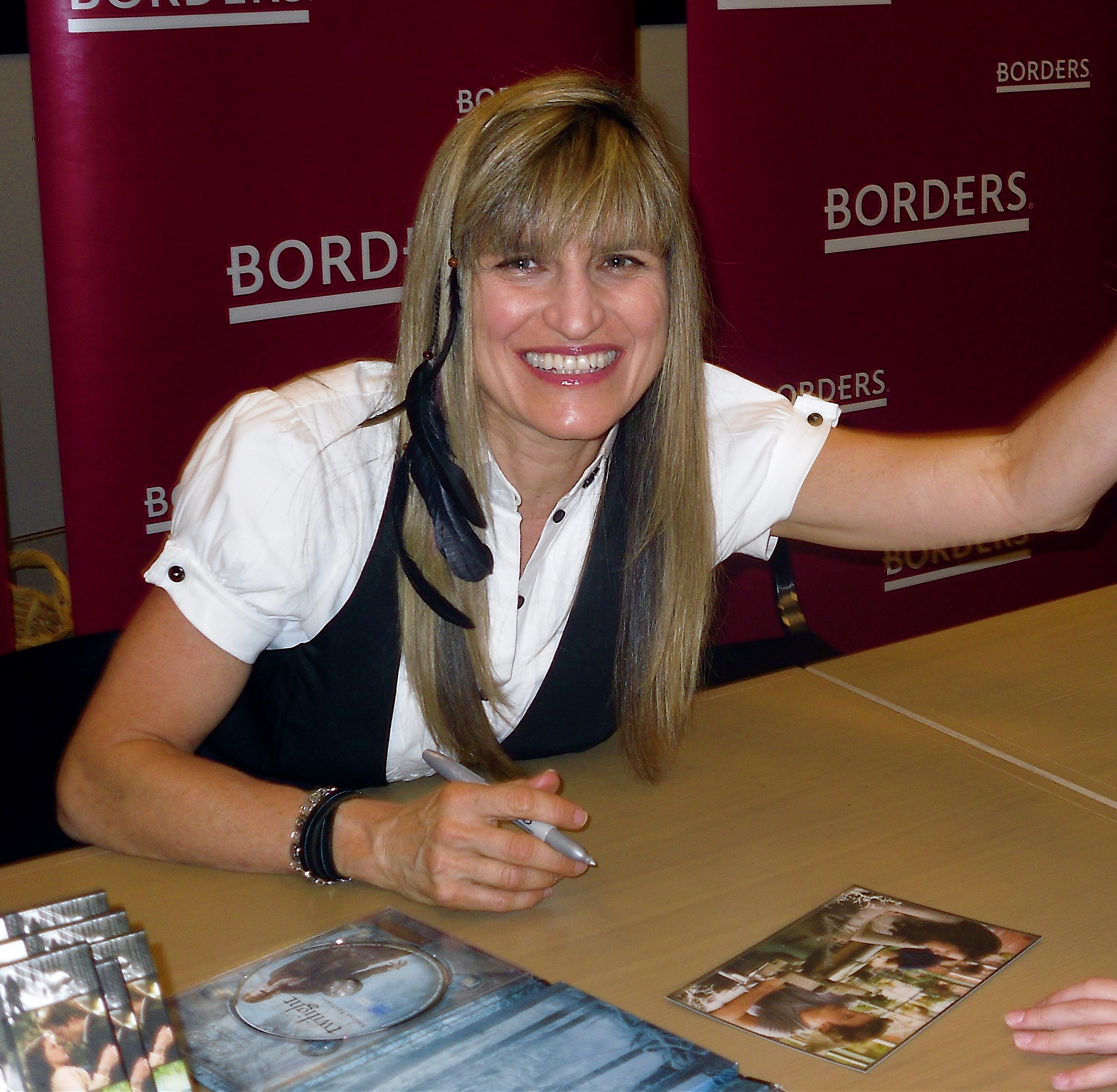
Director Catherine Hardwicke tried to portray sexual assaults realistically in the video.

In August 2015, it was announced that the song would be released as part of a public service announcement (PSA) video, directed by Catherine Hardwicke, to raise awareness about sexual assaults in college campuses. The Hollywood Reporter described it as casting "an emotional spotlight on young women in vulnerable situations that college students will readily recognize". Hardwicke said of the PSA's important message: "You can't watch the documentary without screaming at the screen. We tried to capture those stories in a very visceral way and add another voice to this powerful call to action." Production costs were underwritten by the film's executive producers, Paul Blavin and Regina K. Scully. The video was released the same day as the digital release, with Gaga tweeting out a link to it and adding: "We hope u feel our love & solidarity through the song & perhaps find some peace in knowing u r not alone through this film". Warren believed that the PSA video highlighted her observations about victims coming forward to speak about the assault on them:

"It seems like it's all coming out of this dark closet it was in... It was secretive. It wasn't what you talked about. But now, people are saying, 'We're not going to be victims anymore, we're going to call you on it, whether it's on a campus or anywhere'. I want [people] to know they're not alone and they're not victims, but they're survivors."

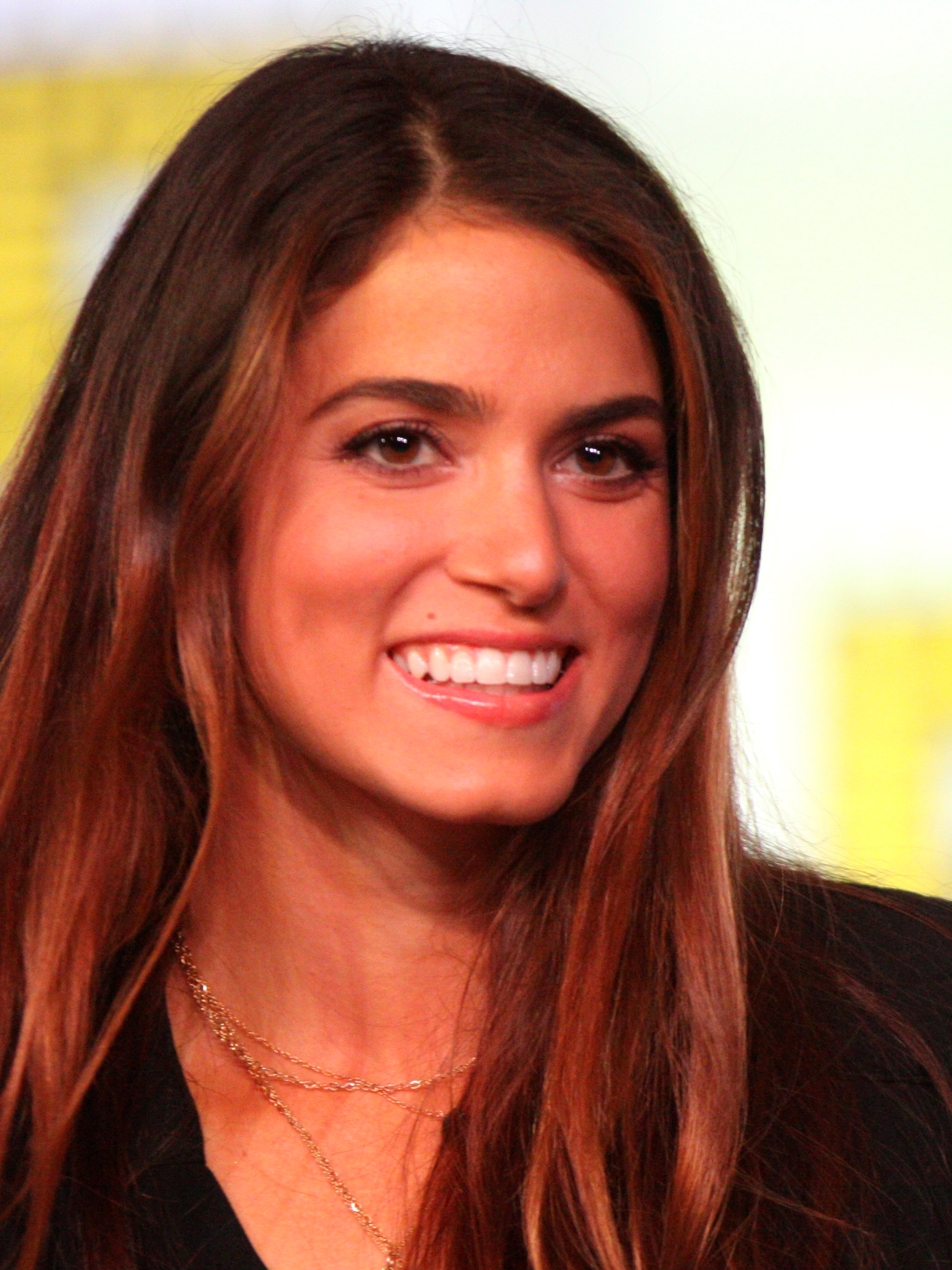
Actress Nikki Reed portrayed one of the rape victims in the music video.

The clip portrays sexual assaults mostly against women, and how they cope after the incident. The black-and-white video opens with a warning message: "The following contains graphic content that may be emotionally unsettling but reflects the reality of what is happening daily on college campuses." It then shows a girl walking through an empty corridor, followed by young people in various activities in a college campus: reading (portrayed by actress Nikki Reed), a trans man adjusting his chest binder in the bathroom, attending a party (one of the partygoers being portrayed by actress Kiersey Clemons). However they are all sexually assaulted, with one of the scenes showing a couple of young girls being drugged and raped at the party. The heartbroken girls and the trans man cry, while alternate images show them expressing their emotions by inscribing words on themselves. Ultimately they find solace and hope in friendship, and leave the college with their friends, as the words inscribed on their bodies change to positive messages. Near its ending, the music video displays the message: "One in five college women will be sexually assaulted this year unless something changes", following which the message points the audience to the Facebook page for The Hunting Ground and Itsonus.org, the White House support website for people who have endured a sexual crime. A portion of the earnings from the song's digital sales will be donated to organizations supporting victims of sexual assault.

=== Reception and analysis ===
Kornhaber described the video as a "sombre, socially conscious curveball" but wondered why Gaga released the PSA-like video, adding that she has: "always been good at surprises, and unfortunately, no time is better than any other when it comes to discussing the issues she's singing about". Christopher Rosen from Entertainment Weekly described the clip as "powerful, disturbing and emotional". Writing for The Daily Telegraph, Radhika Sanghani declared that each scenario in the video appeared realistic and wrote: "by making sure the attacks differ in location, scenario and the appearances of both rapist and victim, Gaga is breaking the myth of there being a 'typical rape'". Corinne Heller from E! believed that the "graphic, emotional and hard to watch" video was able to deliver a "powerful message", one that was close to Gaga due to her real-life rape experience. Wright described the video for NME as a "brutal, monochrome rendering" of the subject matter, with "harrowing" depictions of the rapes. She added that the rape statistics at the end of the video were "horrifying" but complimented Gaga for using her popularity to promote awareness of the subject. Loretta Donelan from Bustle believed that Gaga's previous music videos had political aspects but were open to interpretations. But with the music video of "Til It Happens to You", she showed maturity by featuring "chilling scenes of staged sexual assaults".

Alex Rees from Cosmopolitan felt that the video contained "uncomfortable footage", but added that the "emotionally unsettling" images were able to reflect on the actual reality of what happens on college campuses. Claire Hodgson from the same publication described the clip as a "beautifully shot, brilliantly acted short film", which "really does not hold back when it comes to portraying the real horror of sexual assault in the most graphic way possible". Emily Shire from The Daily Beast was positive about the clip, calling it: "both chilling and beautiful. The overall effect is as much, if not more, a credit to acclaimed director Catherine Hardwicke. The brutality of these snapshot scenes are remarkably moving in the scariest and most sickening way possible". However, Shire was disappointed with one aspect of the PSA – that the victims are supported by their friends and close-ones and that was enough to cope through the trauma. Instead Shire wanted to see the legal ramifications of such traumatic incidents, with the victims going to the police. Shire concluded the review saying: "Gaga and Hardwicke deserve props for creating such a powerful, visceral, and aesthetically striking PSA. They've brought a tremendous amount of attention to rape and sexual assault. Yet, attention alone is inadequate balm for the victims of rape." Conversely, Dan Solomon of Fast Company believed the video to be an "important statement" from Gaga and believed that it would direct further attention to The Hunting Ground.

== Live performances ==
Gaga performed "Til It Happens to You" live for the first time on October 29, 2015 at the annual amfAR gala, along with cover versions of "Call Me Irresponsible", "Bang Bang (My Baby Shot Me Down)" and "La Vie en rose". She also performed the song at the Billboard Women in Music event on December 11, 2015, where she was presented with the award for Woman of the Year. The song was also performed at an intimate gathering at the Peninsula Hotel in Beverly Hills. The audience consisted of the filmmakers and the rape survivors featured in the documentary. Gaga reportedly became emotional while performing the song, and thanked the filmmakers for including the song in the film. She also performed the song at the 2015 Producers Guild of America Awards, where The Hunting Ground was awarded a special recognition trophy. Actress America Ferrera introduced Gaga but she did not appear on stage for sometime leading to a few moments of "nervous laughter from the audience" as Ferrera tried to joke about the situation, until the singer finally arrived in front of her piano on stage.

Gaga performed the song at the 88th Academy Awards after an introduction by Joe Biden, then Vice President of the United States. She sang it while sitting in front of a white piano, and near its conclusion, over 50 survivors of sexual assaults joined her onstage, with words like "survivor" and "not your fault" written on their bodies. Mike Ayers from The Wall Street Journal called it a "poignant performance" of the night. Katie Atkinson from Billboard listed the performance as one of the best moments of the awards show, saying that Gaga "made a huge impact on the Oscars stage. Her performance alone would have been powerful enough, but when the curtains opened behind her to reveal a sea of sexual assault survivors standing in solidarity, the emotional bar was raised to the next level." Kesha performed a cover of the song, accompanied with Warren on piano, at the Humane Society Gala in Los Angeles on May 7, 2016.

== Credits and personnel ==
Credits adapted from Soundtrack.Net.

=== Management ===
- Stefani Germanotta P/K/A Lady Gaga (BMI) Sony ATV Songs LLC / House of Gaga Publishing, LLC/ GloJoe Music Inc. (BMI)

=== Personnel ===
- Lady Gaga – songwriter, vocals, producer, piano
- Diane Warren – songwriter
- Stephen Oremus – string arranger, music director, conductor
- Ryan Shore – leader
- Alyssa Park (concertmaster), Natalie Leggett, Yelena Yegoryan, Jessica Guideri – violin 1
- Darius Campo (principal), Sarah Thornblade, Christine Wu – violin 2
- Shawn Mann (principal), Alma Fernandez – viola
- Tim Loo (principal), Trevor Handy – cello
- Mike Valerio – bass
- Tim Stewart – guitar
- George "Spanky" McCurdy – drums
- Ricky Tillo – guitar
- Andrew Robertson – recording, mixing engineer
- Ivy Skoff – union coordinator
- Lisa Einhorn-Gilder – production coordinator for recording

== Charts ==
=== Weekly charts ===
Weekly chart performance for "Til It Happens to You"
Chart (2015–2016)	Peak position
Belgium (Ultratip Bubbling Under Flanders)	45
Belgium (Ultratip Bubbling Under Wallonia)	42
Canada Hot 100 (Billboard)	46
Finland Download (Latauslista)	21
France (SNEP)	46
Greece Digital Songs (Billboard)	5
Italy (Musica e Dischi)	31
Scottish Singles Sales (Official Charts)	52
Spain (Promusicae)	29
UK Singles (Official Charts)	171
UK Singles Downloads (Official Charts)	67
US Billboard Hot 100	95
US Adult Contemporary (Billboard)	19
US Dance Club Songs (Billboard)	1

=== Year-end charts ===
2016 year-end chart performance for "Til It Happens to You"
Chart (2016)	Position
US Dance Club Songs (Billboard)	8

== Release history ==
Release dates and formats for "Til It Happens to You"
Region	Date	Format(s)	Label(s)	Ref.
Australia	September 18, 2015	Digital download	Interscope; Universal	
Austria	September 18, 2015	Digital download	Interscope; Universal	
Belgium	September 18, 2015	Digital download	Interscope; Universal	
Canada	September 18, 2015	Digital download	Interscope; Universal	
France	September 18, 2015	Digital download	Interscope; Universal	
Germany	September 18, 2015	Digital download	Interscope; Universal	
Italy	September 18, 2015	Digital download	Interscope; Universal	
New Zealand	September 18, 2015	Digital download	Interscope; Universal	
Sweden	September 18, 2015	Digital download	Interscope; Universal	
Switzerland	September 18, 2015	Digital download	Interscope; Universal	
United States	September 18, 2015	Digital download	Interscope; Universal	
Japan	September 19, 2015	Digital download	Interscope; Universal	
United Kingdom	September 19, 2015	Digital download	Interscope; Universal	
United States	March 7, 2016	Adult contemporary radio; hot adult contemporary radio; modern adult contemporary radio	Interscope	
United States	March 8, 2016	Contemporary hit radio	Interscope	

== See also ==
- Artists with the most number-ones on the U.S. Dance Club Songs chart
- List of number-one dance singles of 2016 (U.S.)
