= Sexual Violence and Misconduct Policy Act (British Columbia) =

Provincial law in British Columbia, Canada

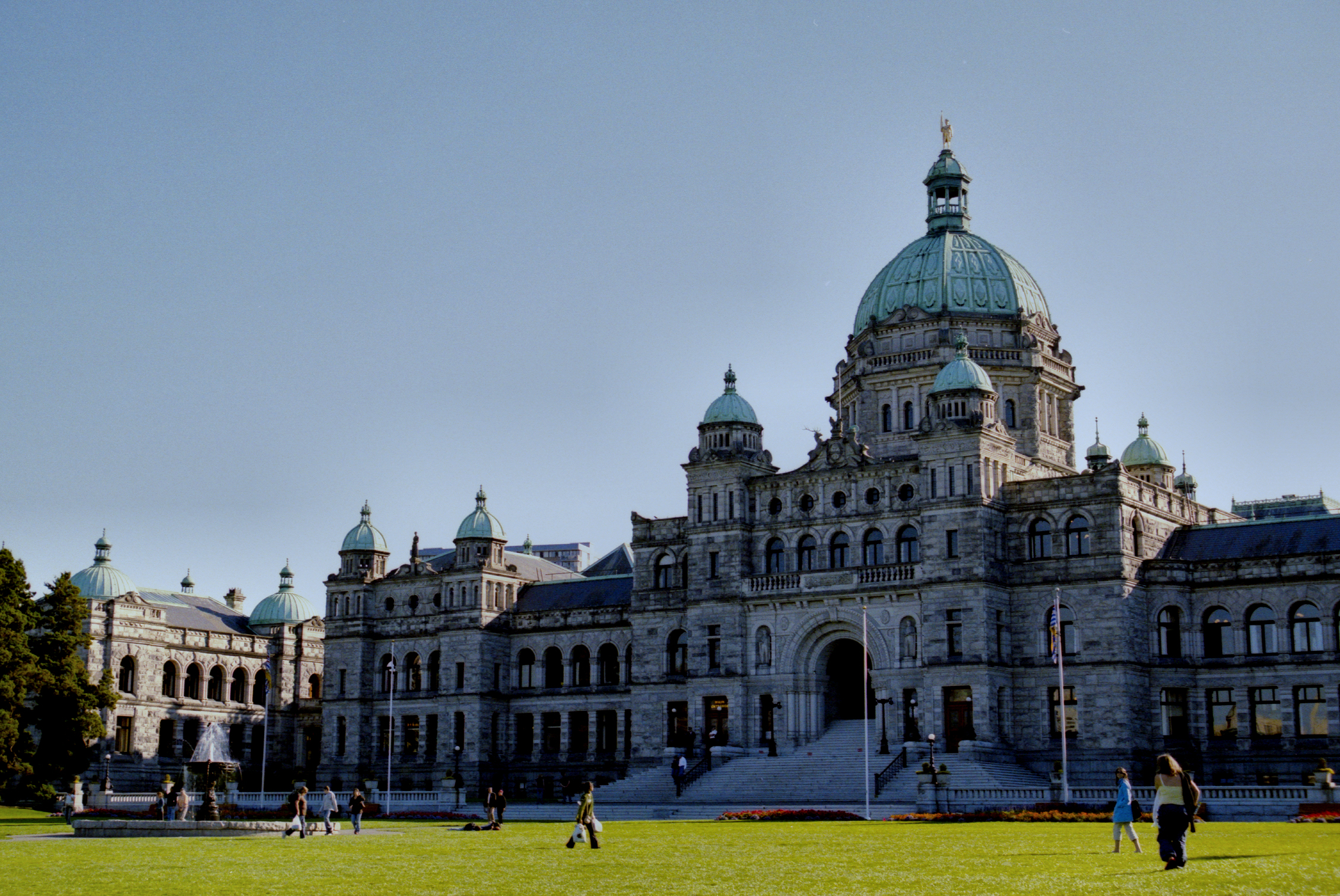

Legislative Assembly of British Columbia
- Citation: S.B.C. 2016, c. 23
- Assented to: May 19, 2016

Legislative history
- Bill citation: Bill 23
- Introduced by: Andrew Wilkinson MLA
- First reading: April 26, 2021
- Second reading: May 10, 2016
- Third reading: May 17, 2016
- Status: Current legislation

The Sexual Violence and Misconduct Policy Act (SBC 2016, c. 23) is a provincial law in British Columbia, Canada, requiring publicly funded post-secondary institutions in the province to implement a policy addressing campus sexual violence and sexual misconduct. Post-secondary institutions subject to Act 23 must develop a policy that covers several specific types of sexual misconduct involving a student, sexual misconduct prevention, and institutional responses to sexual misconduct. Post-secondary institutions must make their policies publicly available on their website. The legislation was passed in 2016 and came into force in 2017, by which time all post-secondary institutions subject to the Act were required to have developed a policy.

== Sexualized violence among Canadian post-secondary students ==
In 2019, 71% of Canadian post-secondary students reported that they witnessed or experienced unwanted sexual behavior. According to Statistics Canada, these behaviors included inappropriate jokes or comments, sexually explicit materials, physical contact, and pressure for sexual relations. Additionally, in 2019, one in ten women indicated that they had been victims of sexual assault in either on-campus or off-campus settings. The perpetrators of these sexual behaviors have mostly been identified as fellow students. Sexual assault in Canadian universities is likely under-reported, with less than one in ten women have reported incidents to their school. Statistics Canada highlights that survivors and witnesses indicated the incidents were either insufficiently serious or they did not understand or trust their school's reporting process.

== Background ==
The Act is based on a 2015 private member's bill sponsored by former Leader of the BC Green Party, MLA Andrew Weaver. Weaver's bill was based on the Sexual Violence and Harassment Action Plan Act in Ontario. The private member's bill was not initially passed, because the BC Liberal government at the time argued that sufficient mechanisms already existed for post-secondary institutions to properly address campus sexual violence in BC. The government changed its position after student activists and organizations were mobilized around numerous high-profile sexual assault cases primarily involving students at the University of British Columbia. Survivors alleged that UBC had responded to the cases inappropriately and had not done enough to address the allegations of sexualized violence. Student organizations including the Alliance of BC Students and BC Federation of Students advocated for the government to adopt legislation requiring post-secondary institutions to have a stand-alone policy clearly outlining the process for students to report sexualized violence and how cases of sexualized violence were to be handled. Weaver's private members' bill was taken up as a government bill on May 19, 2016, as a result of student advocacy, which the Minister of Advanced Education, Andrew Wilkinson, cited as part of the government's motivation to pass the legislation. The Act came into force exactly one year after it was passed, by which time post-secondary institutions subject to the Act were expected to be in compliance with it.

While the majority of the original private member's bill was kept the same, several key amendments were made when it was adopted by the government. Firstly, it was amended to include two additional items under its definition of sexual misconduct: the threat of sexual misconduct and the distribution of sexually explicit photos or other media of a person without their consent. The government also decided to remove two accountability mechanisms included in the original private member's bill: the requirement to collect and make publicly available data on sexualized violence by each institution, and to no longer empower the cabinet to impose fines upon institutions for lack of compliance.

== Accountability mechanisms ==
There are a number of accountability mechanisms included in Act relating to the development and implementation of sexual violence and misconduct policies. Firstly, institutions are required to develop their policies in consultation with students and any other required classes of persons, as identified by the Minister. Each institution must report on its progress in implementing its policy to its governing body annually and must conduct a review process to make any necessary amendments every three years. The reviewing processes must also include consultations with students and prescribed classes of persons. An institution may also be required to conduct a review of its policy at any point if directed by the Minister of Advanced Education and Skills Training.

The Minister may direct a survey to be conducted by the institution and may specify who must be included in the survey, specific questions to be included in the survey, the date by which the survey must be conducted, and how the survey is to be conducted. Each post-secondary institution is required to make its sexual violence and misconduct policy publicly available on its website. Additionally, the Ministry of Advanced Education and Skills Training maintains a comprehensive list of policies established under the Act.

== Criticisms ==
=== Limited Oversight ===
Student advocacy organizations, including the Alliance of BC Students and Students for Consent Culture Canada, have highlighted that the Act lacks an independent oversight body to hold institutions accountable. These critics have suggested that the Act should be amended to require all institutions to collect and publicly release more detailed reports on the implementation of sexual violence and misconduct policies. According to these critics, mandated detailed reports would provide for more focused and effective policy. Additionally, mandates would hold institutions more publicly accountable. Critics have also called for the collection and publication of utilization data on campus sexualized violence policies.

=== Limited Scope and Requirements ===
The Act has also been criticized for having a limited scope of concern and minimal requirements for post-secondary institutions in terms of the content of their respective policies. Organizations such as Students for Consent Culture and Alliance of BC Students have put forth eleven minimum standards to guide the development of effective and survivor-centric policies. These standards are:

- The creation of a well defined, stand-alone policy
- Right to both institutional and external legal processes
- Mandatory sexual violence sensitivity training for decision-makers
- Assurance that the complainant will not be questioned at any point about their sexual history
- Protections from face-to-face encounters with respondents
- Clear timelines for both initial responses and investigation processes
- Protections from gag-orders
- Broader scope of policy application
- Informing complainants of sanctions
- Minimum 30% student representation on committees
- Review period of two years.

Advocates argue that these minimum standards should be amended into the existing legislation, in order to address the issue of institutional betrayal.
