= The Hunting Ground =

- Theatrical release poster
- Directed by: Kirby Dick
- Written by: Kirby Dick
- Produced by: Amy Ziering
- Cinematography: Aaron Kopp; Thaddeus Wadleigh
- Edited by: Douglas Blush; Derek Boonstra; Kim Roberts
- Music by: Miriam Cutler
- Distributed by: RADiUS-TWC
- Release dates: January 23, 2015 (Sundance Film Festival); February 27, 2015 (United States)
- Running time: 103 minutes
- Country: United States
- Language: English
- Box office: $405,917

The Hunting Ground is a 2015 American documentary film about the incidence of sexual assault on college campuses in the United States and the reported failure of college administrations to deal with it adequately. Written and directed by Kirby Dick and produced by Amy Ziering, it premiered at the 2015 Sundance Film Festival. The film was released on February 27, 2015, an edited version aired on CNN on November 22, 2015, and was released on DVD the week of December 1, 2015. It was released on Netflix in March 2016. Lady Gaga recorded an original song, "Til It Happens to You," for the film, which was nominated for the Academy Award for Best Original Song.

The documentary focuses on Annie E. Clark and Andrea Pino, two former University of North Carolina at Chapel Hill students who filed a Title IX complaint against UNC in response to their rapes while enrolled. The use of Title IX in campus sexual assault cases became a model for universities across the country.

Critics of the film, including writer Emily Yoffe and several Harvard Law School professors, have questioned The Hunting Ground's accuracy and objectivity (Harvard was one of the institutions criticized for minimizing the issue of sexual assault and protecting an alleged perpetrator). Among the issues raised by critics are the film's portrayal of one man as a rapist, while not disclosing that the university and its police had found him not responsible for the alleged sexual assault and for the use of controversial statistics. The filmmakers have defended the film.

== Background ==
According to Ziering, reactions from women on college campuses to Dick and Ziering's 2012 documentary The Invisible War, which focuses on the issue of sexual assault in the US military, inspired them to make a film about the subject of sexual assault at American colleges.

== Content ==
The Hunting Ground presents multiple students who were sexually assaulted at their college campuses, and say that college administrators either ignored them or required that they navigate a complex academic bureaucracy to have their claims addressed. The film shows that many college officials were more concerned by minimizing rape statistics for their universities than by the welfare of the students and contains interviews with college administrators who state that they were pressured into suppressing rape cases. The film chiefly criticized actions (or lack thereof) by university administrations, including Harvard, the University of North Carolina at Chapel Hill, Amherst College and Notre Dame but it also examines fraternities such as Sigma Alpha Epsilon, colloquially referred by some as “Sexual Assault Expected”.

The narrative features Andrea Pino and Annie Clark, students at the University of North Carolina, who became campus anti-rape activists after being assaulted. In response to what they saw as an inadequate response from the university, they filed a Title IX complaint against The University of North Carolina on January 16, 2013 (along with three other students), and co-founded the group End Rape on Campus.

As well as talking to women who share how they were victims of both rapists and unsympathetic university officials, the filmmakers interviewed students, parents and administrators. The Hunting Ground also includes a conversation with a former Notre Dame police officer who criticized how rape cases were handled at that institution. The officer spoke of a case where he was not allowed to question a student accused of rape, a Notre Dame football player, at any time that student was on athletic department property. The Hunting Ground also includes testimony from male victims of sexual assault. Producer Amy Ziering stated the filmmakers, "felt it was important to show men and women. For men it's often harder to speak up because there is a social stigma associated with rape. Many male victims were feeling ashamed."

A section of the film is focused on Jameis Winston, the former star quarterback for the Florida State Seminoles football team and newly drafted quarterback of the Tampa Bay Buccaneers and the accusation of sexual assault against him while at Florida State. His accuser, Erica Kinsman, publicly discusses the incident for the first time after Jameis Winston refused to speak about the incident.

The filmmakers feature experts who say that most rapes are committed by a small number of repeat offenders. Director Kirby Dick stated that less than eight percent of the population is responsible for more than 90 percent of all sexual assaults. Producer Amy Ziering said that "our failure as a society to apprehend perpetrators leaves criminals at large who are savvy and experienced and able to continue to commit these crimes with impunity."

Senator Kirsten Gillibrand (D-NY) makes a brief appearance in the film.

== Soundtrack ==
The film features two tracks by Lady Gaga: "Swine" and an original song written by Diane Warren and Gaga titled "Til It Happens to You". The song won the award for Best Song in a Documentary at the 2015 Hollywood Music in Media Awards and was nominated for a 2016 Grammy Award in the Best Song Written for Visual Media category. "Til It Happens to You" was subsequently nominated for the 2016 Academy Award for Best Original Song, losing to the song "Writing's on the Wall" from the film Spectre. Another song played in the documentary is "Stay Gold" by First Aid Kit.

== Reception ==
=== Critical ===
The Hunting Ground has received acclaim from film critics. Rotten Tomatoes indicated that 93% of critics gave the film positive reviews based on 73 reviews, with an average score of 7.8/10. Its consensus reads: "The Hunting Ground isn't director Kirby Dick's strongest work as a filmmaker, but the movie's powerful message more than trumps any technical weaknesses." At Metacritic, which assigns a weighted average rating out of 100 to reviews from mainstream critics, the film has received an average score of 77, considered to be "generally favorable," based on 29 reviews. It would was billed by the Sundance Film Festival as a "piercing, monumental exposé of rape culture on campuses". The film received a standing ovation at its premiere.

Eric Kohn, on Indiewire, gave the film a B+ grade, describing it as a "stirring call to action". Entertainment Weekly praised the film for its strong emotional impact. David Edelstein, writing for New York, advised parents to watch it before sending their children to college.

A columnist for the Philanthropy Journal predicted that, more than any other Sundance film in 2015, the film had the potential to affect activism and social policy. While most reviews were positive, Variety film critic, Ella Taylor accused The Hunting Ground of "shoddy journalism" and called it a "loaded piece of agitprop that plays fast and loose with statistics and our sympathy with victims of campus sexual assault".

=== Accolades ===
The Hunting Ground was nominated for the "Outstanding Producer of Documentary Theatrical Motion Picture" award by the Producers Guild of America, but lost to Amy. On December 1, 2015, the Academy of Motion Picture Arts and Sciences announced that The Hunting Ground was one of the fifteen documentary films shortlisted for an Oscar nomination in the Best Documentary Feature category, but it failed to make the final list of five nominees announced on January 14, 2016.

In December 2015, the film won the 2016 Stanley Kramer Award given to "a production, producer or other individual whose achievement or contribution illuminates and raises public awareness of important social issues." The Hunting Ground was also one of the five movies nominated in the Documentary category of 2016 MTV Movie Awards.

=== Political ===
On February 26, 2015, one day before the theatrical release of the film, a bipartisan group of twelve U.S. Senators, accompanied by the film's lead subjects, Annie Clark and Andrea Pino, reintroduced the Campus Accountability and Safety Act. The act, originally introduced in July 2014, would require universities to adopt standard practices for weighing sexual assault charges, and to survey students on the prevalence of assault. New York governor Andrew Cuomo presented the film at the Lincoln Center for the Performing Arts on June 2, 2015, to promote, and help pass, new legislation to address sexual assault at New York institutions of higher learning. At the screening, Cuomo called the movie "an extraordinary documentary that really publicized this issue…and show how institutions were slow to respond." California Senator Barbara Boxer responded to the film by saying "The power on that status quo side, you're going to see it in response to this film. Believe me, there will be fallout."

Emily Yoffe of Slate challenged the accuracy of the documentary, based upon her evaluation of the testimony against Brandon Winston by witness Kamilah Willingham, who said that Winston had sexually assaulted a classmate. The Harvard Crimson criticized the film for misrepresenting sexual assault statistics and other details. The Crimson article also charged that the film's creators had included excerpts of a fake video—created as a prank for the student comedy group On Harvard Time—showing a female Harvard applicant vomiting upon learning she had been accepted to the university. Writing for New York Magazine, Jesse Singal criticized the film's use of statistics from a controversial research paper by Dr. David Lisak, stating that the paper's claims were inaccurate and had little support from other academics. However, the same statistic was used in the Harvard Law Review article Uncomfortable Conversations: Confronting the Reality of Target Rape on Campus by Diane L. Rosenfeld, the Founding Director of the Gender Violence Program and a Lecturer on Law at Harvard Law School (128 Harv. L. Rev. F. 359).

An additional controversy surrounded emails sent by producer Amy Herdy trying to solicit interviews for the film, in which Herdy stated that The Hunting Ground was "very much in the corner of advocacy for victims, so there would be no insensitive questions or the need to get the perpetrator's side." Herdy's email said that the filmmakers wanted the alleged perpetrator to "get complacent because then we will ambush him." In response, the filmmakers stated that the singling out of those emails was a diversionary tactic to take attention away from the failings of college administrators and discredit the filmmakers.

=== Responses by film subjects ===
==== Harvard Law School ====
In an open letter released in November 2015, nineteen Harvard Law School professors (Elizabeth Bartholet, Scott Brewer, Charles Donahue Jr., Nancy Gertner, Janet Halley, Bruce L. Hay, Philip B. Heymann, David W. Kennedy, Duncan M. Kennedy, Randall L. Kennedy, Charles J. Ogletree Jr., Richard D. Parker, J. Mark Ramseyer, David Rosenberg, Lewis D. Sargentich, David L. Shapiro, Henry J. Steiner, Jeannie C. Suk, Laurence H. Tribe) criticized The Hunting Ground. They wrote, "This purported documentary provides a seriously false picture both of the general sexual assault phenomenon at universities and of our student Brandon Winston," citing, among other sources, Emily Yoffe's article in Slate. The producers posted an online response to this criticism.

In a statement emailed to The Harvard Crimson, the film's director and producer, Kirby Dick and Amy Ziering, criticized the law professors' letter, saying it was "irresponsible and raises an important question about whether the very public bias these professors have shown in favor of an assailant contributes to a hostile climate at Harvard Law".

Jeannie Suk, one of nineteen Harvard Law professors to sign the letter, told the Foundation for Individual Rights in Education that the filmmakers' comment "exemplifies the reckless way some people use the concept of a hostile environment these days", and later tweeted "if actually accused of violating Title IX because of our criticism of @thehuntinground we will not be allowed to speak about that". Suk later wrote that there have been several inquiries about filing a Title IX complaint and likened the misuse of Title IX to Laura Kipnis' experience. Another of the professors, Janet E. Halley, stated "What [the filmmaker's statement] really means is that they don't want the debate".

In a January 5, 2016 op-ed piece in the Huffington Post, filmmakers Dick and Zeiring reiterated their charges against the nineteen Harvard Law professors signing the letter, stating those professors had "launched a public campaign to discredit an assault survivor" and that their "aggressive actions send a very chilling message to all current and future students at Harvard and Harvard Law: if you report a sexual assault, your professors may come after you publicly". Professor Janet E. Halley, a signatory to the original letter, disputed Dick and Zeiring's statement, saying "The Hunting Ground has profoundly misled the public about the ensuing processes which came out decisively against those claims".

==== Florida State University ====
Florida State University (FSU) President John Thrasher said that The Hunting Ground "contains major distortions and glaring omissions to support its simplistic narrative that colleges and universities are to blame for our national sexual assault crisis." The filmmakers contended in response that Thrasher "just didn't want the film to be seen because it criticizes FSU for their handling of a sexual assault case." Additionally, in a November 21, 2015 open letter to Thrasher (published in the Huffington Post), The Hunting Ground director Kirby Dick and producer Amy Ziering stated that "the film is completely accurate in its depiction of Ms. Kinsman's account, and its depiction of how her case was handled by Florida State University".

On November 20, 2015, lawyers for Jameis Winston sent a letter to CNN president Jeff Zucker threatening legal action against the network, should it air the film. Despite warnings from Winston's attorneys, CNN ran the documentary on November 22, along with a follow-up program, hosted by Alisyn Camerota, discussing the film and the issues it raised. CNN's airing of The Hunting Ground was a moderate ratings success, with 457,000 estimated viewers. CNN ranked first among cable news networks during The Hunting Ground's time slot in the 25–54 demographic, and placed second for total viewers.

== Awards and nominations ==
Year	Award	Organization	Category	Result
2015	Best Documentary	Stockholm Film Festival	Best Documentary	Nominated
2015	Grand Jury Award	Sheffield International Documentary Festival	Best Documentary	Nominated
2015	SLFCA Award	St. Louis Film Critics Association	Best Documentary Film	Nominated
2015	SLFCA Award	St. Louis Film Critics Association	Best Song (for "Til It Happens to You")	Nominated
2015	Audience Award	Traverse City Film Festival	Best Documentary Film	Runner-up
2015	Check Points	Bergen International Film Festival	Human Rights Award	Won
2015	WIN Award	Women's Image Network Awards	Outstanding Documentary Film	Won
2015	UFCA Award	Utah Film Critics Association Awards	Best Documentary Feature Film	Won
2015	CFCA Award	Chicago Film Critics Association Awards	Best Documentary	Nominated
2015	DFWFCA Award	Dallas-Fort Worth Film Critics Association Awards	Best Documentary	5th Place
2015	HMMA Award	Hollywood Music In Media Awards (HMMA)	Best Original Score - Documentary	Won
2016	Oscar	Academy Awards	Best Original Song (for "Til It Happens to You")	Nominated
2016	Grammy	Grammy Awards	Best Song Written for Visual Media (for "Til It Happens to You")	Nominated
2016	Emmy Award	National Academy of Television Arts and Sciences	Exceptional Merit in Documentary Filmmaking	Nominated
2016	Emmy Award	National Academy of Television Arts and Sciences	Outstanding Original Music and Lyrics (for "Til It Happens to You")	Won
2016	Critics Choice Award	Broadcast Film Critics Association Awards	Best Song (for "Til It Happens to You")	Nominated
2016	MTV Movie Award	MTV Movie and TV Awards	Documentary Film	Nominated
2016	Seattle Film Critics Award	Seattle Film Critics Award	Best Music, Original Song (for "Til It Happens to You")	Nominated
2016	DFCS Award	Denver Film Critics Society	Best Original Song (for "Til It Happens to You")	Nominated
2016	GAFCA Award	Georgia Film Critics Association (GAFCA)	Best Original Song (for "Til It Happens to You")	Nominated
2016	Gold Derby Awards	Gold Derby Awards	Best Original Song (for "Til It Happens to You")	Nominated
2016	GMS Award	Guild of Music Supervisors Awards	Best Music Supervision for a Documentary	Nominated
2016	Cinema Eye Audience Choice Prize	Cinema Eye Honors Awards	Audience Choice Prize	Nominated
2016	Stanley Kramar Award	PGA Awards	PGA Award	Won
2016	PGA Award	PGA Awards	Outstanding Producer of Documentary Theatrical Motion Pictures	Nominated
2016	EDA Award	Alliance of Women Film Journalists	Best Documentary Feature Film	Nominated
2016	OFTA Award	Online Film & Television Association	Best Music, Original Song (for "Til It Happens to You")	Nominated
2016	Artisan Award	Santa Barbara International Film Festival	Best Original Song (for "Til It Happens to You")	Won

== See also ==
- "A Rape on Campus"
- Post-assault treatment of sexual assault victims
- 2024 Cornell University rape allegations
