= Annie E. Clark =

American women's rights and civil rights activist

- Born: Annie Elizabeth Clark; July 15, 1989 (age 37); Raleigh, North Carolina
- Education: B.A., University of North Carolina at Chapel Hill

Annie Elizabeth Clark (born July 15, 1989) is a women's rights and civil rights activist in the United States. She was one of the lead complainants of the 2013 Title IX and Clery Act charges lodged against the University of North Carolina at Chapel Hill, claiming that the institution violated the law by the way they handled sexual assault complaints. Clark and Andrea Pino, then a fellow UNC student and also a victim of sexual assault, launched a nationwide campaign to use Title IX complaints to force U.S. universities to address sexual assault and related problems more aggressively. Clark is co-founder with Pino of End Rape on Campus, an advocacy group for victims of campus sexual assault.

== Background ==
Clark was born in Raleigh, North Carolina. She is the granddaughter of former congressman, Charles Orville Whitley, and attended Jesse O. Sanderson High School. She attended the University of North Carolina at Chapel Hill (UNC), completing a Bachelor of Arts Degree in Political Science. During college at UNC-Chapel Hill, Clark was inducted into Pi Sigma Alpha, the Order of the Golden Fleece Honorary Society, and the Order of the Grail-Valkyries for her service and student leadership. She was also inducted into Phi Beta Kappa for her academic work. In 2011, she presented her paper, "Interpersonal Violence Policy and Prevention in US Higher Education," at the United Nations Commission on the Status of Women.

== Activism ==
Clark's activism stems in part from a personal experience during her freshman year at UNC. According to Clark, when she sought support for the incident, a UNC school staff member "advised her that rape was like a football game, and that the next day was like being a Monday-morning quarterback where you look back and think, What would I have done differently?" as if the student were at fault. In response to the lack of support, and related to learning of other students who had suffered sexual assault, Clark began research into abuse at other campuses. She eventually explored filing a challenge to the university under Title IX, a 1972 Civil Rights Act amendment that grants certain rights of opportunity to those pursuing higher education.

Together with Andrea Pino, a fellow student at UNC who said she had also suffered assault, Clark began work on an OCR complaint under Title IX against UNC's administration. In January 2013, after interviewing "hundreds of victims," Clark and Pino, in conjunction with other UNC students and alumni and one former administrator, filed a 34-page complaint against the university with the US Department of Education’s Office of Civil Rights. By March 2013, DOEd accepted the complaint and launched an investigation into how the university handled sexual assault cases.

After the UNC case made national headlines, Clark voiced hope that the complaints filed would help bring "other stories of assault and cover-up into the light," so that change could occur nationwide. Clark and Pino were sought out by survivors from across the country and gave them emotional support; in addition, they aided them in filing similar Title IX complaints at their own schools. The two women helped form a network of students and staff at higher education institutions across the country who united around this issue. At a May 2013 press conference announcing filings by students at Occidental College, Dartmouth College, Swarthmore College, the University of California, Berkeley, and the University of Southern California, Clark issued a statement that victims of sexual violence had "reached a critical mass where we can no longer be ignored." By 2015, some 169 colleges/universities were under investigation by DOEd under Title IX and related to their treatment of sexual assault cases.

== Representation in other media ==
- Clark and Pino's activism are the subject of documentary film The Hunting Ground (2015), directed by Kirby Dick. (He is known for a documentary on sexual assaults in the US military.) In a kind of public shaming, the film "mentions dozens of schools by name and focuses on six." The film was aired on CNN, shown at the Sundance Film Festival, and was released in national distribution in theaters. It has generated considerable controversy. Sexual assault victim advocacy groups note that the issue has been of longstanding on college campuses.
- In spring 2016, Clark and Pino published We Believe You: Survivors of Campus Sexual Assault Speak Out with Henry Holt and Co. The book was named a top ten book on the Amelia Bloomer List in 2017.

== End Rape on Campus ==
In 2013, Clark and Pino co-founded 'End Rape on Campus' (EROC), a group working to end sexual violence on campuses around the country. EROC helps people who have been sexually assaulted with direct resources, pro bono therapists and attorneys, and it provides assistance with filing complaints.

== See also ==
- Rape culture
- Victim advocacy
- Post-assault treatment of sexual assault victims
