= Ziering =

Ziering is a surname. Notable people with the surname include:

- Amy Ziering (born 1962), film producer and director
- Bob Ziering (born 1932), American illustrator
- Ian Ziering (born 1964), American actor
- Marilyn Ziering, American business executive and philanthropist
- Nikki Ziering (born 1971), American model and actress
- Sigi Ziering (1928–2000), German-born American business executive, playwright and philanthropist
