= Stanley Black (businessman) =

American real estate investor and philanthropist

- Born: 1932 (age 93–94)
- Occupations: Real estate investor, philanthropist
- Known for: Co-founder of KB Management,
- Spouse: Joyce Gottlieb (deceased)
- Children: Jack Black; Jill Black Zalben; Janis Black Warner
- Parent(s): Jack Black; Victoria Black

Stanley Black (born 1932) is an American real estate investor and philanthropist from Beverly Hills, California. He is the founder and chairman of the Black Equities Group. Through his company, he is the owner of 18 million square feet of commercial real estate in 35 states.

== Early life ==
Stanley Black was born to a Jewish family in 1932. His father, Jack Black, led the Textile Division at the United Jewish Fund. His mother, Victoria Black, was a philanthropist. The Jack and Victoria Black Parkway at the Vista Del Mar Child and Family Services, a non-profit organization which helps struggling families, was named in their honor. His father died when he was twenty-one years old.

== Career ==
He started his career at the Buckeye Realty & Management Corporation, a real estate development company founded by George Konheim. In 1955, he co-founded KB Management, a construction company, with Arthur Kaplan, a friend of his father's. It later became a real estate development company with over $375 million in holdings. The firm closed down in 1985, when Arthur Kaplan died. In 1985, Black and his son Jack founded the Black Equities Group, a real estate investment company. Through the company, he owns more than 18 million square feet of commercial real estate in thirty-five American states. Some of his tenants are Wendy's, Burger King and Office Depot.

He has published five editions of Thoughts to Live By, a booklet with eighty sayings of business advice.

== Philanthropy ==
Black is a donor to Jewish organizations. He serves on the board of trustees of the Los Angeles ORT College, a non-profit two-year Jewish college part of World ORT, where the American ORT Stanley and Joyce Black Family Building is named for he and his wife. He has made charitable contributions to the City of Hope, the Anti-Defamation League, Jewish Big Brothers, the American Friends of Tel Aviv University, the American Friends of the Hebrew University, The Guardians of the Jewish Home for the Aging, and Yeshiva Gedolah/Michael Diller High School. He also co-chaired a fundraiser for the Friends of the Israel Defense Forces at the Beverly Hilton Hotel. He has donated to the Boy Scouts of America, the Los Angeles Music Center, and the Union Rescue Mission. Moreover, he is a large supporter of the Jewish Vocational Services, a non-profit organization which helps Jews who are unemployed in Southern California find work again. Additionally, he helped establish the Goldsmith Center of the Jewish Federation of Greater Los Angeles. In June 2016, he unveiled a new Torah he commissioned in Israel for the Temple of the Arts, a synagogue based at the Saban Theatre in Beverly Hills.

Black has supported healthcare organizations. In 2000, he donated US$1 million to the Vista Del Mar Child and Family Services for the establishment of the Joyce and Stanley Black Family Special Care Facility. In January 2012, he donated US$5 more million, which led to the Joyce and Stanley Black Family Campus. In 2004, he made a large donation to the Children's Hospital Los Angeles (CHLA), which renamed its garden the Joyce and Stanley Black and Family Healing and Meditation Garden. In 2013, he donated another US$15 million to the CHLA. As a result, the former Gateway Building facing Sunset Boulevard was renamed the Joyce and Stanley Black Family Building. In September 2014, and again on September 27, 2015, he held fundraisers for Wells Bring Hope, a non-profit organization which drills wells in Niger to bring water to rural communities. He has been a long-term supporter of the Chai Center in Los Angeles, and will serve as the 'Dinner Chair' for the Chai Center's annual Banquet in 2018.

== Personal life ==
He was married to Joyce Black, the daughter of Jacob and Frieda Gottlieb. A philanthropist, she served on the board of trustees of the Los Angeles Opera. They had three children: Jack Black; Jill Black Zalben; and Janis Black Warner. He resides in Beverly Hills, California.
