= Children's Hospital Los Angeles =

Hospital in Los Angeles, California, U.S.

- Keck School of Medicine of USC

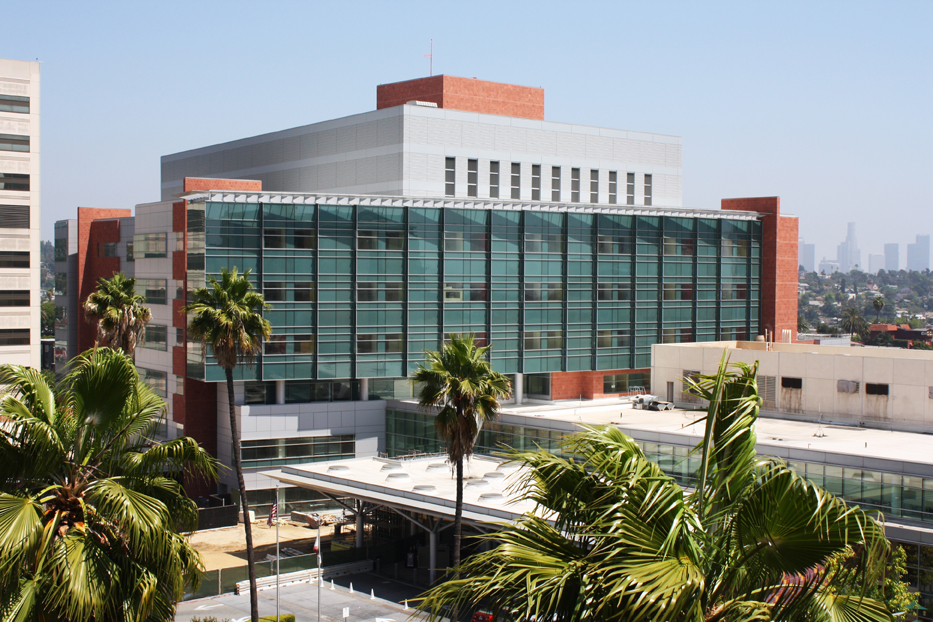

- Location within the Los Angeles metropolitan area Location within California Location within the United States

Geography
- Location: 4650 Sunset Boulevard, Los Angeles, California, U.S.
- Coordinates: 34°05′51″N 118°17′26″W

Organisation
- Care system: Private
- Type: Children's
- Affiliated university: Keck School of Medicine of USC

Services
- Emergency department: Level I Pediatric Trauma Center
- Beds: 495

History
- Founded: 1901

Links
- Website: www.chla.org
- Lists: Hospitals in U.S.

Children's Hospital Los Angeles (CHLA) is a nationally ranked, freestanding acute care children's hospital in the East Hollywood district of Los Angeles, on Sunset Boulevard at the corner of Vermont Avenue. The hospital has been academically affiliated with the Keck School of Medicine of the University of Southern California since 1932 and the hospital features 401 pediatric beds. The hospital provides comprehensive pediatric specialties and subspecialties to infants, children, teens, and young adults generally aged 0–21 throughout California and the west coast. The hospital also sometimes treats adults that require pediatric care. The hospital has a rooftop helipad and is an ACS verified level I pediatric trauma center, one of a few in the region. The hospital features a regional pediatric intensive-care unit and an American Academy of Pediatrics verified level IV neonatal intensive care unit.

U.S. News & World Report ranks CHLA as the fifth best children's hospital in the United States and the best in California. It has also received Magnet Recognition from the American Nurses Credentialing Center.

== About ==
While most of the children admitted come from Los Angeles County, others come from the seven-county area near Los Angeles that includes Kern, Orange, Riverside, San Bernardino, San Luis Obispo, Santa Barbara and Ventura counties. Additional referrals come from elsewhere around the world.

CHLA also has five outpatient specialty centers (located in Arcadia, Encino, Santa Monica, South Bay/Torrance, Glendale, and Valencia), as well as dozens of specialty physician offices across the Los Angeles Area.

The hospital does not turn away patients regardless of socioeconomic status or insurance coverage.

The president and CEO is Paul S. Viviano, who joined the institution in August 2015.

In November 2020, Dwayne "The Rock" Johnson collaborated with Microsoft and billionaire Bill Gates to donate Xbox Series X consoles to Children's Hospital Los Angeles along with 19 other children's hospitals throughout the country.

== Research and education ==
Children's Hospital Los Angeles is home to The Saban Research Institute (TSRI), one of the largest and most productive pediatric research centers in the Western United States. The institution conducts laboratory, clinical, translational and community research designed to investigate the developmental origins of health and disease. More than 400 faculty collaborate to combat cancer, heart disease, brain disorders, autism, obesity and diabetes, among other devastating pediatric conditions. The hospital is the eighth most productive center in the nation, as measured by its funding levels from the National Institutes of Health—which provides highly competitive grants to researchers.

Training programs include 364 medical students, 277 student shadowers, 93 full-time residents, three chief residents and 127 fellows. For the past 19 years, 96 percent of those graduating from the CHLA Residency Program passed the American Board of Pediatrics exam on the first attempt, well above the national average of 75 to 80 percent.

In 2013, Stanley Black donated $15 million to fund research and clinical care programs; CHLA's Gateway Building was renamed the Joyce and Stanley Black Family Building.

The hospital has been academically affiliated with the Keck School of Medicine of the University of Southern California since 1932. Physician leaders all hold faculty appointments at USC.

== Sunset Bridge ==
Children's Hospital Los Angeles has a bridge that crosses Sunset Boulevard, an iconic thoroughfare that traverses Hollywood and a major section of Los Angeles. The bridge connects the north and south sides of the hospital's main campus.

The 40-ton, 117-foot-long walkway bridge was bolted into place above Sunset Boulevard between Vermont Avenue and Rodney Drive in October 2012 and was dedicated in March 2013.

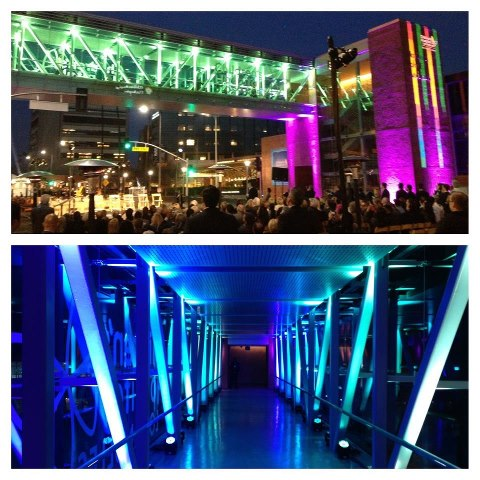

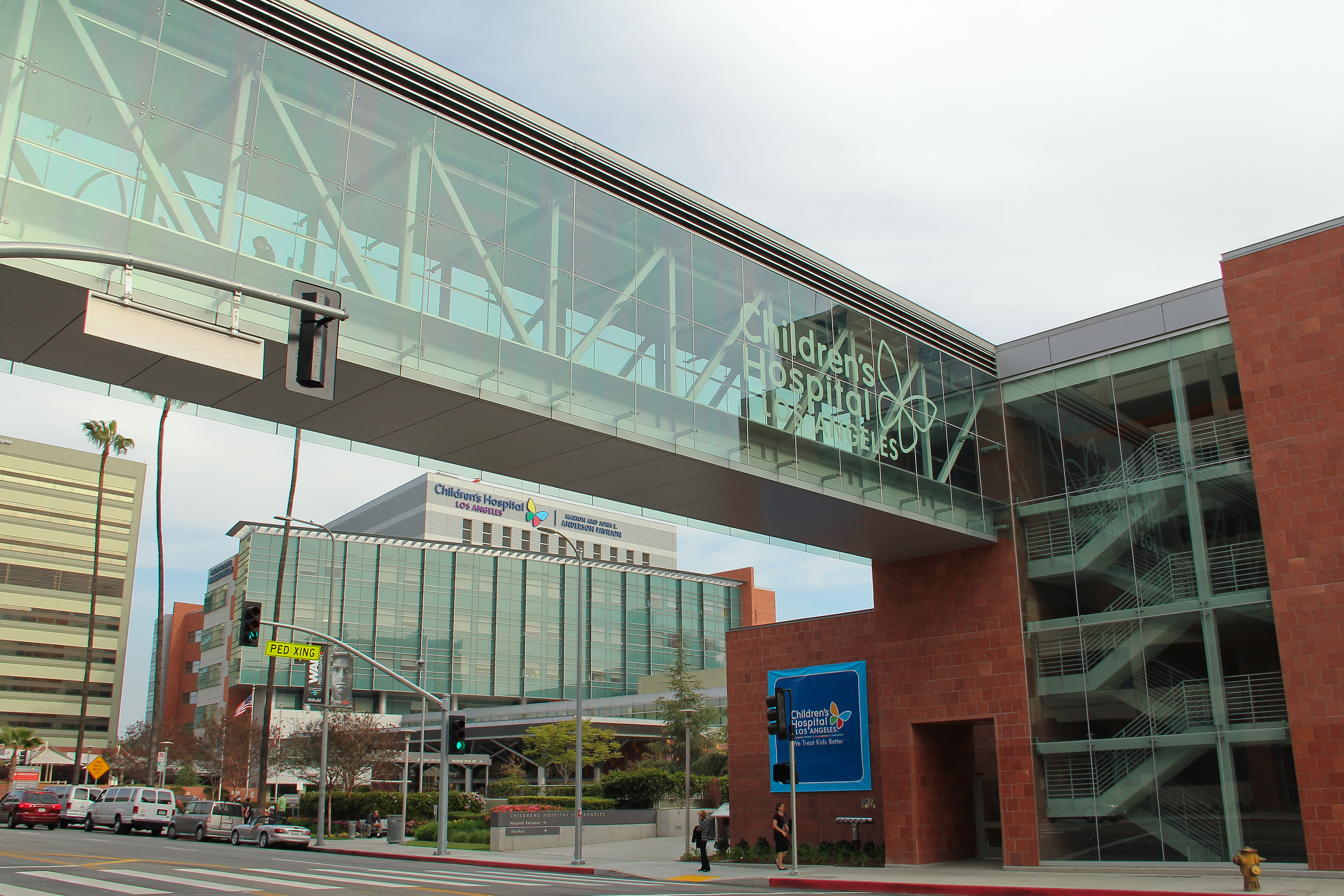

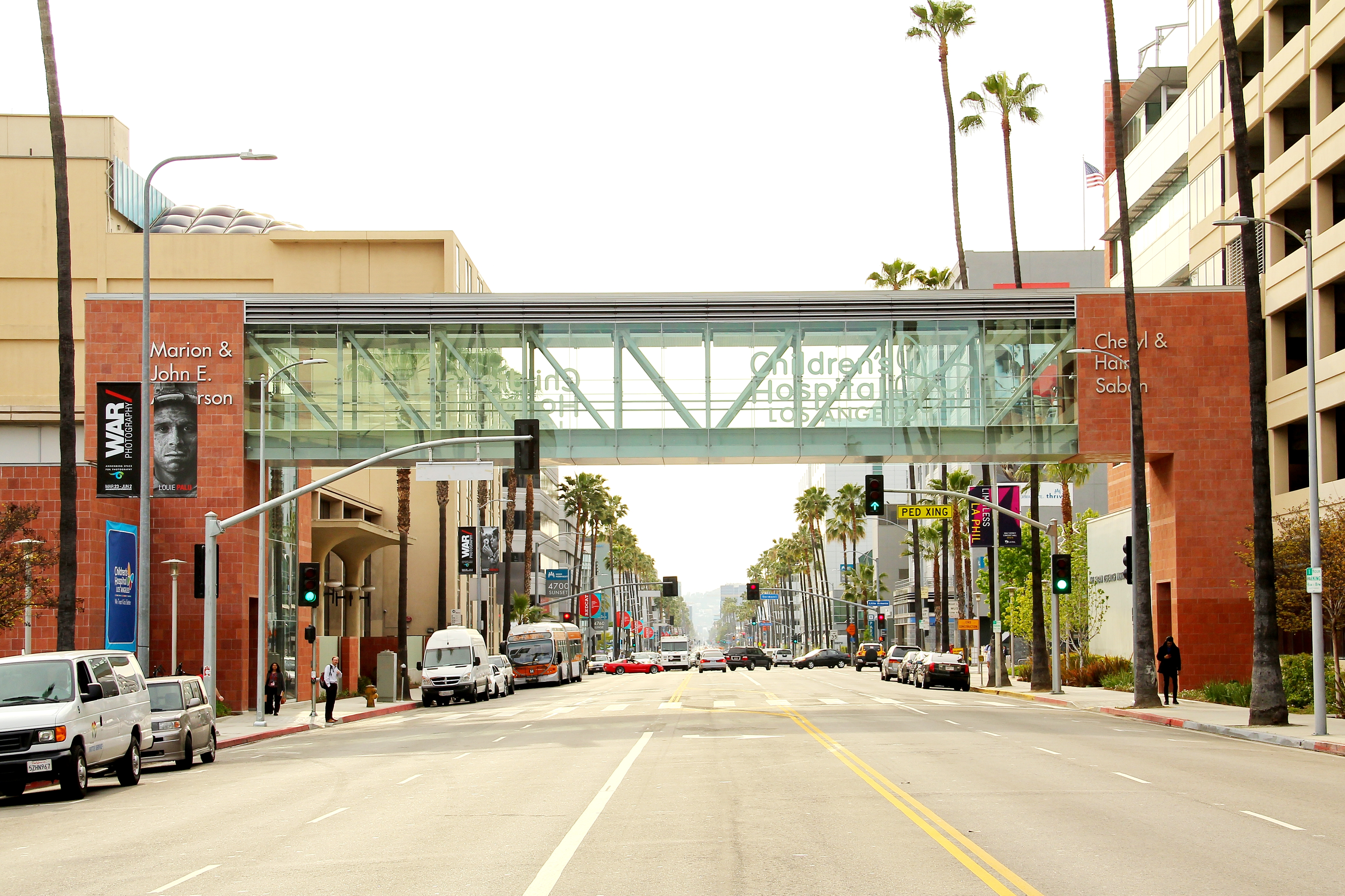

Construction of the Los Angeles city landmark was jointly supported by two of Los Angeles' most significant philanthropists, Cheryl Saban, PhD, and Marion Anderson, who, along with their spouses Haim Saban and the late John Edward Anderson, jointly funded the $10 million project.

== Awards ==
Children's Hospital Los Angeles is rated by U.S. News & World Report as a Best Children's Hospital and is ranked in all 11 specialties listed by the report.

On the 2020-21 rankings the hospital was ranked as the #5 best children's hospital in the United States by U.S. News & World Report on the publications' honor roll list.

2021-22 U.S. News & World Report Rankings for Children's Hospital Los Angeles
Specialty	Rank (In the U.S.)	Score (Out of 100)
Neonatology	#2	94.8
Pediatric Cancer	#7	94.2
Pediatric Cardiology and Heart Surgery	#3	90.7
Pediatric Diabetes & Endocrinology	#8	83.5
Pediatric Gastroenterology & GI Surgery	#6	93.9
Pediatric Nephrology	#15	79.7
Pediatric Neurology & Neurosurgery	#9	88.6
Pediatric Orthopedics	#4	90.3
Pediatric Pulmonology & Lung Surgery	#12	85.4
Pediatric Urology	#16	71.6

== Controversy ==
On February 4, 2025, Children's Hospital Los Angeles halted initiating gender-affirming hormone therapy for transgender patients under the age of 19, following an executive order by President Donald Trump seeking to stop gender-affirming care for transgender youth nationwide. The move by CHLA sparked street protests outside the hospital on Sunset Boulevard, and the office of the Attorney General of California Rob Bonta warned the hospital in a letter that withholding services from transgender individuals on the basis of gender identity constituted a prohibited form of discrimination under California law. CHLA later reversed course on February 21, 2025, removing the restrictions it had imposed on hormone therapy for patients under 19, but the hospital did not resume offering gender-affirming surgery for patients under 19, which it had also previously halted.

In June 2025, CHLA announced that it was shutting down its Center for Transyouth Health and Development, thereby terminating care for nearly 3,000 patients served by the Center, a move which CHLA attributed to financial pressure from the second Trump administration.

== Notable patients ==
- Gabriel Fernandez (February 20, 2005 – May 24, 2013) — American boy who was abused and tortured by parents.
- Genie (born 1957) — feral child who was abused, beaten, and neglected by parents.

== Notable staff ==
- Scott E. Fraser — professor
- Marion Jorgensen (March 18, 1912 – June 18, 2008) — honorary trustee who served on the board of colleagues

== See also ==
- Keck School of Medicine of USC
- UCLA Mattel Children's Hospital
- List of children's hospitals in the United States
