= Ralph A. Vaughn =

American architect

- Born: Ralph Augustine Vaughn; April 24, 1907; Washington, D.C.
- Died: October 21, 2000 (aged 93); Stockton, California
- Education: Armstrong Technical High School
- Alma mater: University of Illinois at Urbana–Champaign
- Occupations: Academic, architect, film set designer
- Spouse: Elizabeth Estelle Christmas Fry
- Children: Ronald Fry Vaughn
- Parent(s): Roscoe I. Vaughn; Mary Elizabeth (Waring) Vaughn

Ralph A. Vaughn (1907–2000) was an African-American academic, architect and film set designer. Born in Washington, D.C., he was an assistant professor at Howard University before moving to Los Angeles, California, where he designed many buildings, houses and a synagogue. He was also a film set designer. He was one of the first African-American architects in Los Angeles.

== Early life ==
Ralph Augustine Vaughn was born on April 24, 1907, in Washington, D.C. His father, Roscoe I. Vaughn, was a teacher and architect in Washington, D.C. He had three siblings.

Vaughn was educated at the Armstrong Technical High School, where his father taught, graduating in 1925. He attended Howard University, a historically black college, but took a year off and transferred to the University of Illinois at Urbana–Champaign, where he received a Bachelor of Science degree in architecture in 1932. He was in the same classes as William Pereira and Charles Luckman, both of whom became prominent architects. He founded the Pi Psi chapter of Omega Psi Phi, an African-American fraternity. He attended graduate school at the University of Michigan in Ann Arbor in the summer of 1932.

== Career ==
Vaughn worked as a draftsman for Albert Cassell, another African-American architect who designed buildings on the campus of Howard University. He then worked as a draftsman for the United States Department of Agriculture Resettlement Administration for two years. He also worked as a consultant for Hilyard Robinson.

He became a tenured assistant professor in 1935. Meanwhile, he was hired by Paul R. Williams, another African-American architect and fellow member of Omega Psi Phi, as a chief craftsman for the Langston Terrace Dwellings.

He moved to Los Angeles in 1937 to work full-time for Williams. During that time, he helped design the Saks Fifth Avenue store and the MCA Inc. headquarters in Beverly Hills. He also helped design the private residences of actors Bert Lahr, Tyrone Power and Bill Robinson. He was made redundant four years later, in 1941, as architectural commissions came to a standstill when the United States joined the war effort.

He worked as a set designer for Metro-Goldwyn-Mayer alongside Cedric Gibbons from 1941 to 1945. For example, he helped design the set of Kismet, a 1944 film starring Marlene Dietrich. He also helped design the sets of A Guy Named Joe in 1943, Thirty Seconds Over Tokyo in 1944, The Last Time I Saw Paris in 1954.

In 1945, Vaughn started an architectural firm with John C. Lindsey. They designed private residences in Los Angeles, Sherman Oaks and Catalina Island.

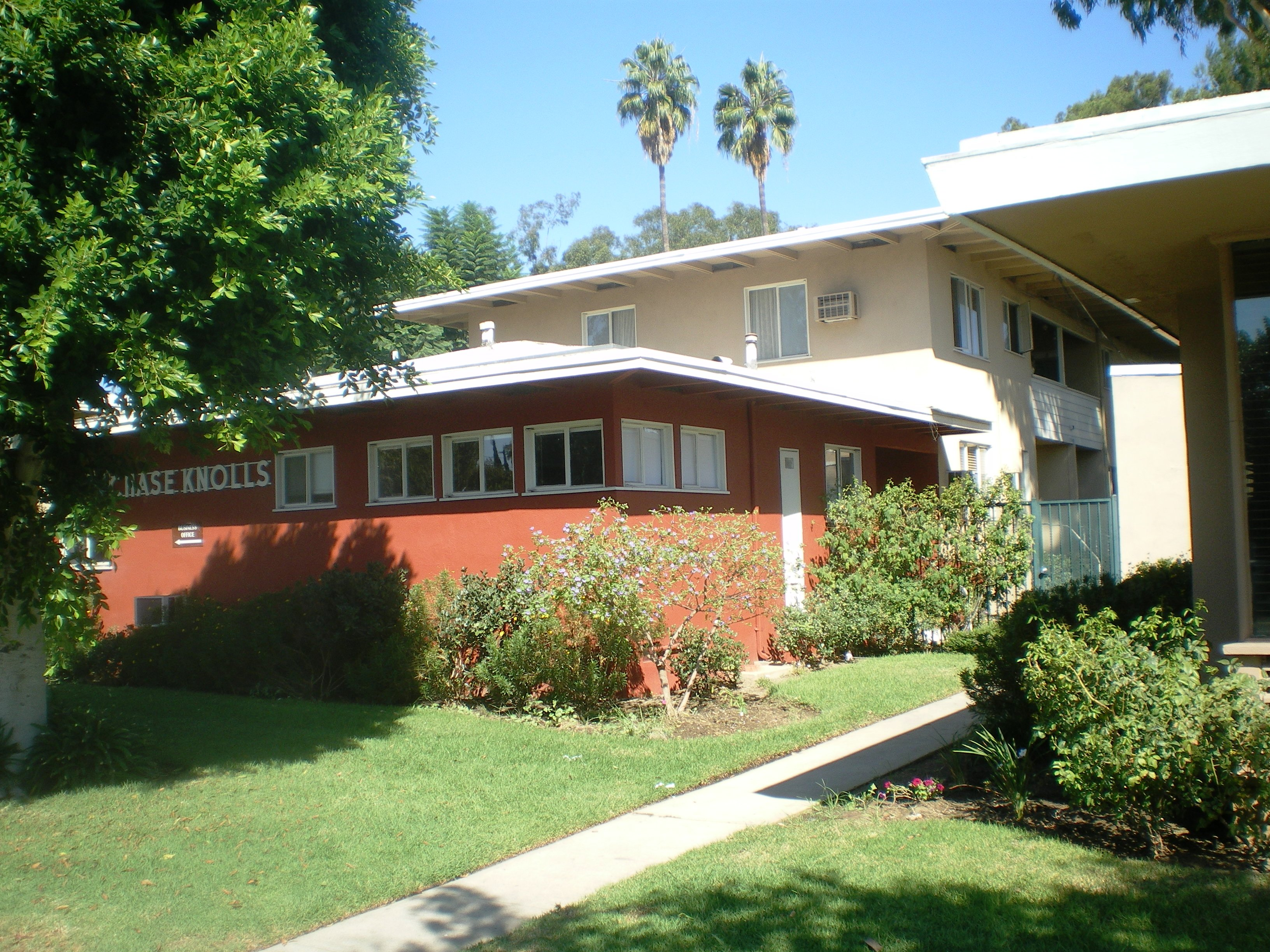
Chase Knoll Apartments, Sherman Oaks, California.

With Heth Wharton (1892–1958), he designed the North Hollywood Manor in North Hollywood and the Chase Knolls Apartments in Sherman Oaks in 1950. The latter is listed as a Los Angeles Historic-Cultural Monument. A year later, in 1951, they designed Lincoln Place Apartment Homes in Venice, Los Angeles, a residential complex which includes fifty-two buildings. It has been described as one of his "best-known extant projects."

Vaughn was appointed to the Los Angeles Building and Safety Commission in 1953. He was a member of the Archaeological Institute of America, the National Society of Interior Decorators, the American Association for the Advancement of Science and the Smithsonian Institution. He was a founding member of the Society of American Registered Architects. After designing the new building for Temple Beth Am, a Conservative synagogue, in 1959, he received an award from them.

Vaughn designed the Schwab's Pharmacy on Sunset Boulevard and the buildings of the San Marcos Golf Club in San Marcos, California. He restored the Watts Towers in the later 1970s.

== Personal life and death ==
Vaughn married Elizabeth Estelle Christmas Fry in 1935. She worked as a librarian. They had a son, Ronald Fry Vaughn.

Vaughn retired in Stockton, California, in 1998. He died two years later, on October 21, 2000.
