= Heth Wharton =

American architect

- Born: April 18, 1892
- Died: October 28, 1958
- Occupation: Architect

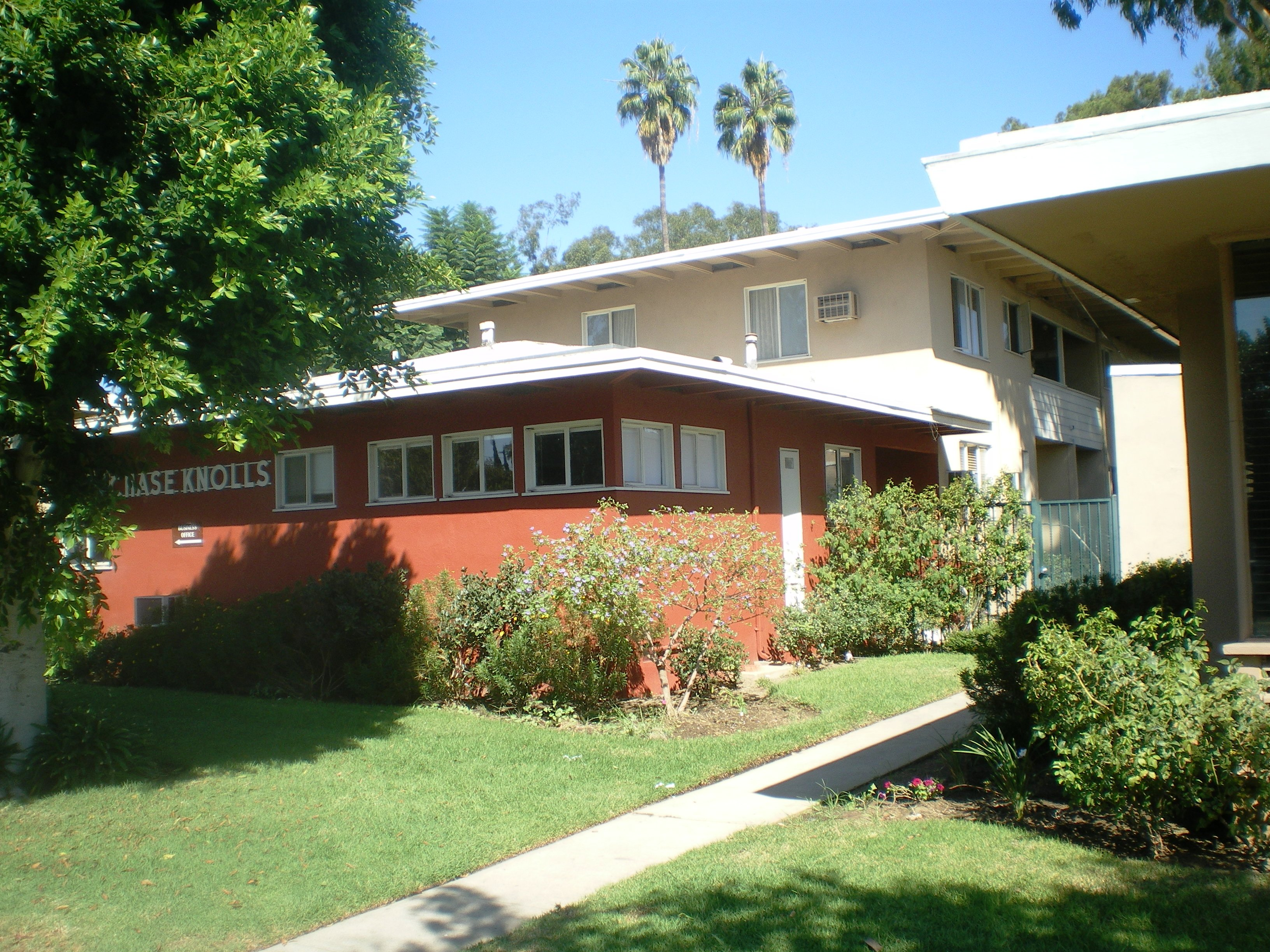
Chase Knolls, designed by Vaughn and Wharton.

Heth Wharton (April 18, 1892 – October 28, 1958) was an American architect. He grew up in Virginia, and he was a draughtsman for Hunt & Chambers. With architect Ralph A. Vaughn, he designed Chase Knolls Apartments in Sherman Oaks and Lincoln Place in Venice.

Wharton was involved in a legal dispute with film director John Cromwell and actress Kay Johnson when he tried to overcharge them for a house he designed for them in 1934; the couple won the lawsuit.
