= Temple Beth Am =

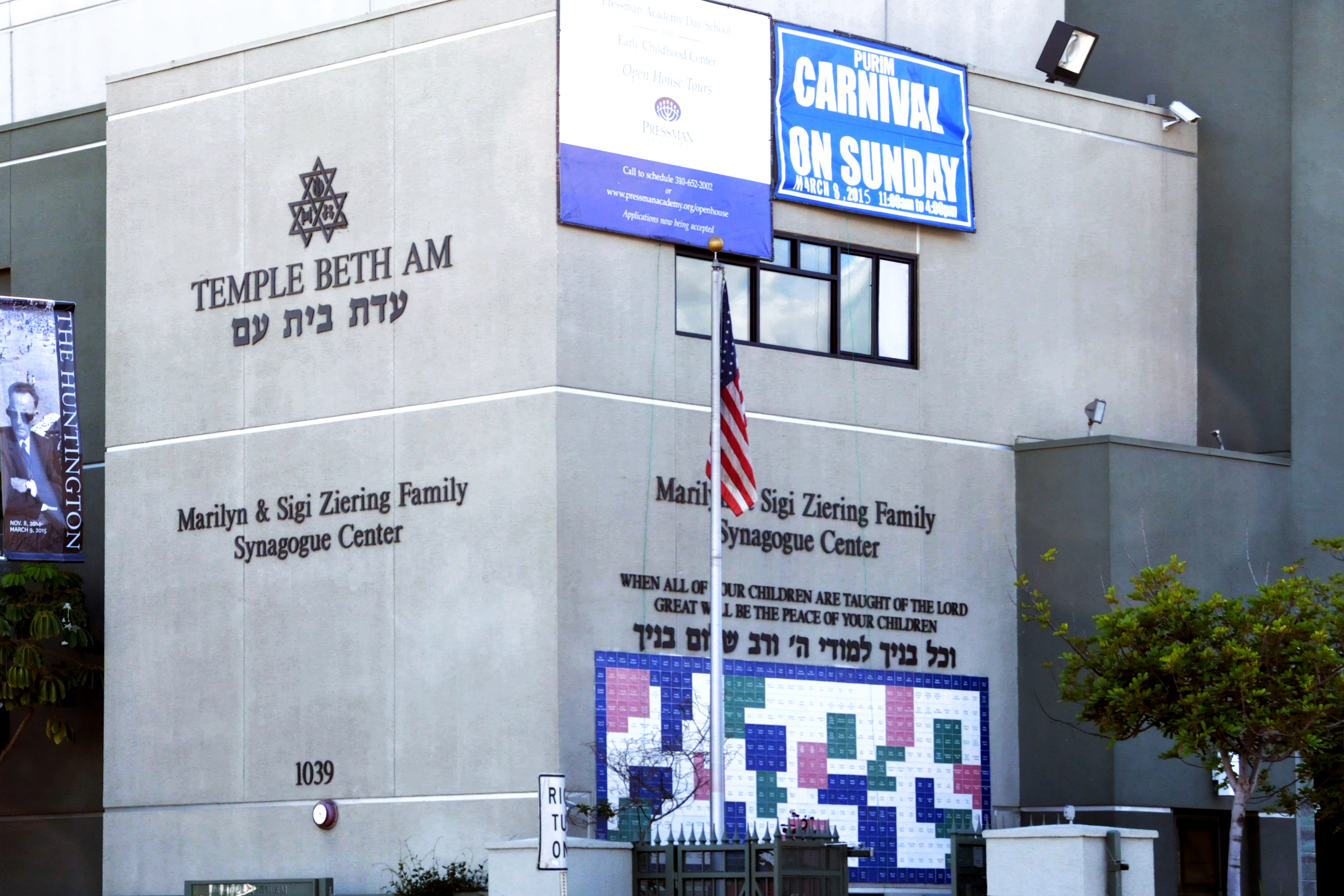
- Temple Beth Am, in 2015

- Location in Los Angeles

Religion
- Affiliation: Conservative Judaism
- Ecclesiastical or organizational status: Synagogue
- Leadership: Rabbi Adam Kligfeld
- Status: Active

Location
- Location: Corner of Olympic Boulevard and La Cienega Boulevard, Los Angeles, California
- Country: United States
- Interactive map of Temple Beth Am
- Coordinates: 34.05823°N 118.37658°W

Architecture
- Architect: Ralph A. Vaughn
- Type: Synagogue
- Style: Modernist
- Established: 1935 (as a congregation)
- Completed: 1959 (existing location)

Website
- tbala.org

Temple Beth Am (Hebrew: בית עם, “House of the People”; formerly the Olympic Jewish Center) is a Conservative synagogue located on the corner of Olympic Boulevard and La Cienega Boulevard, just south of Beverly Hills, in Los Angeles, California, in the United States. Founded in 1935, it moved into a new building designed by one of the earliest African-American architects in Los Angeles, Ralph A. Vaughn, in 1959. The synagogue’s current clergy include Senior Rabbi Adam Kligfeld, Associate Rabbi Rebecca Schatz, and Cantor Rabbi Hillary Chorny.

== History ==
Temple Beth Am was founded in 1935 as the Olympic Jewish Center. It is the third oldest Conservative synagogue in Los Angeles.

Jacob Pressman served as its rabbi from 1950 to 1985. Under his leadership, the synagogue took its current name, Temple Beth Am in 1957.

The congregation has received significant donations from Holocaust survivor Sigi Ziering and his wife Marilyn, and the building has been named in their honor.

In 2012, the Sefer Torah nearly fell to the ground during a service. As this is seen a traumatic event in the Jewish faith, rabbi Adam Kligfeld requested that members of the congregation share among themselves forty days of fasting to recover.

== Notable members ==
- George Konheim, real estate developer
