= Jacob Pressman =

American rabbi (1919-2015)

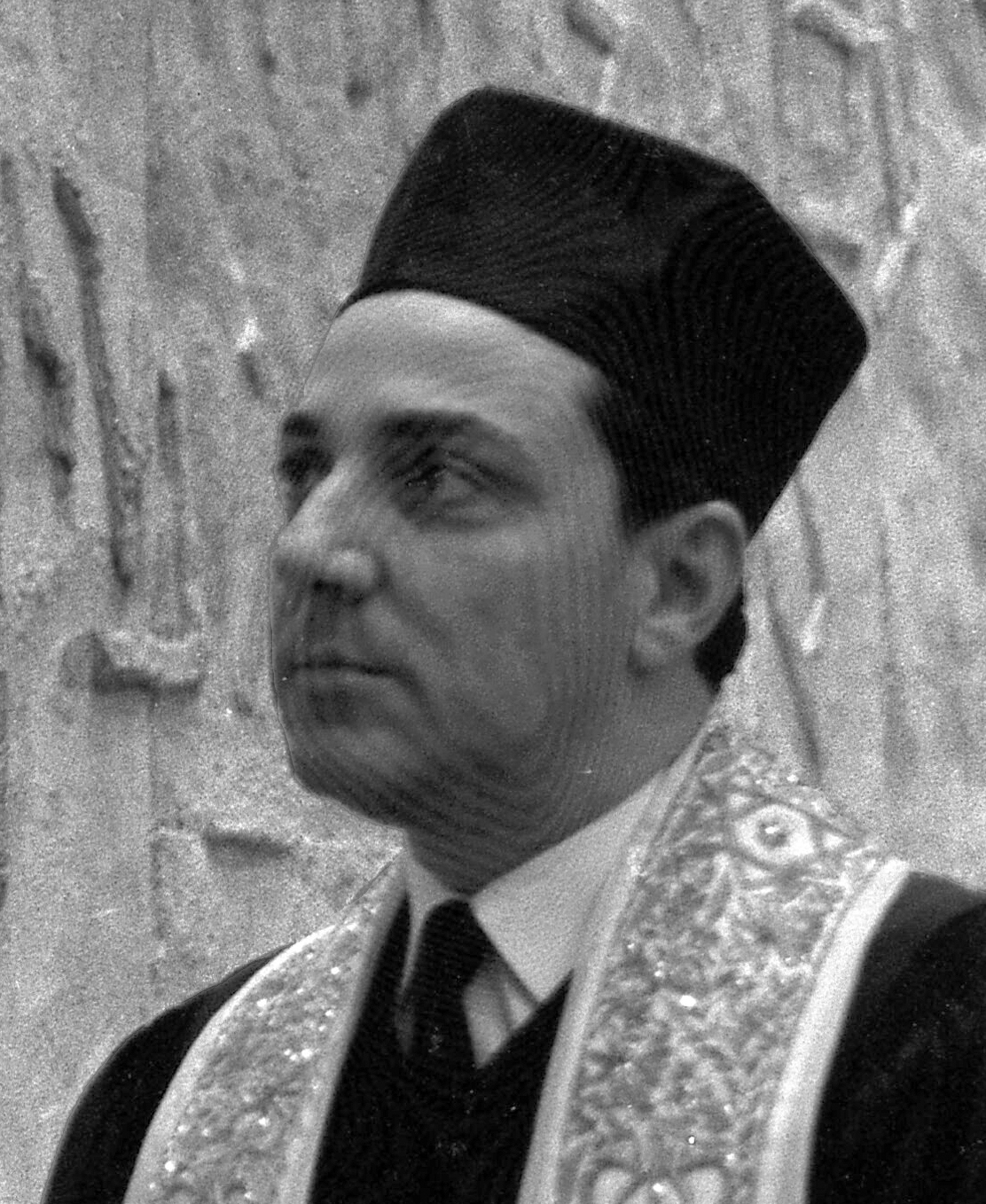
- Pressman in 1966
- Born: October 26, 1919; Philadelphia, Pennsylvania, U.S.
- Died: October 1, 2015 (aged 95); Los Angeles, California, U.S.
- Education: University of Pennsylvania; Jewish Theological Seminary of America
- Occupations: Rabbi; columnist
- Spouse(s): Marjorie Steinberg (m. 1942; died 2013)
- Children: 3

Jacob "Jack" Pressman (October 26, 1919 – October 1, 2015) was an American Conservative rabbi. He served as the rabbi of Temple Beth Am in Los Angeles, California, from 1950 to 1985. He was a co-founder of the American Jewish University in Bel Air. He penned a weekly column in The Beverly Hills Courier, from 2004 to 2015.

== Early life ==
Jacob Pressman was born on October 26, 1919, in Philadelphia, Pennsylvania. His father was Solomon Pressman, and his mother, Dora (Levin), was a Pressman. Raised in the Jewish faith, he attended Temple Beth Am in Philadelphia.

Pressman graduated from the University of Pennsylvania in 1940, where he received a Bachelor of Arts degree. He attended the Jewish Theological Seminary of America and was ordained as a conservative rabbi in 1945.

== Career ==
Pressman served as rabbi at Forest Hills Jewish Center in Queens, New York City, from 1944 to 1946. In 1946, he moved to Los Angeles, California, where he first served as associate rabbi at Sinai Temple until 1950. At the time, the senior rabbi was Jacob Kohn (or Cohen).

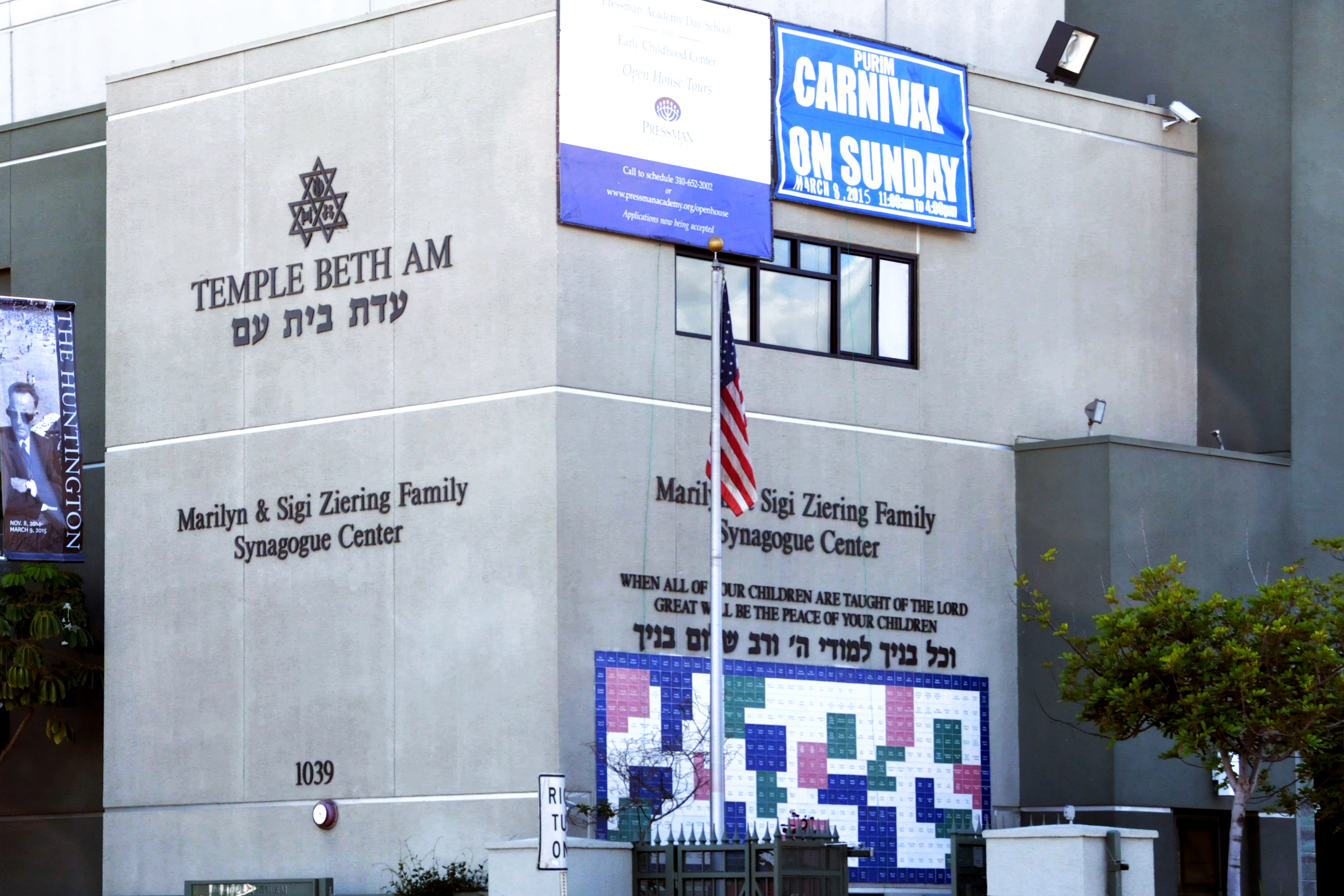
Temple Beth Am in 2015

In 1950, he became rabbi of the Olympic Jewish Center. It was renamed Temple Beth Am in 1957. Pressman established Beth Am Manor, a low-rent residence for senior citizens as well as the Rabbi Jacob Pressman Academy, a combination of nursery, elementary and secondary schools connected to the synagogue.

Pressman spearheaded the 'Save Soviet Jewry' campaign in 1964, leading to greater awareness of the plight of the Jews in the Soviet Union. This in turn led to more immigration of Soviet Jews to Israel. Moreover, he joined Martin Luther King Jr. in the Selma to Montgomery marches in 1965.

Pressman served as President of the Western Region of the Rabbinical Assembly and Chairman of its convention in 1979. Additionally, he served as President of the Board of Rabbis of Los Angeles. He served on the Executive Council of the Jewish Federation of Greater Los Angeles. He was also Chair of the Los Angeles campaign for Israel Bonds. He was involved with the United Jewish Appeal.

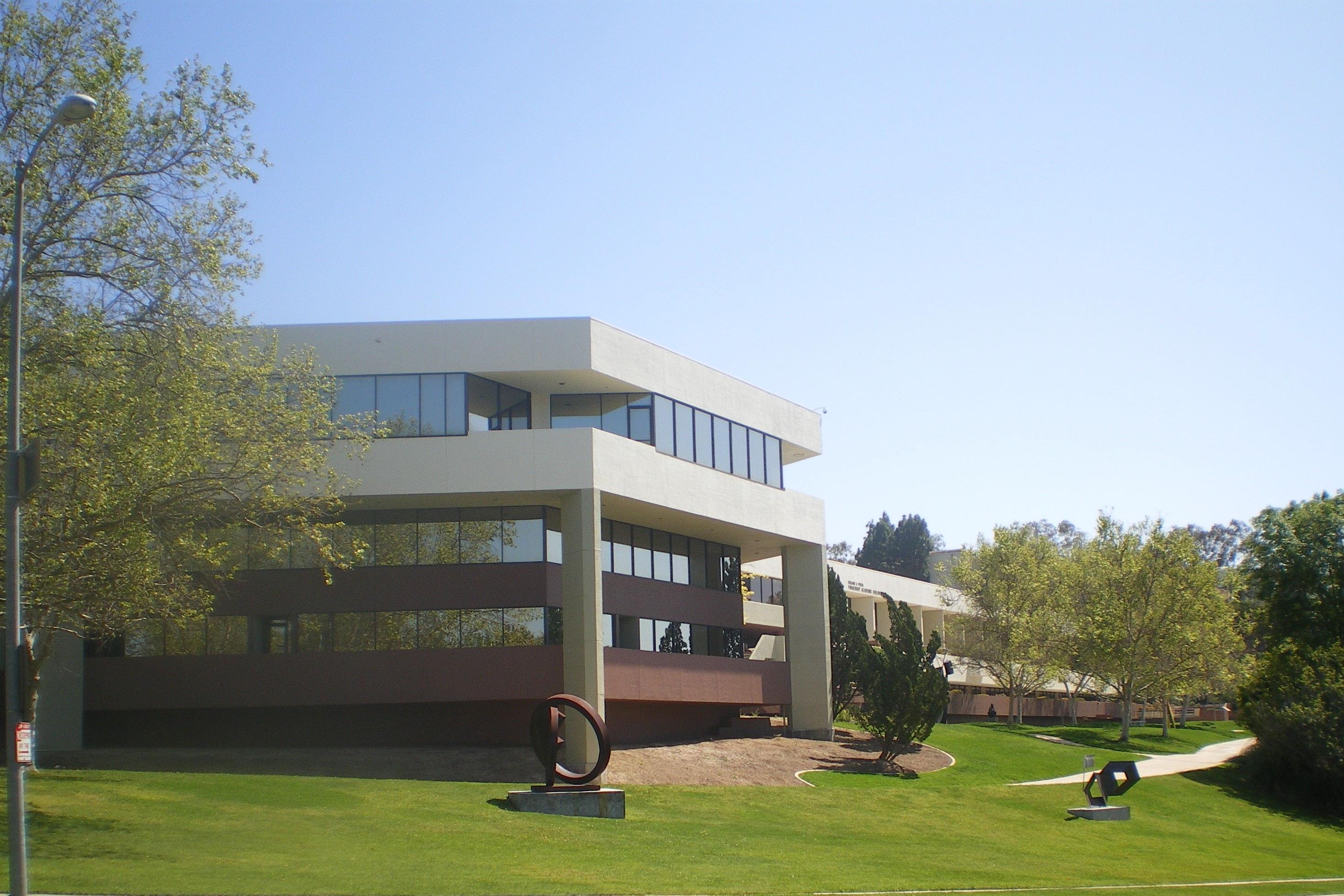
American Jewish University in Bel Air, co-founded by Rabbi Jacob Pressman.

Pressman spearheaded the establishment of Camp Ramah in California, a summer camp in Ojai. He was a co-founder of the Brandeis-Bardin Camp Institute. He served as Chairman of the Los Angeles Zionist Youth Commission. He played a critical role in the founding of the Los Angeles Hebrew High School. He was a co-founder of the University of Judaism, later known as the American Jewish University (AJU), located in Bel Air. He was a recipient of the 2004 Rabbi Simon Greenberg Award from AJU.

Pressman was the founding President of the Maple Counseling Centre, a non-profit organization which offers free counseling sessions, based in Beverly Hills, California. He wrote a weekly column in The Beverly Hills Courier, as well as two books.

== Personal life ==
Pressman married Marjorie Steinberg in 1942. They resided in Beverly Hills, California. One of their sons, Joel, was a Performing Arts teacher and director of the Madrigal Singers at Beverly Hills High School from 1975 to 2013, and died from cancer in 2013. Their second son, Daniel, is a rabbi. They also had a daughter, Judith, who made Aliya to Israel and has been a pioneer of Ma'ale Tzvia community village in the Galilee.

== Death ==
Pressman died in Los Angeles on October 1, 2015. He was 95 years old. His funeral was held at Temple Beth Am, and he was buried at the Eden Memorial Park Cemetery, a Jewish cemetery in Mission Hills, Los Angeles.

== Bibliography ==
- This Wild and Crazy World as Seen From Beverly Hills by Rabbi Jack (1999).
- Dear Friends: A Prophetic Journey Through Great Events of the 20th Century (Hoboken, New Jersey: KTAV Publishing House, 2002).
