= Lincoln Place Apartment Homes =

- Lincoln Place Apartments
- U.S. National Register of Historic Places
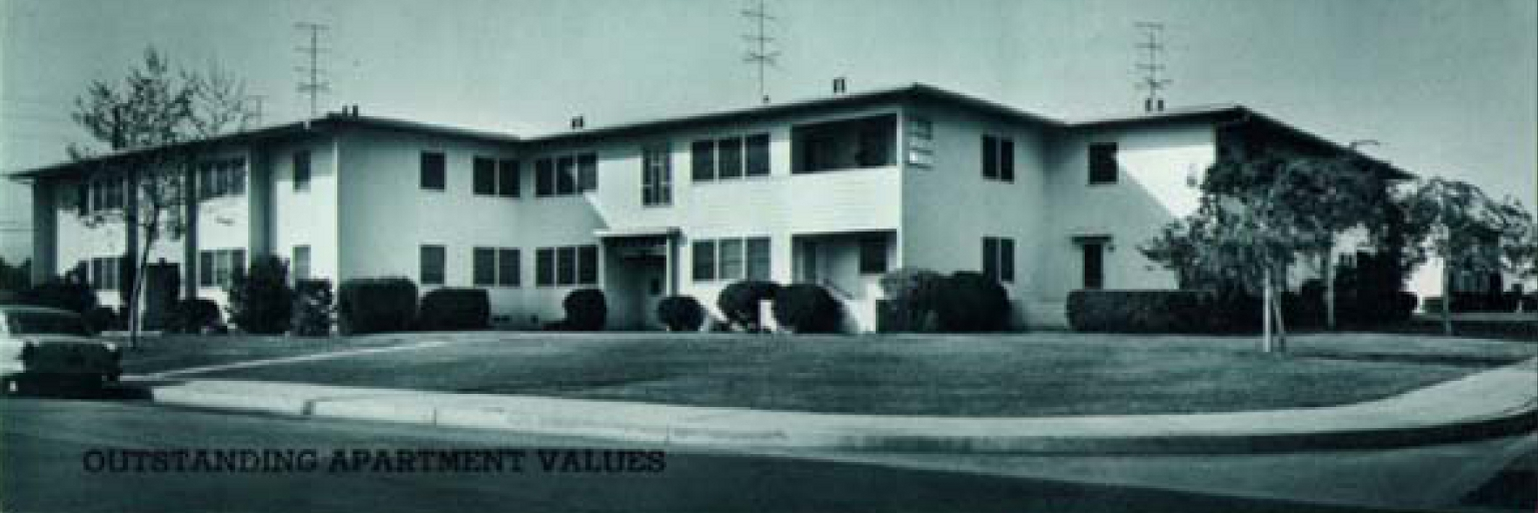
- Lincoln Place Gardens on a 1959 brochure

- Location within the Los Angeles metropolitan area Location within California Location within the United States
- Location: Lake & Penmar Aves., Frederick St. & alley on the south, Venice, Los Angeles
- Coordinates: 34.001364°N 118.459479°W
- Area: 38 acres (15 ha)
- Built: 1951
- Architect: Wharton & Vaughn, Associates
- Architectural style: Modernist
- NRHP reference No.: 15000911
- Added to NRHP: December 22, 2015

Lincoln Place Apartment Homes is a historic apartment community owned by a subsidiary of Apartment Investment and Management Co. (Aimco). Inspired by the garden city movement, it is located at 1050 Frederick Street on a 35-acre site in the Venice community of Los Angeles, one mile east of Venice Beach. Built from 1949-1951, the property is just off Lincoln Boulevard, bound by Lake Street and Penmar Avenue with Elkgrove Avenue and Elkgrove Circle within its interior.

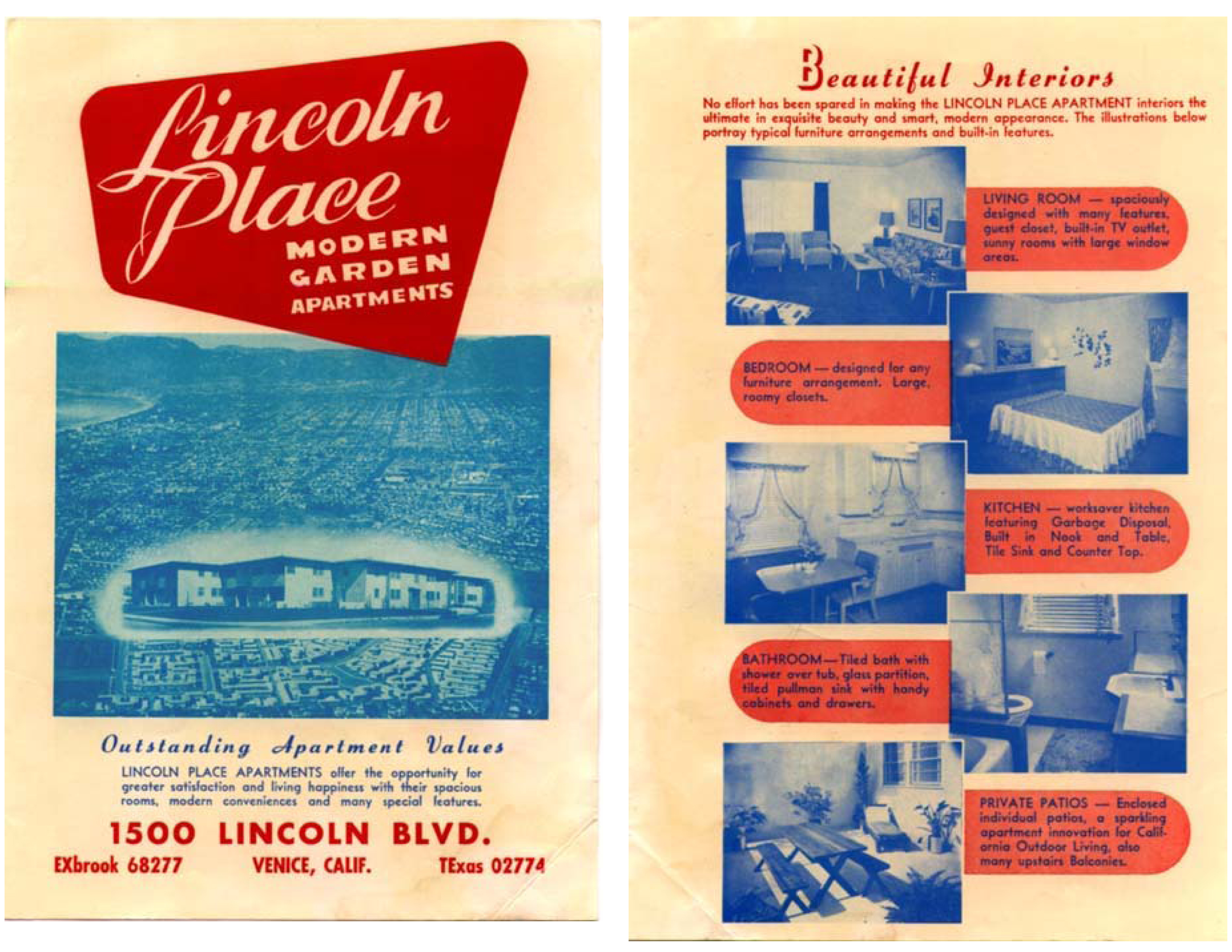
Lincoln Place Brochure from 1951: front

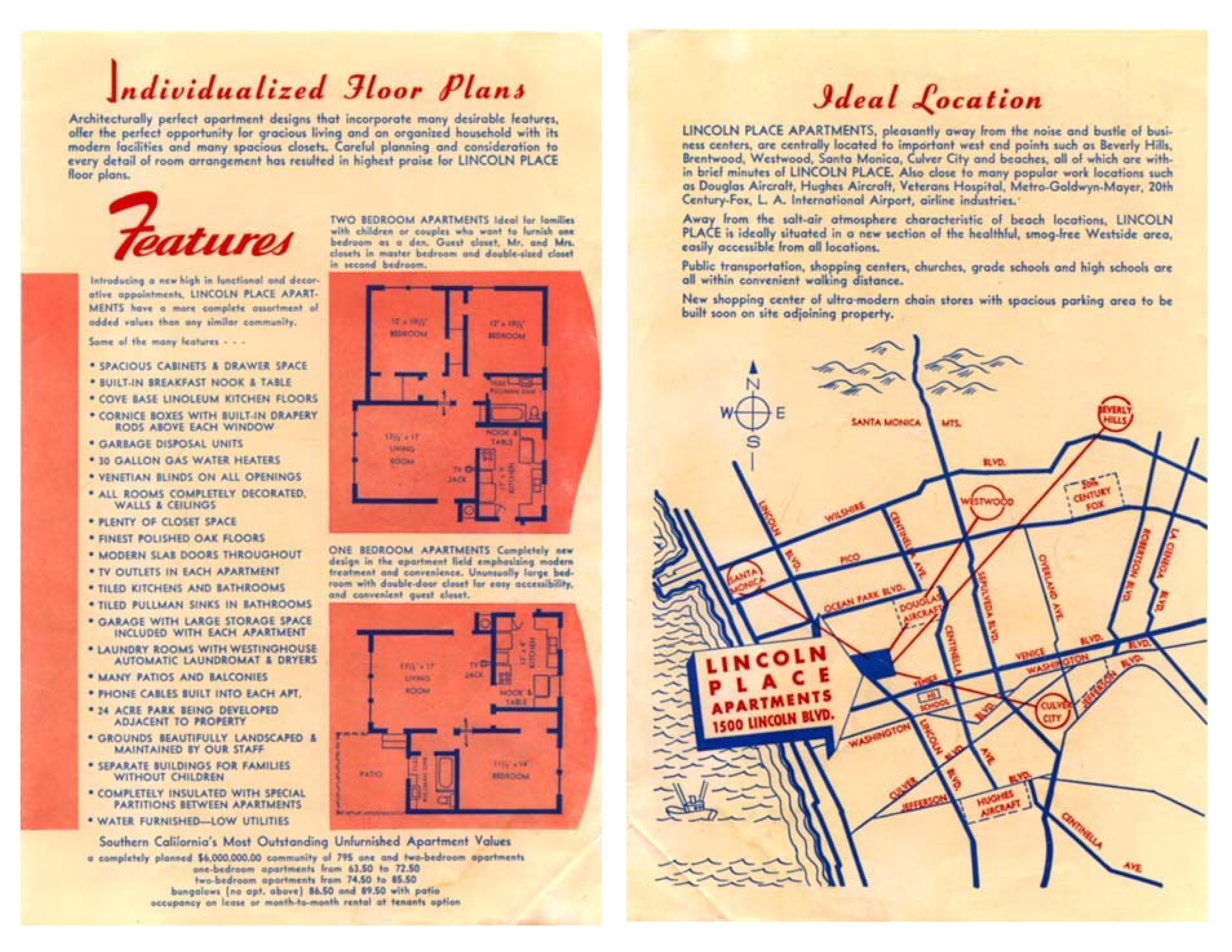
Lincoln Place Brochure from 1951: inside

== History ==
Lincoln Place Apartment Homes is an example of World War II- work force housing, financed under Section 608 Title VI of the National Housing Act of 1934. The community was originally built to house veterans returning from the War.

=== Housing Shortage ===
The passage of the G.I. Bill at end of World War II caused a housing shortage in the United States, with low- to middle-income families finding few rental property options. The Santa Monica Bay area was especially affected as the opening of Douglas Aircraft's plant in 1940 and the Los Angeles Airport in 1947 led to an increase in housing demand. To combat the housing issue, the Federal Housing Authority (FHA) “created a mortgage insurance program, whose low cost of lending and liberal valuation of land would encourage developers to meet this housing need.”

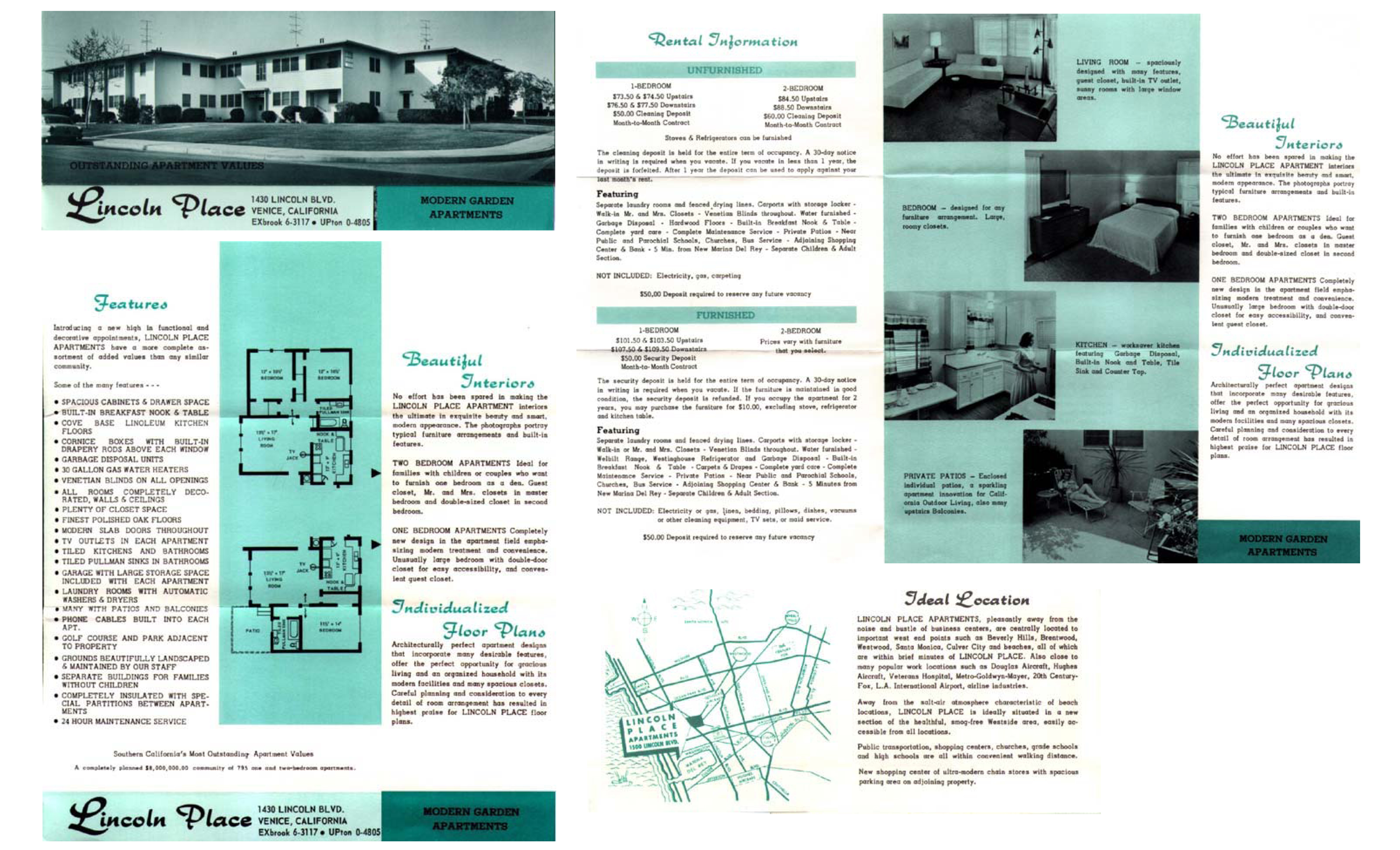
Lincoln Place Brochure from 1959

Ralph A. Vaughn (1907-2000), an architect trained at the University of Illinois, was the son of a prominent Washington D.C. architect, Roscoe I. Vaughn. Upon meeting Heth Wharton, they formed Wharton & Vaughn Associates, and were tasked with designing Lincoln Place.

Between 1951 and 1986, Lincoln Place was family-owned. In 1986, Lincoln Place was purchased by TransAction Companies, Ltd with Robert Bisno and James Coxeter as the two main partners. In 1990, Bisno announced a plan to raze Lincoln Place and develop condos on the site; however in 1996, the LA City Council rejected the development plan which resulted in Bisno filing suit against the city. In June 2001, Aimco became a 50% partner in Lincoln Place; and in August 2003, Aimco Venezia LLC, an Aimco affiliate became 100% owner of Lincoln Place Apartment Homes.

== Controversy ==
In September 2000, Bisno began a revised development plan which was to include the demolition of 2 buildings and the rehabilitation of the remaining 50. Approximately 300 families moved out of Lincoln Place during this time with vacant units taken off of the rental market. This was the largest Eviction in Los Angeles History, with only disabled and elderly allowed to remain.

In May 2002, Amanda Seward working with the Modern Committee of the LA Conservancy filed a nomination for Lincoln Place to be added to the National Register of Historic Places. In November of that same year, the City Council re-heard Bisno's condo proposal. Finding that there was “no substantial evidence” that Lincoln Place was an historic resource, Bisno's plan was approved. This sparked a lawsuit against the city by the Lincoln Place Tenants Association.

Bisno filed applications in January 2003 for five demolition permits but was rejected. He filed a suit against the Department of Building and Safety requesting permits under the Ellis Act. However, in February 2003, the State Historic Resources Commission determined Lincoln Place was eligible for the National Register. The commission forwarded the nomination and recommendation to the Keeper of the National Register, at which time the file was open for 45 days. During these 45 days, Bisno demolished two buildings. The Keeper returned the nomination asking for additional information.

In May 2003, permits were issued for five buildings along Lake Street. Several groups, including the California Preservation Foundation, LA Conservancy and the National Organization of Minority Architects (NOMA) filed suit against the City, citing the California Environmental Quality Act and the LA Municipal Code. They also unsuccessfully appealed the demolition permits with the Building and Safety Commission. A total of 99 units were demolished.

In November of that year, the LPTA lost its suit against the City; and in January the preservationists lost their case in trial court. Both groups appealed. In March 2004, Aimco began asbestos work related to redevelopment of the property. In July 2004, Amanda Seward submitted a nomination requesting that Lincoln Place be deemed eligible for the California Register of Historic Places. In March, 2004 the Court of Appeal issued an order to prevent further demolition of structures at Lincoln Place. From 2004 to 2006 Aimco relocated tenants in more than 250 units while providing alternative housing and relocation benefits. A number of tenants were able to become first time homebuyers as a result of receiving relocation benefits. In March 2005 Aimco filed a “Notice of Intent to Withdraw” the apartments from the rental market as permitted by the California Ellis Act. Tenants in 289 occupied units were served notices requiring tenants to vacate units within 120 days.

Evicted tenants filed a lawsuit, claiming that “Aimco violated conditions of the California Environmental Quality Act as well as an agreement with the city of L.A. to relocate tenants to other units or properties instead of evicting them.” The Second District Court of Appeals eventually ruled in the tenants’ favor. Of the 147 households engaged in the legal battles, many accepted relocation packages (including funds for moving expenses) offered by Aimco.

== Resolution ==
=== Historic designation ===
On August 4, 2005, the California State Historical Resources Commission declared that Lincoln Place was eligible to be placed on the California Register of Historical Resources. According to the Commission, Lincoln Place exemplified an "excellent enduring example of both the 'garden city' property type and of Modernist architecture." In addition, the Commission cited the unique site plan and observed that it was one of few surviving prominent examples of postwar middle-income residential architecture. Subsequently, Aimco applied to the National Park Service to be listed on the National Register of Historic Places. This listing was granted in December 2015.

=== Settlement ===
In May 2009, Aimco signed a settlement agreement with Amanda Seward and the 20th Century Architectural Alliance which settled and concluded all claims concerning Lincoln Place. The agreement requires that the Secretary of Interior's standards be followed for historic rehabilitation at Lincoln Place. A total of 696 units will be restored and 99 new units are to be constructed on vacant lots. In August, 2009 Aimco signed a settlement agreement with the former occupants of the site which allows up to 83 former tenants to return to Lincoln Place. 50 exercised their option to return.

In May 2010, the Los Angeles City Council approved a settlement reached between Aimco and the City which settled and concluded all claims in connection with Lincoln Place. The agreement includes City cooperation for permitting and support for funding to make Lincoln Place a model of sustainability and historic preservation.
