= Sigi Ziering =

American dramatist

- Born: Siegfried Ziering; March 20, 1928; Kassel, Germany
- Died: November 12, 2000 (aged 72); Los Angeles, California, US
- Resting place: Hillside Memorial Park Cemetery
- Education: Brooklyn College; Syracuse University
- Occupations: Business executive; industrial scientist; playwright; philanthropist
- Spouse: Marilyn Ziering
- Children: 4, including Amy Ziering
- Relatives: Herman Ziering (brother); Gil Kofman (son-in-law)

Sigi Ziering (March 20, 1928 – November 12, 2000) was a German-born American business executive, scientist, playwright, and philanthropist. A Holocaust survivor, he immigrated to the United States with his family, earned a doctorate in theoretical physics in 1958, and worked for a time as an industrial physicist. In 1973 he became president of the Diagnostic Products Corporation, a tiny startup company that was developing advanced tests used for medical diagnosis. By the time of Ziering's death, the company had 1700 employees and marketed more than 400 immunodiagnostic tests. In 2006, the company was acquired by Siemens for 1.86 billion dollars (US) and became a subsidiary, of Siemens Healthcare Diagnostics. In later life, Ziering was an active philanthropist in Los Angeles.

== Biography ==
=== Early life ===
Siegfried Ziering was born on March 20, 1928, in Kassel, Germany. He was the son of Isaac Ziering and Cilly Ziering (née Frisch); his father was Polish. He had a brother, Herman. His family was Jewish.

During World War II, his father escaped to England, but his mother and her two sons stayed in Germany. In 1941, the Nazis forced them to move to the Riga Ghetto in modern-day Riga, Latvia, alongside 1,000 Jews. Only twenty survived, including Sigi, his mother and his brother. By the end of the war, they were moved to a prison in Fuhlsbüttel. The Nazis took 10 Jews a day to the Bergen-Belsen concentration camp. They were later moved to the concentration camp in Kiel and forced into slave labor. In 1945, they were rescued by the Swedish Red Cross. Indeed, Count Bernadotte of Sweden had negotiated with Himmler to rescue a few thousand Jews for a few million dollars. They were first moved to Sweden and eventually to London, where they rejoined their father.

Ziering immigrated to New York City with his family in 1949. In 1953, he received a Bachelor of Science in Physics from Brooklyn College. He was admitted to Syracuse University for graduate work, and received his doctorate in 1958 for a thesis in theoretical physics.

=== Career ===
He started his career at Raytheon, where he worked on nuclear reactors in Boston. He then worked for Allied Research on space projects. In 1961, he was the founder and President of Space Sciences, Inc., a government contract research firm based in Waltham, Massachusetts. In 1968, the company was acquired by the Whittaker Corporation for US$1.8 million, which made Ziering "well-to-do". He and his family relocated to Los Angeles, California, where he was a research director at Whittaker. In 1970 he left Whittaker and founded a fish meal company, but the business failed.

In 1973, Ziering learned of the work of a chemist, Robert Ban, who had developed radioimmunoassay techniques for detecting very low levels of drugs, hormones, etc. in bodily fluids. Ban had founded a company, Diagnostic Products Corporation, that manufactured and distributed kits. Ziering invested $50,000 into the company, and became its president. Ziering subsequently bought out Ban, and Ziering's wife Marilyn Ziering joined the company as vice-president. The company went public in 1982. In 2000, the company had about 1700 employees and was marketing 400 immunoassay tests along with the associated instrumentation. In 2006, the company was acquired for $1.86 billion by Siemens, becoming the subsidiary Siemens Healthcare Diagnostics.

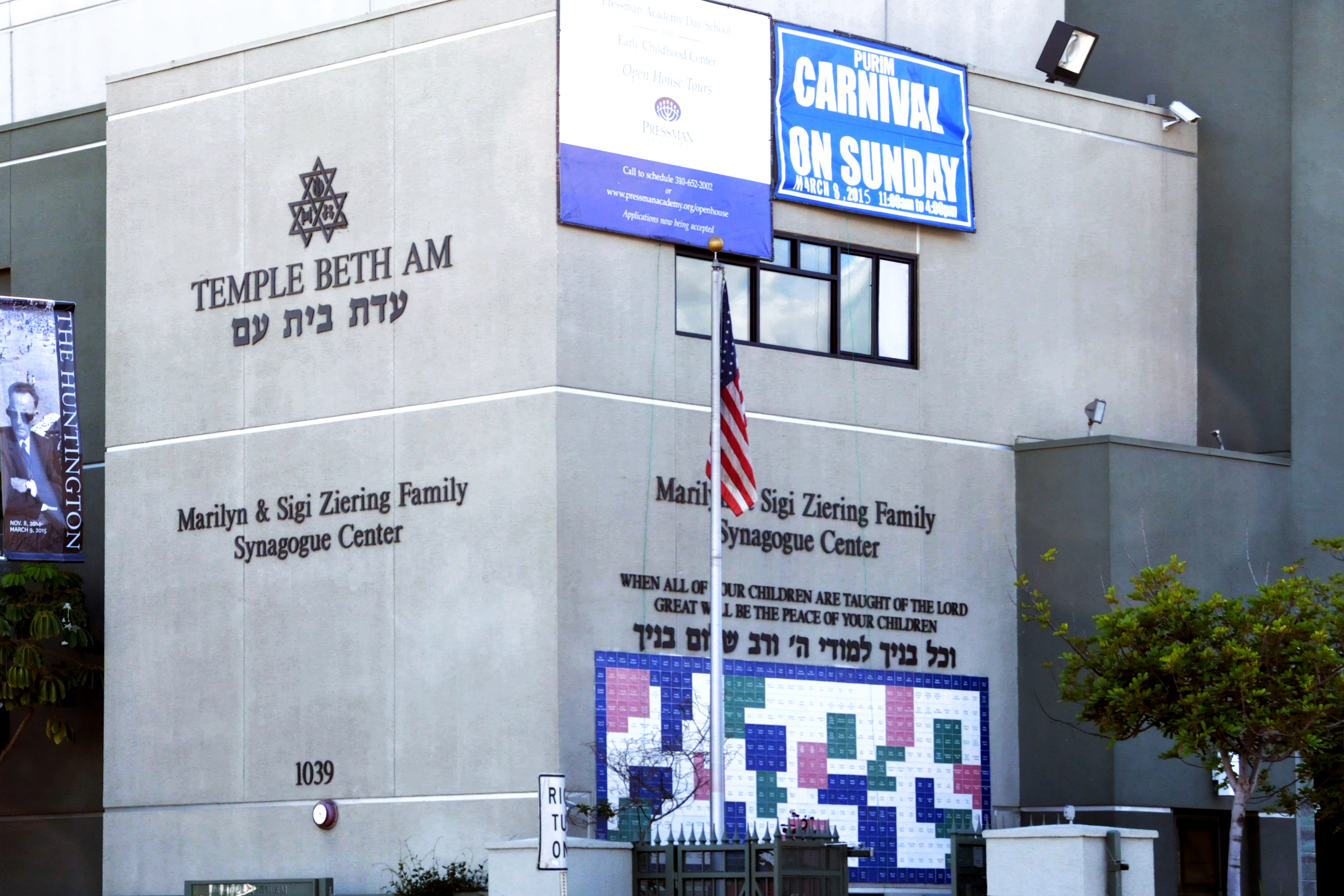
Temple Beth Am, Marilyn & Sigi Ziering Family Synagogue Center.

=== Philanthropy ===
He was a philanthropist to Jewish causes. Indeed, he was President of Temple Beth Am. In 1976, with his wife, he endowed a program at the Sheba Medical Center to screen all children born in Israel for hypothyroidism, thus saving more than 2,000 Israeli children from intellectual disability. He also served on the board of trustees of the American Jewish University in Bel Air and as co-chair of the Los Angeles section of the United States Holocaust Memorial Museum in Washington, D.C.

=== The Judgment of Herbert Bierhoff ===
Ziering wrote a play entitled The Judgment of Herbert Bierhoff that was first performed in September 1999. The play is about the destruction of Jewish families during the Holocaust. It is based on the actions of Herbert Bierhoff, a historical figure and German Jew who poisoned his daughter when he heard that she would be deported by the Nazis. When the Nazis discovered his actions, they executed him. His widow was sent to the concentration camp in Riga, where she died. In the play, as she lies dying she asks her late husband's friend Shimon to ensure judges see that Herbert's action was merciful in light of the circumstances. Survivors David, Kurt and Esther debate whether Herbert did the right thing or not.

The cast of the 1999 production in Los Angeles included Jon Voight and Cloris Leachman. The play was published along with several essays in 2005. In 2008, the play was performed by students at his alma mater, Syracuse University.

=== Personal life ===
He married Marilyn Ziering (née Brisman) in New York City on June 5, 1953. They had met on vacation in the Catskills. They both enrolled for graduate work at Syracuse University, where Marilyn Ziering earned an M.S. in audiology in 1956. After moving to Los Angeles in the late 1960s, they joined Temple Beth Am, a Conservative Jewish congregation in Los Angeles in 1969. The couple had two sons and two daughters:

- Michael Ziering
- Ira Ziering
- Rosanne Ziering
- Amy Ziering. She is married to Gil Kofman and works as a documentary filmmaker.

Sigi Ziering died of brain cancer on November 12, 2000. He was interred at Hillside Memorial Park in Culver City, California.

== Legacy ==
Shortly after his death, his widow established the Sigi Ziering Institute at the American Jewish University in Bel Air; the Institute is dedicated to "Exploring the Ethical and Religious Implications of the Holocaust". From 2001 through 2007, Diagnostic Products Corporation sponsored the "Sigi Ziering Award for Outstanding Contribution for a Publication in the Journal Clinical Chemistry"; honorees were selected by the American Association for Clinical Chemistry.

In 2007, Marilyn Ziering endowed the Sigi and Marilyn Ziering National Center for Newborn Screening at the Sheba Medical Center in Tel HaShomer, Ramat Gan, Tel Aviv, Israel, helping screen Israeli-born children from early signs of intellectual disability. In February 2013, she also established the US$1 million Marilyn and Sigi Ziering Endowment for the Arts at Shalem College in Jerusalem, Israel. Additionally, in 2009 she endowed the Brandeis Collegiate Institute (BCI), which was renamed the Marilyn and Sigi Ziering Brandeis Collegiate Institute.

The United States Holocaust Memorial Museum has preserved a 12-page letter Sigi Ziering wrote to his father from Sweden on June 24, 1945, as well as a testimony given to the USC Shoah Foundation Institute for Visual History and Education on February 28, 1999, both describing his ordeal at the hands of the Nazis. The documents can be read and heard at the museum.
