= Marilyn Ziering =

American business executive and philanthropist

- Education: Syracuse University
- Occupations: Business executive, philanthropist
- Spouse: Sigi Ziering
- Children: Michael Ziering; Ira Ziering; Rosanne Ziering; Amy Ziering
- Relatives: Herman Ziering (brother-in-law); Gil Kofman (son-in-law)

Marilyn Ziering is a retired American business executive and philanthropist in Los Angeles, California. She served as Senior Vice President of the Diagnostic Products Corporation for three decades. A trustee of the Los Angeles Opera, she has endowed programs at Syracuse University, Shalem College and the American Jewish University. She has also supported the American Friends of the Israeli Philharmonic, the Sheba Medical Center and Shalem College in Israel.

== Early life and business career ==
Marilyn Ziering is the daughter of Harry and Eva Brisman and was born in New York around 1932. She married Sigi Ziering in 1953. She and her husband did graduate work at Syracuse University, where she earned a master's degree in audiology in 1956. She was the Senior Vice President of the Diagnostic Products Corporation, a medical supplies company founded in 1973 by her late husband, for three decades.

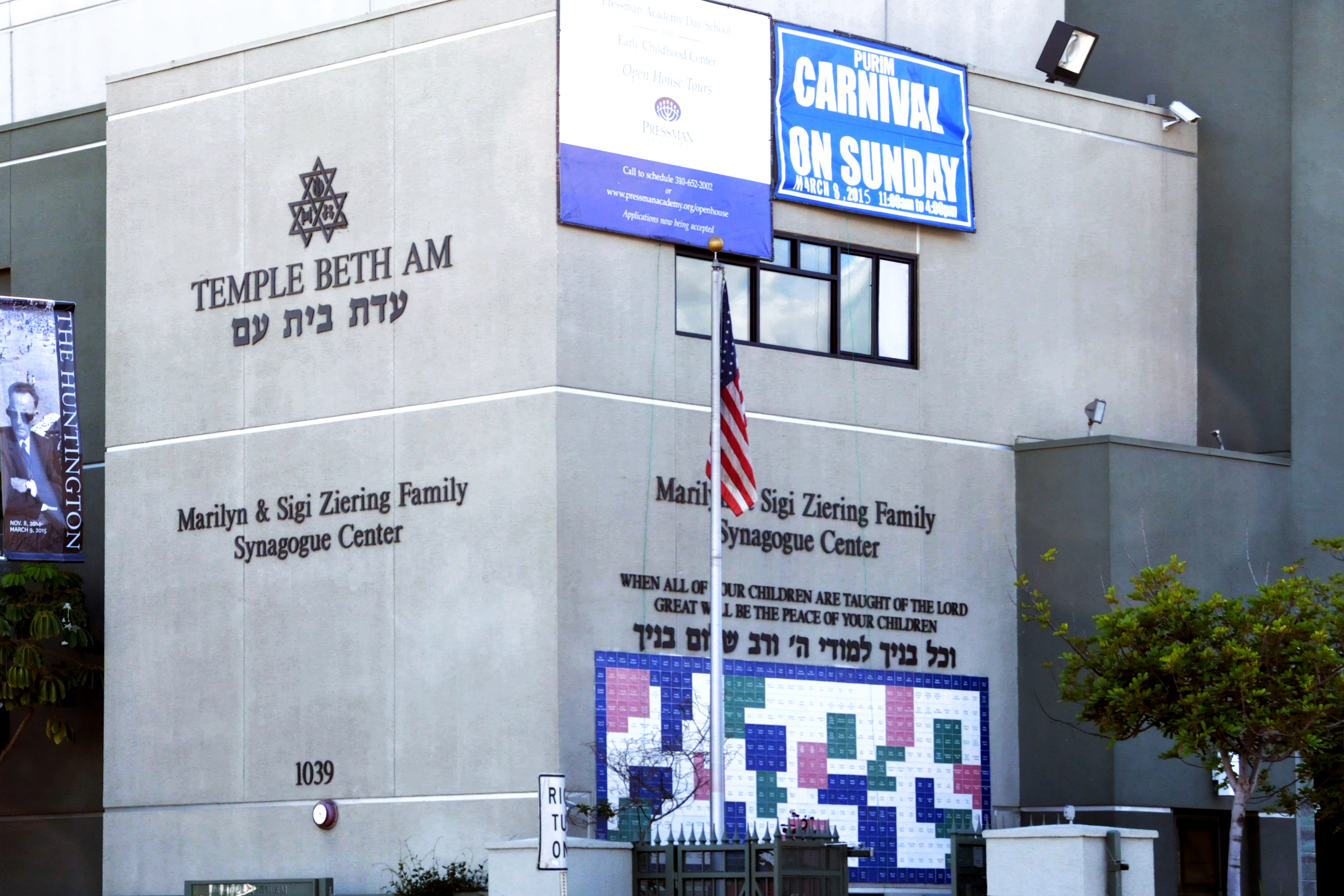
Temple Beth Am, Marilyn & Sigi Ziering Family Synagogue Center.

== Philanthropy ==
She is a co-founder of the United States Holocaust Memorial Museum. She was also the founding president of the Women's Group at the Friends of Sheba Medical Center, a hospital based in Tel HaShomer, Ramat Gan, Tel Aviv, Israel, from which she is the recipient of the Woman of Achievement Award. She has endowed the Sigi and Marilyn Ziering National Center for Newborn Screening at the Sheba Medical Center. Additionally, she has served on the Board of Directors of Temple Beth Am in Los Angeles, where she is a Hall of Honor inductee and recipient of the Torah Fund Award. She served on the board of trustees of the Venice Family Clinic. Moreover, she serves as one of four co-vice presidents on the board of directors of the American Friends of the Israeli Philharmonic. She also serves on the Honorary Board of the World Alliance for Israel Political Action Committee (WAIPAC).

She served as the chairman of the board of trustees of the American Jewish University (AJU) in Bel Air. Shortly after her husband's death, she established the Sigi Ziering Institute Exploring the Ethical and Religious Implications of the Holocaust at AJU. In 2008, she sponsored the "Symposium on Holocaust Education: A Tribute to the Voices Lost" at Syracuse University, her alma mater, co-organized by the United States Holocaust Memorial Museum, the Syracuse University School of Education and the Spector/Warren Fellowship for Future Educators. In 2011, she sponsored the Alternative Spring Break to Montevideo, Uruguay, of students associated with Hillel: The Foundation for Jewish Campus Life at the University of California, Los Angeles (UCLA). She has also donated to the Dortort Center for Creativity in the Arts at UCLA Hillel.

In February 2013, she established the US$1 million Marilyn and Sigi Ziering Endowment for the Arts at Shalem College in Jerusalem, Israel. The endowment led to the hiring of Roy Oppenheim as Professor of Music and Music Theory. She also established the Sigi Ziering Fund for Philosophy and Ethics at Shalem College. The fund endows the research of Asa Kasher, a co-author of the Israel Defense Forces's Code of Ethics, and Ruth Gavison, a human rights legal scholar. She has also donated to Camp Ramah, a summer camp.

She serves as one of five vice chairmen on the board of trustees of the Los Angeles Opera, where she has been a major donor. In 2006, she made a US$3.25 million charitable contribution to the L.A. Opera for the performance of works by artists assassinated by the Nazi regime during the Holocaust. The program, known as 'Recovered Voices,' was first suggested by conductor James Conlon. However, it was discontinued in 2010 due to financial constraints. In 2013, she revived the program at the Colburn School in Downtown Los Angeles, by donating US$1 million. It came to be known as the Ziering-Conlon Initiative for Recovered Voices.

In 2014, she was a Gold Sponsor of the Los Angeles Jewish Film Festival.

== Personal life ==
She married Sigi Ziering in 1953. They joined Temple Beth Am, a Conservative Jewish congregation in Los Angeles in 1969. The couple had two sons and two daughters: Michael Ziering, Ira Ziering, Rosanne Ziering, Amy Ziering. Their daughter Amy is married to Gil Kofman and works as a documentary filmmaker.
