= George Konheim =

American real-estate developer

- Born: 1917; Akron, Ohio, U.S.
- Died: 2001 (age 84); Los Angeles, California, U.S.
- Occupation(s): Real estate developer, philanthropist
- Spouse: Eva Konheim
- Children: Neil Konheim; Bruce Konheim; Lyn Konheim; Terri Cooper Konheim

George Konheim (1917–2001) was an American real estate developer and philanthropist.

== Early life ==
George Konheim was born to a Jewish family in Akron, Ohio in 1917. He had a brother and two sisters. At the age of eight, he began selling newspapers in the morning and bagels in the evening. He dropped out of high school and worked as a vegetable pushcart. However, he studied engineering at night school and eventually worked for Pratt & Whitney during the Second World War.

== Career ==
In Ohio, Konheim ran a gas station chain called George's Super Service Gas Stations and an auto-painting franchise called Deb.

In 1947, Konheim founded Buckeye Construction Co., a real estate development company headquartered in Beverly Hills, California. Initially, they built private residences in Beverlywood and Cheviot Hills, two neighborhoods of Los Angeles around the Hillcrest Country Club. Three years later, in 1950, he partnered with Bram Goldsmith and focused on commercial buildings. Some of their best-known buildings are the City National Bank building in Downtown Los Angeles, the Bank of America Building in Beverly Hills and the Academy of Motion Picture Arts and Sciences headquarters on Wilshire Boulevard.

== Philanthropy ==
Konheim donated to the Boy Scouts of America, the Child Welfare League of America, the City of Hope National Medical Center, the Jewish Federation of Los Angeles and the Los Angeles County Museum of Art (LACMA). He was a co-founder of the Los Angeles Music Center.

Konheim established the Vista Del Mar Child and Family Services in Cheviott Hills, a recovery center for abused children and adolescents. He also created the Neil Konheim Know Your Body Program, taught in school districts throughout California.

Konheim helped found the Temple Beth Am on La Cienega Boulevard in Los Angeles. He also encouraged Hank Greenberg and Sandy Koufax to publicly support the Maccabiah Games, and he funded the all Southern California athletes for Games in 1961 and 1965. He was inducted into the Southern California Jewish Sports Hall of Fame.

== Family and death ==
Konheim was married to Eva Konheim. They resided in Beverly Hills, California. Their son Neil died in a jetliner crash in China in 1982. They had two additional sons, Bruce and Lyn, and a daughter, Terri Cooper.

Konheim died in 2001. Services were held at Temple Beth Am in Los Angeles.
